= Sufism =

Mystic practices in Islam

Sufism (Arabic: التصوف, romanised: al-tasawwuf) is a diverse Islamic spiritual and ethical discipline concerned with spiritual excellence (ihsan), purification of the self and heart (tazkiya), sainthood and closeness to God (wilaya), and remembrance of God (dhikr).

While commonly described as "Islamic mysticism", this designation captures only one dimension of the broader discipline. Nile Green notes the "narrowing and prescriptive tendencies" of the model of "mysticism", arguing that it can "castigate or exclude much of what it was meant to explain." He therefore proposes understanding Sufism as "primarily a tradition of powerful knowledge, practices and persons," rather than reducing it to the "mysticism of a marginal party of God-seekers." (Note: William C. Chittick describes Sufism as "the interiorisation and intensification of Islamic faith and practice", anchoring it to ihsan, the third dimension of religion in the Hadith of Jibril, alongside islam and iman. Annemarie Schimmel defines Sufism as "an interiorization of Islam" and "a personal experience of the central mystery of Islam", namely tawhid, the Oneness of God.)

Sufis also played an important role in the spread of Islam through their missionary and educational activities. Although the overwhelming majority of Sufis, both pre-modern and modern, remain adherents of Sunni Islam, some strands of Sufi thought transferred over to the ambits of Shia Islam during the late Middle Ages after the Safavid conversion of Iran under the concept of irfan.

Although Sufis were opposed to dry legalism, with the exception of certain antinomian groups—such as the Bektashis, Malamis, and Qalandaris—mainstream Sufis strictly observed Islamic law and belonged to various schools of Islamic jurisprudence and theology. Despite a relative decline of Sufi orders in the modern era including attacks and accusations from fundamentalist Islamic movements (such as Salafi-Wahhabist groups) who view the Sufis as those who have deviated from the deen, Sufism has continued to play an important role in the Islamic world. The extent of this decline varied from country to country, but by the 1950s Sufism had experienced "a dramatic loss of appeal" among Muslims. However, Sufism not only survived but in recent decades has undergone a revival and revitalisation, to the point that Knysh suggests it could lead to a "full-blown Sufi revival". At the same time, what is called Neo-Sufism has emerged, seeking to suck Islam out of Sufism, or at the very least heavily minimise it, or reinterpret it as one of the great traditions of humanity pointing towards the same universal truth, a kind of perennialism.

It has also influenced various forms of spirituality in the West and generated significant academic interest.

== Religious and cultural interactions ==
As Mannopov, Rajavaliev, and Juraev argue, Tasawwuf is not a deviation from orthodoxy, but a structured path to moral and spiritual excellence, integrating law with love, action with insight, and outward form with inner transformation.

Ibn Khaldun situated Sufism within the Islamic religious sciences:

Sufism belongs to the sciences of the religious law that originated in Islam. It is based on the assumption that the practice of its adherents had always been considered by the important early Muslims, the men around Muhammad and the men of the second generation, as well as those who came after them, as the path of truth and right guidance. The Sufi approach is based upon constant application to divine worship, complete devotion to God, aversion to false splendour of the world, abstinence from the pleasure, property, and position to which the great mass aspire, and retirement from the world into solitude for divine worship. These things were general among the men around Muhammad and the early Muslims. Then worldly aspirations increased in the second [eighth] century and after. At that time, the special name of Sufis was given to those who aspired to divine worship.

The vast breadth of this tradition is reflected in the difficulty of reducing it to a single definition. Sidi Ahmad Zarruq, a Moroccan Sufi master and jurist, stated that there are nearly two thousand definitions of tasawwuf, yet these diverse formulations ultimately distil into a single core essence.

From its earliest literature, Sufi masters have emphasised that the spiritual reality of tasawwuf predated its name, affirming that the name is meaningless without the reality it signifies.

Ali ibn Ahmad al-Bushanji (d. 348 AH) laments:

"Sufism is a name without a reality, but it used to be a reality without a name."

Al-Hujwiri (d. c. 465 AH):

"In the time of the Companions of the Prophet and their immediate successors this name did not exist, but its reality was in everyone. Now the name exists without the reality."

Sufism, unlike what is often called Christian mysticism, was the "spiritual and intellectual glue" that held together the culturally and ethnically diverse societies of the Islamic world. It retained its pervasive, default mainstream status until the late nineteenth and early twentieth centuries, when it faced a combined onslaught from Western modernists, secular nationalists, and fundamentalist reformers. Agrarian reforms, new systems of taxation, and the secularisation of education under Westernised governments also severely undermined Sufism.

As John Renard emphasises:

"The history of Sufism is not the story of some aberrant sect or cult... It is integral to the history of the global faith community of Islam."

The development of Sufism took place within the wider religious and intellectual environment of the late-antique world. As Islam expanded, Muslims came into contact with diverse religious traditions and intellectual currents.

They came into contact with Jews and Christians, including Nestorian and Miaphysite communities, in Mesopotamia, the mountains of Lebanon, and the wider Near and Middle East. According to Schimmel, Christians are often mentioned in Sufi stories. In fact, contact with Christians was not just possible; it was unavoidable. However, the claim that Muslims imitated the monastic practices of these Christians has not met with uniform acceptance among scholars. They also came into contact with Buddhists in eastern Iran and Transoxiana, and with Manichaeism in the Near and Middle East and Central Asia.

Zoroastrian influences on the wider Islamic world must certainly be taken into account from the beginning of the Abbasid period. Additionally, many prominent scholars have identified Neoplatonic influences in the development of Sufism. Reynold A. Nicholson nevertheless regarded early Sufism as "a native product of Islam itself", while Schimmel notes that Sufism "grew out of a soil in which ancient oriental, Neoplatonic, and Christian influences were strong", and that "a number of secondary influences may have worked upon Islam even in its earliest phase".

Many scholars have held, and some still do, that there is Indian influence on the formative period of Sufism, but Schimmel notes that they "could not bring any stringent proof of such influences", while adding that the evidence is different when considering later periods.

This does not require choosing between the simplistic alternatives that Sufism was either a completely isolated "native product" or a foreign import. Knysh argues that debates over Islamic and non-Islamic origins have often been shaped by apologetic and polemical concerns. Knysh draws an important comparison: Christianity's dependence on Judaism for its scriptures and forms of worship does not make it non-Christian, just as the adoption of certain Manichaean ideas by early Mesopotamian and Syrian monks did not make them Manichaeans or render them less authentically Christian. And similarly, from a secular point of view, Islam itself inhabits the same symbolic world of Christianity without ceasing to be Islam. Likewise, if Sufism incorporated non-Islamic influences, this would not make this "ascetic-mystical" tendency, to use Knysh's term, non-Islamic.

Knysh further argues that, if we admit that a religion seeks to be attractive in order to recruit more followers, then, to be competitive, Islam might have creatively adopted the ascetic-mystical beliefs it came into contact with. But if that is the case, then the question remains: why did this not cease after the earliest period, but instead remain so successful and persistent, and mainstream, until the twentieth century? Hodgson's "temperament thesis" falls short of explaining this and, according to empirical studies, "natural-born" mystics are but a minority, not just in our time but in the premodern world too.

== Language and terminology ==
Woolen clothes were traditionally associated with ascetics and mystics. The original meaning of ṣūfī seems to have been "one who wears wool (ṣūf)" symbolising asceticism and detachment from worldly life, and the Encyclopaedia of Islam calls other etymological hypotheses "untenable". Al-Qushayri and Ibn Khaldun both rejected all possibilities other than ṣūf (wool) on linguistic and documented grounds. Later, mediaeval scholars like Al-Biruni believed that the term 'Sufi' gradually evolved from the Greek term σοφός (sophos), which means wisdom or knowledge with an assessment also forms the basis for the views of certain orientalists regarding the origins of Sufism. (Note: Orientalists proposed a variety of origin theories regarding Sufism, such as that it originated as an Indo-European response to Semitic influence, Buddhism, Neo-Platonism, and Christian ascetism or Gnosticism. Modern academics and scholars however, have rejected early Orientalist theories asserting a non-Islamic origin of Sufism,)

Some sources, however, consider the word to be of Arabic origin and offer related Islamic- explanations; these explanations traces the lexical root of the word to ṣafā (صفاء), which in Arabic means "purity", and in this context another similar idea of tasawwuf (lit. 'to make oneself a Sufi') as considered in Islam is tazkiyah (تزكية, 'self-purification'), which is also widely used in Sufism. (Note: Sufi Al-Hasan ibn Salih al-Rudhabari (d. 322 AH), said, "The Sufi is the one who wears wool on top of purity.") Others have suggested that the word comes from the term Ahl al-Ṣuffa ("the people of the suffah" or "the bench"), who were in tradition a group of impoverished companions of Muhammad who held regular gatherings of dhikr sat at the Prophet's Mosque considered by some to be the first Sufis. Classical Sufi texts, which stressed certain teachings and practices of the Quran and the sunnah gave definitions of tasawwuf based on ethical and spiritual goals and qualities (Note: The following are among definitions of Sufism quoted in an early Sufi treatise by Abu Nasr as-Sarraj • "Sufism is that you should be with God—without any attachment." (Junayd of Baghdad) • "Sufism consists of abandoning oneself to God in accordance with what God wills." (Ruwaym ibn Ahmad) • "Sufism is that you should not possess anything nor should anything possess you." (Samnun) • "Sufism consists of entering every exalted quality (khulq) and leaving behind every despicable quality." (Abu Muhammad al-Jariri) • "Sufism is that at each moment the servant should be in accord with what is most appropriate (awla) at that moment." ('Amr ibn 'Uthman al-Makki)) as a teaching tool for their attainment. In modern scholarly usage, the term serves to describe a wide range of social, cultural, political, and religious phenomena associated with Sufis.

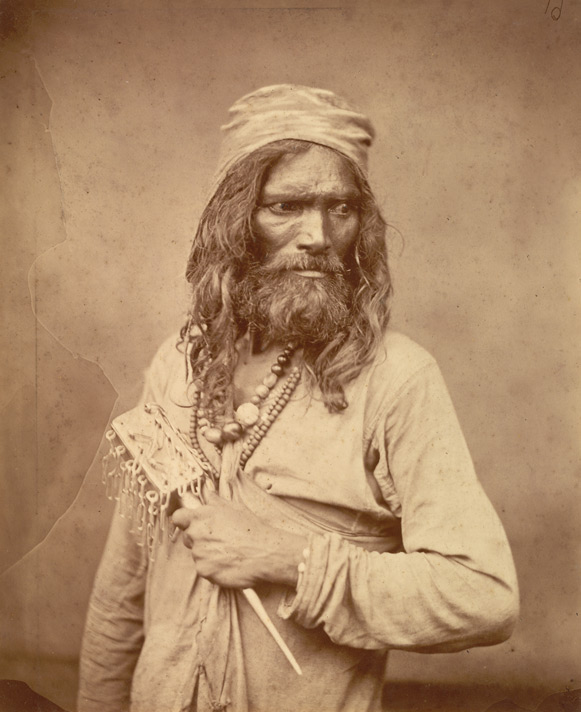
A Sufi Muslim ascetic (fakir) in Bengal during the 1860s

Some teachers, especially when addressing more general audiences or mixed groups of Muslims and non-Muslims, make extensive use of parable, allegory, and metaphor. The term Sufism was originally introduced into European languages in the 18th century by Orientalist scholars, who viewed it mainly as an intellectual doctrine and literary tradition at variance with what they saw as the sterile monotheism of Islam. It was often taken as a universal mysticism in contrast to legalistic orthodox Islam. In recent times, the historian Nile Green has argued against such distinctions, stating that in the mediaeval period Sufism and Islam were more or less the same. Although approaches to teaching vary among different Sufi orders, Sufism as a whole is primarily concerned with direct personal experience, and as such has sometimes been compared to other, non-Islamic forms of mysticism (e.g., as in the books of Seyyed Hossein Nasr). Some modern scholars have used other definitions of Sufism, such as the "intensification of Islamic faith and practice" and the "process of realizing ethical and spiritual ideals".

== Journey to the truth / Teachings and doctrines ==
Zuhd, tawakkul and taqwa; according to some traditions the Islamic prophet Muhammad and his immediate followers practiced asceticism. However, contemporary mainstream Islam has not had a tradition of asceticism, but its Sufi groups have cherished their own ascetic tradition for several centuries. Tawakkul (reliance on God), a concept widespread among Muslims, can also be viewed as a necessary consequence of the asceticism (zuhd) embraced in Sufism; meanwhile, taqwa —sometimes presented as God-consciousness— contains an allusion to the God-fearers sect of ancient Judaism.

"Devotion and dedication"; many Sufis believe that reaching the highest levels of success in Sufism typically requires that the disciple (Murid) live with and serve the teacher (Murshid) for a long time. Although spiritual guides generally do not seek to establish authority over their disciples beyond the scope of spiritual guidance, certain guides making bold claims may occasionally go further, adopting titles such as ghawth, qutb, or qutb al-aqtab —titles that imply universal divine efficacy and cosmic governance that classical understandings of jurisprudence and theology define as shirk— or, as historical examples demonstrate, they may even claim to possess the attributes of the Mahdi, thereby asserting political leadership alongside their spiritual powers. An illustrative example of this is the popular narrative concerning Baha-ud-Din Naqshband Bukhari, who gave his name to the Naqshbandi Order. It is recounted that, in addition to serving his first spiritual master, Mohammad Baba As-Samasi, for the twenty years leading up to the latter's death, he also served other masters for extended periods. These accounts further note that he dedicated many years to assisting the disadvantaged members of society. Following these efforts, his master advised him to attend to the care of animals such as by cleaning their wounds and ministering to their needs. In another instance, a candidate wishing to join the Mevlevi Order was required to serve in the kitchen of a soup kitchen for the poor for 1,001 days before being accepted for spiritual training; completing the training required an additional 1,001 days of solitary seclusion.

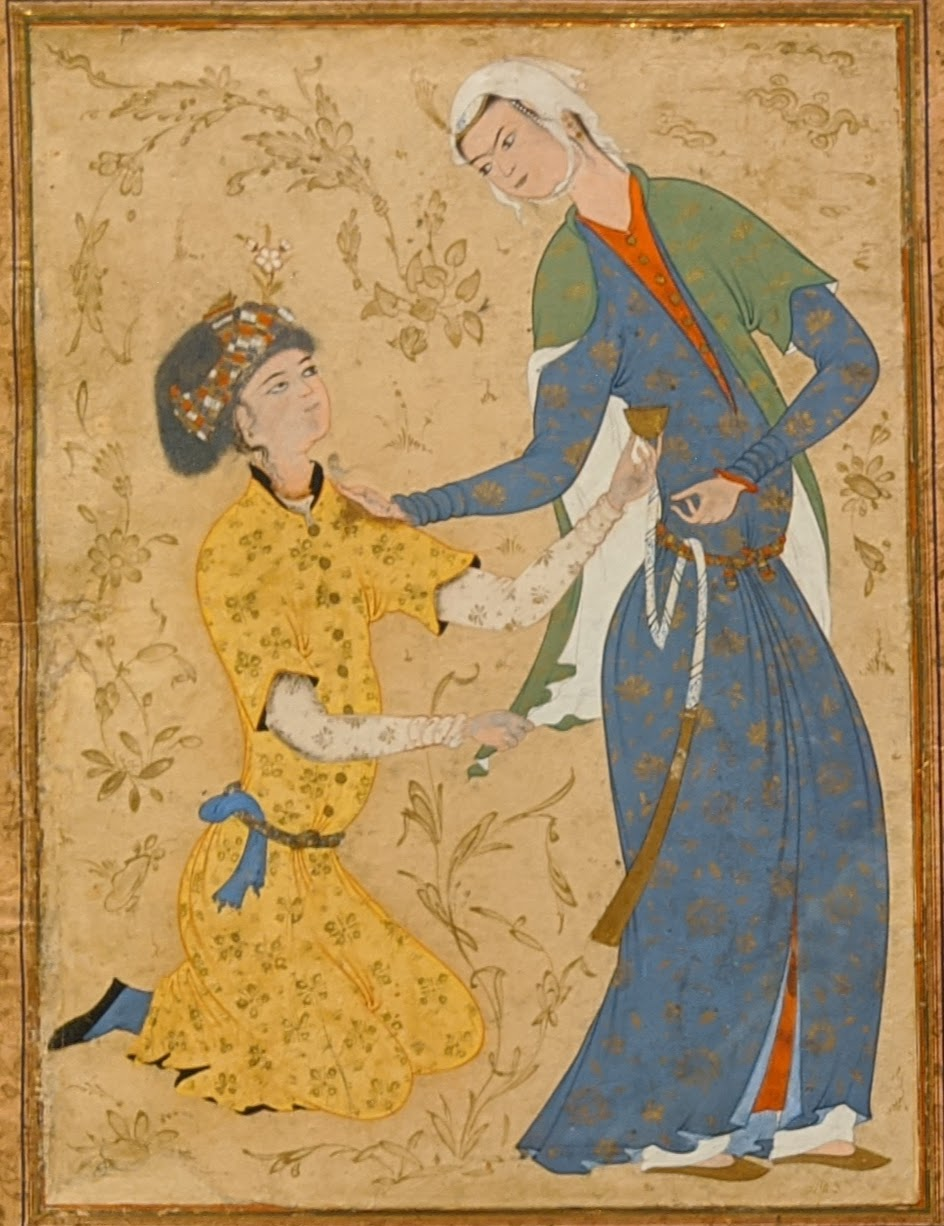
Man holding the hem of his beloved, an expression of a Sufi's agony of longing for the divine union

One of the most important doctrines of Sufism is the concept of al-Insān al-Kāmil (the Perfect Human), which posits that a qutb (the pole or axis of the universe) always exists on earth; this individual is —according to the belief— a perfect conduit for the divine grace flowing from God to humanity and exists in a state of walayah ("sainthood" or "being under God's guardianship") akin to the Imamate in Shi'ism. This belief puts Sufism in conflict with Shia Islam also, since both the qutb —who, in most Sufi orders, is the head of the order— and the imam fulfil the role of "the purveyor of spiritual guidance and of Allah's grace to mankind" and both of them will demand absolute obedience from their followers.

At its heart is an ardent love of God (mahabba, ishq) and that which reflects Him. Central to its spiritual life and tradition is the role of saints, or friends of God (awliya), and the spiritual master. They are understood to embody and transmit this path across generations. and to teach it as masters associated with the Qur'anic Al-Khidr.

The wayfarer (salik) is traditionally described as progressing through various stations (maqamat) and states (ahwal) along a path of spiritual intimacy with God. This spiritual striving along the path towards God is known as suluk.

The two most important states on the path are fana' and baqa', describing spiritual transformation in terms of the effacement of the ego and subsistence through God, while distinguishing these concepts from hulul, the heretical doctrine of divine indwelling. The culmination of this path is associated with ma'rifa, or direct experiential knowledge of God, and dhawq, the mystical "taste" of spiritual reality.

Traditionally, Muslims believe that Islam is the route to God and aim to become closer to God in Paradise—both after death and following the Last Judgement. Sufis also hold that it is possible to draw nearer to God and more fully experience the divine presence in this life. In Sufism, it is taught that the Truth is attained through a four-dimensional transformation of consciousness. Without passing through the stages of Sharia (exoteric form), Tariqa (esoteric path), and Ma'rifa (experiential gnosis), the seeker (Salik) cannot reach the Absolute Reality —symbolized by Fana-fillah and Baqa-billah— where all dualities dissolve. For those who attain this state, there is neither sorrow nor anxiety in this world or the Hereafter; Paradise ceases to be a reward, and Hell ceases to be a torment. In orthodox Sufi doctrine, Sharia is viewed as an enduring foundation; however, in more radical and esoteric traditions, Sharia consists merely of an external shell —a preliminary structure or lower stage- to be transcended once the inner truth is revealed.

=== Theological perspectives; God and attaining to Him ===
In Sufi thought, the conception of God and the methods unique to Sufis for attaining Him diverge significantly from mainstream Islamic theology (kalām). While kalām focuses on proving —through rational arguments— the existence of a Creator who is ontologically distinct from creation, abstract, and transcendent (al-Muta‘āl), Sufism views Him as Absolute Being (al-Wujūd al-Mutlaq) or Absolute Truth (al-Haqq) and regards other beings as reflections or manifestations of that Absolute Being (tajalli / theophany); it seeks to understand God —and to achieve closeness and union with Him— through these reflections and the visible splendour and beauty they embody. Although this fundamental conception raises certain theological and jurisprudential issues in classical Islamic thought, (Note: According to the Wahdat al-wujūd interpretetion, the universe was a manifestation of God's -the absolute being- names, and was manifestations or notions with no real existence. Haydar Amuli refused to make any distinction on this matter, arguing that evil beings like Satan were also manifestations of God's imperial names.) it offers a human solution to the problem of human solitude and the difficulty of grasping the Absolute-one; it promises the fulfilment —during one's lifetime— of the yearning to reach God and attain absolute peace, a desire traditionally associated with the afterlife; it transforms God from a mere "First Cause" and "Judge" into a lovable Being with whom intimacy and companionship can be established everywhere, and this resonates within society.

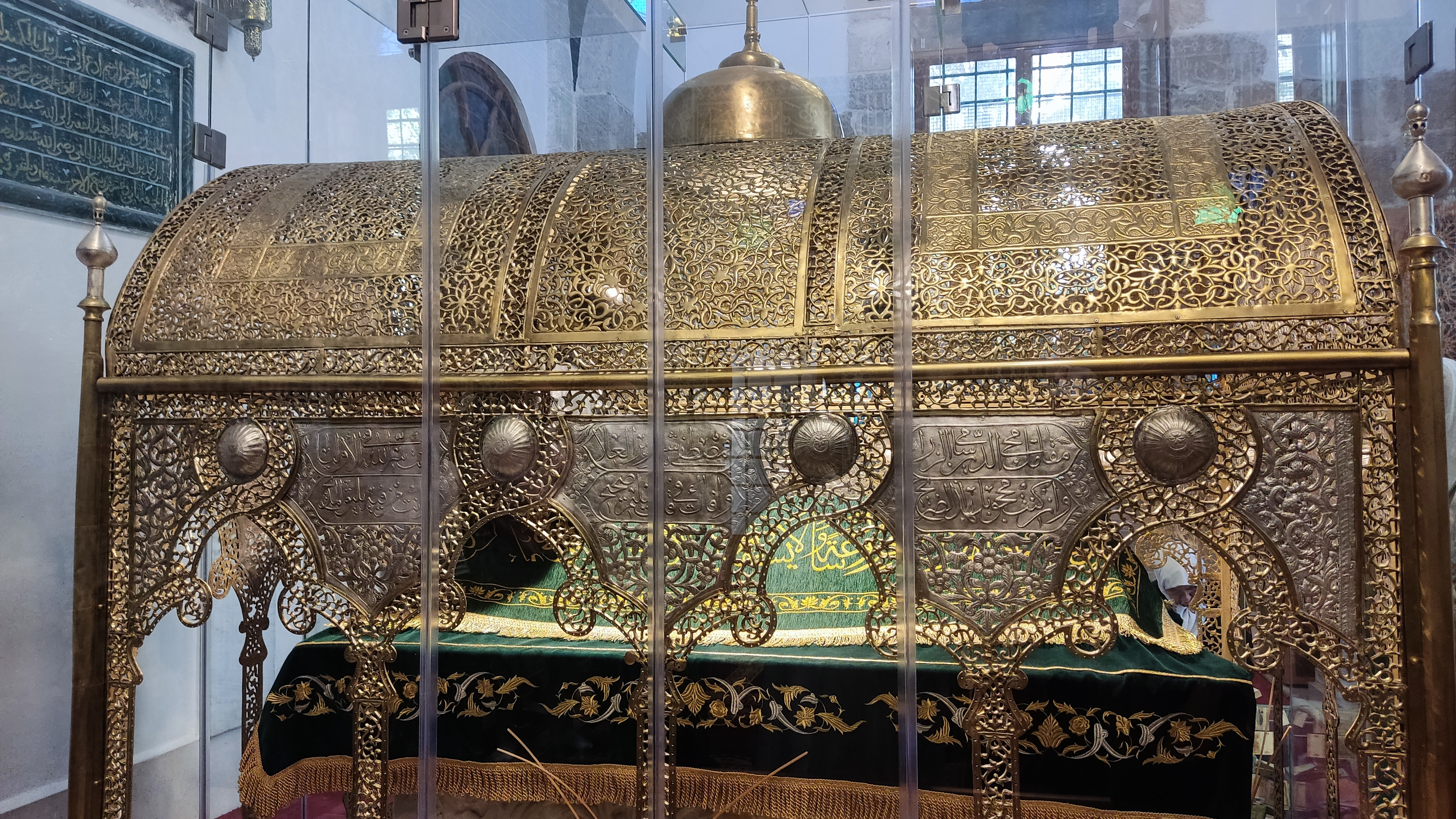
The tomb of Shaykh al-Akbar (Greatest Master) Muhyiddin Ibn 'Arabi in Damascus.

Traditional Islamic scholars have recognised two major branches within the practice of Sufism and use this as one key to differentiating among the approaches of different masters and devotional lineages.

On the one hand there is the order from the signs to the Signed (or from the arts to the Artisan). In this branch, the seeker begins by purifying the lower self of every corrupting influence that stands in the way of recognising all of creation as the work of God, as God's active self-disclosure or theophany. This is the way of Imam Al-Ghazali and of the majority of the Sufi orders.

On the other hand, there is the order from the Signed to signs, or from the Artisan to arts. In this branch the seeker experiences divine attraction (Ishq and "jadhba"), and is able to enter the order with a glimpse of its endpoint, of direct apprehension of the Divine Presence towards which all spiritual striving is directed. It is claimed that this method provides direct access to God, without requiring the prolonged effort associated with other Sufi orders. This is the way primarily of the masters of the Naqshbandi and Shadhili orders.

According to traditional jurists fiqh, also favored by Said Nursî— strict adherence to the path of Muhammad (sunnah) offers a sufficient, holistic, and spirituality-oriented understanding of servitude that does not require a Sufi master.

=== Perspective on the human being ===
==== Inner Senses (Lata'if)s ====
Sufism frequently employs terms such as "subtle centers" or "subtle centers of cognition" (known as Lataif-e-sitta) —concepts analogous to chakras or the spiritual body— and these centers serve as the loci for the awakening of spiritual intuition. In general, these subtle centres or latâ'if are thought of as faculties that are to be purified sequentially in order to bring the seeker's wayfaring to completion. Ja'far al-Sadiq (both an imam in the Shia tradition and a respected scholar and link in chains of Sufi transmission in all Islamic sects) held that human beings are dominated by a lower self called the nafs (self, ego, person), a faculty of spiritual intuition called the qalb (heart), and ruh (soul). These interact in various ways, producing the spiritual types of the tyrant (dominated by nafs), the person of faith and moderation (dominated by the spiritual heart), and the person lost in love for God (dominated by the ruh). Just as interpretations of the Laṭāʾif vary, their activation also consists of various methods, singly or in combination, such as:

- Tawajjuh ("attention"): intentional transmission of the Laṭīfa directly from teacher to student.
- Dhikr ("remembrance"): recitation of a Quranic phrase accompanied by postures, breathing, and movement
- Muraqabah ("watching"): persistent awareness directed to the part of the body associated with the Laṭīfa

Sufi psychology is an approach that does not rest on a scientific foundation based on experiment and observation, but rather attempts to explain Sufi concepts —presented under the heading of Letaif— using modern psychological terminology by adding 'Aql (intellect).

==== Muhammad ====
Devotion to Muhammad is of primary importance in Sufism. However it can be said that, proponents of Sufism —in addition to the historical figure of Muhammad and the identity defined in traditional jurisprudence and theology as the Prophet of Islam— added a dimension to him that is entirely unique to their tradition: a "cosmic superhuman being" "situated between the Creator and the created" of a mythological nature, positioned immediately after God. They express this concept —rooted in the belief that God holds him in profound love (Ishq)— through terms such as al-Ḥaqīqah al-Muḥammadiyyah (the Muhammadan Reality) and al-Nūr al-Muḥammadī (the Muhammadan Light), believing that this entity existed prior to the creation of the universe and humanity and will continue to exist thereafter. While the bulk of Sufi literary and poetic tradition centers on venerating this transcendent, cosmic archetype —a feature particularly accentuated in the Irfani (gnostic), Batini, and Malami traditions— expressions underscoring his historical function as a Sharia-bound exemplar and practical leader remain a crucial element, functioning either as an indispensable prerequisite for metaphysical realization or as the primary focus within more legalist Sufi lineages.

His [Muhammad's] aspiration preceded all other aspirations, his existence preceded nothingness, and his name preceded the Pen, because he existed before all peoples. There is not in the horizons, beyond the horizons or below the horizons, anyone more elegant, more noble, more knowing, more just, more fearsome, or more compassionate, than the subject of this tale. He is the leader of created beings, the one "whose name is glorious Ahmad". —Mansur Al-Hallaj

The name of Muhammad in Islamic calligraphy. Sufis believe the name of Muhammad is holy and sacred.

Ibn Arabi regards Muhammad as the greatest man and states, "Muhammad's wisdom is uniqueness (fardiya) because he is the most perfect existent creature of this human species. For this reason, the command began with him and was sealed with him. He was a Prophet while Adam was between water and clay, and his elemental structure is the Seal of the Prophets." Attar of Nishapur claimed that he praised Muhammad in such a manner that was not done before by any poet, in his book the Ilahi-nama, states, "Muhammad is the exemplar to both worlds, the guide of the descendants of Adam. He is the sun of creation, the moon of the celestial spheres, the all-seeing eye...The seven heavens and the eight gardens of paradise were created for him; he is both the eye and the light in the light of our eyes." According to Ibn Arabi, Islam is considered the best religion because of Muhammad. He believed that the first being created was the reality or essence of Muhammad (al-ḥaqīqa al-Muhammadiyya). Ibn Arabi saw Muhammad as the highest human and the master of all creatures, serving as the primary role model for people to emulate. He also held that God's attributes and names are displayed in this world, with Muhammad embodying their most complete and perfect form. To Ibn Arabi, one can see God through Muhammad, implying that divine attributes are manifested in him. He argued that Muhammad is the clearest proof of God's existence, and knowing him is equivalent to knowing God. Additionally, Ibn Arabi argued that Muhammad is the master of all humanity in this life and the hereafter, making Islam the best religion because Muhammad embodies Islam.

In the 13th century, a Sufi poet from Egypt named Al-Busiri the al-Kawākib ad-Durrīya fī Madḥ Khayr al-Barīya (The Celestial Lights in Praise of the Best of Creation), more commonly referred to as Qaṣīdat Al-Burda (Poem of the Mantle), in which he extensively praised Muhammad. This poem is still widely recited and sung amongst Sufi groups and lay Muslims alike all over the world.

Sufis have historically revered Muhammad as the prime personality of spiritual greatness. Sufis have historically stressed the importance of Muhammad's perfection and his ability to intercede. The persona of Muhammad has historically been and remains an integral and critical aspect of Sufi belief and practice. Rumi attributes his self-control and abstinence from worldly desires as qualities attained by him through the guidance of Muhammad. Rumi writes, "I 'sewed' my two eyes shut from [desires for] this world and the next – this I learned from Muhammad." Bayazid Bastami is recorded to have been so devoted to the sunnah of Muhammad that he refused to eat a watermelon because he could not establish that Muhammad ever ate one. The Sufi poet Saadi Shirazi stated, "He who chooses a path contrary to that of the prophet shall never reach the destination. O Saadi, do not think that one can treat that way of purity except in the wake of the chosen one."

==== Sainthood ====
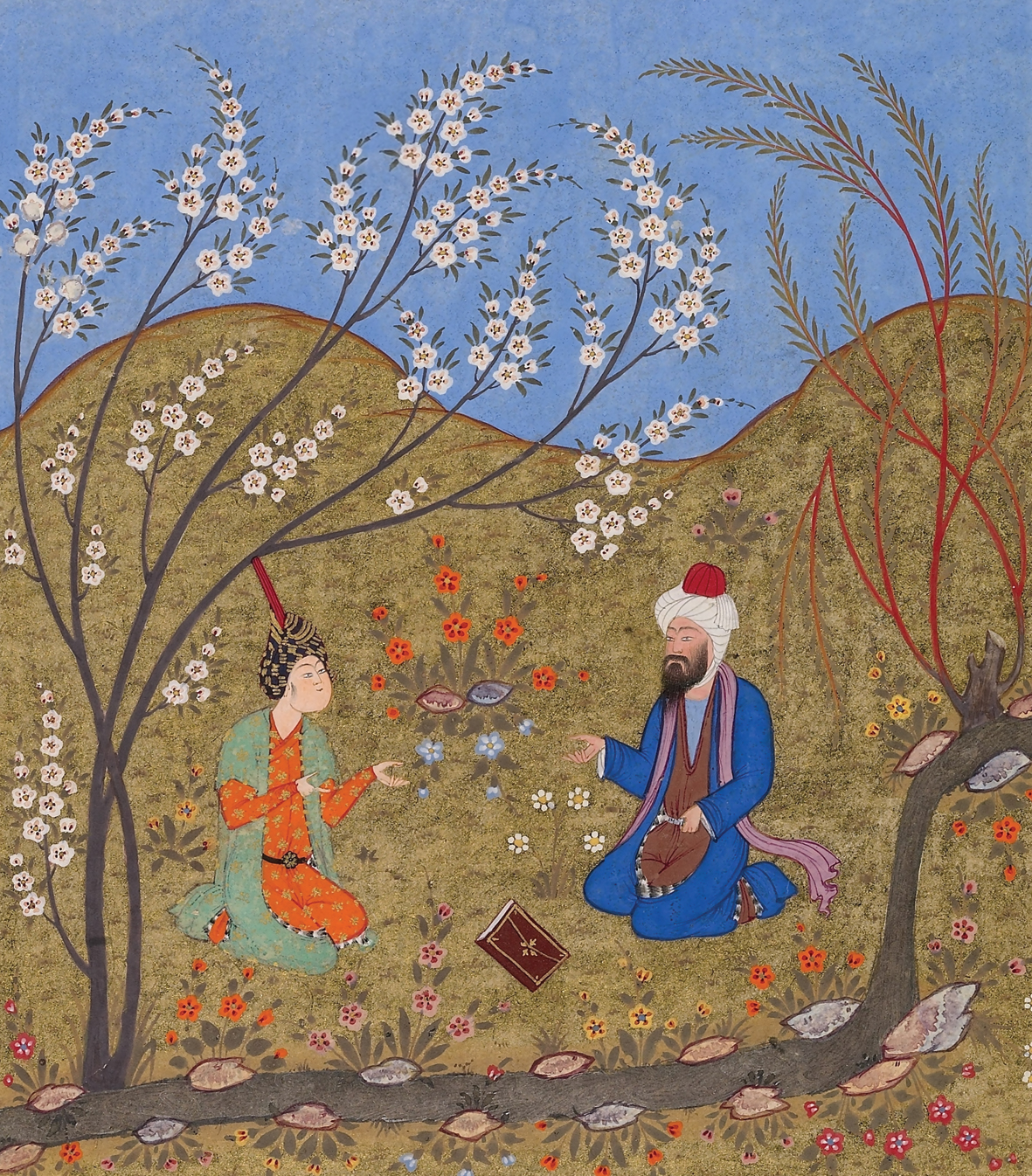
A Persian miniature depicting the mediaeval saint and mystic Ahmad Ghazali (d. 1123), brother of the famous Abu Hamid al-Ghazali (d. 1111), talking to a disciple, from the Meetings of the Lovers (1552)

Walī (Arabic: ولي, plural ʾawliyāʾ أولياء) is an Arabic word whose literal meanings include "custodian", "protector", "helper", and "friend". In the vernacular, it is most commonly used by Muslims to indicate an Islamic saint, otherwise referred to by the more literal "friend of God". In the traditional Islamic understanding of saints, the saint is portrayed as someone "marked by [special] divine favour ... [and] holiness", and who is specifically "chosen by God and endowed with exceptional gifts, such as the ability to work miracles." The doctrine of saints was articulated by Islamic scholars very early on in Muslim history, and particular verses of the Quran and certain hadith were interpreted by early Muslim thinkers as "documentary evidence" of the existence of saints.

Since the first Muslim hagiographies were written during the period when Sufism began its rapid expansion, many of the figures who later came to be regarded as the major saints in Sunni Islam were the early Sufi mystics, like Hasan of Basra (d. 728), Farqad Sabakhi (d. 729), Dawud Tai (d. 777-81), Rabi'a al-'Adawiyya (d. 801), Ma'ruf al-Karkhi (d. 815), and Junayd of Baghdad (d. 910). From the twelfth to the fourteenth century, "the general veneration of saints, among both people and sovereigns, reached its definitive form with the organization of Sufism ... into orders or brotherhoods." In the common expressions of Islamic piety of this period, the saint was understood to be "a contemplative whose state of spiritual perfection ... [found] permanent expression in the teaching bequeathed to his disciples."

===== Miracles =====
In Islamic mysticism, karamat (Arabic: کرامات karāmāt, pl. of کرامة karāmah, lit. generosity, high-mindedness) refers to supernatural wonders performed by Muslim saints. In the technical vocabulary of Islamic religious sciences, the singular form karama has a sense similar to charism, a favour or spiritual gift freely bestowed by God. The marvels ascribed to Islamic saints have included supernatural physical actions, predictions of the future, and "interpretation of the secrets of hearts". Historically, a "belief in the miracles of saints (karāmāt al-awliyāʾ, literally 'marvels of the friends [of God]')" has been "a requirement in Sunni Islam".

===== Shrines =====
A dargah (Persian: درگاه dargâh or درگه dargah, also in Punjabi and Urdu) is a shrine built over the grave of a revered religious figure, often a Sufi saint or dervish. Sufis often visit the shrine for ziyarat, a term associated with religious visits and pilgrimages. Dargahs are often associated with Sufi eating and meeting rooms and hostels, called khanqah or hospices. They usually include a mosque, meeting rooms, Islamic religious schools (madrassas), residences for a teacher or caretaker, hospitals, and other buildings for community purposes.

===== Visitation =====
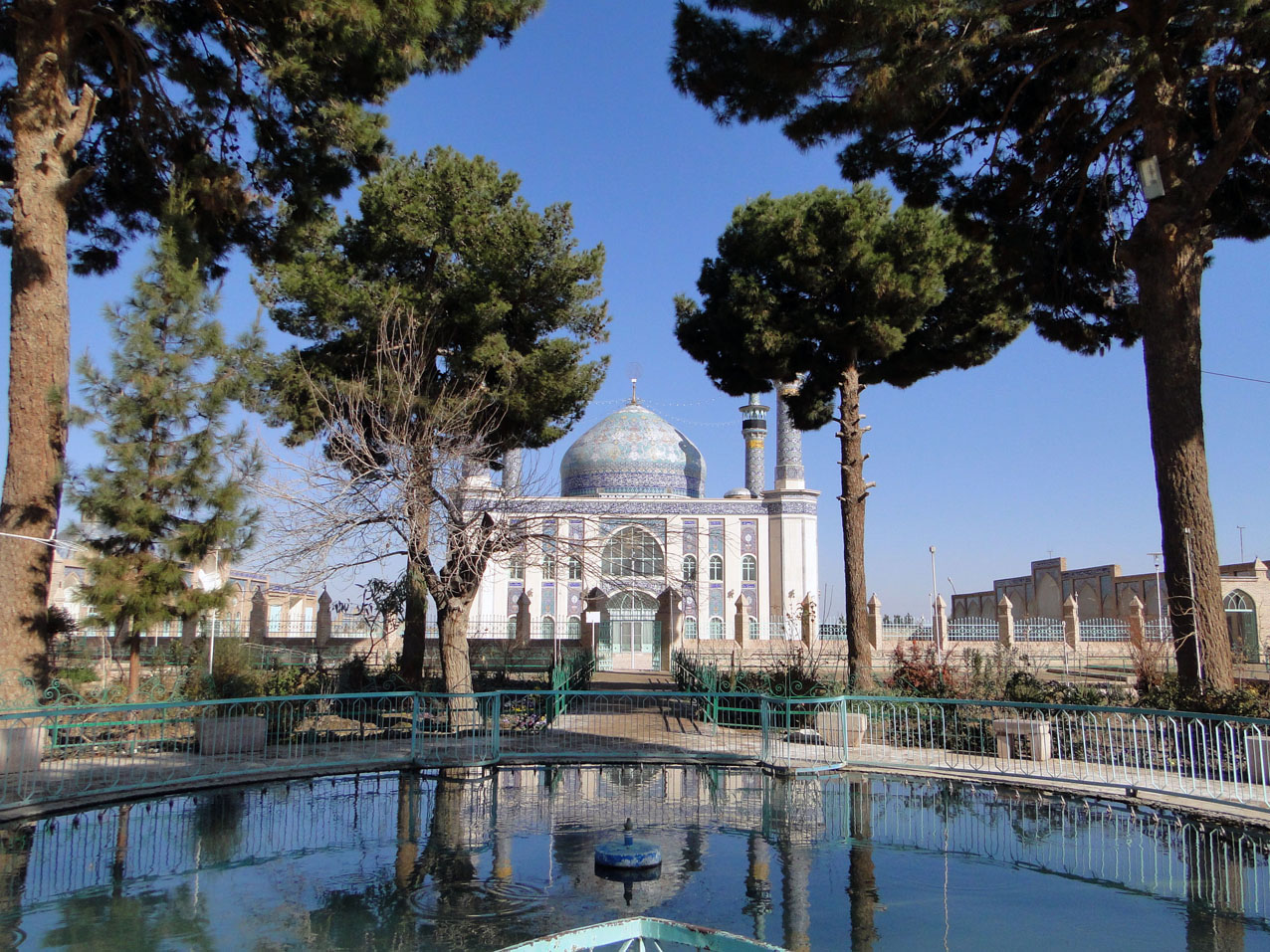
Sufi mosque in Esfahan, Iran

In popular Sufism (i.e. devotional practices that have achieved currency in world cultures through Sufi influence), one common practice is to visit or make pilgrimages to the tombs of saints, renowned scholars, and righteous people. This is a particularly common practice in South Asia, where famous tombs include such saints as Sayyid Ali Hamadani in Kulob, Tajikistan; Afāq Khoja, near Kashgar, China; Lal Shahbaz Qalandar in Sindh; Ali Hujwari in Lahore, Pakistan; Bahauddin Zakariya in Multan Pakistan; Moinuddin Chishti in Ajmer, India; Nizamuddin Auliya in Delhi, India; and Shah Jalal in Sylhet, Bangladesh.

Likewise, in Fes, Morocco, a popular destination for such visitation is the Zaouia Moulay Idriss II and the yearly visitation to see the current sheikh of the Qadiri Boutchichi Tariqah, Sheikh Sidi Hamza al Qadiri al Boutchichi to celebrate the Mawlid (which is usually televised on Moroccan National television). This action has voiced particular condemnation by the Salafis.

== Traditional Islamic thought and Sufism ==
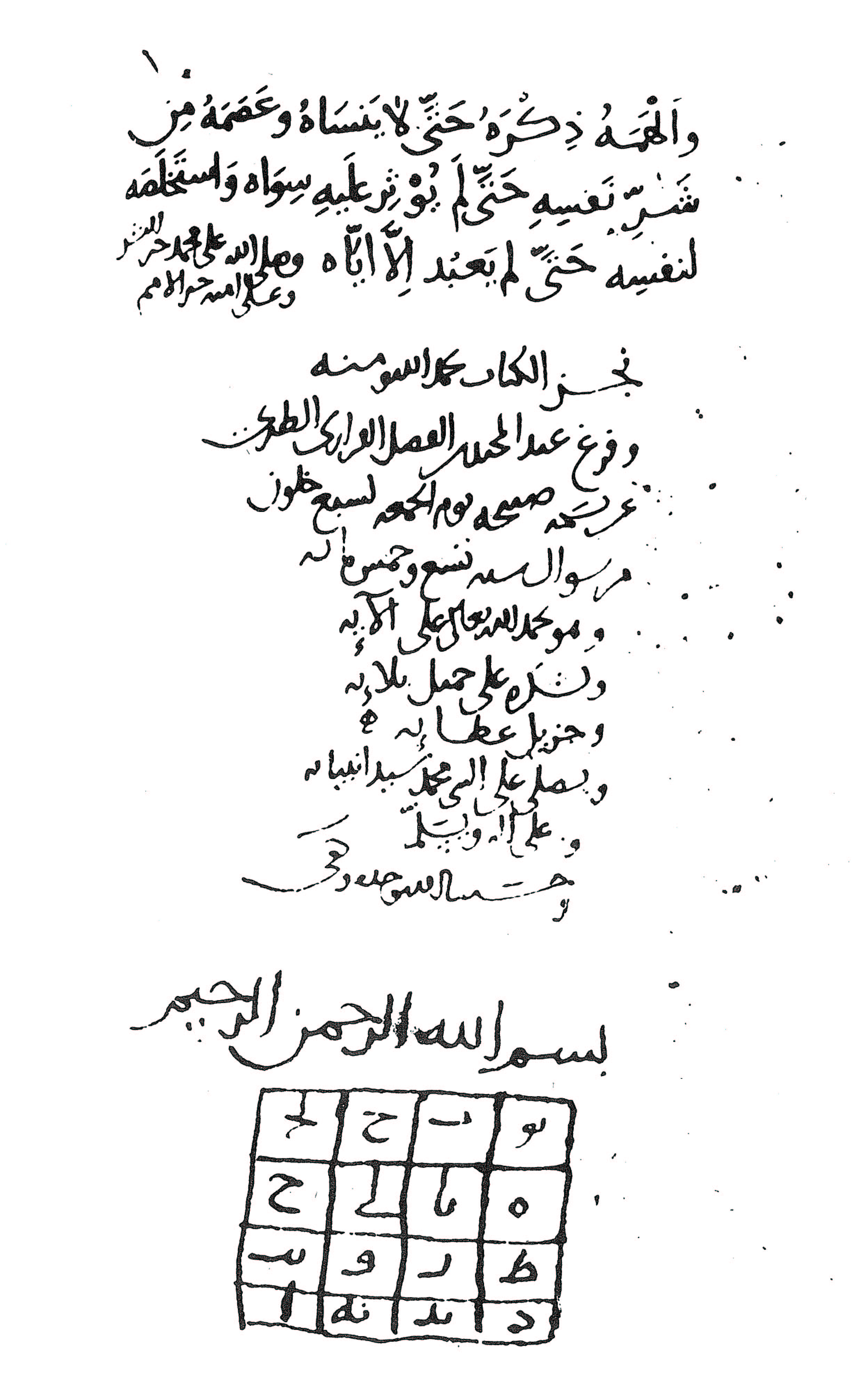
The works of Al-Ghazali firmly defended the concepts of Sufism within the Islamic faith.

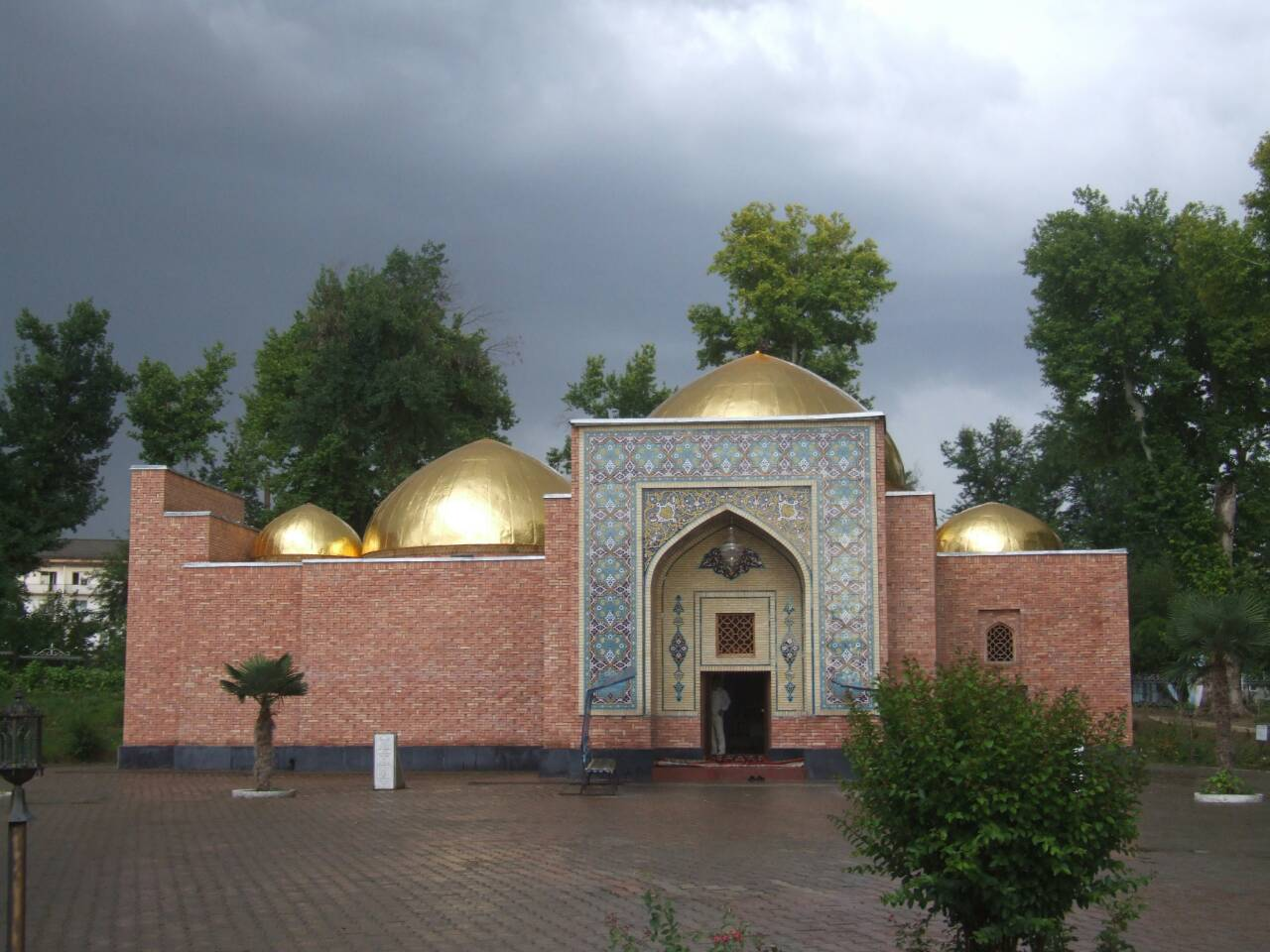
Tomb of Sayyid Ali Hamadani, Kulob, Tajikistan

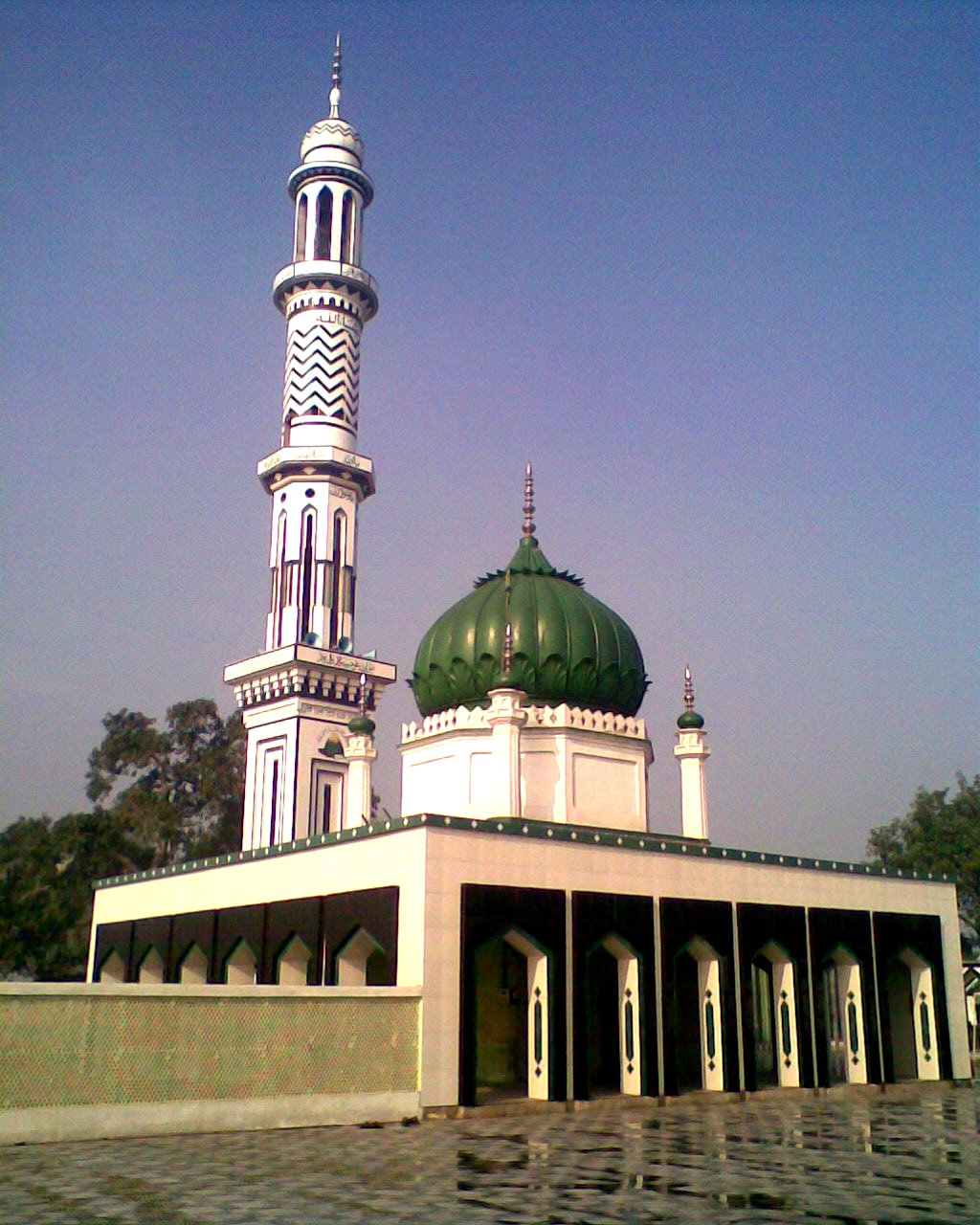
Urs of Islamic Naqshbandi saints of Allo Mahar is celebrated on 23 March every year.

The literature of Sufism emphasises highly subjective matters that resist outside observation, such as the subtle states of the heart. Often, these resist direct reference or description, with the consequence that the authors of various Sufi treatises resorted to allegorical language. For instance, much Sufi poetry refers to intoxication, which Islam expressly forbids. This usage of indirect language and the existence of interpretations by people who had no training in Islam or Sufism led to doubts being cast over the validity of Sufism as a part of Islam. Also, some groups emerged that considered themselves above the sharia and discussed Sufism as a method of bypassing the rules of Islam in order to attain salvation directly. This was disapproved of by traditional scholars.

For these and other reasons, the relationship between traditional Islamic scholars and Sufism is complex, and a range of scholarly opinions on Sufism in Islam has been the norm. Some scholars, such as Al-Ghazali, helped propagate it, while others opposed it. William Chittick explains the position of Sufism and Sufis this way:

In short, Muslim scholars who focused their energies on understanding the normative guidelines for the body came to be known as jurists, and those who held that the most important task was to train the mind in achieving correct understanding came to be divided into three main schools of thought: theology, philosophy, and Sufism. This leaves us with the third domain of human existence, the spirit. Most Muslims who devoted their major efforts to developing the spiritual dimensions of the human person came to be known as Sufis.

=== Sufism versus Islamic law ===
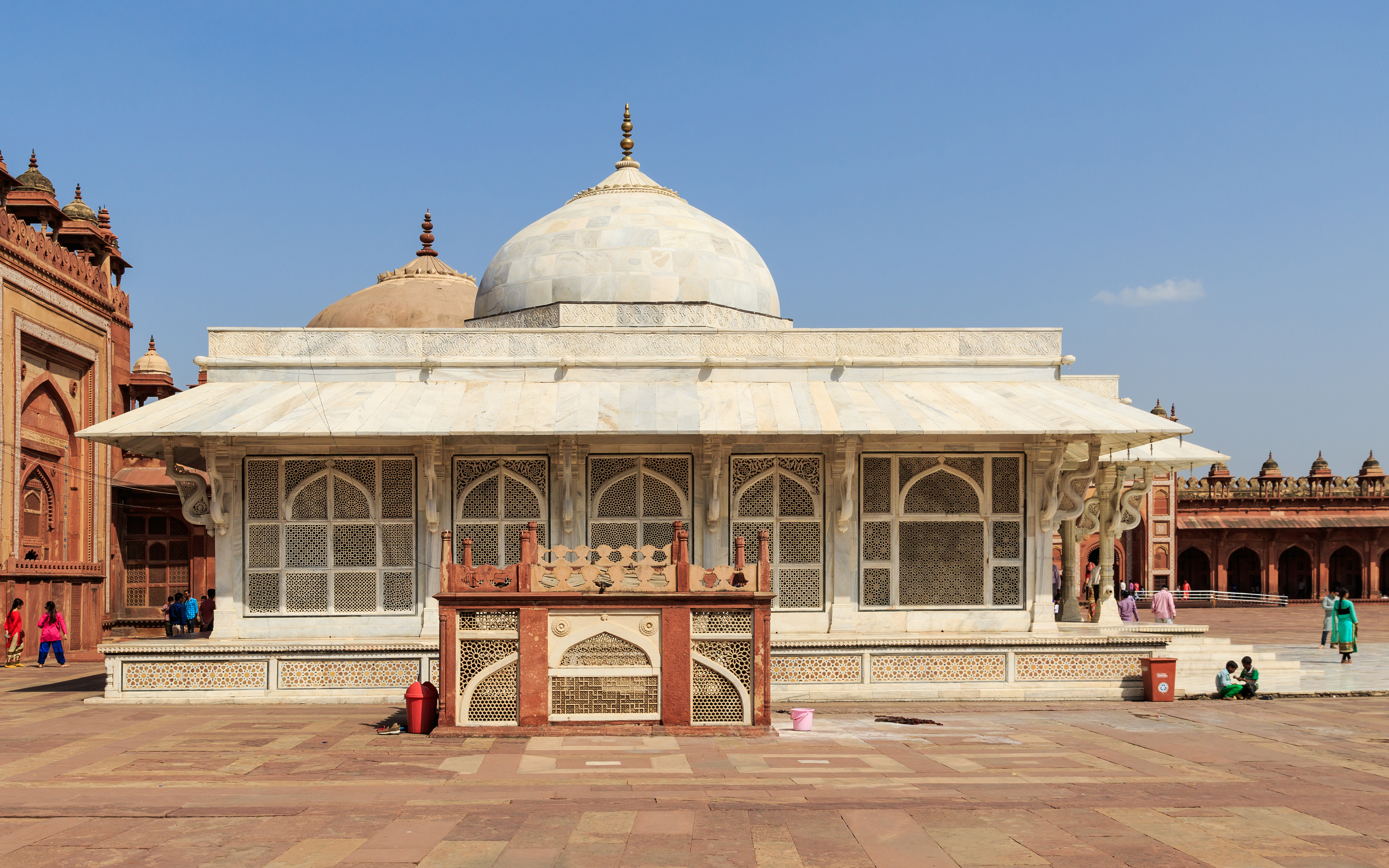
Tomb of Salim Chishti, Fatehpur Sikri, Agra, Uttar Pradesh, India

Sufis believe the sharia (exoteric "canon"), tariqa ("order") and haqiqa ("truth") are mutually interdependent. Sufism leads the adept, called a salik ('wayfarer'), in their sulûk ('road') through different stations (maqāmāt) until they reaches their goal: tawhid, the confession that God is One. Ibn Arabi wrote, "When we see someone in this Community who claims to be able to guide others to God, but is remiss in but one rule of the Sacred Law—even if he manifests miracles that stagger the mind—asserting that his shortcoming is a special dispensation for him, we do not even turn to look at him, for such a person is not a sheikh, nor is he speaking the truth, for no one is entrusted with the secrets of God Most High save one in whom the ordinances of the Sacred Law are preserved (Jamiʿ karamat al-awliyaʾ)".

The relationship between Sufism and Islamic Law cannot be characterised by a single narrative. Rather than a static dichotomy between 'legalism' and 'mysticism,' historical evidence reveals a dynamic continuum. This ranges from complete synthesis (as articulated by al-Ghazali) to symbolic reinterpretation, antinomian rejection (such as the Qalandariyya), and rigorous legalistic critique (such as Ibn Taymiyyah). It is related, moreover, that Malik ibn Anas, one of the founders of the four schools of Sunni law, was a strong proponent of combining the "inward science" (ilm al-bātin) of mystical knowledge with the "outward science" of jurisprudence. For example, the famous twelfth-century Maliki jurist and judge Qadi Iyad, later venerated as a saint throughout Muslim Iberia, narrated a tradition in which a man asked ibn Anas "about something in the inward science", to which he replied: "Truly none knows the inward science except those who know the outward science! When he knows the outward science and puts it into practice, God shall open for him the inward science – and that will not take place except by the opening of his heart and its enlightenment." In similar traditions, it is related that ibn Anas said: "He who practises Sufism (tasawwuf) without learning Sacred Law corrupts his faith (tazandaqa), while he who learns Sacred Law without practising Sufism corrupts himself (tafassaqa). Only he who combines the two proves true (tahaqqaqa)".

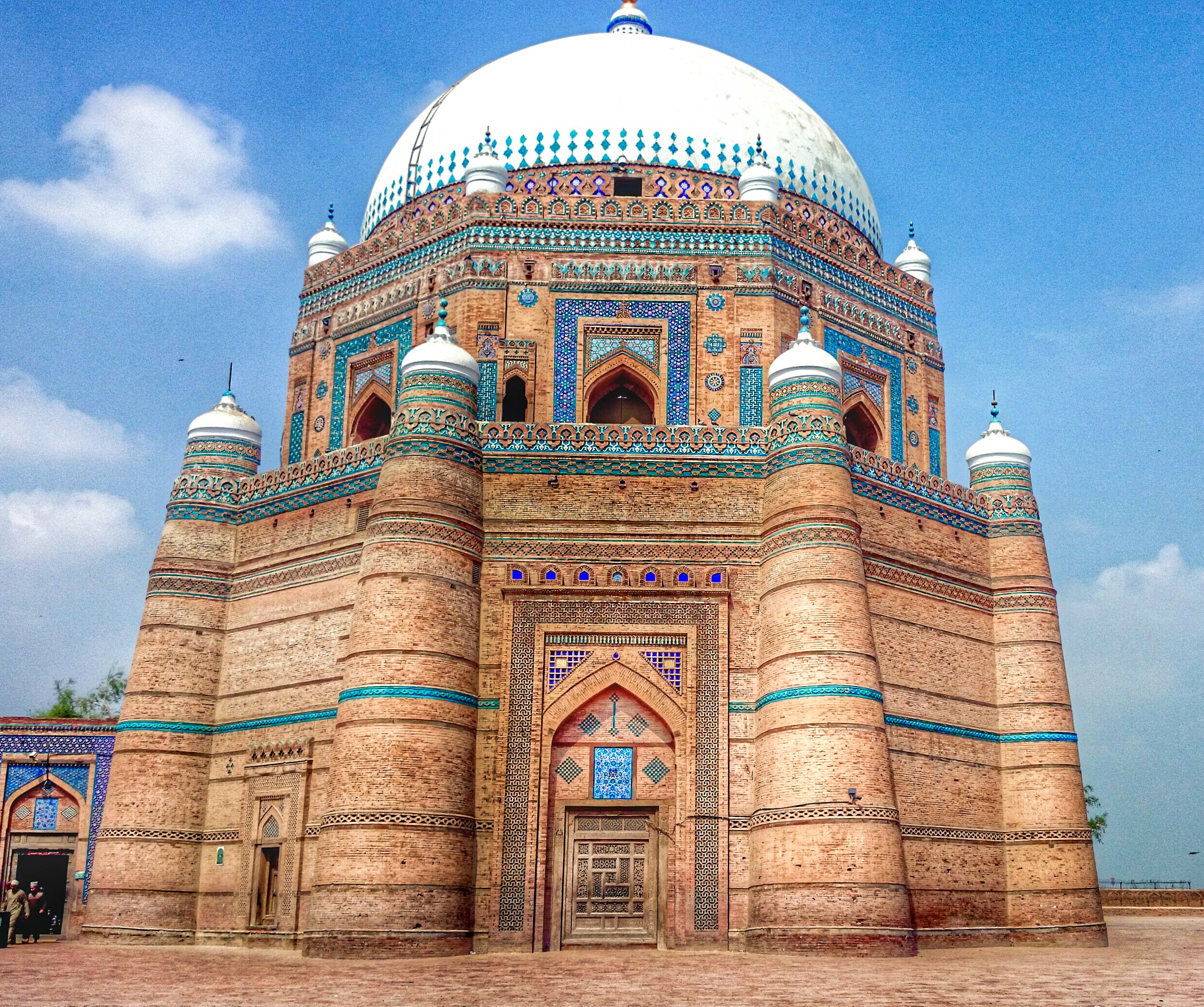
The Tomb of Shah Rukn-e-Alam (built 1324 A.D) is located in Multan, Pakistan. Known for its multitude of Sufi shrines, Multan is nicknamed The City of Saints.

To Sufis, the outer law consists of rules pertaining to worship, transactions, marriage, judicial rulings, and criminal law—what is often referred to, broadly, as "qanun". The inner law of Sufism consists of rules about repentance from sin, the purging of contemptible qualities and evil traits of character, and adornment with virtues and good character. To the Sufi, it is the transmission of divine light from the teacher's heart to the heart of the student, rather than worldly knowledge, that allows the adept to progress. They further believe that the teacher should attempt inerrantly to follow the divine law.

The Amman Message, a detailed statement issued by 200 leading Islamic scholars in 2005 in Amman, specifically recognised the validity of Sufism as a part of Islam. This was adopted by the Islamic world's political and temporal leadership at the Organisation of Islamic Cooperation summit in Mecca in December 2005, and by six other international Islamic scholarly assemblies, including the International Islamic Fiqh Academy of Jeddah, in July 2006. The definition of Sufism can vary widely across traditions (what is meant may be simple tazkiah rather than the various manifestations of Sufism across the Islamic world).

=== Persian influence on Sufism ===
Persians played a huge role in developing and systematising Islamic mysticism. One of the first to formalise Sufi principles was Junayd of Baghdad—a Persian from Baghdad. Other great Persian Sufi poets include Rudaki, Rumi, Attar of Nishapur, Nizami Ganjavi, Hafez, Sanai, Shams Tabrizi and Jami. Famous poems that still resonate across the Muslim world include the Masnavi, Bustan, The Conference of the Birds, and The Divān of Hafez.

=== Neo-Sufism ===
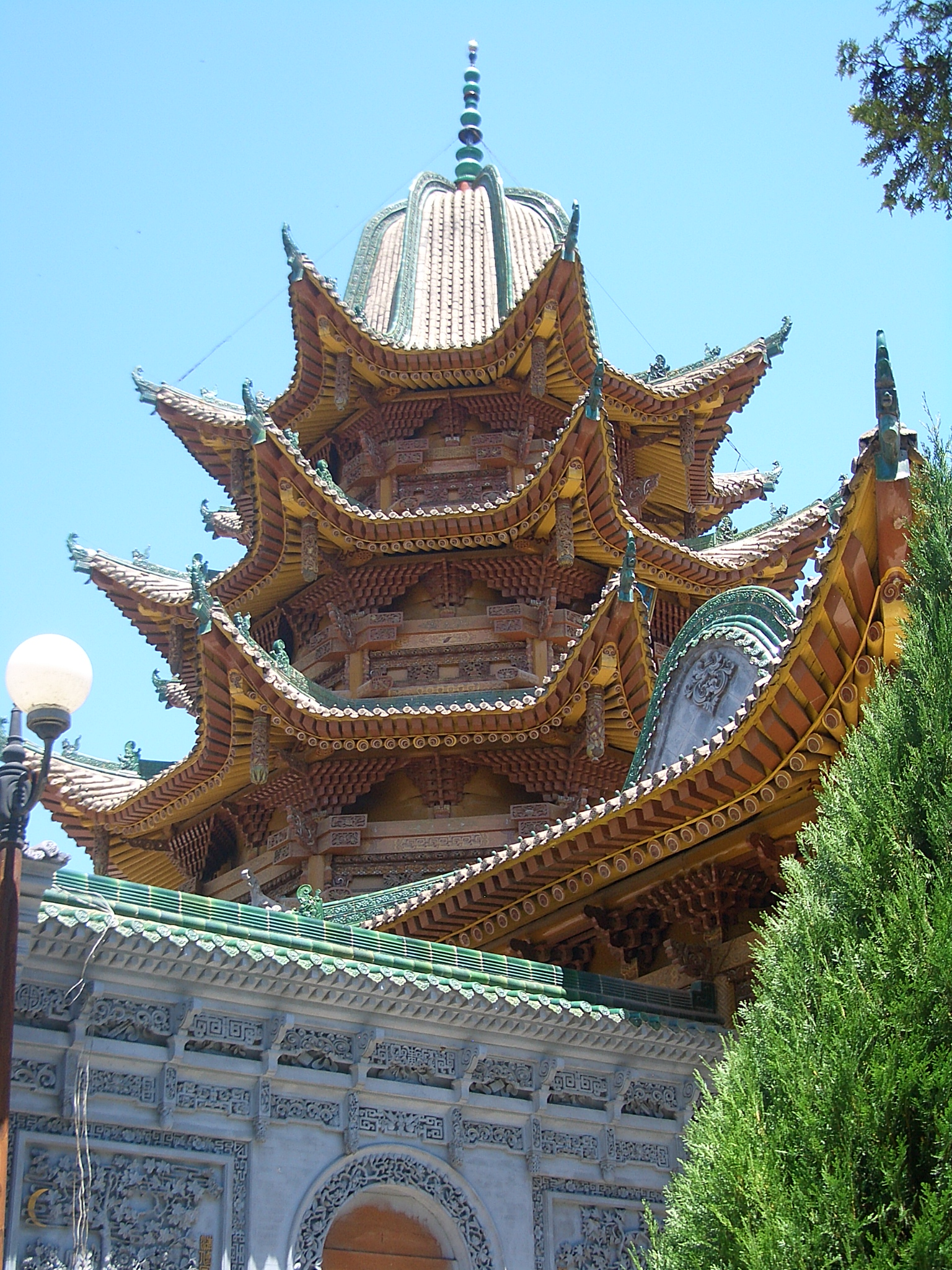
The mausoleum (gongbei) of Ma Laichi in Linxia City, China

The term neo-Sufism was originally coined by Fazlur Rahman Malik and used by other scholars to describe reformist currents among 18th-century Sufi orders, whose goal was to remove un-Islamic folk practices, antinomian tendencies among the uneducated masses and fringe groups and reassert the importance of Islamic law as the basis for inner spirituality and social activism. In recent times, it has been increasingly used by scholars like Mark Sedgwick in the opposite sense, to describe various forms of Sufi-influenced spirituality in the West, in particular the deconfessionalized spiritual movements which emphasise universal elements of the Sufi tradition and de-emphasise its Islamic context.

== Institutionalisation and practices ==
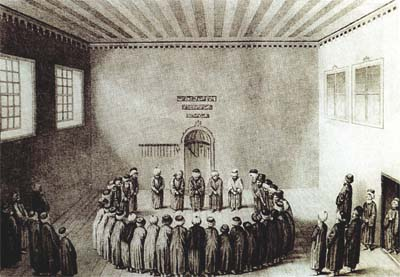
Sufi gathering engaged in dhikr

The devotional practices of Sufis vary widely. Prerequisites to practice include rigorous adherence to Islamic norms (ritual prayer in its five prescribed times each day, the fast of Ramadan, and so forth). Additionally, the seeker ought to be firmly grounded in supererogatory practices known from the life of Muhammad (such as the "sunnah prayers"). This is in accordance with the words, attributed to God, of the following, a famous Hadith Qudsi:

My servant draws near to Me through nothing I love more than that which I have made obligatory for him. My servant never ceases drawing near to Me through supererogatory works until I love him. Then, when I love him, I am his hearing through which he hears, his sight through which he sees, his hand through which he grasps, and his foot through which he walks.

It is also necessary for the seeker to have a correct creed (aqidah), and to embrace with certainty its tenets. The seeker must also, of necessity, turn away from sins, love of this world, the love of company and renown, obedience to satanic impulse, and the promptings of the lower self. (The way in which this purification of the heart is achieved is outlined in certain books, but must be prescribed in detail by a Sufi master.) The seeker must also be trained to prevent the corruption of those good deeds which have accrued to his or her credit by overcoming the traps of ostentation, pride, arrogance, envy, and long hopes (meaning the hope for a long life allowing us to mend our ways later, rather than immediately, here and now).

Sufi practices, while attractive to some, are not a means for gaining knowledge. The traditional scholars of Sufism hold it as absolutely axiomatic that knowledge of God is not a psychological state generated through breath control. Thus, practice of "techniques" is not the cause, but instead the occasion for such knowledge to be obtained (if at all), given proper prerequisites and proper guidance by a master of the way. Furthermore, the emphasis on practices may obscure a far more important fact: The seeker is, in a sense, to become a broken person, stripped of all habits through the practice of (in the words of Imam Al-Ghazali) solitude, silence, sleeplessness, and hunger.

=== Dhikr ===
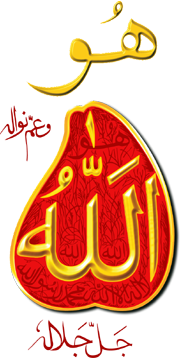
The name of Allah as written on the disciple's heart, according to the Sarwari Qadri Order

Dhikr is the remembrance of God commanded in the Quran for all Muslims through a specific devotional act, such as the repetition of divine names, supplications and aphorisms from hadith literature and the Quran. More generally, dhikr takes a wide range and various layers of meaning. This includes dhikr as any activity in which the Muslim maintains awareness of God. To engage in dhikr is to practise consciousness of the Divine Presence and love, or "to seek a state of godwariness". The Quran refers to Muhammad as the very embodiment of dhikr of God (65:10–11). Some types of dhikr are prescribed for all Muslims and do not require Sufi initiation or the prescription of a Sufi master because they are deemed to be good for every seeker under every circumstance.

The dhikr may slightly vary among each order. Some Sufi orders engage in ritualised dhikr ceremonies, or sema. Sema includes various forms of worship such as recitation, singing (the most well known being the Qawwali music of the Indian subcontinent), instrumental music, dance (most famously the Sufi whirling of the Mevlevi order), incense, meditation, ecstasy, and trance.

Some Sufi orders stress and place extensive reliance upon dhikr. This practice of dhikr is called Dhikr-e-Qulb (invocation of God within the heartbeats). The basic idea in this practice is to visualise the name of God as having been written on the disciple's heart.

=== Muraqaba ===
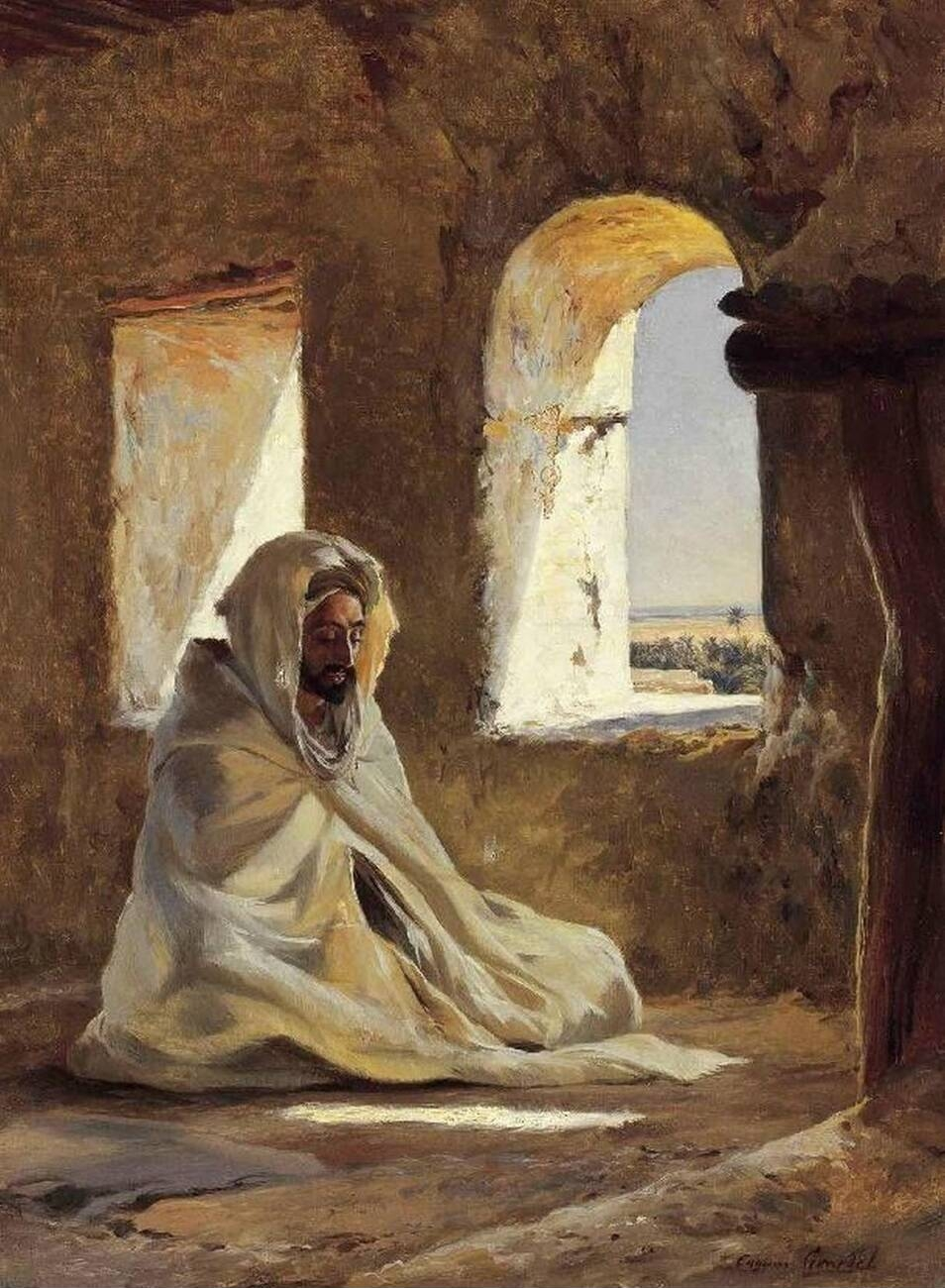
An Algerian Sufi in Murāqabah. La prière ('The Prayer') by Eugène Girardet.

The practice of muraqaba can be likened to the practices of meditation attested in many faith communities. While variation exists, one description of the practice within a Naqshbandi lineage reads as follows:

He is to collect all of his bodily senses in concentration, and to cut himself off from all preoccupation and notions that inflict themselves upon the heart. And thus he is to turn his full consciousness towards God Most High while saying three times: "Ilahî anta maqsûdî wa-ridâka matlûbî—my God, you are my Goal and Your good pleasure is what I seek". Then he brings to his heart the Name of the Essence—Allâh—and as it courses through his heart he remains attentive to its meaning, which is "Essence without likeness". The seeker remains aware that He is Present, Watchful, Encompassing of all, thereby exemplifying the meaning of his saying (may God bless him and grant him peace): "Worship God as though you see Him, for if you do not see Him, He sees you". And likewise the prophetic tradition: "The most favoured level of faith is to know that God is witness over you, wherever you may be".

=== Sufi whirling ===
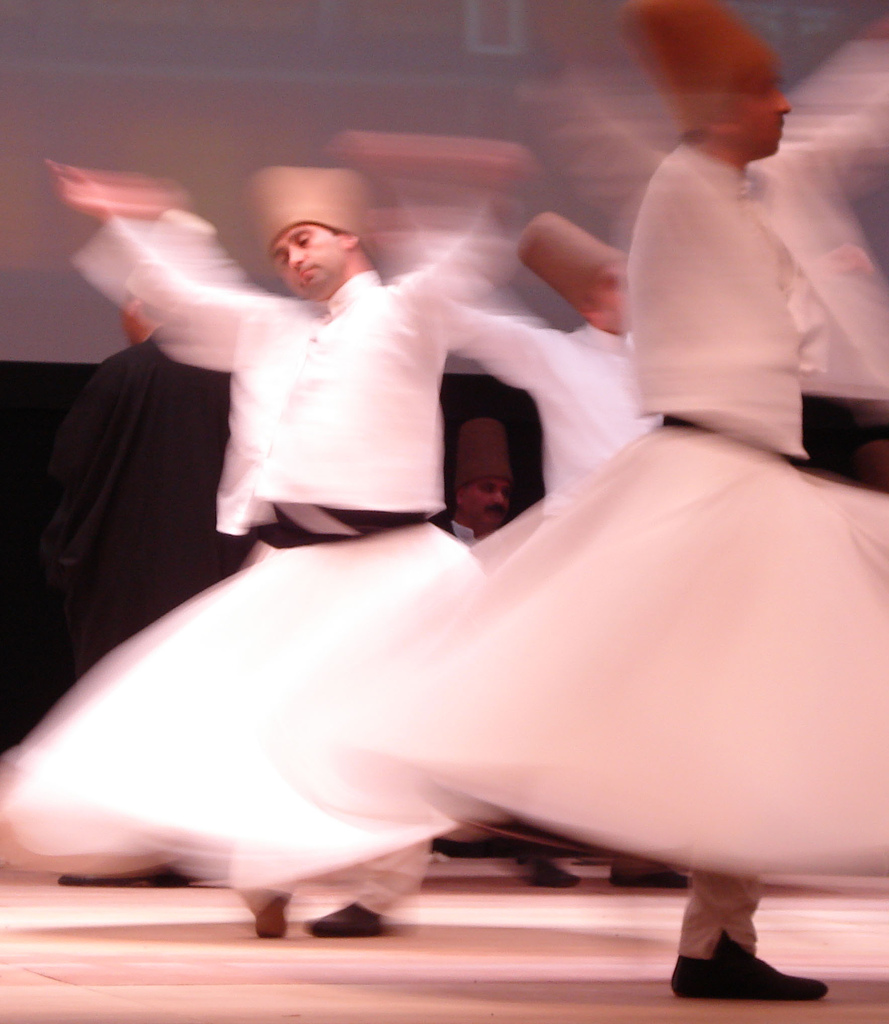
Whirling Dervishes, at Rumi Fest 2007

Sufi whirling (or Sufi spinning) is a form of Sama or physically active meditation which originated among some Sufis, and practised by the Sufi Dervishes of the Mevlevi order. It is a customary dance performed within the sema, through which dervishes (also called semazens, from Persian سماعزن) aim to reach the source of all perfection, or kemal. This is sought through abandoning one's nafs, egos or personal desires, by listening to the music, focusing on God, and spinning one's body in repetitive circles, which has been seen as a symbolic imitation of planets in the Solar System orbiting the Sun.

As explained by Mevlevi practitioners:

In the symbolism of the Sema ritual, the semazen's camel's hair hat (sikke) represents the tombstone of the ego; his wide, white skirt (tennure) represents the ego's shroud. By removing his black cloak (hırka), he is spiritually reborn to the truth. At the beginning of the Sema, by holding his arms crosswise, the semazen appears to represent the number one, thus testifying to God's unity. While whirling, his arms are open: his right arm is directed to the sky, ready to receive God's beneficence; his left hand, upon which his eyes are fastened, is turned toward the earth. The semazen conveys God's spiritual gift to those who are witnessing the Sema. Revolving from right to left around the heart, the semazen embraces all humanity with love. The human being has been created with love in order to love. Mevlâna Jalâluddîn Rumi says, "All loves are a bridge to Divine love. Yet, those who have not had a taste of it do not know!"

The traditional view of most orthodox Sunni Sufi orders, such as the Qadiriyya and the Chisti, as well as Sunni Muslim scholars in general, is that dancing with intent during dhikr or whilst listening to Sema is prohibited.

=== Singing ===
Kurdish Dervishes practise Sufism with playing Daf in Sulaymaniyah, Iraqi Kurdistan.

Musical instruments (except the Daf) have traditionally been considered as prohibited by the four orthodox Sunni schools, and the more orthodox Sufi tariqas also continued to prohibit their use. Throughout history most Sufi saints have stressed that musical instruments are forbidden. However some Sufi Saints permitted and encouraged it, whilst maintaining that musical instruments and female voices should not be introduced, although these are common practice today.

For example Qawwali was originally a form of Sufi devotional singing popular in the Indian subcontinent, and is now usually performed at dargahs. Sufi saint Amir Khusrau is said to have infused Persian, Arabic Turkish and Indian classical melodic styles to create the genre in the 13th century. The songs are classified into hamd, na'at, manqabat, marsiya or ghazal, among others.

Nowadays, the songs last for about 15 to 30 minutes, are performed by a group of singers, and instruments including the harmonium, tabla and dholak are used. Pakistani singing maestro Nusrat Fateh Ali Khan is credited with popularising qawwali all over the world.

== History ==
=== Origins ===
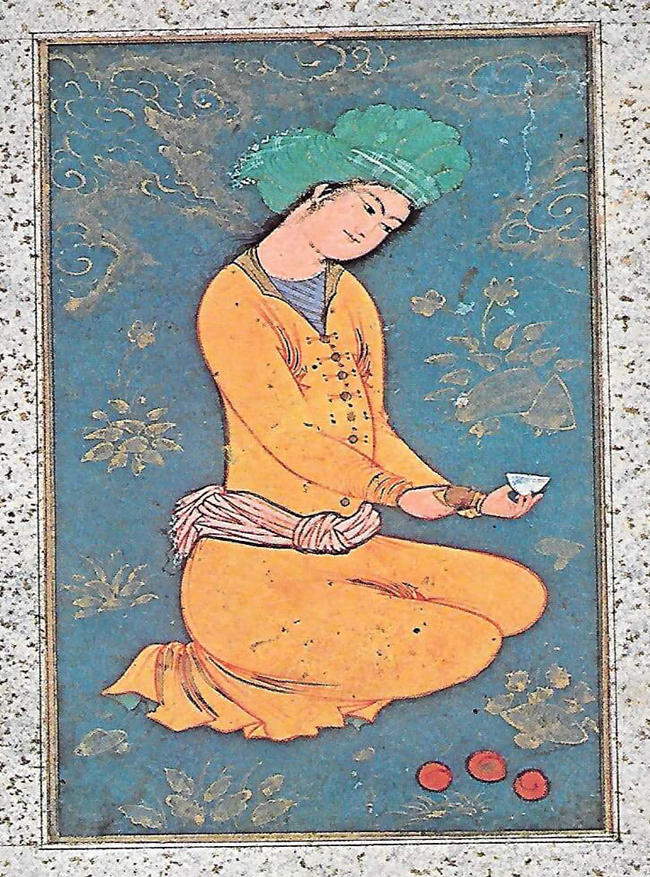
Rabia Basri, one of the earliest female Sufi mystics during the Umayyad Caliphate

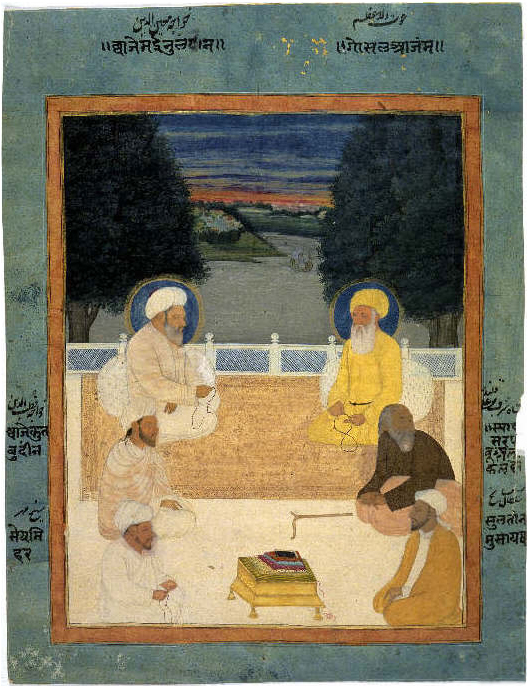
Six Sufi masters, c. 1760

The current consensus is that Sufism emerged in the Hejaz, present-day Saudi Arabia, and that it has existed as a practice of Muslims from the earliest days of Islam, even predating some sectarian divides.

Sufi orders are based on the bay'ah (Arabic: بَيْعَة, lit. 'pledge') that was given to Muhammad by his companions (ṣahabah). By pledging allegiance to Muhammad, the sahabah had committed themselves to the service of God.

Verily, those who give Bay'âh (pledge) to you (O Muhammad) they are giving Bay'âh (pledge) to God. The Hand of God is over their hands. Then whosoever breaks his pledge, breaks it only to his own harm, and whosoever fulfils what he has covenanted with God, He will bestow on him a great reward. — [Translation of Quran 48:10]

Sufis believe that by giving bayʿah (pledging allegiance) to a legitimate Sufi shaykh, one is pledging allegiance to Muhammad; therefore, a spiritual connection between the seeker and Muhammad is established. It is through Muhammad that Sufis aim to learn about, understand and connect with God. Ali is regarded as one of the major figures amongst the sahaba who have directly pledged allegiance to Muhammad, and Sufis maintain that through Ali, knowledge about Muhammad and a connection with Muhammad may be attained. Such a concept may be understood by the hadith, which Sufis regard as authentic, in which Muhammad said, "I am the city of knowledge, and Ali is its gate." Eminent Sufis such as Ali Hujwiri refer to Ali as having a very high ranking in Tasawwuf. Furthermore, Junayd of Baghdad regarded Ali as sheikh of the principles and practices of Tasawwuf.

Historian Jonathan A.C. Brown notes that during the lifetime of Muhammad, some companions were more inclined than others to "intensive devotion, pious abstemiousness and pondering the divine mysteries" more than Islam required, such as Abu Dharr al-Ghifari. Hasan al-Basri, a tabi', is considered a "founding figure" in the "science of purifying the heart".

Sufism emerged early on in Islamic history, partly as a reaction against the worldliness of the early Umayyad Caliphate (661–750) and mainly under the tutelage of Hasan al-Basri. Orientalists proposed a variety of origin theories regarding Sufism, such as that it originated as an Indo-European response to Semitic influence, Buddhism, Neo-Platonism, and Christian ascetism or Gnosticism. Modern academics and scholars however, have rejected early Orientalist theories asserting a non-Islamic origin of Sufism, Carl Ernst states that the tendency to try and disassociate Islam from Sufism was an attempt by Orientalists to create a divide between what they found attractive within Islamic civilisation (i.e. Islamic spirituality) and the negative stereotypes of Islam that were present in Britain. Hosein Nasr states that non-Islamic origin theories are false according to the point of view of Sufism. Many have asserted Sufism to be unique within the confines of the Islamic religion, and contend that Sufism developed from people like Bayazid Bastami, who, in his utmost reverence to the sunnah, refused to eat a watermelon because he did not find any proof that Muhammad ever ate it.

Practitioners of Sufism hold that in its early stages of development Sufism effectively referred to nothing more than the internalisation of Islam. According to one perspective, it is directly from the Qur'an, constantly recited, meditated, and experienced, that Sufism proceeded, in its origin and its development. Other practitioners have held that Sufism is the strict emulation of the way of Muhammad, through which the heart's connection to the Divine is strengthened.

Later developments of Sufism occurred from people like Dawud Tai and Bayazid Bastami. Early on Sufism was known for its strict adherence to the sunnah, for example it was reported that Bastami refused to eat a watermelon because he did not find any proof that Muhammad ever ate it. According to the late mediaeval mystic, the Persian poet Jami, Abd-Allah ibn Muhammad ibn al-Hanafiyyah (died c. 716) was the first person to be called a "Sufi". The term also had a strong connection with Kufa, with three of the earliest scholars to be called by the term being Abu Hashim al-Kufi, Jabir ibn Hayyan and Abdak al-Sufi. Later individuals included Hatim al-Attar, from Basra, and Al-Junayd al-Baghdadi. Others, such as Al-Harith al-Muhasibi and Sari al-Saqati, were not known as Sufis during their lifetimes, but later came to be identified as such due to their focus on tazkiah (purification).

Important contributions in writing are attributed to Uwais al-Qarani, Hasan of Basra, Harith al-Muhasibi, Abu Nasr as-Sarraj and Said ibn al-Musayyib. Ruwaym, from the second generation of Sufis in Baghdad, was also an influential early figure, as was Junayd of Baghdad; a number of early practitioners of Sufism were disciples of one of the two.

=== Sufi orders ===
Historically, Sufis have often belonged to "orders" known as tariqa (pl. ṭuruq) – congregations formed around a grand master wali who will trace their teaching through a chain of successive teachers back to Muhammad.

Within the Sufi tradition, the formation of the orders did not immediately produce lineages of master and disciple. There are few examples before the eleventh century of complete lineages going back to the Prophet Muhammad. Yet the symbolic importance of these lineages was immense: they provided a channel to divine authority through master-disciple chains. It was through such chains of masters and disciples that spiritual power and blessings were transmitted to both general and special devotees.

These orders meet for spiritual sessions (majalis) in meeting places known as zawiyas, khanqahs or tekke.

They strive for ihsan (perfection of worship), as detailed in a hadith: "Ihsan is to worship Allah as if you see Him; if you can't see Him, surely He sees you." Sufis regard Muhammad as al-Insān al-Kāmil, the complete human who personifies the attributes of Absolute Reality, and view him as their ultimate spiritual guide.

Sufi orders trace most of their original precepts from Muhammad through Ali ibn Abi Talib, with the notable exception of the Naqshbandi order, which traces its original precepts to Muhammad through Abu Bakr. However, it was not necessary to formally belong to a tariqa. In the Mediaeval period, Sufism was almost equal to Islam in general and not limited to specific orders.

Sufism had a long history already before the subsequent institutionalisation of Sufi teachings into devotional orders (tariqa, pl. tarîqât) in the early Middle Ages. The term tariqa is used for a school or order of Sufism, or especially for the mystical teaching and spiritual practices of such an order with the aim of seeking ḥaqīqah (ultimate truth). A tariqa has a murshid (guide) who plays the role of leader or spiritual director. The members or followers of a tariqa are known as murīdīn (singular murīd), meaning "desirous", viz. "desiring the knowledge of knowing God and loving God".

Over the years, Sufi orders have influenced and been adopted by various Shi'i movements, especially Isma'ilism, which led to the Safaviyya order's conversion to Shia Islam from Sunni Islam and the spread of Twelverism throughout Iran.

=== Sufism as an Islamic discipline ===
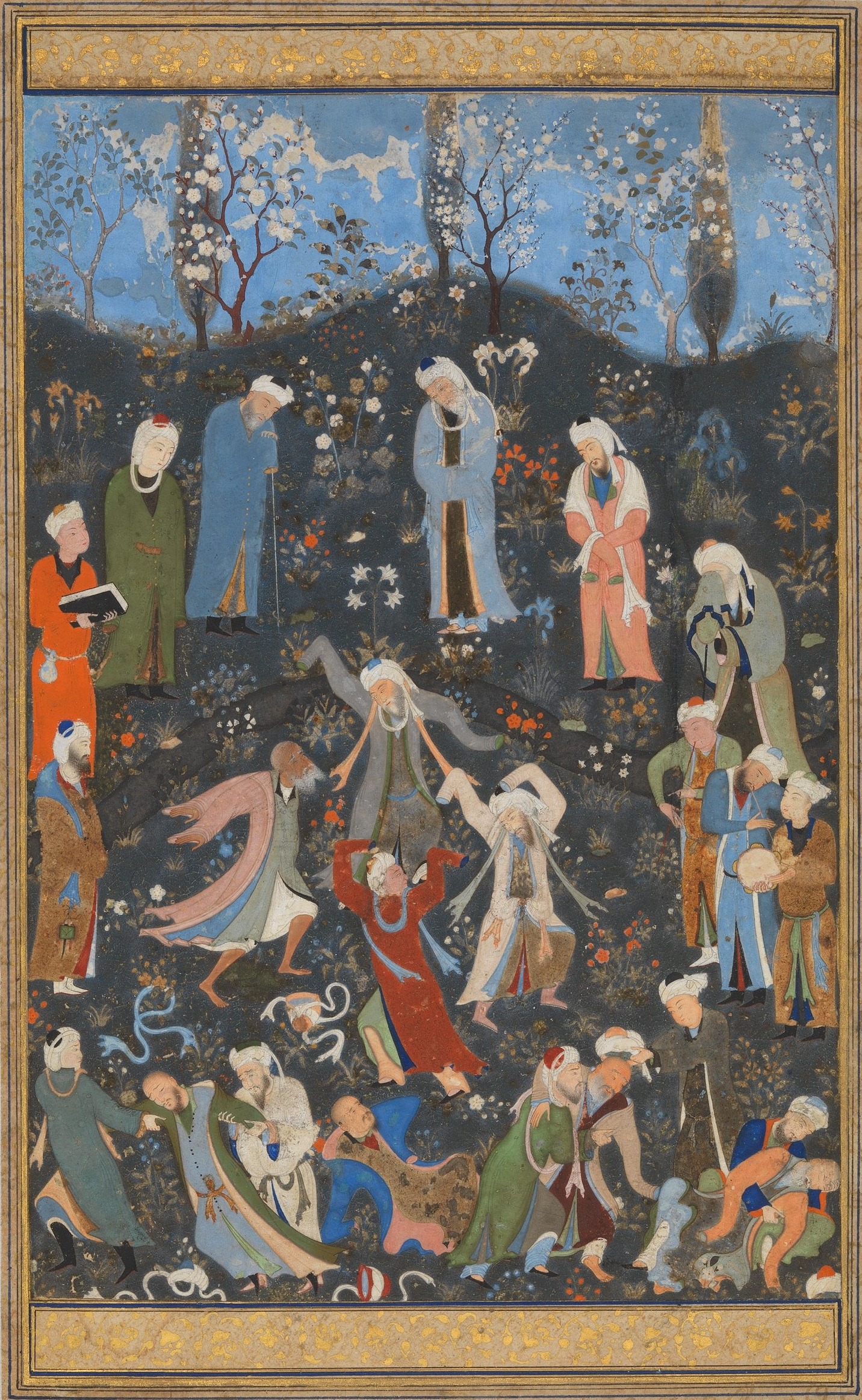
Dancing dervishes, by Kamāl ud-Dīn Behzād (c. 1480–1490)

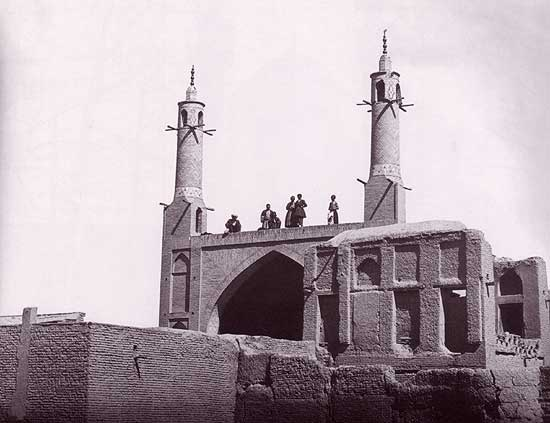
Monar Jonban, a "dancing" monument, built over the grave of the Sufi ascetic Amu Abdullah Suqla in 12th century. A person stands on top and shakes one minaret, causing the second minaret to move with the same oscillation.

Existing in both Sunni and Shia Islam, Sufism is not a distinct sect, as is sometimes erroneously assumed, but a method of approaching or a way of understanding the religion, which strives to take the regular practice of the religion to the "supererogatory level" through simultaneously "fulfilling ... [the obligatory] religious duties" and finding a "way and a means of striking a root through the 'narrow gate' in the depth of the soul out into the domain of the pure arid un-imprisonable Spirit which itself opens out onto the Divinity." Academic studies of Sufism confirm that Sufism, as a separate tradition from Islam apart from so-called pure Islam, is frequently a product of Western orientalism and modern Islamic fundamentalists.

As a mystic and ascetic aspect of Islam, it is considered as the part of Islamic teaching that deals with the purification of the inner self. By focusing on the more spiritual aspects of religion, Sufis strive to obtain direct experience of God by making use of "intuitive and emotional faculties" that one must be trained to use. Tasawwuf is regarded as a science of the soul that has always been an integral part of Orthodox Islam. In his Al-Risala al-Safadiyya, ibn Taymiyyah describes the Sufis as those who belong to the path of the Sunna and represent it in their teachings and writings.

Ibn Taymiyya's Sufi inclinations and his reverence for Sufis like Abdul-Qadir Gilani can also be seen in his hundred-page commentary on Futuh al-ghayb, covering only five of the seventy-eight sermons of the book, but showing that he considered tasawwuf essential within the life of the Islamic community.

Al-Ghazali narrates in Al-Munqidh min al-dalal:

The vicissitudes of life, family affairs and financial constraints engulfed my life and deprived me of the congenial solitude. The heavy odds confronted me and provided me with few moments for my pursuits. This state of affairs lasted for ten years, but whenever I had some spare and congenial moments I resorted to my intrinsic proclivity. During these turbulent years, numerous astonishing and indescribable secrets of life were unveiled to me. I was convinced that the group of Aulia (holy mystics) is the only truthful group who follow the right path, display best conduct and surpass all sages in their wisdom and insight. They derive all their overt or covert behaviour from the illumining guidance of the holy Prophet, the only guidance worth quest and pursuit.

=== Formalisation of doctrine ===
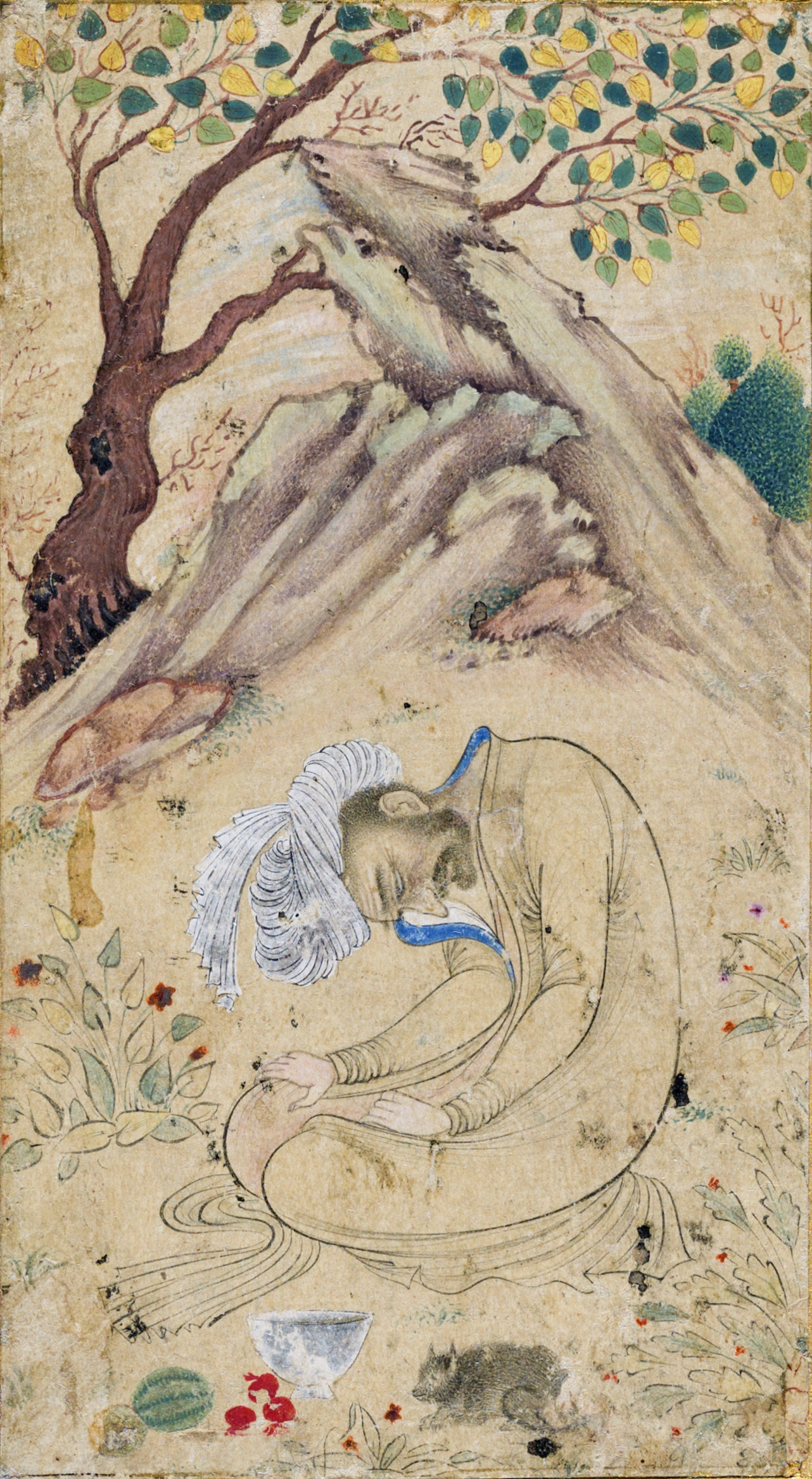
A Sufi in Ecstasy in a Landscape. Isfahan, Safavid Persia (c. 1650–1660), LACMA.

In the eleventh-century, Sufism, which had previously been a less "codified" trend in Islamic piety, began to be "ordered and crystallized" into orders which have continued until the present day. All these orders were founded by a major Islamic scholar, and some of the largest and most widespread included the Suhrawardiyya (after Abu al-Najib Suhrawardi [d. 1168]), Qadiriyya (after Abdul-Qadir Gilani [d. 1166]), the Rifa'iyya (after Ahmed al-Rifa'i [d. 1182]), the Chishtiyya (after Moinuddin Chishti [d. 1236]), the Shadiliyya (after Abul Hasan ash-Shadhili [d. 1258]), the Hamadaniyyah (after Sayyid Ali Hamadani [d. 1384]), the Naqshbandiyya (after Baha-ud-Din Naqshband Bukhari [d. 1389]). Contrary to popular perception in the West, however, neither the founders of these orders nor their followers ever considered themselves to be anything other than orthodox Sunni Muslims, and in fact all of these orders were attached to one of the four orthodox legal schools of Sunni Islam. Thus, the Qadiriyya order was Hanbali, with its founder, Abdul-Qadir Gilani, being a renowned jurist; the Chishtiyya was Hanafi; the Shadiliyya order was Maliki; and the Naqshbandiyya order was Hanafi. Thus, it is precisely because it is historically proven that "many of the most eminent defenders of Islamic orthodoxy, such as Abdul-Qadir Gilani, Ghazali, and the Sultan Ṣalāḥ ad-Dīn (Saladin) were connected with Sufism" that the popular studies of writers like Idries Shah are continuously disregarded by scholars as conveying the fallacious image that "Sufism" is somehow distinct from "Islam". Nile Green has observed that, in the Middle Ages, Sufism more or less was Islam.

=== Growth of influence ===
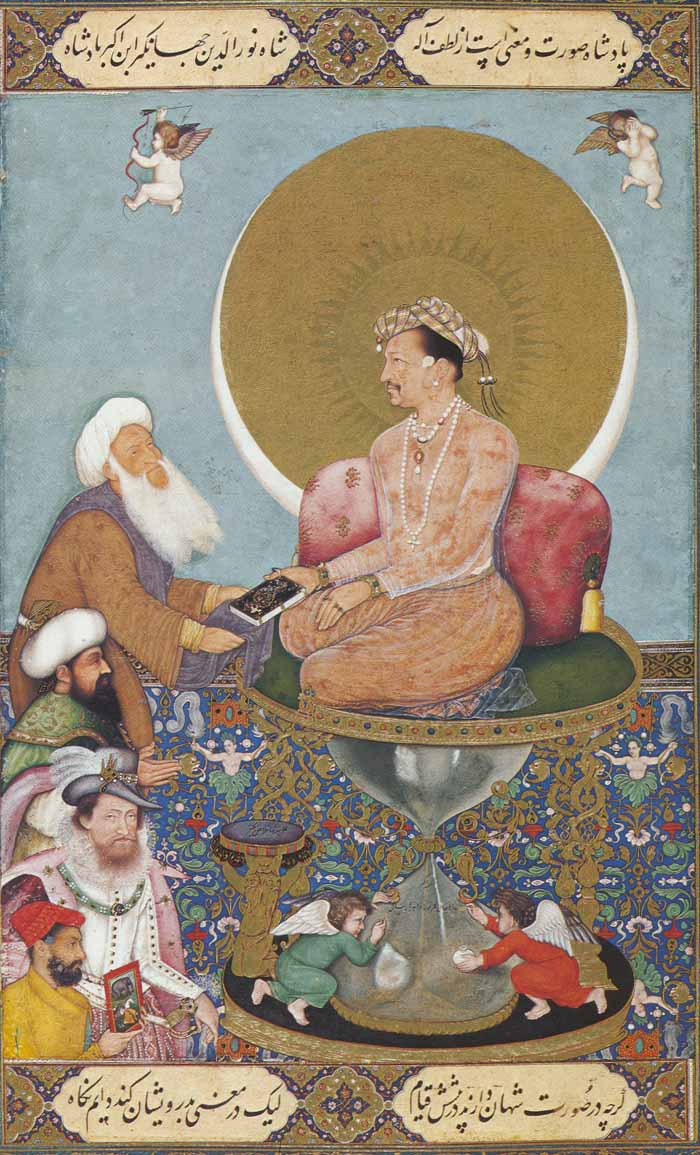
A Mughal miniature dated from the early 1620s depicting the Mughal emperor Jahangir (d. 1627) preferring an audience with Sufi saint to his contemporaries, the Ottoman sultan and the king of England, James I (d. 1625); the picture is inscribed in Persian: "Though outwardly shahs stand before him, he fixes his gazes on dervishes."

Historically, Sufism became "an incredibly important part of Islam" and "one of the most widespread and omnipresent aspects of Muslim life" in Islamic civilisation from the early mediaeval period onwards, when it began to permeate nearly all major aspects of Sunni Islamic life in regions stretching from India and Iraq to the Balkans and Senegal.

The rise of Islamic civilisation coincides strongly with the spread of Sufi philosophy in Islam. The spread of Sufism has been considered a definitive factor in the spread of Islam, and in the creation of integrally Islamic cultures, especially in Africa and Asia. The Senussi tribes of Libya and the Sudan are one of the strongest adherents of Sufism. Sufi poets and philosophers such as Khoja Akhmet Yassawi, Rumi, and Attar of Nishapur (c. 1145 – c. 1221) greatly enhanced the spread of Islamic culture in Anatolia, Central Asia, and South Asia. Sufism also played a role in creating and propagating the culture of the Ottoman world, and in resisting European imperialism in North Africa and South Asia.

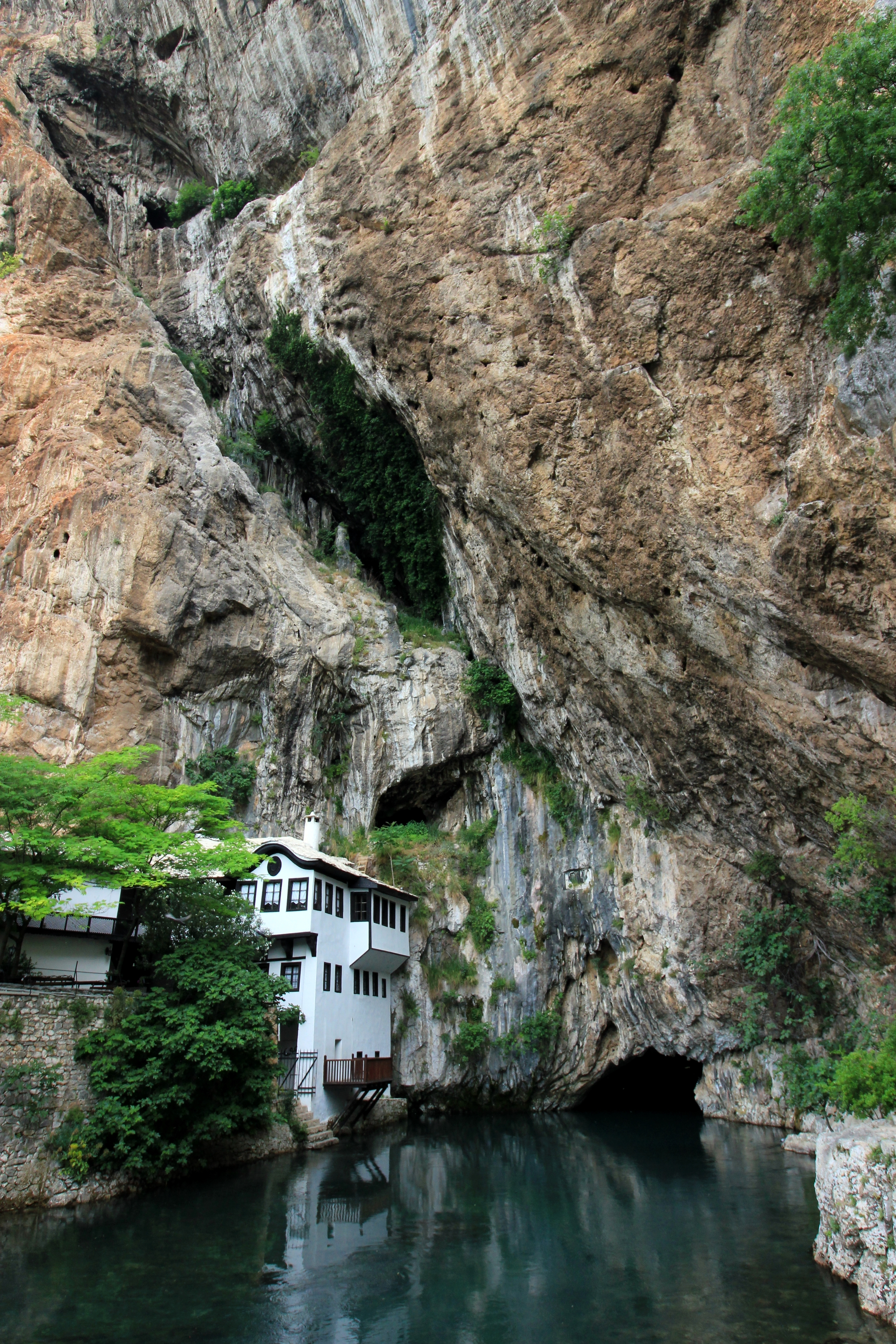
Blagaj Tekke, built c. 1520 next to the Buna wellspring cavern beneath a high vertical karstic cliff, in Blagaj, Mostar, Bosnia. The natural and architectural ensemble, proposed for UNESCO inscription, forms a spatially and topographically self-contained ensemble, and is a National Monument of Bosnia.

Between the 13th and 16th centuries, Sufism produced a flourishing intellectual culture throughout the Islamic world, a "Renaissance" whose physical artefacts survive. In many places a person or group would endow a waqf to maintain a lodge (known variously as a zawiya, khanqah, or tekke) to provide a gathering place for Sufi adepts, as well as lodging for itinerant seekers of knowledge. The same system of endowments could also pay for a complex of buildings, such as that surrounding the Süleymaniye Mosque in Istanbul, including a lodge for Sufi seekers, a hospice with kitchens where these seekers could serve the poor and/or complete a period of initiation, a library, and other structures. No important domain in the civilisation of Islam remained unaffected by Sufism in this period.

=== Modern era ===
Opposition to Sufi teachers and orders from more literalist and legalist strains of Islam existed in various forms throughout Islamic history. It took on a particularly violent form in the 18th century with the creation of the Wahhabi movement.

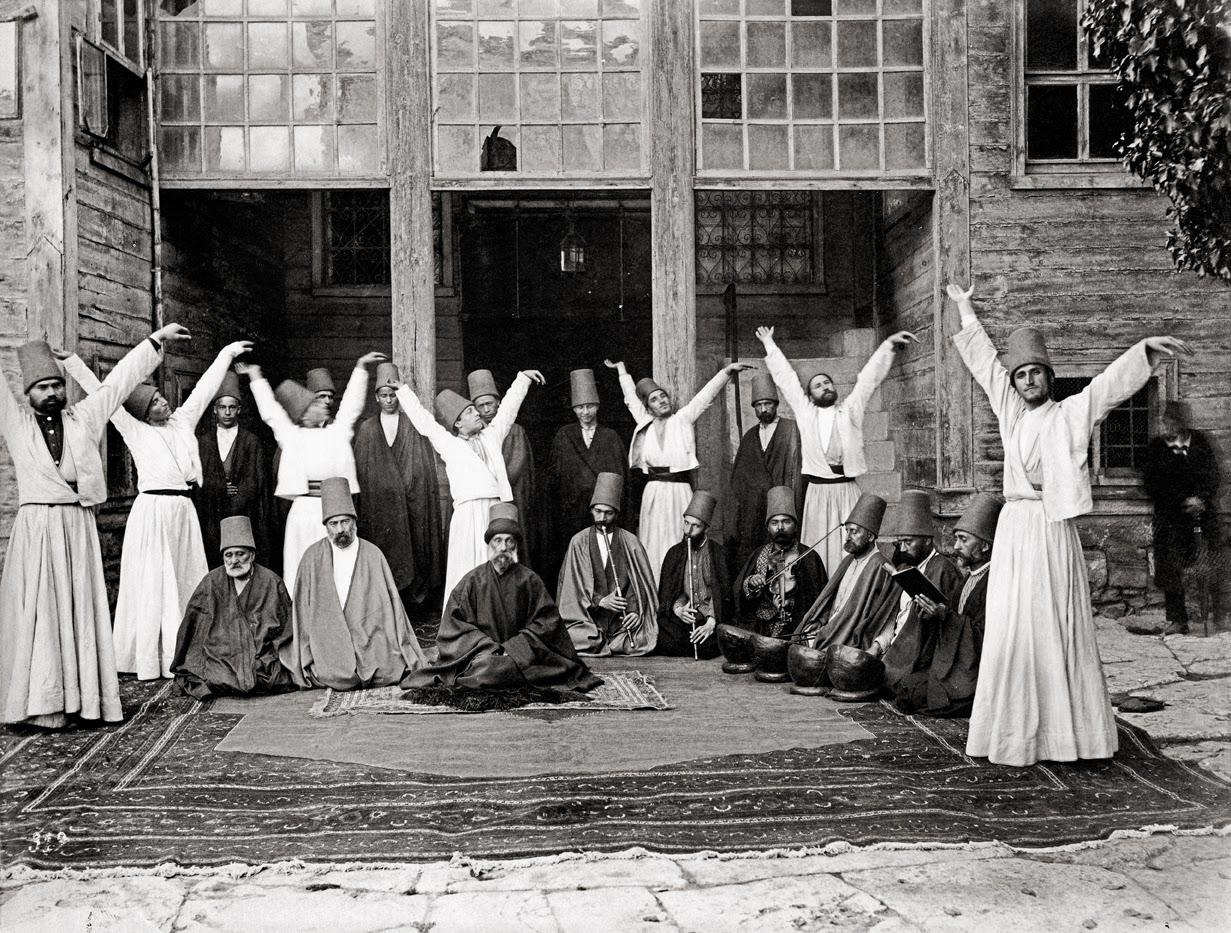
Whirling dervishes of the Mevlevi Order photographed by Pascal Sébah (Istanbul, 1870)

Around the turn of the 20th century, Sufi rituals and doctrines also came under sustained criticism from modernist Islamic reformers, liberal nationalists, and, some decades later, socialist movements in the Muslim world. Sufi orders were accused of fostering popular superstitions, resisting modern intellectual attitudes, and standing in the way of progressive reforms. Ideological attacks on Sufism were reinforced by agrarian and educational reforms, as well as new forms of taxation, which were instituted by Westernising national governments, undermining the economic foundations of Sufi orders. The extent to which Sufi orders declined in the first half of the 20th century varied from country to country, but by the middle of the century the very survival of the orders and traditional Sufi lifestyle appeared doubtful to many observers.

However, defying these predictions, Sufism and Sufi orders have continued to play a major role in the Muslim world, also expanding into Muslim-minority countries. Its ability to articulate an inclusive Islamic identity with greater emphasis on personal and small-group piety has made Sufism especially well-suited for contexts characterised by religious pluralism and secularist perspectives.

In the modern world, the classical interpretation of Sunni orthodoxy, which sees in Sufism an essential dimension of Islam alongside the disciplines of jurisprudence and theology, is represented by institutions such as Egypt's Al-Azhar University and Zaytuna College, with Al-Azhar's current Grand Imam Ahmed el-Tayeb recently defining "Sunni orthodoxy" as being a follower "of any of the four schools of [legal] thought (Hanafi, Shafi’i, Maliki or Hanbali) and ... [also] of the Sufism of Imam Junayd of Baghdad in doctrines, manners and [spiritual] purification."

The relationship of Sufi orders to modern societies is usually defined by their relationship to governments.

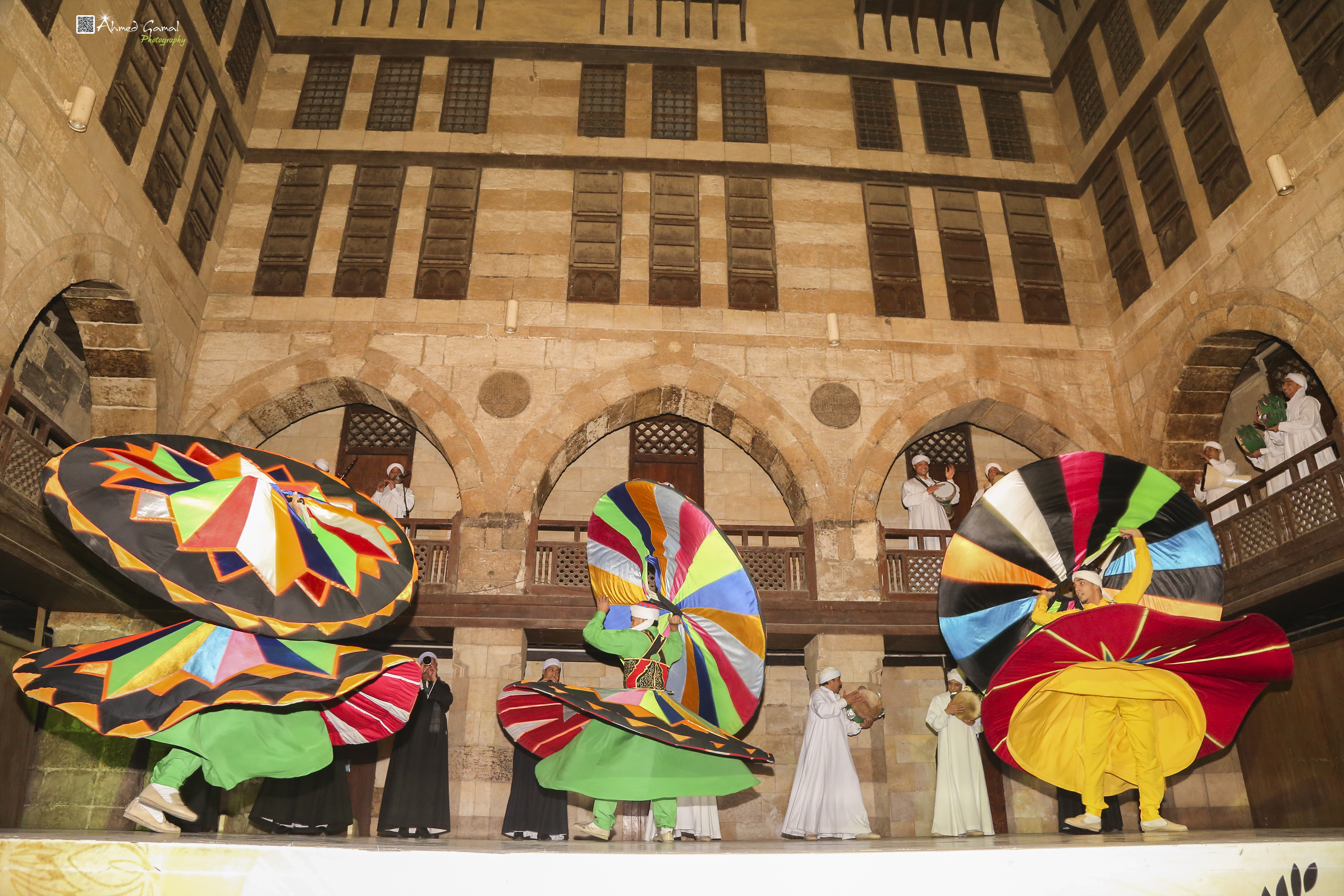
Egyptian Sufi Tanoura twirling in Muizz Street, Cairo

Turkey, Persia and The Indian Subcontinent have all been a centre for many Sufi lineages and orders. The Bektashi were closely affiliated with the Ottoman Janissaries and are the heart of Turkey's large and mostly liberal Alevi population. They have spread westwards to Cyprus, Greece, Albania, Bulgaria, North Macedonia, Bosnia and Herzegovina, Kosovo, and, more recently, to the United States, via Albania. Sufism is popular in such African countries as Egypt, Tunisia, Algeria, Sudan, Morocco, and Senegal, where it is seen as a mystical expression of Islam. Mbacke suggests that one reason Sufism has taken hold in Senegal is because it can accommodate local beliefs and customs, which tend toward the mystical.

The life of the Algerian Sufi master Abdelkader El Djezairi is instructive in this regard. Notable as well are the lives of Amadou Bamba and El Hadj Umar Tall in West Africa, and Sheikh Mansur and Imam Shamil in the Caucasus. In the twentieth century, some Muslims have called Sufism a superstitious religion which holds back Islamic achievement in the fields of science and technology.

A number of Westerners have embarked with varying degrees of success on the path of Sufism. One of the first to return to Europe as an official representative of a Sufi order, and with the specific purpose to spread Sufism in Western Europe, was the Swedish-born wandering Sufi Ivan Aguéli. René Guénon, the French scholar, became a Sufi in the early twentieth century and was known as Sheikh Abdul Wahid Yahya. His manifold writings defined the practice of Sufism as the essence of Islam, but also pointed to the universality of its message. Spiritualists, such as George Gurdjieff, may or may not conform to the tenets of Sufism as understood by orthodox Muslims.

== Prominent Sufis ==
=== Rabi'a Al-'Adawiyya ===
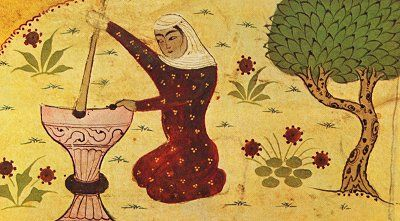
Depiction of Rabi'a grinding grain from a Persian dictionary

Rābiʼa al-ʼAdawiyya or Rabia Basri was a Sufi saint, one of the earliest Sufi mystics and an influential religious figure from Iraq. Rabi'a was born of very poor origin, but was captured by bandits at a later age and sold into slavery. She was, however, released by her master when he awoke one night to see the light of sanctity shining above her head. Prominent Sufi leader Hasan of Basra is said "I passed one whole night and day with Rabi'a ... it never passed through my mind that I was a man nor did it occur to her that she was a woman... when I saw her I saw myself as bankrupt and Rabi'a as truly sincere." Rabi'a al-Adawiyya is known for her teachings and emphasis on the centrality of the love of God to a holy life. She is said to have proclaimed, running down the streets of Basra, Iraq:

O God! If I worship You for fear of Hell, burn me in Hell, and if I worship You in hope of Paradise, exclude me from Paradise. But if I worship You for Your Own sake, grudge me not Your everlasting Beauty.

— Rabi'a al-Adawiyya

There are different opinions about the death and resting place of Rabia Basri. Some believe her resting place to be Jerusalem whereas others believe it to be Basra.

=== Junayd of Baghdad ===
Junayd al-Baghdadi (830–910) was one of the earlier Sufis. He was a Persian Sufi and one of the most famous of the early Islamic saints and is a central figure in the spiritual lineages of many Sufi orders. Junayd al-Baghdadi taught in Baghdad throughout his lifetime and was an important figure in the development of Sufi beliefs. Like Hasan of Basra before him, was widely revered by his students and disciples as well as quoted by other mystics. Because of his importance among Sufis, Junayd was often referred to as the "Sultan".

=== Bayazid Bastami ===
Bayazid Bastami was a recognised and influential Sufi personality from the Tayfuriyya order. Bastami was born in 804 in Bastam. Bayazid is regarded for his devout commitment to the Sunnah and his dedication to fundamental Islamic principles and practices.

=== Abdul Qadir Gilani ===
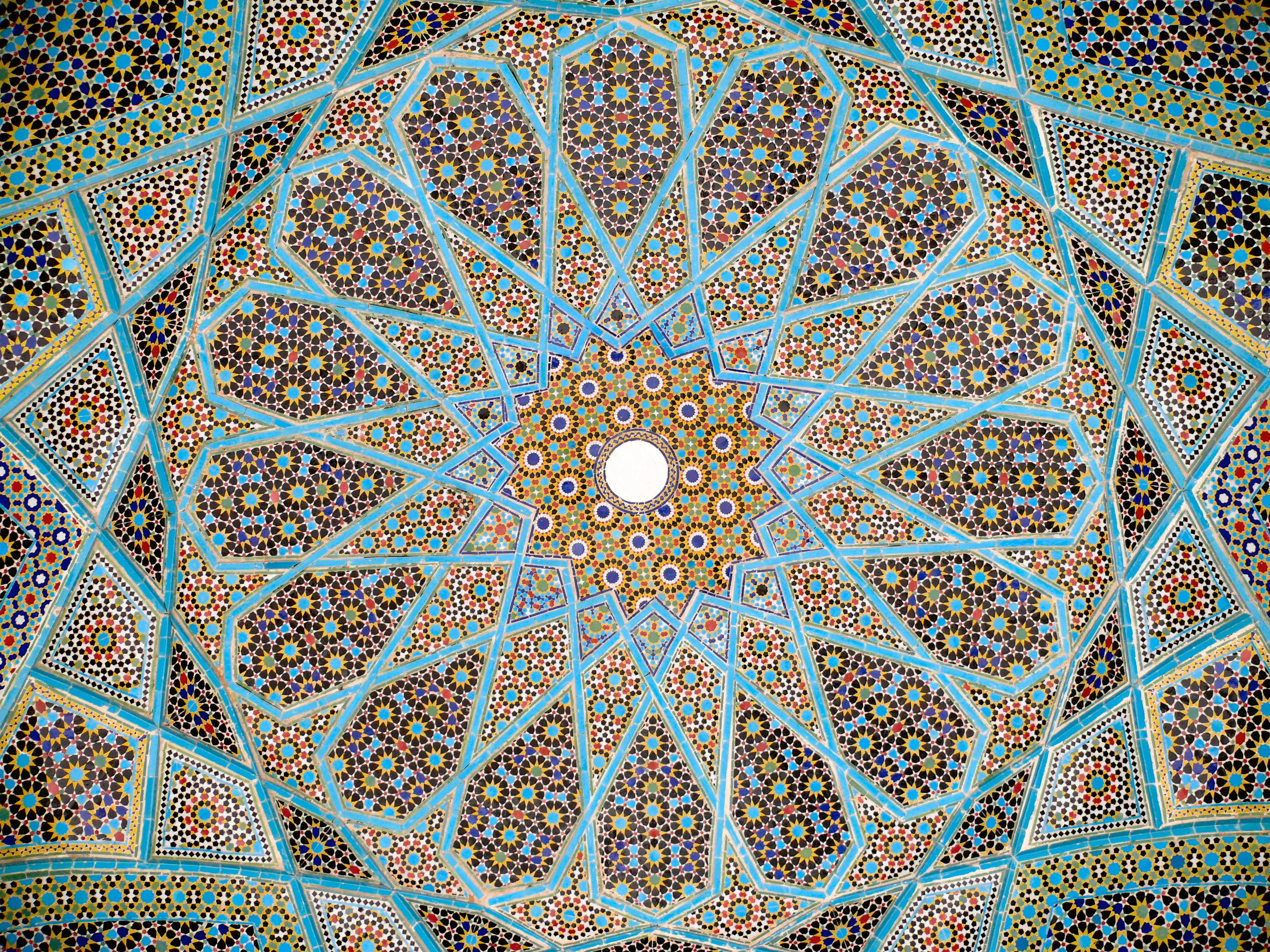
Geometric tiling on the underside of the dome of Hafiz Shirazi's tomb in Shiraz

Abdul Qadir Gilani (1077–1166) was a Mesopotamian-born Hanbali jurist and prominent Sufi scholar based in Baghdad, with Persian roots. Gilani spent his early life in Na'if, a town just East of Baghdad, also the town of his birth. There, he pursued the study of Hanbali law. In Baghdad, he took admission to Madrassa Nizamiya . Abu Saeed Mubarak Makhzoomi gave Gilani lessons in fiqh. He was given lessons about hadith by Abu Bakr ibn Muzaffar. He was given lessons about Tafsir by Abu Muhammad Ja'far, a commentator. His Sufi spiritual instructor was Abu'l-Khair Hammad ibn Muslim al-Dabbas. After completing his education, Gilani left Baghdad. He spent twenty-five years as a reclusive wanderer in the desert regions of Iraq. In 1127, Gilani returned to Baghdad and began to preach to the public. He joined the teaching staff of the school belonging to his own teacher, Abu Saeed Mubarak Makhzoomi, and was popular with students. In the morning he taught hadith and tafsir, and in the afternoon held discourse on the science of the heart and the virtues of the Quran. He is the founder of the Qadiriyya order, of which its eponym is his patronym.

=== Abul Hasan ash-Shadhili ===
Abul Hasan ash-Shadhili (died 1258) was the founder of the Shadhiliyya order, and introduced dhikr jahri (the remembrance of God out loud, as opposed to the silent dhikr). He taught that his followers need not abstain from what Islam has not forbidden, but to be grateful for what God has bestowed upon them, in contrast to the majority of Sufis, who preach to deny oneself and to destroy the ego-self (nafs). The "Order of Patience" (Tariqus-Sabr), Shadhiliyya is formulated to be "Order of Gratitude" (Tariqush-Shukr). Imam Shadhili also gave eighteen valuable hizbs (litanies) to his followers, out of which the notable Hizb al-Bahr is recited worldwide even today.

=== Moinuddin Chishti ===
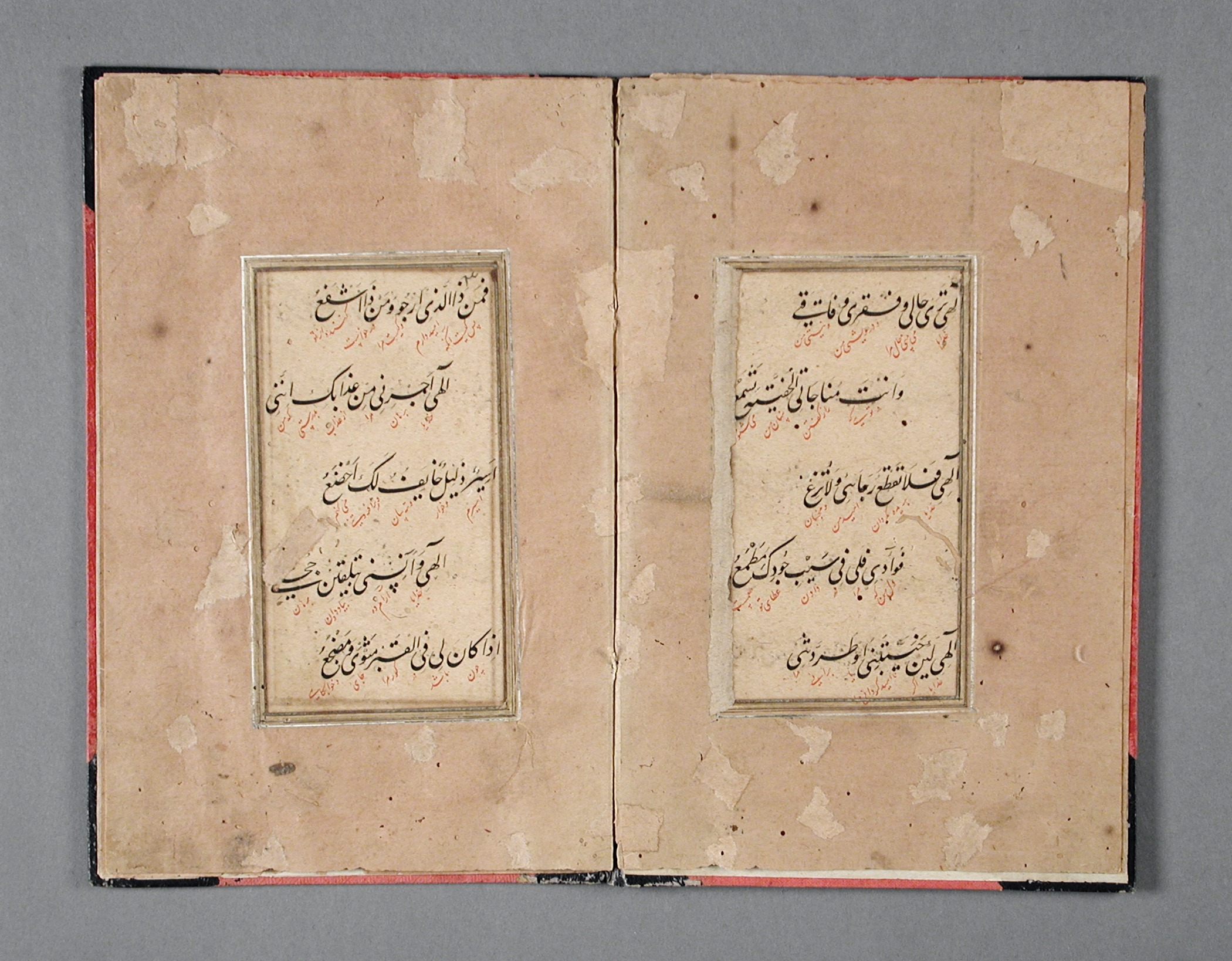
A Mughal-era Sufi prayer book from the Chishti order

Moinuddin Chishti (1141–1236), known as Gharīb Nawāz ("Benefactor of the Poor"), was the most famous Sufi saint of the Chishti Order. Moinuddin Chishti introduced and established the order in the Indian subcontinent. The initial spiritual chain or silsila of the Chishti order in India, comprising Moinuddin Chishti, Bakhtiyar Kaki, Baba Farid, Nizamuddin Auliya (each successive person being the disciple of the previous one), constitutes the great Sufi saints of Indian history. Moinuddin Chishtī turned towards India, reputedly after a dream in which Muhammad blessed him to do so. After a brief stay at Lahore, he reached Ajmer along with Sultan Shahāb-ud-Din Muhammad Ghori, and settled down there. In Ajmer, he attracted a substantial following, acquiring a great deal of respect amongst the residents of the city. Moinuddin Chishtī practised the Sufi Sulh-e-Kul (peace to all) concept to promote understanding between Muslims and non-Muslims.

=== Bahauddin Naqshband ===
Bahauddin Naqshband (1318–1389) was a prominent Sufi master of the 14th century who founded the Naqshbandi Sufi order. Born in the village of Qasr-i Hinduvan near Bukhara, Uzbekistan, he was a descendant of Muhammad. His early life was marked by a deep spiritual inclination. He sought out the guidance of renowned Sufi teachers and quickly demonstrated exceptional talent and understanding. His primary teacher was Mohammad Baba As-Samasi, who initiated him into the spiritual path. His approach to Sufism emphasised inner contemplation, discipline, and a focus on the unseen. He advocated for a balanced lifestyle, combining spiritual practices with worldly responsibilities. His teachings were rooted in the Quran and the Sunnah, and he emphasised the importance of following the example of Muhammad.

The Naqshbandi order became one of the most influential Sufi orders in Islamic history. It spread throughout Central Asia, the Middle East, and eventually to South Asia and the West. The order's emphasis on spiritual discipline, inner work, and social engagement resonated with many seekers.

=== Ahmad Al-Tijani ===
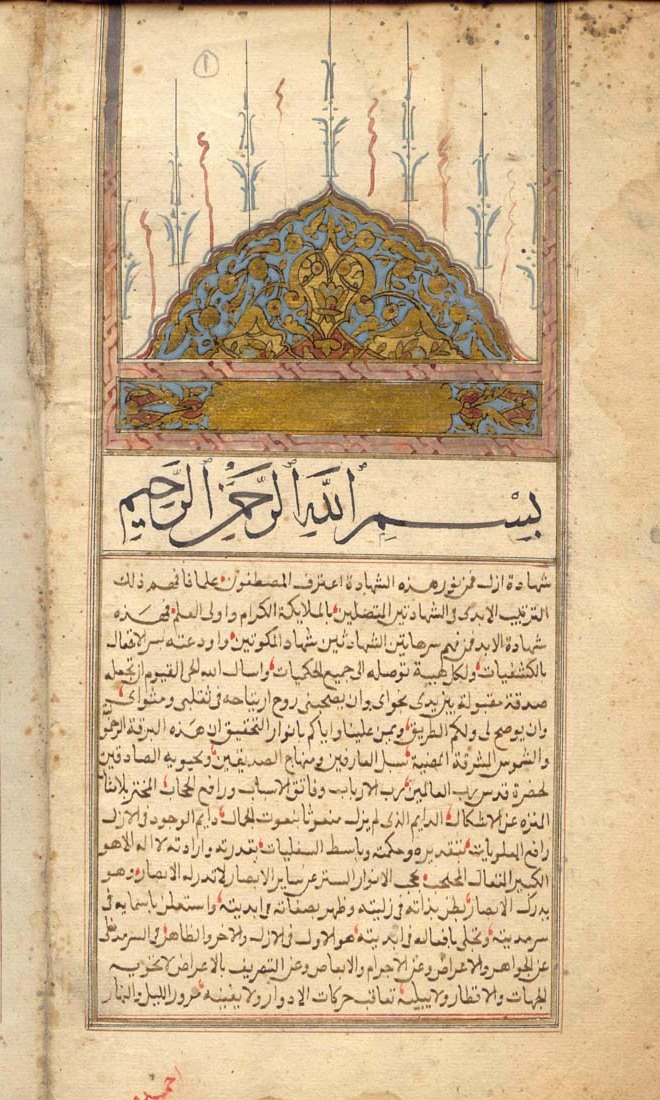
A manuscript of Sufi Islamic theology, Shams al-Ma'arif (The Book of the Sun of Gnosis) was written by the Algerian Sufi master Ahmad al-Buni during the 12th century.

Ahmed Tijani (1737–1815), in Arabic سيدي أحمد التجاني (Sidi Ahmed Tijani), was the founder of the Tijaniyya Sufi order. He was born in a Berber family, in Aïn Madhi, present-day Algeria, and died at the age of 78 in Fez.

=== Al-Ghazālī ===
al-Ghazali (c. 1058 – 1111) was a Persian polymath. He was a prominent Sufi, jurisconsult, legal theoretician, mufti, philosopher, theologian, logician and mystic. He is considered to be the 11th century's mujaddid, a renewer of the faith, who appears once every 100 years. Al-Ghazali's works were so highly acclaimed by his contemporaries that he was awarded the honorific title "Proof of Islam". He was a prominent mujtahid in the Shafi'i school of law. His magnum opus was Iḥyā’ ‘ulūm ad-dīn ("The Revival of the Religious Sciences"). His works include Tahāfut al-Falāsifa ("Incoherence of the Philosophers"), a landmark in the history of philosophy.

=== Badi' al-Din ===
Badi' al-Din was a Sufi saint who founded the Madariyya Silsila and order. He was also known by the title Qutb-ul-Madar.

He hailed originally from Syria, and was born in Aleppo to a Syed Hussaini family. His teacher was Bayazid Tayfur al-Bistami. After making a pilgrimage to Medina, he journeyed to India to spread the Islamic faith, where he founded the Madariyya order. His tomb is at Makanpur.

=== Ibn Arabi ===
Ibn 'Arabi (or Ibn al-'Arabi) (AH 561 – AH 638; 1165–1240) was one of the most influential Sufis, revered for his profound spiritual insight, refined taste, and deep knowledge of God. Over the centuries, he has been honoured with the title "The Grand Master" (Arabic: الشيخ الأكبر). Ibn Arabi founded the Sufi order known as "Al Akbariyya" (Arabic: الأكبرية), which remains active to this day. The order, based in Cairo, continues to spread his teachings and principles through its own sheikh. Ibn Arabi's writings, especially al-Futuhat al-Makkiyya and Fusus al-Hikam, have been studied within all Sufi orders as the clearest expression of tawhid (Divine Unity), though because of their recondite nature they were often only given to initiates. His teachings later became known as the school of wahdat al-wujud (the Oneness of Being). He himself considered his writings to have been divinely inspired. As he expressed the way to one of his close disciples, his legacy is that "you should never ever abandon your servant-hood (ubudiyya), and that there may never be in your soul a longing for any existing thing".

=== Mansur Al-Hallaj ===
Mansur Al-Hallaj (died 922) is renowned for his claim, Ana-l-Haqq ("I am the Truth"), his ecstatic Sufism and state-trial. His refusal to recant this utterance, which was regarded as apostasy, led to a long trial. He was imprisoned for 11 years in a Baghdad prison, before being tortured and publicly beheaded on 26 March 922. He is still revered by Sufis for his willingness to embrace torture and death rather than recant. It is said that during his prayers, he would say "O Lord! You are the guide of those who are passing through the Valley of Bewilderment. If I am a heretic, enlarge my heresy".

=== Yusuf Abu al-Haggag ===
Yusuf Abu al-Haggag (c. 1150 – c. 1245) was a Sufi scholar and sheikh preaching principally in Luxor, Egypt. He devoted himself to knowledge, asceticism and worship. In his pursuits, he earned the nickname "Father of the Pilgrim". His birthday is celebrated today annually in Luxor, with people convening at the Abu Haggag Mosque.

== Notable Sufi works ==
Among the most popular Sufi works are:

- Al-Ta'arruf li-Madhhab Ahl al-Tasawwuf (The Exploration of the Path of Sufis) by Abu Bakr al-Kalabadhi (d. ca. 380/990), a popular text about which 'Umar al-Suhrawardi (d. 632/1234) is reported to have said: "if it were not for the Ta'arruf, we would know nothing about Sufism".
- Qūt al-Qulūb (Nourishment of the Hearts) by Abu Talib al-Makki (d. 386/996), an encyclopaedic manual of Sufism (Islamic mystical teachings), which would have a significant influence on al-Ghazali's Ihya' 'Ulum al-Din (The Revival of the Religious Sciences).
- Hilyat al-Awliya wa Tabaqat al-Asfiya (The Ornament of God's Friends and Generations of Pure Ones) by Abu Na'im al-Isfahani (d. 430/1038), which is a voluminous collection of biographies of Sufis and other early Muslim religious leaders.
- Al-Risala al-Qushayriyya (The Qushayrian Treatise) by al-Qushayri (d. 465/1072), an indispensable reference book for those who study and specialise in Islamic mysticism. It is considered as one of the most popular Sufi manuals and has served as a primary textbook for many generations of Sufi novices to the present.
- Ihya' 'Ulum al-Din (The Revival of the Sciences of Religion) by al-Ghazali (d. 505/1111). It is widely regarded as one of the most complete compendiums of Muslim thought and practice ever written, and is among the most influential books in the history of Islam. As its title indicates, it is a sustained attempt to put vigour and liveliness back into Muslim religious discourse.
- Al-Ghunya li-Talibi Tariq al-Haqq (Sufficient Provision for Seekers of the Path of the Truth) by 'Abd al-Qadir al-Jilani (d. 561/1166). Translated from Arabic into English for the first time by Muhtar Holland.
- 'Awarif al-Ma'arif (The Gifts of Spiritual Perceptions) by Shihab al-Din 'Umar al-Suhrawardi (d. 632/1234), was one of the more popular Sufi books of his time, and posthumously it became the standard preparatory text book for Sufi novices around the Islamic world.
- Al-Hikam al-'Ata'iyya (The Aphorisms of Ibn 'Ata' Allah) by Ibn 'Ata' Allah al-Sakandari (d. 709/1309), a collection of 261 Sufi aphorisms and proverbs (some counted it 264) containing precise contemplative reflections on man's relations with God, based on the teachings of the Quran and the Sunnah, and deals with issues related to tawhid (Islamic monotheism), ethics, morality and day-to-day conduct.

=== Sufi commentaries on the Qur'an ===
Sufis have also made contributions to the Qur'anic exegetical literature, expounding the inner esoteric meanings of the Qur'an. Among such works are the following:

- Tafsir al-Qu'ran al-'Azim (Interpretation of the Great Qur'an) by Sahl al-Tustari (d. 283/896), the oldest Sufi commentary on the Qur'an.
- Lata'if al-Isharat (Subtleties of the Allusions) by al-Qushayri (d. 465/1072).
- 'Ara'is al-Bayan fi Haqa'iq aI-Qur'an (The Brides of Explication Concerning the Hidden Realities of the Qur'an) by Ruzbihan al-Baqli (d. 606/1209).
- Al-Ta'wilat al-Najmiyya (Starry Interpretations) by Najm al-Din Kubra (d. 618/1221). This is a jointly-authored work, started by Najm al-Din Kubra, followed by his student Najm al-Din Razi (d. 654/1256) and finished by 'Alā' al-Dawla al-Simnani (d. 736/1336).
- Ghara'ib al-Qur'an wa Ragha'ib al-Furqan (Wonders of the Qur'an and Desiderata of the Criterion) by Nizam al-Din al-Nisaburi (d. ca. 728/1328).
- Anwar al-Qur'an wa Asrar al-Furqan (Lights of the Qur'an and Secrets of the Criterion) by Mulla 'Ali al-Qari (d. 1014/1606).
- Tafsir Ruh al-Bayan (The Spirit of Explanation in the Commentary on the Qur'an) by Isma'il Haqqi al-Brusawi/Bursevi (d. 1137/1725). He started this voluminous Qur'anic commentary and completed it in twenty-three years.
- Al-Bahr al-Madeed fi Tafsir al-Qur'an al-Majeed (The Vast Sea in the Interpretation of the Glorious Qur'an) by Ahmad ibn 'Ajiba (d. 1224/1809).

== Reception ==
=== Persecution of Sufi Muslims ===
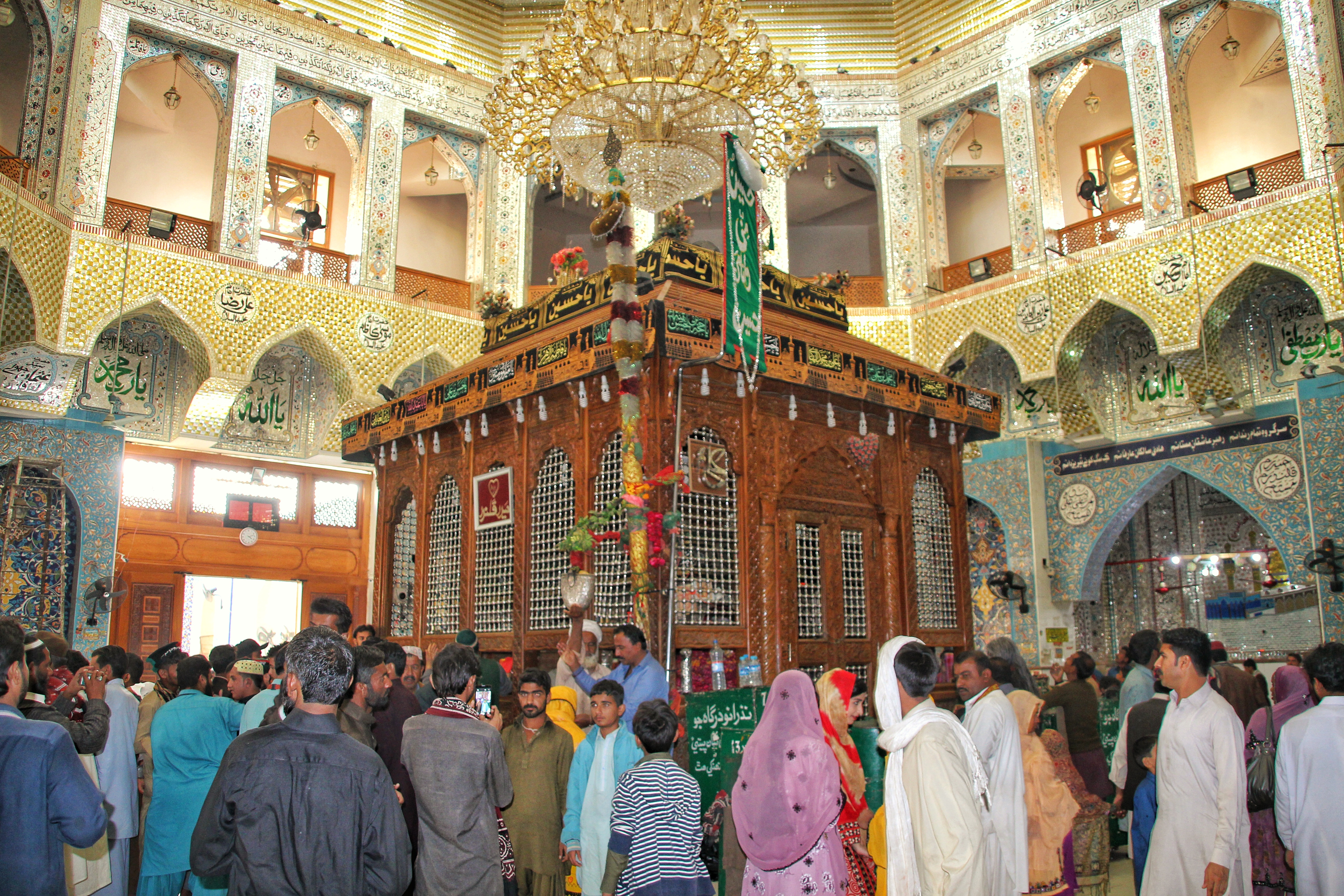
Muslim pilgrims gathered around the Ḍarīẖ covering the grave (qabr) of the 13th-century Sufi saint Lal Shahbaz Qalandar (shrine located in Sehwan Sharif, Pakistan); on 16 February 2017, ISIS claimed responsibility for a suicide attack on the shrine, which resulted in the deaths of 90 people.

The persecution of Sufism and Sufi Muslims over the course of centuries has included acts of religious discrimination, persecution and violence, such as the destruction of Sufi shrines, tombs, and mosques, suppression of Sufi orders, and discrimination against adherents of Sufism in a number of Muslim-majority countries. The Republic of Turkey banned all Sufi orders and abolished their institutions in 1925, after Sufis opposed the new secular order. The Islamic Republic of Iran has harassed Shia Sufis, reportedly for their lack of support for the government doctrine of "governance of the jurist" (i.e., that the supreme Shiite jurist should be the nation's political leader).

In most other Muslim-majority countries, attacks on Sufis and especially their shrines have come from adherents of puritanical fundamentalist Islamic movements (Salafism and Wahhabism), who believe that practices such as visitation to and veneration of the tombs of Sufi saints, celebration of the birthdays of Sufi saints, and dhikr ("remembrance" of God) ceremonies are bid‘ah (impure "innovation") and shirk ("polytheistic").

In Egypt, at least 305 people were killed and more than 100 wounded during the November 2017 Islamic terrorist attack on a Sufi mosque located in Sinai; it is considered one of the worst terrorist attacks in the history of modern Egypt. Most of the victims were Sufis.

=== Perception outside Islam ===
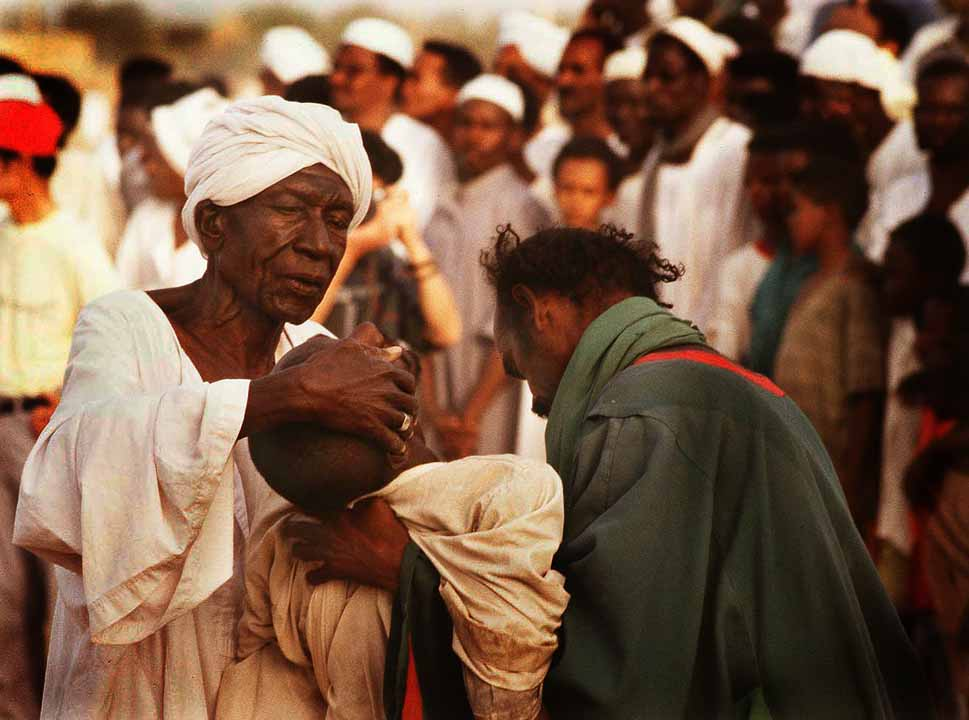
A choreographed Sufi performance on a Friday in Sudan

Sufi mysticism has long exercised a fascination upon the Western world, and especially its Orientalist scholars. In the eighteenth and nineteenth centuries, European orientalists treated Sufism and Islam as distinct subjects, leading to "an over-emphasis on the translation of classical Sufi mystical literature" in the academic study of Sufism at the expense of the lived practices in Islam, as well as a separation of Sufism from its Islamic roots in the development of Sufism as a religious form in the West. Figures like Rumi have become well known in the United States, where Sufism is perceived as a peaceful and apolitical form of Islam. Seyyed Hossein Nasr states that the preceding theories are false according to the point of view of Sufism.

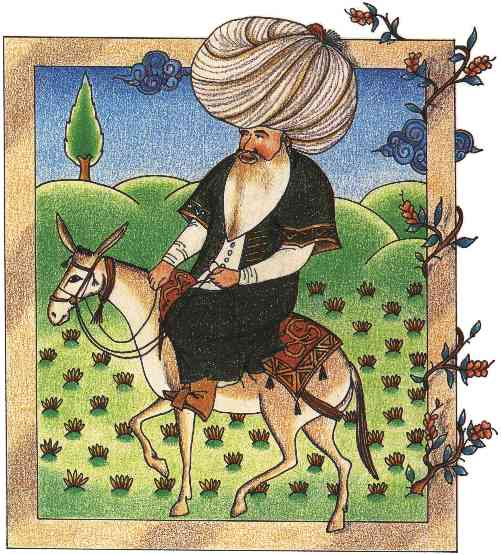
A 17th-century miniature of Nasreddin, a Seljuk satirical figure, currently in the Topkapı Palace Museum Library

The Islamic Institute in Mannheim, Germany, which works towards the integration of Europe and Muslims, sees Sufism as particularly suited for interreligious dialogue and intercultural harmonisation in democratic and pluralist societies; it has described Sufism as a symbol of tolerance and humanism—nondogmatic, flexible and non-violent. According to Philip Jenkins, a professor at Baylor University, "the Sufis are much more than tactical allies for the West: they are, potentially, the greatest hope for pluralism and democracy within Muslim nations." Likewise, several governments and organisations have advocated the promotion of Sufism as a means of combating intolerant and violent strains of Islam. For example, the Chinese and Russian governments openly favour Sufism as the best means of protecting against Islamist subversion. The British government, especially following the 7 July 2005 London bombings, has favoured Sufi groups in its battle against Muslim extremist currents. The influential RAND Corporation, an American think-tank, issued a major report titled "Building Moderate Muslim Networks", which urged the US government to form links with and bolster Muslim groups that opposed Islamist extremism. The report stressed the Sufi role as moderate traditionalists open to change, and thus as allies against violence. News organisations such as the BBC, Economist and Boston Globe have also seen Sufism as a means to deal with violent Muslim extremists.

Idries Shah states that Sufism is universal in nature, its roots predating the rise of Islam and Christianity. He quotes Suhrawardi as saying that "this (Sufism) was a form of wisdom known to and practised by a succession of sages including the mysterious ancient Hermes of Egypt.", and that Ibn al-Farid "stresses that Sufism lies behind and before systematization; that 'our wine existed before what you call the grape and the vine' (the school and the system)..." Shah's views have however been rejected by modern scholars. Such modern trends of neo-Sufis in Western countries allow non-Muslims to receive "instructions on following the Sufi path", not without opposition by Muslims who consider such instruction outside the sphere of Islam.

=== Similarities with Eastern religions ===
Numerous comparisons have been made between Sufism and the mystic components of some Eastern religions.

The tenth-century Persian polymath Al-Biruni in his book Tahaqeeq Ma Lilhind Min Makulat Makulat Fi Aliaqbal Am Marzula (Critical Study of Indian Speech: Rationally Acceptable or Rejected) discusses the similarity of some Sufism concepts with aspects of Hinduism, such as: Atma with ruh, tanasukh with reincarnation, Mokhsha with Fanafillah, Ittihad with Nirvana: union between Paramatma in Jivatma, Avatar or Incarnation with Hulul, Vedanta with Wahdatul Ujud, Mujahadah with Sadhana.

Other scholars have likewise compared the Sufi concept of Waḥdat al-Wujūd to Advaita Vedanta, Fanaa to Samadhi, Muraqaba to Dhyana, and tariqa to the Noble Eightfold Path.

The ninth-century Iranian mystic Bayazid Bostami is alleged to have imported certain concepts from Hindusim into his version of Sufism under the conceptual umbrella of baqaa, meaning perfection. Ibn al-Arabi and Mansur al-Hallaj both referred to Muhammad as having attained perfection and titled him as Al-Insān al-Kāmil. Inayat Khan believed that the God worshipped by Sufis is not specific to any particular religion or creed, but is the same God worshipped by people of all beliefs. This God is not limited by any name, whether it be Allah, God, Gott, Dieu, Khuda, Brahma, or Bhagwan.

Buddhist stories also circulated in Sufi circles, one of them being a story about blind men trying to describe an elephant.

=== Influence on Judaism ===
There is evidence that Sufism influenced the development of some schools of Jewish philosophy and ethics. In the first writing of this kind, we see Kitab al-Hidayah ila Fara'iḍ al-Ḳulub, Duties of the Heart, of Bahya ibn Paquda. This book was translated by Judah ibn Tibbon into Hebrew under the title Chovot HaLevavot.

The precepts prescribed by the Torah number 613 only; those dictated by the intellect are innumerable.

— Kremer, Alfred Von. 1868. "Notice sur Sha‘rani". Journal Asiatique 11 (6): 258.

In the ethical writings of the Sufis Al-Kusajri and Al-Harawi there are sections which treat of the same subjects as those treated in the Chovot ha-Lebabot and which bear the same titles: e.g., "Bab al-Tawakkul"; "Bab al-Taubah"; "Bab al-Muḥasabah"; "Bab al-Tawaḍu'"; "Bab al-Zuhd". In the ninth gate, Baḥya directly quotes sayings of the Sufis, whom he calls Perushim. However, the author of the Chovot HaLevavot did not go so far as to approve of the asceticism of the Sufis, although he showed a marked predilection for their ethical principles.

Abraham Maimonides, the son of the Jewish philosopher Maimonides, believed that Sufi practices and doctrines continue the tradition of the biblical prophets.

Abraham Maimonides' principal work was originally composed in Judeo-Arabic and entitled "כתאב כפאיה אלעאבדין" Kitāb Kifāyah al-'Ābidīn (A Comprehensive Guide for the Servants of God). From the extant surviving portion it is conjectured that the treatise was three times as long as his father's Guide for the Perplexed. In the book, he evidences a great appreciation for, and affinity to, Sufism. Followers of his path continued to foster a Jewish-Sufi form of pietism for at least a century, and he is rightly considered the founder of this pietistic school, which was centred in Egypt.

The followers of this path, which they called Hasidism (not to be confused with the [later] Jewish Hasidic movement) or Sufism (Tasawwuf), practised spiritual retreats, solitude, fasting and sleep deprivation. The Jewish Sufis maintained their own brotherhood, guided by a religious leader like a Sufi sheikh.

The Jewish Encyclopedia, in its entry on Sufism, states that the revival of Jewish mysticism in Muslim countries is probably due to the spread of Sufism in the same geographical areas. The entry details many parallels to Sufic concepts found in the writings of prominent Kabbalists during the Golden age of Jewish culture in Spain.

== Culture ==
=== Literature ===
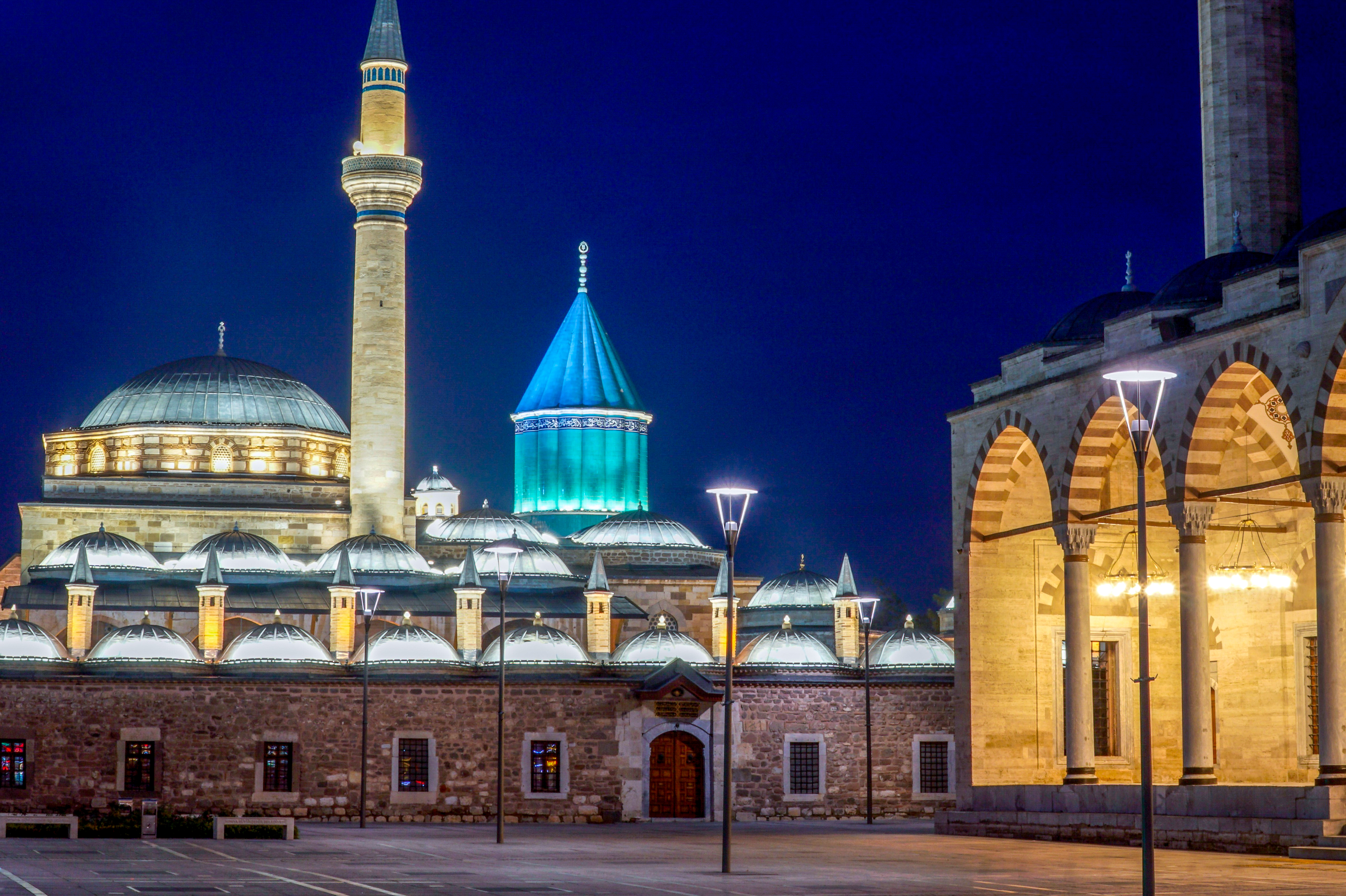
Tomb shrine of Rumi, Konya, Turkey

The 13th century Persian poet Rumi is considered one of the most influential figures of Sufism, as well as one of the greatest poets of all time. He has become one of the most widely read poets in the United States, thanks largely to the interpretative translations published by Coleman Barks. Elif Şafak's novel The Forty Rules of Love is a fictionalised account of Rumi's encounter with the Persian dervish Shams Tabrizi.

Muhammad Iqbal, one of the greatest Urdu poets, has discussed Sufism, philosophy and Islam in his English work The Reconstruction of Religious Thought in Islam.

=== Sama ===
Sama is regarded as an important element in different Sufi orders. In South Asia, it is affiliated mostly with Chishti Order. It develops into a distinct art form, especially during the reign of Khwaja Amir Khusrau and his contemporary Sufi masters, such as Khwaja Nizamuddin Auliya and others. Spiritual experiences were desired by Sufis through Sama, listening to poetry or Islamic mystical verses with the use of different musical instruments, aiming to attain ecstasy in divine love of God and Muhammad.

=== Visual art ===
Many painters and visual artists have explored the Sufi motif through various disciplines. One of the outstanding pieces in the Brooklyn Museum's Islamic gallery has been the museum's associate curator of Islamic art, is a large 19th- or early-20th-century portrayal of the Battle of Karbala painted by Abbas Al-Musavi, which was a violent episode in the disagreement between the Sunni and Shia branches of Islam; during this battle, Husayn ibn Ali, a pious grandson of Muhammad, died and is considered a martyr in Islam.

In July 2016, at International Sufi Festival held in Noida Film City, UP, India, H.E. Abdul Basit who was the High Commissioner of Pakistan to India at that time, while inaugurating the exhibition of Farkhananda Khan ‘Fida’ said, "There is no barrier of words or explanation about the paintings or rather there is a soothing message of brotherhood, peace in Sufism".

== Scientific research ==
A systematic review published in 2023 examined the relationship between Islamic-Sufi spirituality and mental health outcomes, revealing a positive connection between Sufi spirituality and reductions in anxiety and depression among patients.

A study on political Sufism in contemporary Kazakhstan examined patterns of religious continuity and the role of Sufi networks in political mobilisation.

An overview of Sufi studies at American universities indicated that Sufism has become a significant area of scholarly inquiry, with dedicated programmes and research centres focusing on its various aspects.

Recent bibliometric analyses have also mapped the intellectual structure and global trends in Sufi studies.

== Silsila ==
This diagram illustrates the purported spiritual lineage (silsila) of the major Sufi orders, tracing back to Muhammad.

Note: This chart is intended to help illustrate how spiritual masters are connected through the lineage. To keep it less cluttered, the names of intermediate spiritual masters have been omitted. For a detailed lineage of the spiritual orders, please visit their respective pages.

Sufi Order

Muhammad d. 632
Abu Bakr d. 634	Umar d. 644	Uthman d. 656	Ali d. 661
Salman the Persian d. 653	Husayn ibn Ali d. 680	Hasan ibn Ali d. 670	Hasan al Basri d.728
Imam Jafar Sadiq	Habib al-Ajami	Abd al-Wahid ibn Zaid
Ahmad al-Rifa'i (Rifa'i Sufi Order)	Bayazid Bastami	Al-Fudayl ibn 'Iyad
Maruf Karkhi
Ibrahim al-Desuqi (Burhaniyya Sufi Order)	Ahmad al-Badawi (Badawiyyah Sufi Order)
Abu al-Hassan al-Kharaqani	Sari al-Saqati
Abdullah Shattar (Shattariyya Sufi Order)	Ibrahim ibn Adham
Yusuf Hamadani	Junayd Baghdadi
Abdul Khaliq Ghijduwani (Khwajagan Sufi Order)	Zahed Gilani (Zahediyya Sufi Order)	Ahmad Yasawi (Yasawiya Sufi Order)	Abu Bakr al-Shibli	Abu Al-Rudbari	Mumshad Al-Dinawari
Bahauddin Naqshband (Naqshbandi Sufi Order)	Umar Khalwati (Khalwati Sufi Order)	Safi-ad-Din Ardabili (Safaviyya Sufi Order)	Haji Bektash Veli (Bektashi Sufi Order)	Abu Bakr Nassaj Tusi	Abu Ishaq Shami Chishti
Abu Madyan (Madyani Sufi Order)
Khwaja Ahrar (Ahrari Sufi Order)	Hajji Bayram (Bayrami Sufi Order)	Abdul Qadir Gilani (Qadiri Sufi Order)	Ahmad Ghazali	Muinuddin Chishti (Chishti Sufi Order)
Mujaddid Alf Sani (Naqshbandi-Mujaddidi Sufi Order)	Ameer Abul Ula (Naqshbandi-Abul Ulai Sufi Order)	Abd al-Salam ibn Mashish	Abu al-Najib Suhrawardi	Qutbuddin Bakhtiar Kaki
Khâlid-i Shahrazuri (Naqshbandi-Khalidiyya Sufi Order)	Munim Pak (Munemi Sufi Order)	Ahmad al Tijani (Tijani Sufi Order)	Shah Barkatullah Marehrwi (Barkaatiyah Sufi Order)	Al-Shadhili (Shadhili Sufi Order)	Shahab al-Din Suhrawardi (Suhrawardiyya Sufi Order)	Najm al-Din Kubra (Kubrawiya Sufi Order)	Nizamuddin Auliya (Chishti-Nizami Sufi Order)	Alauddin Sabir Kaliyari (Chishti-Sabiri Sufi Order)	Khizr Rumi Qalandar (Chishti-Khizri Sufi Order)
Nazim Al-Haqqani (Naqshbandi Haqqani Sufi Order Sufi Order)	Ahmad Raza Khan (Razviyah Sufi Order)	Muhammad al Wafa (Wafai Sufi Order)	Jalaluddin Rumi (Mevlevi Sufi Order)	Shaikh Badruddin Samarkandi (Firdausiya Sufi Order)	Ashraf Jahangir Semnani (Ashrafi Sufi Order)
Ahmad Zarruq (Zarruqi Sufi Order)
Muhammad al-Arabi al-Darqawi (Darqawiyya Sufi Order)

=== Spiritual chain of major Sufi orders ===
==== Qadiriyya ====
Shaykh Abdul Qadir al-Jilani → Shaykh Abū Saʿīd al-Mukharramī → Shaykh Abū al-Ḥasan al-Qurashī (al-Ḥakkārī) → Shaykh Abū al-Faraj al-Ṭarsūsī → Shaykh ʿAbd al-Wāḥid al-Tamīmī → Shaykh ʿAbd al-ʿAzīz al-Tamīmī → Shaykh Abū Bakr al-Shiblī → Shaykh al-Junayd al-Baghdādī → Shaykh al-Sarī al-Saqaṭī → Shaykh Maʿrūf al-Karkhī → Imam ʿAlī al-Riḍā → Imam Mūsā al-Kāẓim → Imam Jaʿfar al-Ṣādiq → Imam Muḥammad al-Bāqir → Imam Zayn al-ʿĀbidīn → Imam al-Ḥusayn → Imam ʿAlī ibn Abī Ṭālib → Muḥammad

==== Chishti Order ====
Khwaja Muinuddin Chishti → Khwāja ʿUthmān Harvānī → Ḥājjī Sharīf Zindānī → Muḥammad Maudūd Chishtī → Abū Yūsuf Chishtī → Abū Muḥammad ibn Abī Aḥmad → Abū Aḥmad ʿAbdāl Chishtī → Abū Isḥāq Shāmī Chishtī → Mamshād ʿUlw Dīnawarī → Amīnuddīn Abū Hubayrah Baṣrī → Saʿduddīn Huḍhayfah Marʿashī → Ibrāhīm ibn Adham al-Balkhī → Fuḍayl ibn ʿIyāḍ → ʿAbd al-Wāḥid ibn Zayd → al-Ḥasan al-Baṣrī → ʿAlī ibn Abī Ṭālib → Muḥammad

==== Naqshbandi ====
Baha' al-din Naqshband → Sayyid Amīr Kulāl → Muḥammad Bābā Sammāsī → ʿAlī Rāmitanī (Azīzān) → Maḥmūd Anjīr Faghnawī → ʿĀrif Riwgarī → ʿAbd al-Khāliq Ghujduwānī → Abū Yaʿqūb Yūsuf al-Hamadānī → Abū ʿAlī al-Farmadī al-Ṭūsī → Abū al-Ḥasan ʿAlī al-Kharaqānī → Abū Yazīd al-Bisṭāmī → Imām Jaʿfar al-Ṣādiq → Qāsim ibn Muḥammad ibn Abī Bakr → Salmān al-Fārisī → Abū Bakr al-Ṣiddīq → Muḥammad

==== Suhrawardiyya ====
Shihab ad-din Suhrawardi → Abū Najīb ʿAbd al-Qādir Suhrawardī → Khwāja Aḥmad Ghazzālī → Shaykh Abū Bakr Nisāj → Shaykh Abū al-Qāsim Gurgānī → Khwāja Usmān Maghribī → Shaykh Abū ʿAlī Kātib → Shaykh Abū ʿAlī Rudhbārī → Imām Junayd Baghdādī → Sarrī Saqaṭī → Maʿrūf Karkhī → Dāwūd Ṭāʾī → Ḥabīb al-ʿAjamī → al-Ḥasan al-Baṣrī → ʿAlī ibn Abī Ṭālib → Muḥammad

==== Kubrawiya ====
Najm ad-Dīn Kubrā → Shaykh Rūzbahān Baqlī → Khwāja ʿAmmār Yāsir → Shaykh Abū Najīb Suhrawardī → Khwāja Aḥmad Ghazzālī → Shaykh Abū Bakr Nisāj → Shaykh Abū al-Qāsim Gurgānī → Khwāja Usmān Maghribī → Shaykh Abū ʿAlī Kātib → Shaykh Abū ʿAlī Rudhbārī → Imām Junayd Baghdādī → Sarrī Saqaṭī → Maʿrūf Karkhī → Dāwūd Ṭāʾī → Ḥabīb al-ʿAjamī → al-Ḥasan al-Baṣrī → ʿAlī ibn Abī Ṭālib → Muḥammad

==== Shadhili ====
Nūruddīn Abū al-Ḥasan al-Shādhilī → ʿAbd al-Salām ibn Mashīsh → ʿAbd al-Raḥmān al-Madanī → Taqīuddīn al-Ṣūfī → Fakhruddīn → Abū al-Ḥasan ʿAlī → Tājuddīn → Shamsuddīn → Zaynuddīn Maḥmūd al-Qazwīnī → Abū Isḥāq Ibrāhīm al-Baṣrī → Abū al-Qāsim Mirwānī → Abū Muḥammad Saʿīd → Abū Muḥammad Saʿd → Fātiḥ al-Masʿūdī → Saʿīd al-Qirwānī → Abū Muḥammad Jābir → Imām al-Ḥasan → ʿAlī ibn Abī Ṭālib → Muḥammad

==== Rifaʽi ====
Sayyid Aḥmad ar-Rifāʿī → Sayyid Abū al-Ḥasan ʿAlī ar-Rifāʿī → Sayyid Yaḥyā Naqīb → Sayyid Thābit → Sayyid ʿAlī Hāzim Abū al-Fawāris → Sayyid Abū ʿAlī al-Murtaḍā → Sayyid Abū al-Faḍāʾil → Sayyid Abū al-Makārim al-Ḥasan → Sayyid al-Mahdī al-Makkī → Sayyid Muḥammad Abū al-Qāsim → Sayyid Ḥasan Qāsim Abū Mūsā → Sayyid Abū ʿAbdullāh Ḥusayn → Sayyid Aḥmad Ṣāliḥ al-Akbar → Sayyid Mūsā Sānī → Sayyid Ibrāhīm al-Murtaḍā → Imām Mūsā al-Kāẓim → Imām Jaʿfar al-Ṣādiq → Imām Muḥammad al-Bāqir → Imām Zayn al-ʿĀbidīn → Imām al-Ḥusayn → ʿAlī ibn Abī Ṭālib → Muḥammad
