= Sufism in Sindh =

Sufi tradition in Sindh

Sufism in Sindh covers the tradition of Sufism in Sindh, which is reputed to be an area of mystics. Sindh is famous for the enormous number of saints and mystics who lived there and preached peace and brotherhood. According to popular legend, 125,000 of them are buried on Makli Hill near Thatta. There is an abundance of Sufi literature produced in Sindh throughout history.

== History ==
=== Early period ===
Abdullah Shah Ghazi was a Muslim mystic and one of the earliest Sufis in Sindh who came from Arabia. His father, Muhammad al-Nafs al-Zakiyya, was a descendant of the Islamic prophet Muhammad through his daughter Fatimah.

The mystic Husain ibn Mansur al Hallaj, who is credited with the utterance Anal Haqq ("I am The Creative Truth"), reached Sindh in 905, proceeding from Gujarat. He travelled extensively throughout Sindh and discussed theological matters with local sages. He inspired many poets and musicians in the region. Sachal Sarmast was one of the greatest admirers of Mansur Hallaj and pays homage to him in his poetry frequently.

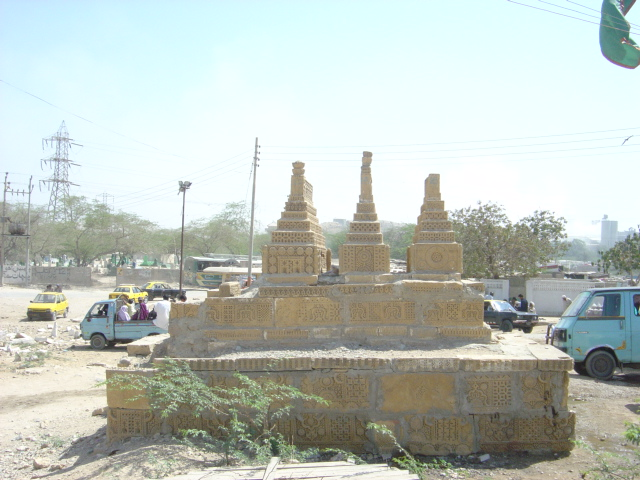
Gravemarkers of the Sufi saint, Pir Mangho.

In 12th Century, a new wave of Sufi Mystics came to South Asia, these included Mu'in al-Din Chishti who brought the Chishtiyya order to South Asia, Lal Shahbaz Qalandar, a Sufi saint from Sindh itself and founder of the Qalandariyya order, Baha-ud-din Zakariya, a Sunni Muslim scholar saint and poet who established the Suhrawardiyya order of Baghdad in medieval South Asia, Baba Farid, a mystic, poet and preacher and Jalaluddin Surkh-Posh Bukhari.

Bahauddin Zakariya, Lal Shahbaz Qalandar, Baba Farid and Syed Jalalauddin Bukhari, together became known as the legendary Haq Char Yaar, or "Four friends" group. Friendship of these famous Sufi saints who were preaching in different regions of South Asia at that time helped spread Sufism in Sindh.

Sufi Saints like Pir Mangho and Bodla Bahar were disciples of Baba Farid and Lal Shahbaz Qalandar who were greatly inspired by them and continued to spread Sufism in Sindh in 13th Century.

=== Middle period ===
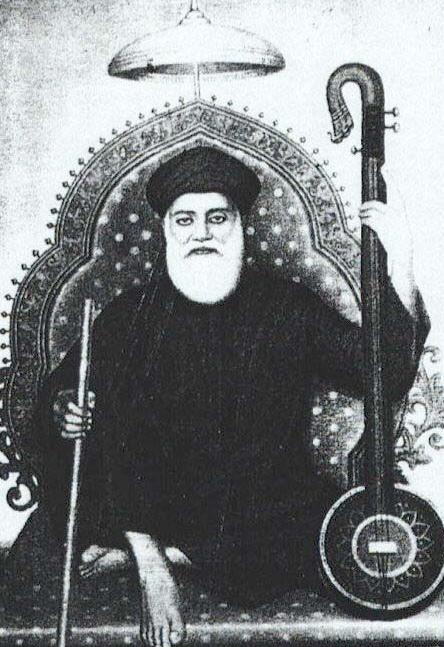
Sachal Sarmast

By 15th Century, Sindh started producing many Sufi saints and poets of its own such as Makhdoom Bilawal and Qazi Qadan of Bukkur who is also known as "The Father of Classical Sindhi Poetry".

Under the Mughal Empire, Sindh saw a large number of Sufi Saints and poets. These included Shah Abdul Karim Bulri, a Sufi Poet who was also the great-great-grandfather of another famous Sufi poet Shah Abdul Latif Bhittai, Shah Inat Rizvi, Bibi Jamal Khatun, a female Sufi saint whose mother was daughter of Qazi Qadan and Shah Inayat Shaheed, another saint of Sindh who was executed on the orders of Mughal Emperor Farrukhsiyar.

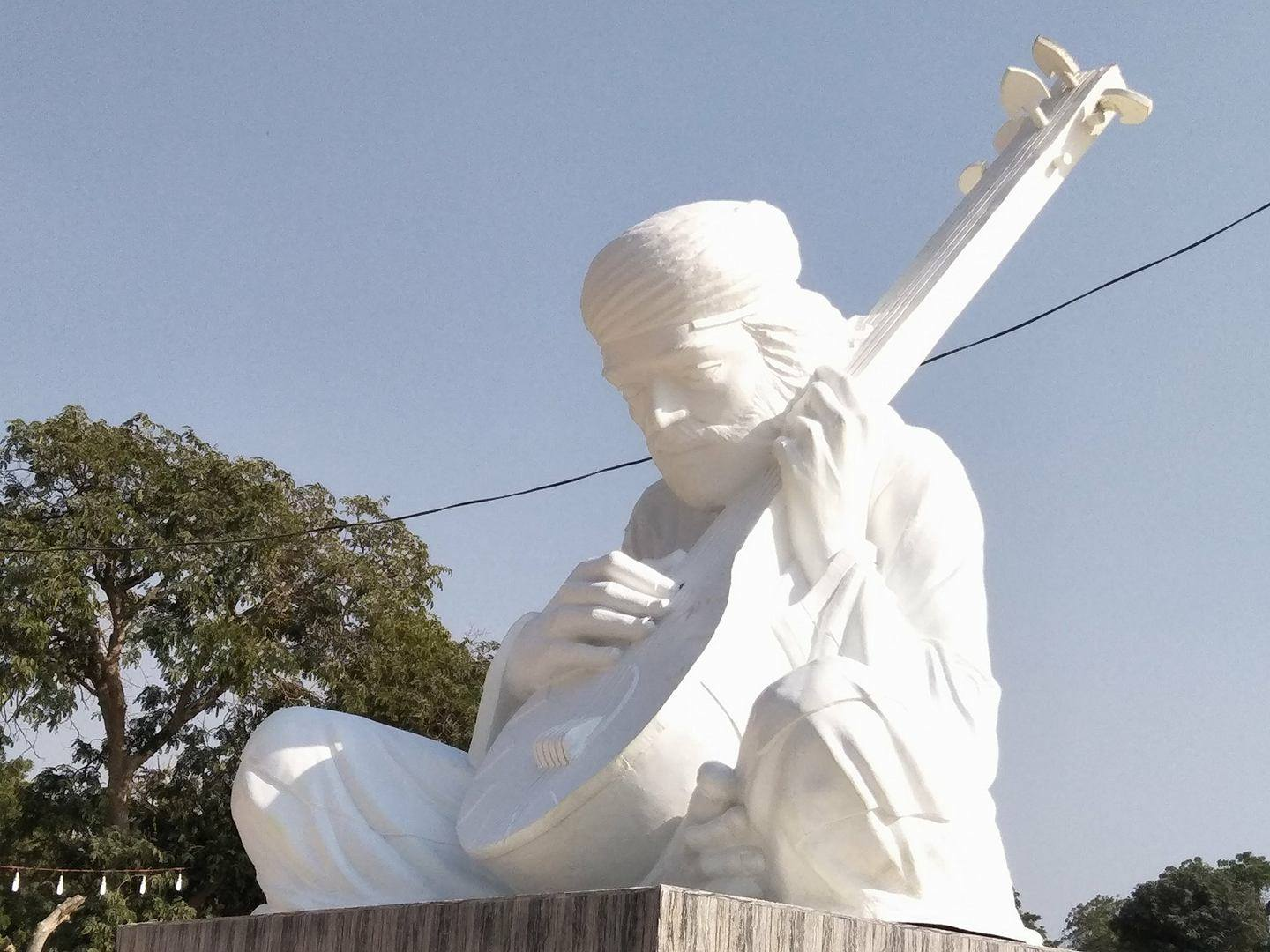
Statue of Shah Abdul Latif Bhittai, A Sufi Saint and National poet of Sindh. in Bhit Shah, Sindh.

By 18th Century, Sufism had reached its high point in Sindh due to the poetry of Sufi Saints like Shah Abdul Latif Bhittai, Khawaja Muhammad Zaman of Luari, Mir Janullah Shah, Rohal Faqir and Sachal Sarmast.

=== Later period ===
By 19th Century, the Mughal Empire started declining and Sindh also saw a decline in Sufi poets and Saints. Some famous Sufi Saints and poets of this era from Sindh were Sufi Siddique Faqir, Faqir Qadir Buksh Bedil and his son Muhammad Mohsin Bekas, Syed Misri Shah, Pir Hadi Hassan Bux Shah Jilani, Sufi Budhal Faqeer, Nadir Ali Shah, Khwaja Abdul Ghaffar Naqshbandi and Mewa Shah.

=== Modern era ===
Sufism has become a primary marker of Sindhi identity for both Muslims and Hindus. Sufi ideology is continued to be practiced by locals even though some terrorists have tried to attack Sufism by attacking modern Sufis like Sayyid Ghulam Hussain Shah Bukhari and shrines like one in Sehwan Sharif which was the site of a suicide bombing in 2017 carried out by the Islamic State.

== Sufi music ==
According to Michel Boivin, music is inseparable from Sufi poetry in Sindh.

The author of the Akbarnamah wrote that the kafi music originated from Sindh. The art of 'musical narration' had received patronisation under the Soomra dynasty of Sindh and was further developed and patronised under the Sammahs.

The most renowned Sindhi genre of poetry is the kafi which, according to Annemarie Schimmel, is accompanied by instruments and is a vehicle of mystical songs. Shah 'Abd al-Latif is seen as the greatest renovator of Sufi music in Sindh.

The philosophy of Persian poets deeply influenced Sindhi Sufistic thought and poetry. During Muslim rule in Sindh, the works of Rumi, Attar, Jami, Khayyam, Saadi and other poetic Persian mystics were keenly studied by both Hindu and Muslim scholars. Sachal was deeply influenced by Attar. Shah Abdul Latif was influenced by Maulana Jalaluddin Rumi.

== Shrines of sufi saints in sindh ==
Shrine of	Era C.E.	Tomb	City	Photo
Abdullah Shah Ghazi	720–773	Clifton	Karachi	
Sayyid Muhammad Al-Makki	1145–1246	Arak Fort, Bukkur	Sukkur	
Syed Muhammad Usman (Lal Shahbaz Qalandar)	1177–1274	Sehwan Sharif	Jamshoro District	
Bodla Bahar	1238–1298	Sehwan Sharif	Jamshoro District	
Pir Mangho	13th century	Gadap Town	Karachi	
Makhdoom Bilawal	1451–1522	Baghban (near Dadu City)	Dadu District	
Shah Abdul Karim Bulri	1536–1623	Bulri	Tando Muhammad Khan District	
Shah Inayat Shaheed	1655–1718	Jhok Shareef	Sujawal Districtl	
Khawaja Muhammad Zaman	1713–1775	Luari Sharif	Badin District	
Shah Abdul Latif Bhittai	1689/1690-1752	Bhit Shah	Matiari District	
Sachal Sarmast	1739–1829	Daraza	Khairpur	
Sufi Siddique Faqir	1756-1848	Ahur	Umerkot	
Qalandar Baba Auliya	1898–1979	Shadman Town	Karachi	
Pir Hadi Hassan Bux Shah Jilani	1846–1900	Duthro Sharif	Sanghar District	
Nadir Ali Shah	1897–1974	Sehwan Sharif	Jamshoro District	

== See also ==
- Sufism
- Sufism in Pakistan
- Syed Sharf Deen Baghdadi
