= Sadiq Shah =

Sindhi Sufi saint (c. 1756–1848)

Sufi Muhammad Siddique Faqir Soomro
- صوفي محمد صادق فقير سومرو
- Title: Faqir Sahib; Badshah

Personal life
- Born: 1170 AH (1756 CE)
- Died: 1265 AH (1848 CE)
- Era: Talpur era
- Region: Sindh
- Notable work(s): Shah Siddique Jo Risalo, Sehreja, Dardnama
- Known for: Sufi poetry

Religious life
- Religion: Islam
- Denomination: Sunni
- Order: Sufi al-Qadiri
- Creed: Sufism

Muslim leader
- Teacher: Sufi Fazalullah Shah Qalandar

Sufi Muhammad Siddique Faqir (Sindhi: صوفي محمد صادق فقير) popularly known as Sadiq Shah was a 19th-century Sindhi Sufi and revolutionary. He was a disciple of Hazrat Fazul-Allah Qalandar of Jhok Sharif.

Sufi Siddique Faqir joins the ranks of major Sindhi poets like Qazi Qadan, Lutfullah Qadri, Shah Karim of Bulri, Mian Shah Inaat of Nasarpur, Shah Abdul Latif Bhittai, and Sachal Sarmast.

== Early life ==
Sufi Muhammad Siddique Faqir also known as Siddique Shah was born in Shawwal 1170 AH (1756 CE) in Umerkot, Sindh. He belonged to the Soomro tribe, specifically the Matto branch, and was a descendant of the Soomra rulers of Sindh. In his youth, he was known for his physical strength, courage, and rebellious nature. Around the age of forty, following the death of his wife, he abandoned his former lifestyle and devoted himself to the spiritual path.

== Spiritual journey ==
Siddique Faqir's grandfather, Faqir Jalauddin, was a disciple of Shah Inayat Shaheed, while his father, Faqir Deen Muhammad, was associated with the spiritual elders of Bulri.

Seeking spiritual guidance, Siddique Faqir travelled to Miranpur, where he became a disciple of Sufi Fazalullah Shah Qalandar Data Pir around 1210 AH (1802 CE). Under his guidance he underwent rigorous spiritual discipline, eventually becoming one of the leading disciples of Dargah Jhok Sharif.

== Poetry and Works ==
Siddique Faqir is regarded as one of the notable classical Sindhi Sufi poets. His poetry is closely associated with the spiritual tradition of Shah Inayat Shaheed and continues to be recited at the annual Urs of Shah Inayat and at numerous Sufi shrines throughout Sindh.

His poetry is preserved in both written and oral traditions. Many of his verses are sung in the traditional style at his own shrine and at Dargah Jhok Sharif. Besides Sindhi, some of his surviving poetry is composed in the Saraiki language.

The poetry of Siddique Faqir has survived through both manuscripts and oral tradition.

=== Works ===
His principal works include:

- Sadiq Shah Jo Risalo
- Dard-Namah
- Raagnamo

== Legacy ==
The shrine of Siddique Faqir in Umerkot remains an important centre of devotion, where an annual Urs is held. His poetry continues to be recited during the Urs of Shah Inayat Shaheed and at various Sufi shrines across Sindh.

== See also ==
- Jhok (Sindh)
- Shah Inayat Shaheed
- Sufism in Sindh
