= Sufi Budhal Faqeer =

Sufi Islamic saint and poet (1865–1939)

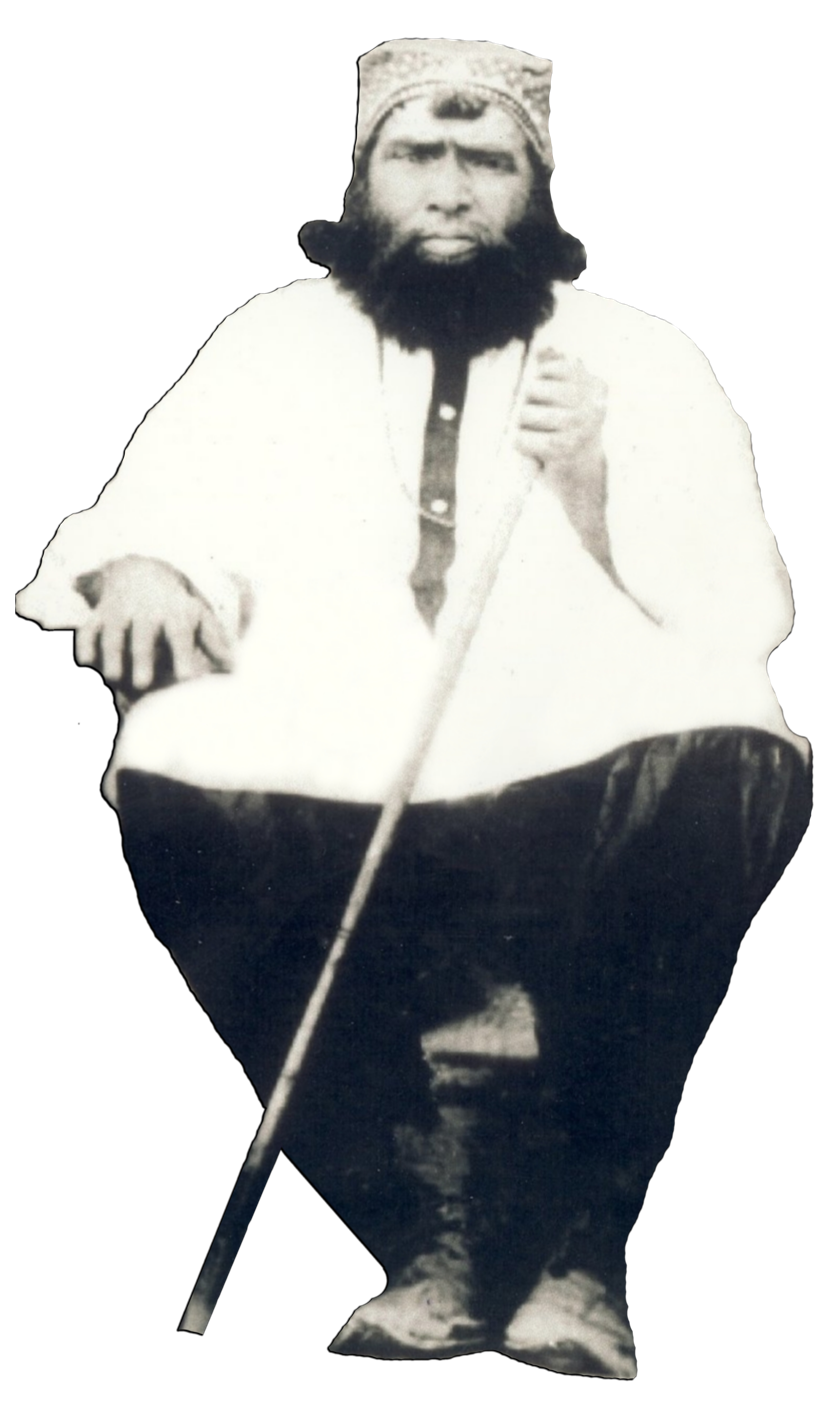
- Sufi Budhal Faqeer

صوفي ٻُڍل فقير
- Born: 1865 CE; Shikarpur, Sindh, British India
- Died: 1939; Shikarpur, Sindh, British India
- Venerated in: Islam,
- Influenced: First Son Abdul Hakeem Faqeer, Abdul Kareem Faqeer, Faqir Mast Muhammad Muqeem Mojooda Gadi Nasheen Sufi Abdul Ghaffar Faqeer Babo Sain
- Tradition or genre: Kafi, poetry, Sufism and Mysticism

Sufi Budhal Faqeer (1865–1939) (Sindhi: صوفي ٻُڍل فقير) was a Sufi saint and poet, and disciple of Hizbullah Shah Rashdi. Faqeer's poetry was collected by his disciples and published in a book called Risalo Budhal Faqeer. Much of what is known about his life is through Sufi tradition, and separating it from historical reality is difficult.

== Birth ==
Sufi Budhal Faqeer was born in 1865 CE in the village of near Shikarpur, Sindh where his father Abdul Wasih. It was the time of British colonisation. It was the time of prosperity for people in farming. Abdul Wasih, calm and humble nature, was childless. He dearly yearned for a child. One day bare-feet Qalandar came at his door and told him, "Need not worry. Very soon you will have a son. Give him the name 'Budhal'". In a year's time, Sufi Budhal Faqeer came in this world.

About the year of his birth, Sufi Budhal Faqeer used to say that when railways tracks in Shikarpur, Sindh were laid in 1883 and English men set up their tents near Zarkhel road, he was at the age of 18. So with this tradition, the year of his birth is considered 1865.

== Childhood ==
Sufi Budhal Faqeer was the only child of parents. As he grew older, he used to go to fields with animal herds away from people at a solitary place. His parents did try to give him a worldly and religious education. But he never felt like studying there. After school time, he would spend would meditate under the shade of tree.

Very soon he was taken off from school. Budhal Faqeer, only son Abdul Wasih, was given domestic animals for herding. He was never interested in this job, so he would retire in jungle near by and animals would be on their own grazing in the fields.

== Spiritual guidance ==
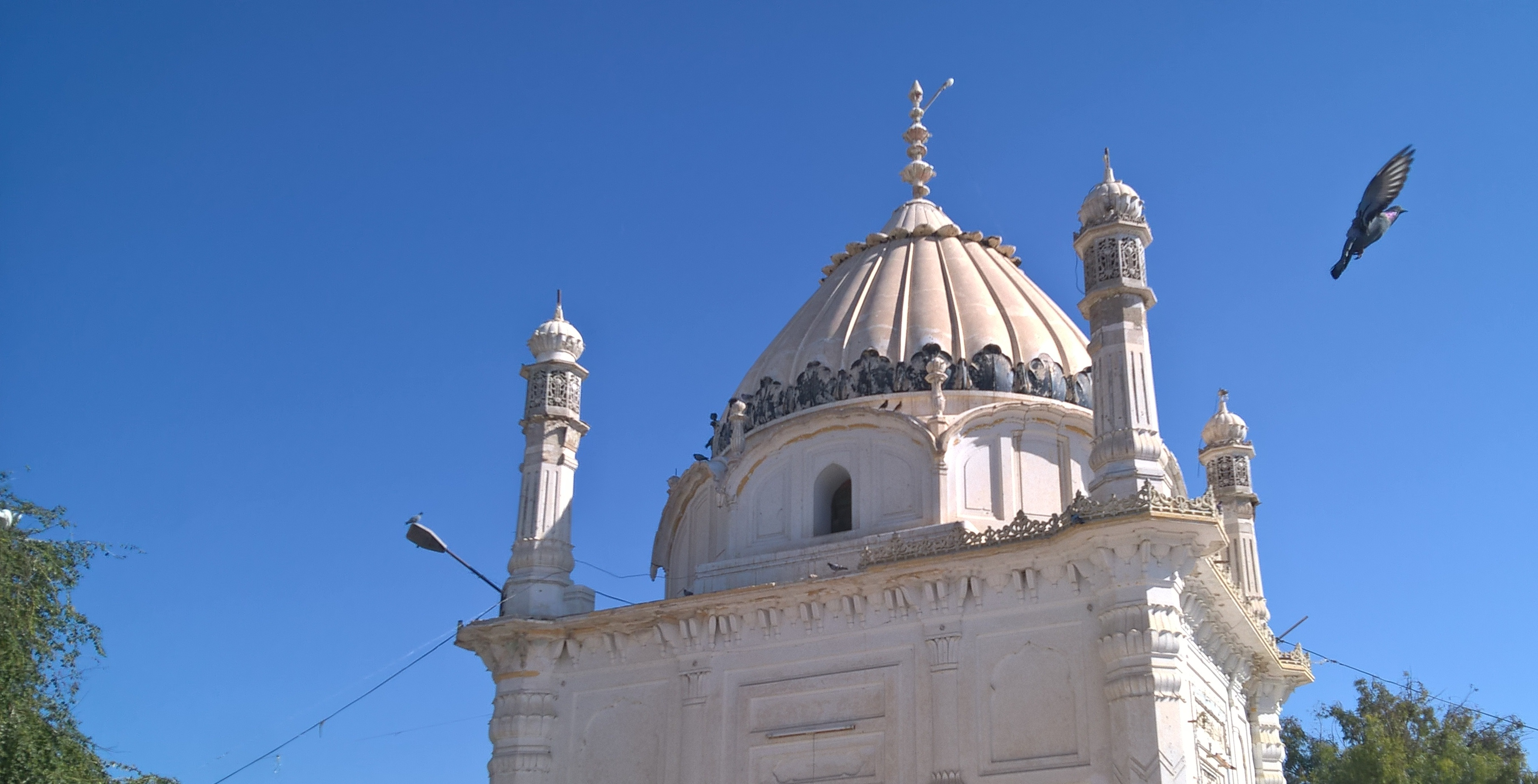

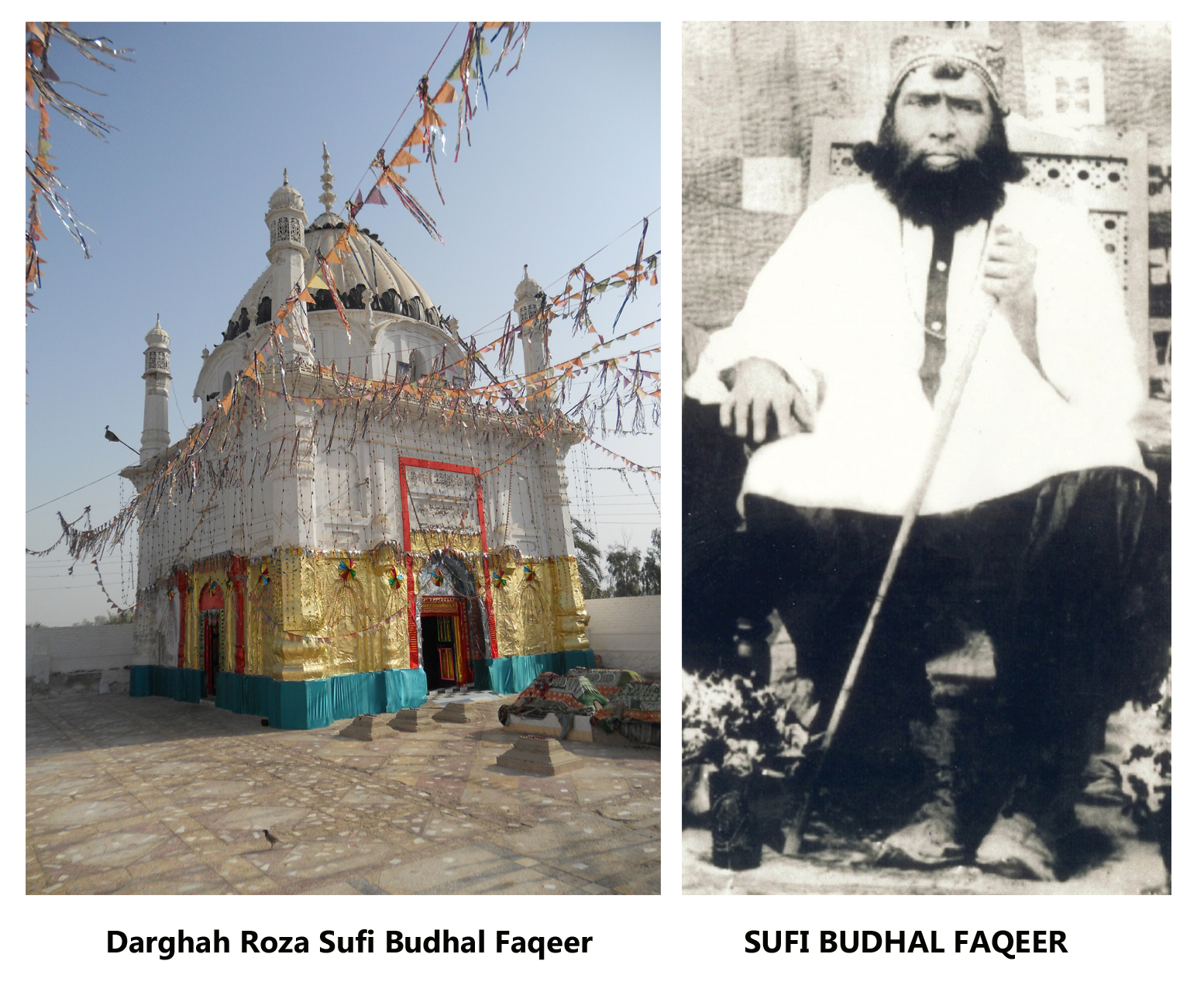

Due to his queer behaviour, he was taken to a great saint, spiritual healer, Hizbullah Shah Rashdi. Having met seen Budhal at his abode in his Pir-Jo-Goth, he said, "Haven't you brought Qadir Bux Bedil of Rohri?". Abdul Wasih said," He is Budhal and he is here for some healing.". Hizbullah Shah said," He is almost ready, only some garnishing is left." He was initiated into Sufi-ul-Qadri school of Islamic Sufism and was given Zikr. After that event, Budhal Faqeer never visited his spiritual guide village, he hardly left his village. He would perform Zikr and meditation most of his time.

== Marriage ==
Sufi Budhal Faqeer never wanted to marry but after the insistence of his father, he married at the age of 26 from his tribe. He had three sons and two daughters. The sons were First Son and First Ghadi Naheen Abdul Hakeem Faqeer, (Second Son) Mast Muhammad Muqeem Faqeer, and (Third Son)Abdul Kareem Faqeer.

== Miracles ==
After his death, Sufi followers began attributing several miracles to him:

- Soon after his birth, he told the midwife where the knife was kept in the room for cutting the umbilical cord.
- The shade of the tree did not use to move from place when he slept under it.
- He used to fly like a bird.
- He never went to Kabbah (Muslim Holy place), but an old lady saw him for seven years performing Hajj.

== Practices and appearance ==
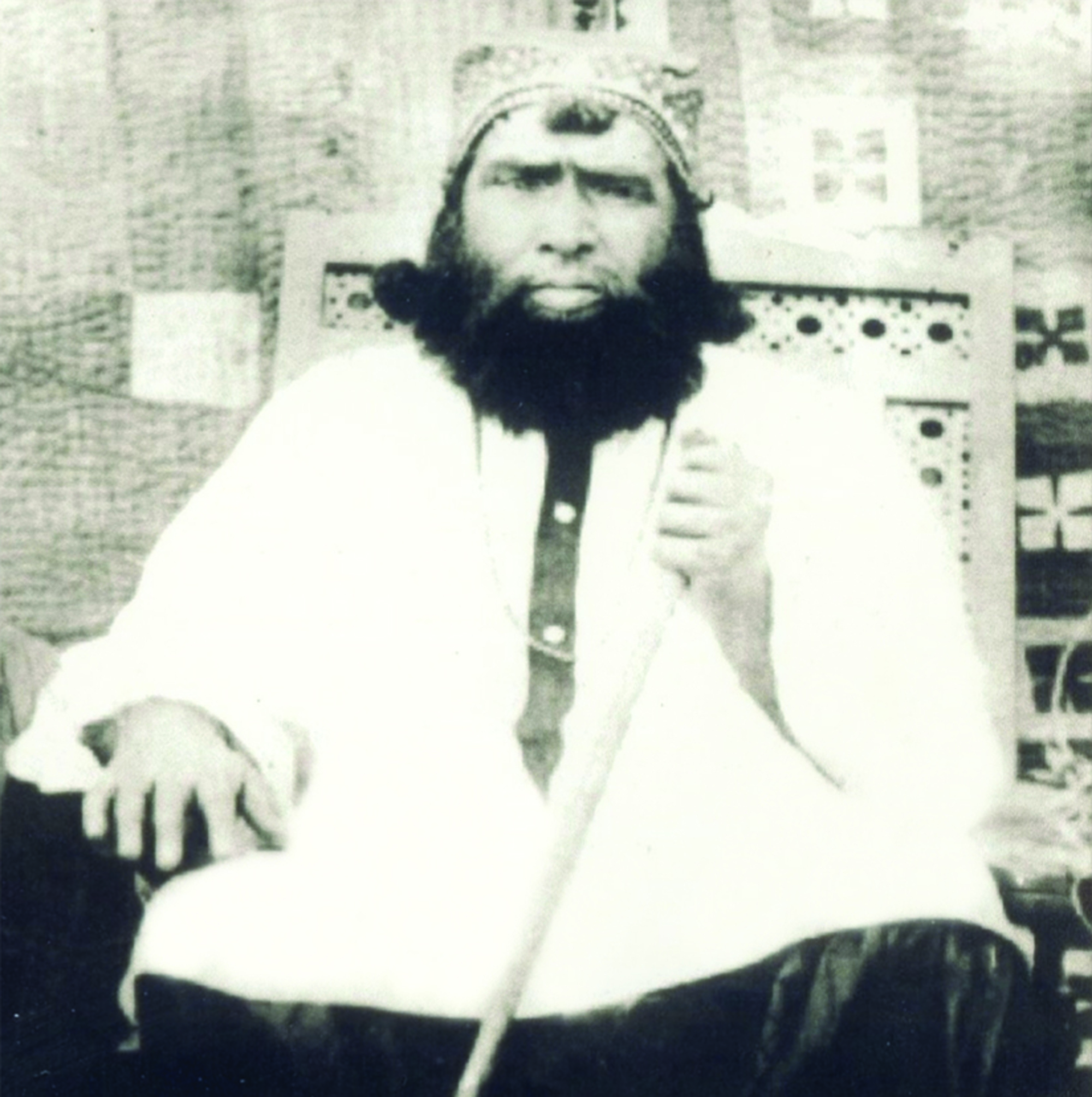
Hazrat Sufi Budhal Faqeer in his old age

Tradition says that he was a person of calm and content nature. He was sympathetic and considerate towards poor people. He would perform the religious duties with utmost dedication. He used to wear long loose shirt and a Sufi cap on his head most of times. He had one physical deformity. His left foot was twisted by birth. For that he would get special leather shoes prepared from cobbler and would wear them.

He used to eat simple food. Churned milk, mustard and spinach were his favourite. His living place used to a hut made of thatched hut. He used to sleep on a bed made of straws and thick bed sheet called "Rilee".

== Poetry ==
Sufi Budhal Faqeer wrote a great deal of poetry. Once he threw a book of his poetry in a well saying that it would deviate the people from sharia. He never wrote a book of poetry. His disciple would write the poetry when he would say them in the state of spiritual ecatsy. Later on all of his remaining poetry was collected and printed by a Total Das in 1941 with the assistance of Abdul Kareem Faqeer, son of Budhal Faqeer.

The poetry of Sufi Budhal Faqeer became famous in his lifetime. Sufi singers Sufi Budhal Faqeer was a celebrated figure and an epitome of intellect, reflection and self-actualization. The mystic poetry and message of the great poet teaches peace, tolerance, equality and lover in the society. Most of his poetry is in Sindhi language and Saraiki.

Sufi Budhal Faqeer was basically a poet of Kafi (classical form of Sufi poetry). He kept the tradition of classical poetry alive in which he sang the stories of Sassi, Umar Marvi, Sorath, and Heer.

The subject of his poetry were related to Sufism, Islam, ethics and humanism. He also said baits, dohas, sai harfis in the lines of great Sufi poets like Shah Abdul Latif Bhittai, Sachal Sarmast, Sibghatullah Shah Rashdi "Asghar" and Qadir Bux Bedil.

His language in the poetry is simple and musical filled with love and pathos for the beloved. With short and pithy lines, he delivers the profound message of merging with Creator. The major part of his poetry is said in the praise of Muhammad.

== Death ==
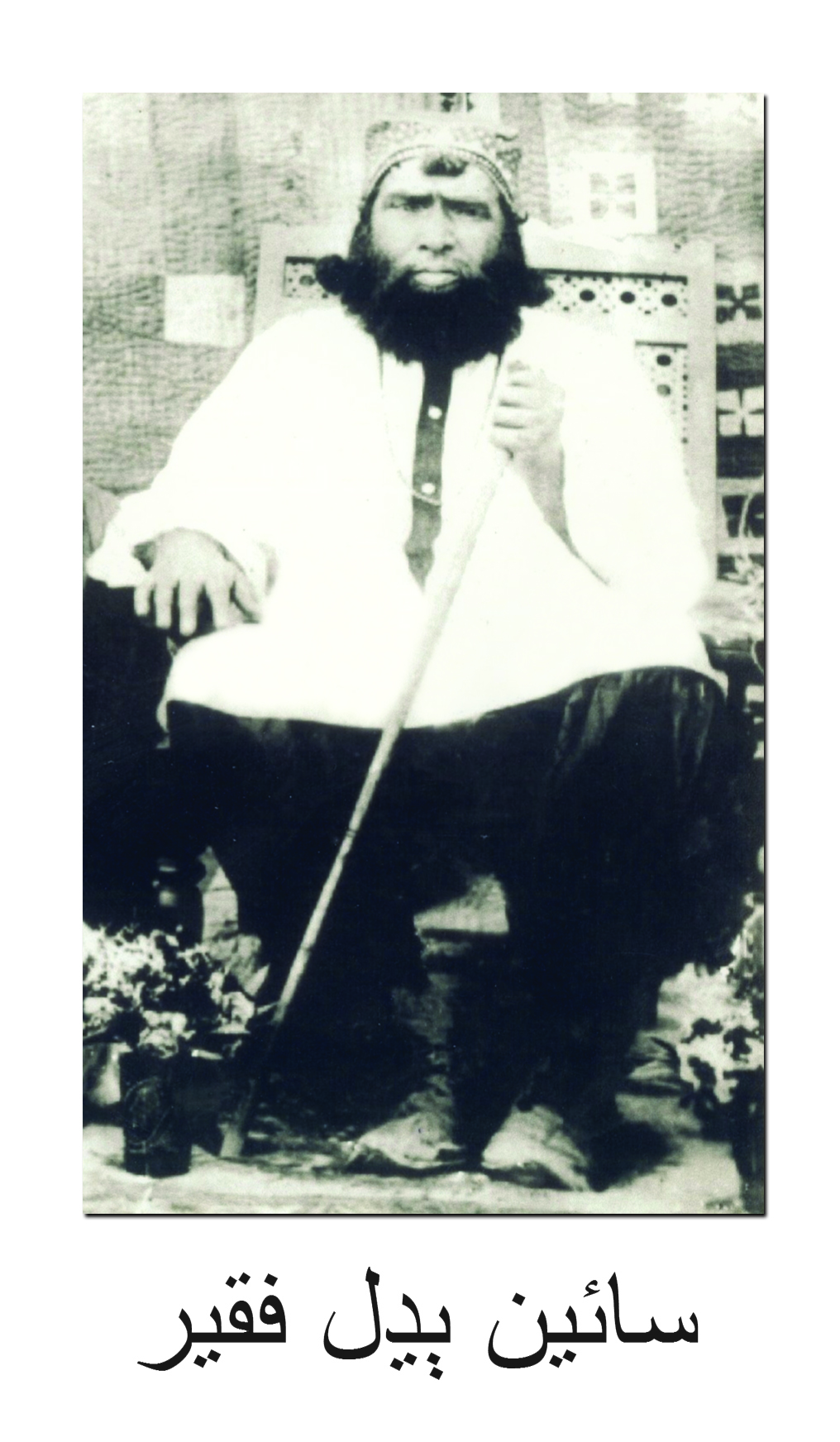

Sufi Budhal Faqeer died at the age of 84 on Thursday 12 October 1939 AD/ 27 Shaban, 1358 Hijri.

The year of his death is derived from an Arabic line "Talib-ul-Mola Faqeer Sahib-e-Tariq-u-Duniya." means " Lover of God, Traveler of Sufi Path and Deserter of world.

Every the annual Urs (fair) is held to commemorate the great Sufi saint and poet of upper Sindh. Thousands of disciples from all over the country attend the Urs and sing his songs with great admiration.

== See also ==
- Sindh
- Sindhi Language
- Sufism
- Sufism in Sindh
- Shah Abdul Latif Bhittai
- Sachal Sarmast
