= Qadir Bux Bedil =

Sindhi writer and Sufi saint (1814–1873

Faqir Qadir Bux Bedil

فقير قادر بخش بيدل
- Born: 1814; Rohri, Sind State, British Raj
- Died: 15 January 1873 (aged 58–59); Rohri, Bombay Presidency, British Raj
- Venerated in: Islam, Hinduism
- Influences: Lal Shahbaz Qalandar, Shah Abdul Latif Bhittai, Sachal Sarmast
- Influenced: Bekas, Nawab Ali Shah Sikayal, Qazi Baba, Baba Nebhraj, Paro Shah, Allah Bux Mast
- Tradition or genre: Poetry, Prose

Faqir Qadir Bux Bedil (Sindhi: فقير قادر بخش بيدل) (1814–1873) better known by his pen name Bedil (one bereft of heart) was a Sufi poet and scholar of great stature. After Shah Abdul Latif Bhittai and Sachal Sarmast, two stars that shone on the firmament of Sindhi poetry and who could measure up to them in excellence were the father and son – Bedil and Bekas. They wrote poetry in Saraiki Sindhi and Persian.

== Name ==
He was originally born "Mian Abdul Qadir Qureshi" but out of respect for Abdul Qadir Jilani, he changed his name to "Qadir Bux Bedil".

== Early life ==
Bedil was born to a very pious family of Rohri. His father, Khalifa Muhammad Mohsin, was a disciple of Sayed Mir Janullah Shah Rizwi, who was a highly venerated great saint of his time and was chief of forty cardinals of Sufi Shah Inayat Shaheed of Jhok Shareef; Thus, Bedil was brought up in such an enlightened environment under the guidance of Mir Sahib.

It is narrated in the book Diwan-e-Bedil by Abdul Hussain Musavi that the midwife came and announced the news of the birth of a child to father who was sitting in the gathering with Sufi Januallah Shah. She said, "You have been blessed with a child but alas, his one foot is physically twisted." Upon hearing this father said," He is not physically handicapped by one foot. In fact, he is the flag of Rohri city." His father's statement proved true many years later. On his birth, he was named Abdul Qadir but he preferred to be called Qadir Bux.

He was a staunch Muslim who molded his life strictly according to Shariah law. He was very simple and frugal in his lifestyle and gave away whatever he received to the needy. He followed the path of Ishq-e-Majazi (platonic love) to attain the heights of Ishq-e-Haqiqi (spiritual love) as dictated by Mystic doctrine. He was a devotee of Lal Shahbaz Qalandar of Sehwan. Although he had a deformity in one foot, yet he undertook long journeys to Sehwan to pay homage to the Saint's Shrine. He went to Jhok Sharif to pay homage to shrine of Sufi Shah Inayat Shaheed and to Daraza, to visit the shrine of Sachal Sarmast.

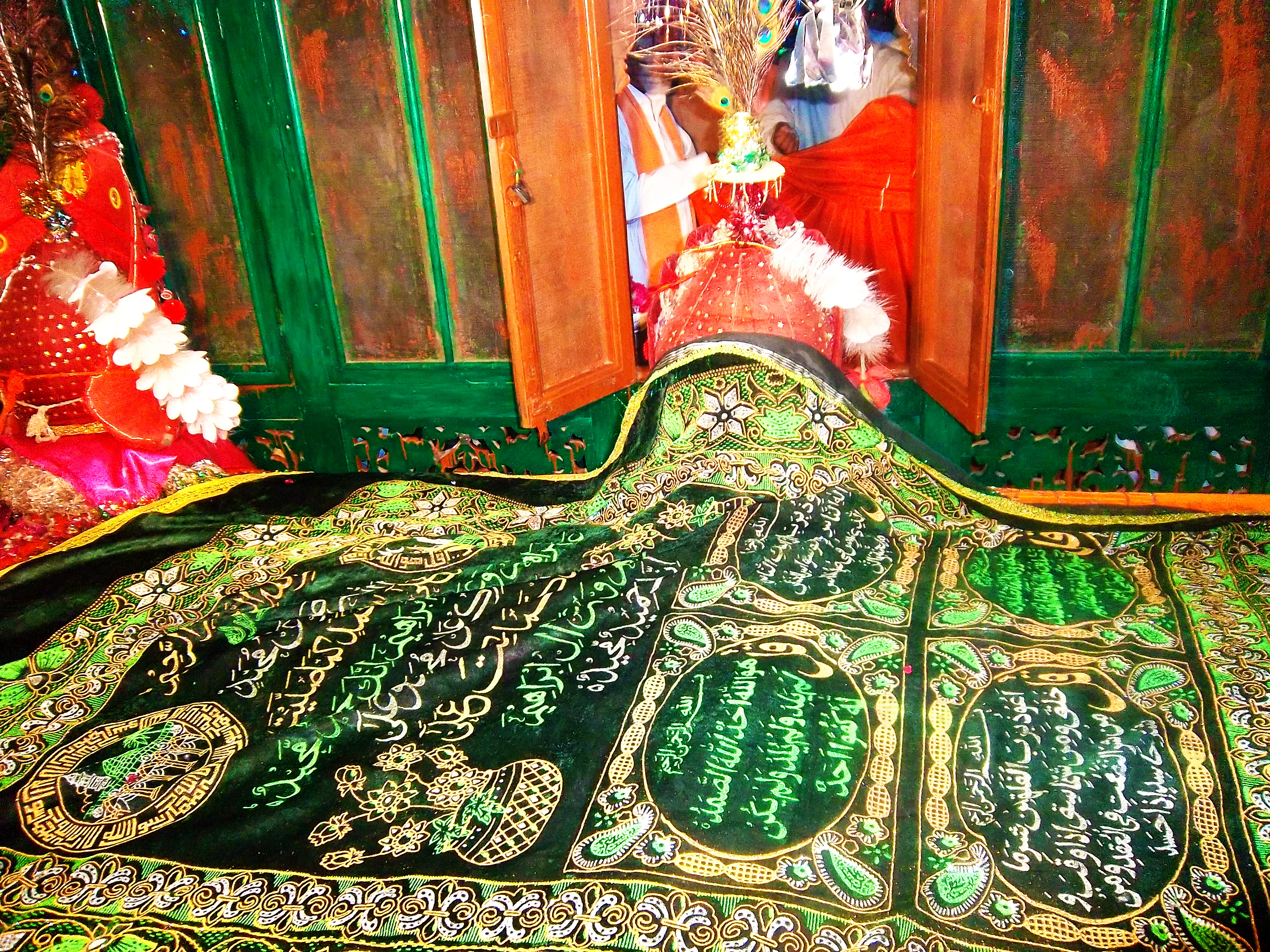
Mazar (Tomb) of Hazrat Qadir Bux Bedil

== Works ==
A rare manuscript of Besarnama The without-head-book by Bedil, a long Mathnavi attributed to Shah Inayat Shaheed reciting during his head's journey to Delhi from Thatta.

Bedil was the most voluminous poet of Sindh, even more so than Shah Latif, with 10 books of poetry to his credit. Most of his poems were written in Persian, Seraiki, Sindhi, Arabic, and Urdu,. His famous Sindhi works were Wahdat Namo (Book of Union) and Surood Namo (Book of Melody). He compiled as many as 23 books on prose and poetry written in Persian, Sindhi, Saraiki, and Urdu: the more known being:

- Masanavi Riyaz-ul-faqr
- Diwan-e-Sulook-ul-Talbin
- Diwan Minhaj-ul-Haqiqat
- Rumuz-ul-Qadri
- Masanavi Nahr-ul-Bahr
- Punj Gunj
- Diwan Musbah-ul-Tariqat
- Wahadat Namo
- Sarood Namo
- Diwan-e-Bedil(Sindhi)
- Masnavi Dilkusha
- Diwan-e-Bedil (Farsi)
- Fe Batn Ahadees
- Taqwiyat-ul-Quloob
- Zahoor Nama
- Qurat-ul-Ain Fe Manaqib-ul-Sibtain
- Insha-e-Qadri
- Tarikhai Wafat
- Khutbat-e-Juma
- Fawaid-e-Manavi
- Kursi Nama
- Ramooz-ul-Arfin
- Diwan-e-Bedil (Farsi)

Scholar Nabi Bux Khan Baloch has termed Fakir Qadir Bux Bedil as the last Sufi saint who wrote on Tasawuf and history of Sindh and taught mysticism through his poetry. Wahadat Namo is a thought-provoking work through which Bedil Fakir has presented the essence of Sufism (mysticism). Bedil was the first scholar who wrote the history of Jhok Sharif and the sacrifice of Sufi Shah Inayat Shaheed of Sindh.

== Poetry ==
Among his poetic compositions, we have his famous elegy, written on the death of Sachal Sarmast immortalising the master and incidentally himself too. Some of the verses from this elegy are:

Wonderful was the magic of love in Daraza, my friend Sachu was there, the intoxicated seeker and the Gnostic. Heavy was the shower of rain, of the yearning of that hero. The pangs of separation were there, visible and invisible. Inherited he was, truly, with the rapture of oneness. Verily he was another Mansur, love itself incarnate. He was Attar the perfumer himself in fervour and sentiment. Commander, he stood in the ranks of those given to love. Bedil haunts the door of the donor for the gift of his ardour. About himself he proclaims in the mood and style of Sachal; "I am what I am. Put on the various garments, and again divert myself of them."

=== Translation of some verses ===
The one whom you seek after,
Is none but your own self.
If you recognise yourself,
Then none other exists.
This and that are same,
Just like voice, sound and echo.

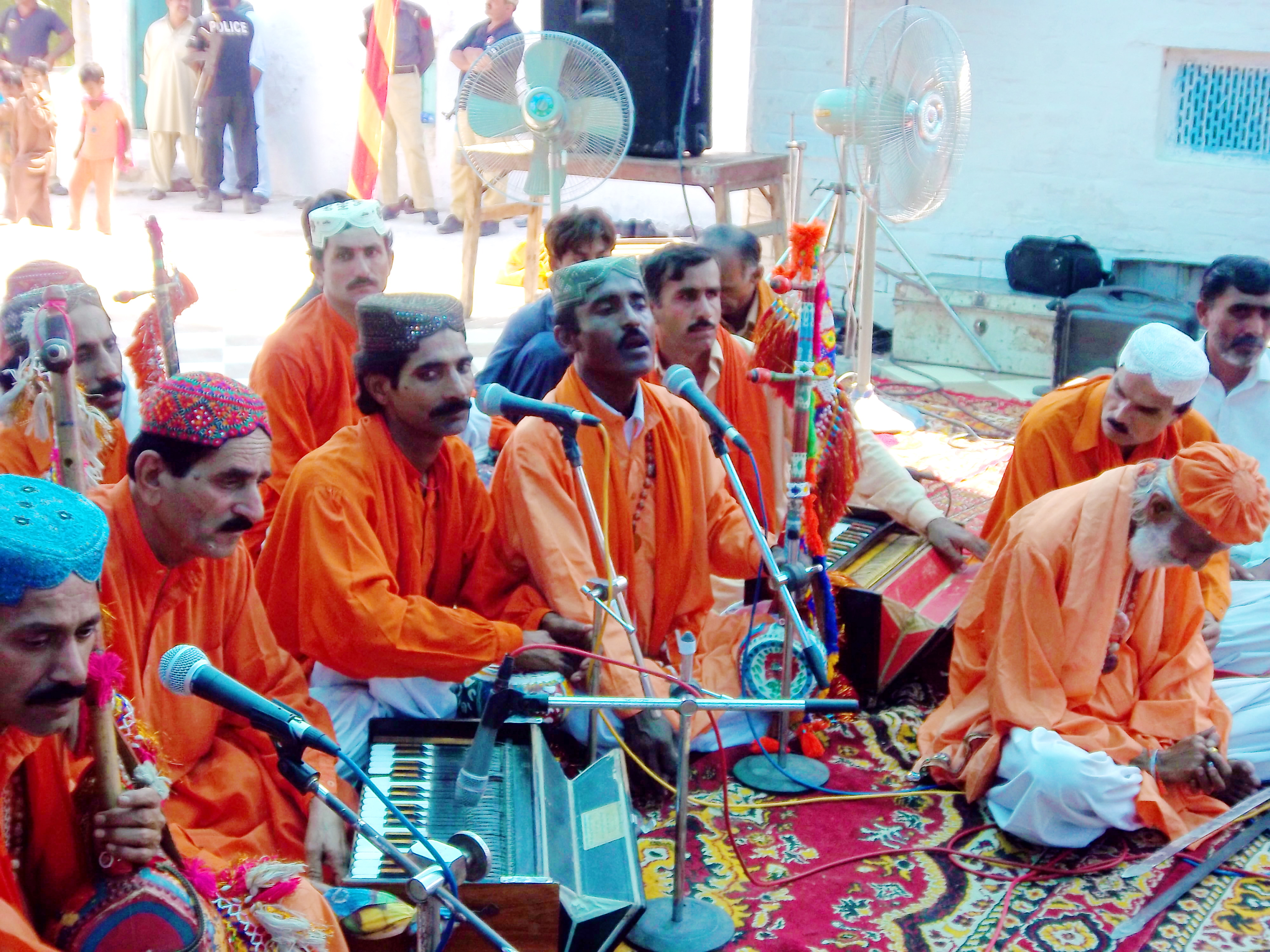
Sufi Singers singing mystical poetry of Hazrat Bedil

Bedil! let it not slip from your hands,
The trade of unitive state,
O' traveler of Sufi path! this thought is profitable. O Bedil leave good and evil,
Go and seek divine love.
Divine love came; reasoning taken away, loads of miseries befell on me,
Heard of pain and separation, likewise agony came in my chest,
Bedil sans love, living in this world is meaningless.

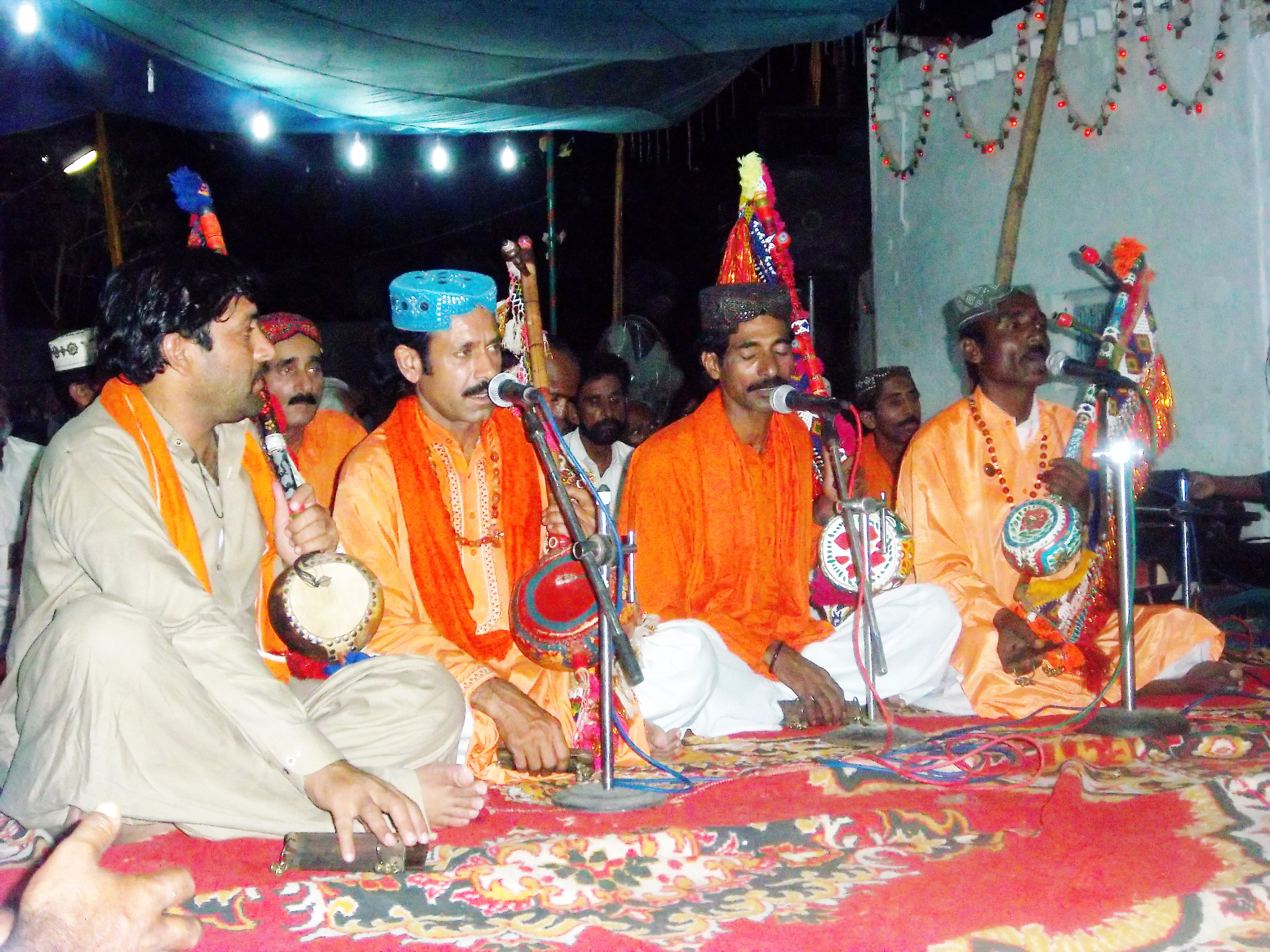
Faqirs of Bedil paying homage on Urs mubarak

Except Him, whatever (I) understood,
O Bedil! love made me forget.
Die before you die,
Then you, O Brave, turn into real Muslim.
Your love is treasure,
Every breath is a special jewel,
Believe it O brave man,
Make the trade of unity,
Achieve the status of self-annihilation,
Eat the fruits of eternity,
With your eyes shall behold every moment,
The exhibition of celestial light.

While standing, sitting, talking or listening,
Keep this remembrance in your body,
Clean the mirror with this (mirror-cleaning) solution.

== Urs ==
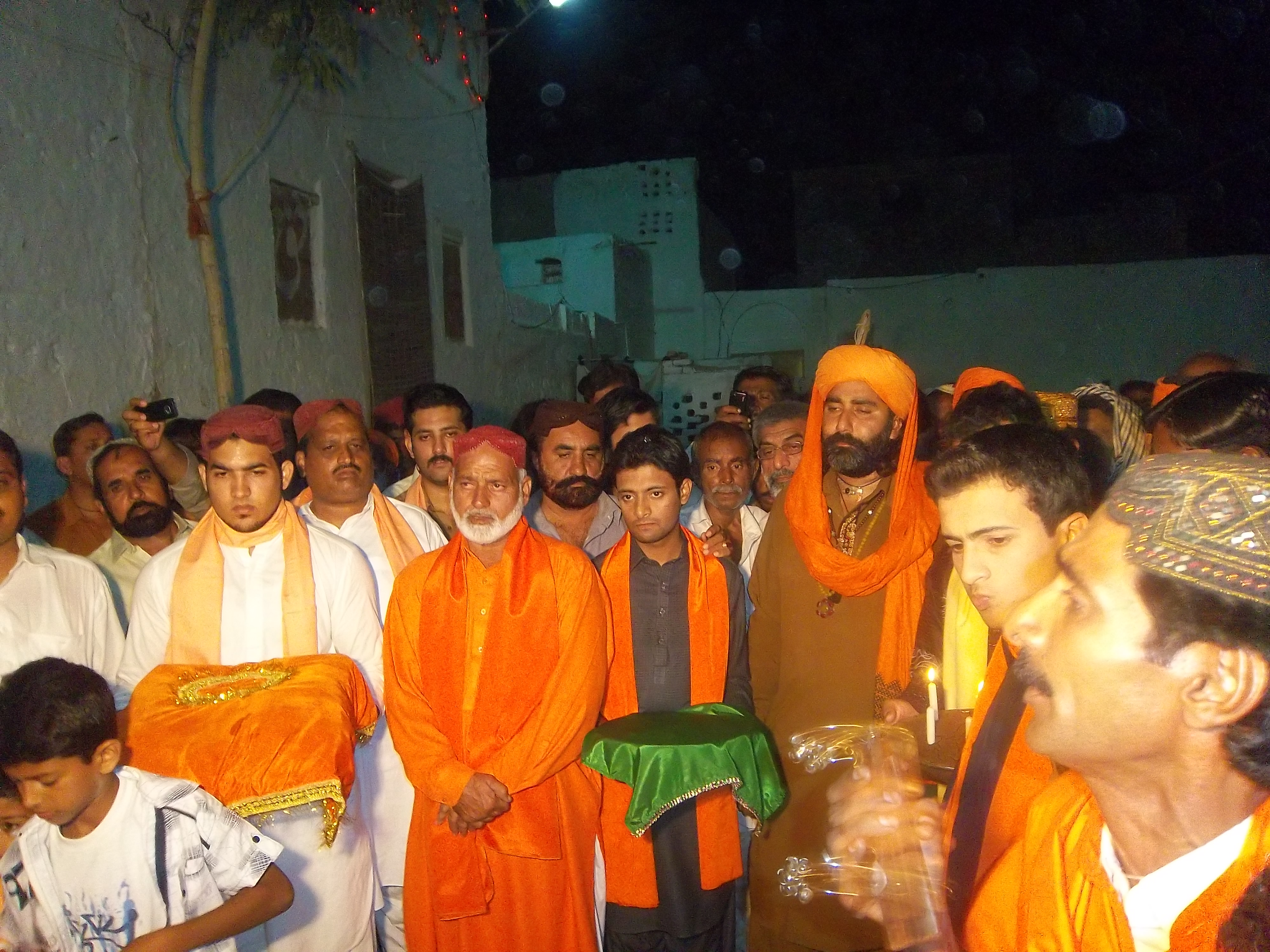
Urs starts by taking out mehndi (henna) to pay homage to Hazrat Qadir Bux Bedil

His annual Melo or Urs (death anniversary celebration) is held at his shrine (Dargah) in Rohri on the 14, 15, 16 Dhu al-Qi'dah – the eleventh month of the Muslim calendar where thousands of his Murids (disciples) throng to pay homage to the great saint-poet.

== See also ==
- Sufism in Sindh
