= Rohal Faqir =

18th-century Indian Sufi saint and mystic

Sufi Rohal Faqir

صوفي روحل فقير
- Born: 1734 A.D (1124 Hijri); Padma-Bhit, Umerkot, Sindh
- Died: 1804 A.D; Kandri, Sindh
- Venerated in: Islam, Hinduism
- Influences: Shah Inayat Shaheed
- Influenced: Shahu Faqir, Ghulam Ali Faqir, Khuda Bux Faqir, Darya Khan Faqir
- Tradition or genre: Poetry, Sufism and Mysticism

Sufi Rohal Faqir (1734–1804) (Sindhi: صوفي روحل فقير) was a saint-poet and mystic, and exponent of sophistic philosophy. Zangeja by caste, Sunni Qadiri Muslim by religion and a Sufi by practice, he was considered to be the great saint poet Kabir reborn in Sindh. Rohal was the progenitor of the famous kandri sharif tribes of the poets and man of piety. He reached the heights of Sufism through blessings of Sufi-sage Shah Inayat, the famous martyr. In his poetry he expresses his message of giving up egoism and hatred and following the cult of love. Sufi Rohal was first person to fuse vedantic elements with Muslim Sufi concepts. Now his shrine at Kandri Sharif Taluka Rohri District Sukkur.

== Birth ==
Sufi Rohal Faqir, son of Shahu Faqir Zangejo is believed to have been born in 1734 A.D. at "Padma Bhit" near Umerkot, Sindh. According to another tradition, he was born in 1124 (Hijri) at the village which was later called "Rohal Wai". The village still exists in the district of Umarkot, Sindh. Other nominant Sindhi cultural and patriotic poets of that village are Muhammad Juman Darbadar aka Mama Juman Saand and Abdul Haleem Baghi. He had two brothers, Sultan and Mayvo.

== Attachment with court ==
Sufi Rohal's father Shaho Faqir was attached with the court of Kalhora dynasty ruler Miyan Din Muhammad (Died 1111 Hijri). He was among the advisor of Miyan Din Muhammad. Recognizing the services of his father, he was entered in official service. With the passage of time, he managed to reach close to royal court of Kalhora ruler, Miyan Ghulam Shah Kalhoro and he was made the minister of royal treasury in 1762 which continued till 1782 Hijri.

Sufi Rohal Faqir instead of indulging himself into the pleasures of official service, he would ponder and desire for the ultimate truth that he was missing very dearly from his life. His service tenure was full of honesty and trust that may be the reason of winning the trust of court. He never left side of sincerity and dedication to his official job. In 1772 A.D. when Miyan Ghulam Ali Shah Kalhoro died and his son Miyan Sarfraz Kalhoro took up the office. Sufi Rohal, very soon, realised the reality of transitory world and gave resignation from his job. Though he was insisted by Miyan Sarfraz to stay in his service because of unmatched and dedicated service, this time Sufi Rohal made up his mind to seek the truth and move in the journey towards Beloved.

== Spiritual journey ==
From then on, he started searching for spiritual guide. He quest took him to Jhok Sharif (Miranpur) in District Thatta at the moment, where he found his spiritual guru in form of Sufi Izatullah Shah Sufi-ul-Qadri. He was entered into the discipleship and he quenched his spiritual thirst. It is said that during his stay at Jhok Sharif, he performed secluded meditative worship. After his return, there was a sea change in his life. Now he had turned into a pure practising Sufi.

== Marriage ==
Sufi Rohal married twice in his life. From first marriage, he had two sons: (1) Shahu Faqir (2) Ghulam Ali Faqir. In second marriage, Sufi Murad Faqir, a close relative of Rohal Faqir gave him the hand of his sister. From this marriage, (1) Sufi Khuda Bux and (2) Sufi Darya Khan were born.

== Travels ==
Sufi Rohal Faqir travelled most of his time in life. It is said that after freeing himself from service of finance minister, he was appointed as ambassador. In this position, he travelled to Jaisalmir, Jodhpur, Baikanir and some other far off places of current India. Though his mother tongue was Seraiki, while travelling to the desert of Thar, he learnt and mastered himself in Dhatki, Marwari and Hindi.

== Meeting Maharaja Bijai Singh ==
During his travels as ambassador, he preached the divine message of mysticism to Hindu rajas and people. Sufi Rohal Faqir met Mahraja Bijay Singh at Jodhpur where he wrote Hindi books of poetry in form of conversation between Guru and disciple. Sufi Rohal faqir stayed at Jodhpur for one month and seven days. During his stays, he had lengthy discussion with pandits (Hindu holy priests), black magicians, sages of Jodhpur in the presence of Maharaja.

Maharaja wanted to test and measure the stature and spiritual power of Sufi Rohal Faqir. Maharaja was amazed at the wealth of knowledge Sufi Rohal possessed. So much so that, he became disciple of Sufi Rohal and asked him to stay at palace as royal as long as he wanted. Sufi Rohal turned down this generous offer and came back to Sindh.

== Renunciation of World ==
Very soon he bid farewell to ambassador duties and initiated the search of Lord. His renunciation from the materialistic world was due to immense love for his creator. Because of this, a salik (traveler of Sufi path) recognised his self to achieve the ultimate aim of his life. According to Dr. Nabi Bux Baloch, "Rohal was the first poet in Sindh who raised the slogan of "I am the One" after being influenced by the philosophy of Hum-o-oost (All is He)".

== Companionship with Murad Faqir ==
A very close relative of Sufi Rohal Faqir, Sufi Murad Faqir happened to be the first person who was influenced by his spiritual teaching. Murad Faqir also took the same path and name of his own. Murad Faqir was ten years younger than Rohal faqir. After the end of Kalhora rule, they both along with their family members migrated to Kotli in District Khairpur. It is a rugged, hilly region where they step up their houses. Sufi Murad faqir died in 1796 in Kotli District Khairpur due to some illness.

== Arrival at Kandiri ==
After his life long companion death, Sufi Rohal did not feel like living at Kotli. Very soon, he migrated from there and travelled west ward. While travelling he was stopped by a thorny bush in which his clothes got stuck. It was a deserted place surrounded by wild thorny bushes. At that time remembered the words of his spiritual guide Sufi Izatullah Shah "Keep moving until you are stopped by something and that will be your place of residence". Sufi Rohal told his family to start making arrangements for setting up permanent residence. From then on, that area started to be called "Kandiri". Sufi Rohal lived his remaining years of his life in Kandiri.

== Death ==
Sufi Rohal Faqir died at the age of 70 in the year 1804 A.D. He was buried in Kandiri, District Khairpur.

== Urs (Annual Fair) ==
His annual Urs (fair) is celebrated by thousands of disciples from Thar, Rahim Yar Khan, Bahawalpur and surrounding areas. During the celebrations, people come to pay homage and distribute their offer in the honour and respect of this great Sufi poet and saint. Moreover, his poetry is sung by the devotees with love and affection. Presently the Gadi Nasheen (Heir of Sufi throne) is Sufi Gulam Rasool Faqeer, sixth person from the progeny of Sufi Rohal Faqir.

== Poetry ==
Sufi Rohal Faqir was Hindu, Sindhi, Persian and Seraiki poet. Today, after Shah Abdul Latif Bhittai, his name is taken as one of the great Sufi poet of Sindh. He authored many songs that are very much popular among people especially among the Hindus.

Sufi Rohal has four books to his credit.

- Man Parbodh (Sindhi: من پرٻوڌ)
- Udhbhit Granth (Sindhi: اُڌڀت گرنٿ)
- Surab Giyan (Sindhi: سُورٻ گيان)
- Agham Warta (Sindhi: آگم ورتا)
