= Hotchand Molchand Gurbakhshani =

British Indian educationist, scholar (1884–1947)

Hotchand Molchand Gurbakhshani هوتچند مولچند گربخشاڻي
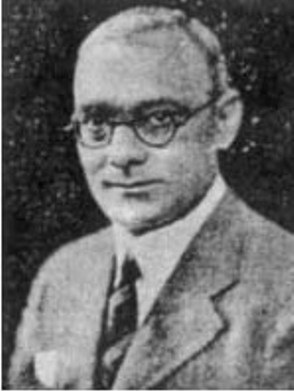
- Born: Hotchand; 8 March 1884; Hyderabad, Sindh, British India
- Died: 11 February 1947 (aged 62); Karachi, British India
- Citizenship: British India
- Education: D.J. Sindh College, Karachi; Wilson College, Mumbai; University of London (Ph.D.)
- Occupations: Scholar, educationist, academic leader
- Writing career
- Genre: Prose
- Notable work: Shah Jo Risalo

Hotchand Molchand Gurbakhshani (or Gurbuxani) (Sindhi: هوتچند مولچند گربخشاڻي) (March 8, 1884 – February 11, 1947) was an educationist and scholar, known for his annotated translation of the Sufi poetic compendium Shah Jo Risalo. He held the position of Principal at D.J. Sindh College Karachi and served as the first president of the Sindh Historical Society.

== Biography ==
Gurbakhshani was born in a well-educated Hindu Amil family in Hyderabad, Sindh, British India (Now Pakistan) on 8 March 1884. His father, Deewan Molchand, served in Revenue Department, while his grandfather, Deewan Nainsukhdas, was a landlord. After completing his Primary School education, he enrolled at the Nevelrai Hiranand Academy in Hyderabad, where he passed his matriculation examination in 1899. He then pursued higher studies in Karachi and earned a Bachelor of Arts degree from D.J. Sindh College, which was one of the premier colleges in Sindh at that time. In 1907, he obtained a Master of Arts degree in English and Persian from Wilson College, Bombay (now Mumbai). He was one of the best students of this college and based on merit he was offered position of assistant professor in the same college. He worked on this position only for a few months and then returned to Sindh and joined his alma mater, D.J. Sindh College, Karachi as a professor of Persian

In 1928, he traveled to the UK and earned a PhD degree from the University of London. His doctoral thesis was on "Mysticism in the Early 19th Century Poetry of England". He dedicated the rest of his life to D.J. College, serving as Dean of the Faculty of Arts, Vice Principal, and later as Principal. On 14 November 1921, on the request of Bombay University, he presented a scholarly report on Sindhi Literature to the university. Based on this report, the Bambay University decided to include Sindhi in college curriculum. Thus he laid the foundation for recognition of Sindhi language and literature in India. Dr Gurbakhshani was also founding President of the Sindh Historical Society. The Journal of this society published valuable research articles on history of Sindh. This Society was founded for restructuring the history of Sindh.

His father and grandfather were devotees of Shah Inayat Sufi, the Sufi saint of Sindh, so he himself was attracted towards Sufism since childhood. His students included Umar Bin Muhammad Daudpota, Miran Mohammad Shah and Muhammad Ayub Khuhro.

== Literary contributions ==
He compiled the Shah Jo Risalo, the poetry collection of Sufi poet Shah Abdul Latif Bhittai. He planned to publish this Risalo in four volumes. However, only three volumes could be published. The fourth volume is missing. Some sources say that he gave his unpublished fourth volume to one of his students for proofreading who misplaced/lost it and could not return it to the author. Other sources are of the opinion that the author could not publish it due to financial problems.

The first volume published in 1923 contained five surs (melodies), 500 baits, 32 wais, along with the meaning and etymology of words and terms. He also explained various verses and discussed the background and the folktales used in the surs. This volume included the Introduction called Muqadema consisting of the Shah's biography, his personality and religion. This introduction was later slightly revised and published as separate booklet Muqdama-i-Lateefi, in 1936, translated into English by Dr Habibullah Siddiqui and published by the Institute of Sindhology in 2009.

The second volume was published in 1924 which contained six surs (938 baits, 78 wais). The third volume published in 1931 contained 601 baits and 32 wais.

His other publications included the following:

- Shah Namah Abul Qasim Hassan Firdousi (Translation from Persian), Union Steam Press Karachi, 1918.
- Rooh Rihan, 1933
- Noor Jahan (Novel)
- Lunwaria Ja Lal (The Saints of Lunwari)

== Book on Hotchand Molchand Gurbakhshani ==
Jettley M., Jotwani M.L. (Editors), Dr Hotchand Molchand Gurbakhshani: Sandin Jeewan Churpur and Rachnaoon (ڊاڪٽر هوتچند مولچند گربخشاڻي: سندن جيون چرپر ۽ رچنائون), New Delhi, India, 1983.

== Death ==
Gurbakhshani died on 11 February 1947 in Karachi, Pakistan, at the age of 64. He had a son named Mohan, who was married to Sati, the daughter of the scholar Bherumal Meharchand Advani.
