= Khawaja Muhammad Zaman of Luari =

Sufi saint and poet (1713–75)

Khawaja Muhammad Zaman
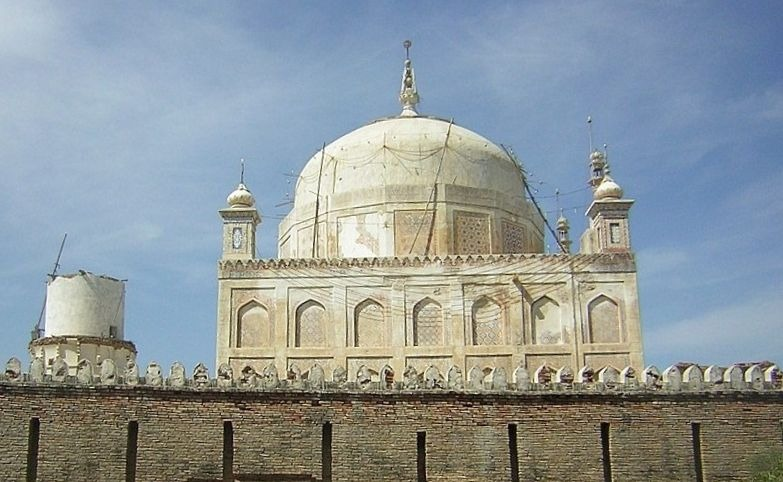
- Tomb of Khawaja Muhammad Zaman in Luari, Sindh
- Title: Sultan-al-Aoliya

Personal life
- Born: 12 October 1713 AD (Ramadan 21, 1125 A.H.) Luari, Sindh
- Died: 6 January 1775 AD (Dhul-Qadh 4, 1188A.H.) Luari, Sindh

Religious life
- Religion: Sunni Islam
- Tariqa: Naqshbandi

Khawaja Muhammad Zaman of Luari (1713 - 1775 AD : 1125 - 1188 AH) (Sindhi: خواجہ محمد زمان لواري وارو) was a sufi saint and poet from Sindh. His father, Shaikh Abdul Latif Siddiqi, was a descendant of first Rashidun Caliph Abu Bakr. Their forefathers had moved to Sindh in Abbasid era.

== Biography ==
Shaikh Abdul Latif was a follower of the Naqshbandi Sufi sect so Muhammad Zaman learned Quran and Sufi teachings from his father. Then he was sent to Thatta to study further in the Madrassa of Shaikh Muhammad Sadiq Naqshbandi who was a follower of Shah Abdul Latif Bhittai. During this time he met Khawaja Abul Masakin, who was a Sufi saint and a follower of the Sirhandi saints, and left the madrassa of Muhammad Sadiq Naqshbandi to start Sufi training under Abul Masakin from whom he later earned the title of Sultan Al Aoliya (Master of Sufis). After some time Abul Masakin appointed him his successor and himself went to Mecca for Hajj where he died shortly afterward. Muhammad Zaman then started preaching sufism, training people in the path of divine love. By this time he was a complete Sheikh. Later, Muhammad Zaman moved to his home town Luari and continued his preachings, where he attracted masses of people around him.

Shah Abdul Latif Bhittai, a Sufi poet himself, once came to Luari to meet Muhammad Zaman. After the meeting Latif is said to have repeatedly recited this verse in praise of Muhammad Zaman:

سي مون ڏٺا ماء جنين ڏٺو پرين کي
تنين سندي ڪا ڪري ن سگھان ڳالھڙي

Translation:

O, mother! I have seen those who have met the Beloved face to face
I am speechless to recount their glorious tale.

He died on January 6, 1775 (Dhul-Qadh 4, 1188 AH), and his tomb is in Luari, Sindh.

== Poetry ==
Muhammad Zaman was also a sufi poet. Though he is said to have said hundreds of poems but only 85 have been available in written form. A collection of these poems is Abyat Sindhi (Sindhi poems). Faqir Abdul Raheem Garhori, one of his disciples, has written a comprehensive commentary and explanation of these poems, called Sharah Abyat Sindhi. They reflect deep mysteries of sufism and general common sense. Though he was a Naqshbandi and all Naqshbandi sufis follow Wahdat-ash-Shuhūd he seems to have merged Wahdat-ash-Shuhūd and Wahdat-al-Wujūd in his poetry. He says:

سرتيون سٽ ڪپاھ ماريو م منصور کي
ٿي ترڪيب تباھ وحدت وايُ وات مِ

Translation:

O, friends! do not kill Mansoor as the yarn is nothing else but cotton itself in modified form
When assemblage is gone, there is no difference between two and one will definitely shout of the unity of existence.

This implies that claim of Mansoor Ana-al-Haqq (I am God: Haqq is a name of God in Islam) was not pointless as he had discovered the fact that his existence and that of the universe was nothing but the manifestation of God's attributes, as the yarn is nothing but cotton, therefore Mansoor should not be killed. At some other point he says in favour of Shuhūd:

پاڻي لھر پسڻ مِ برابر ٿيا
ڪي اتي يُ اڙيا ڪي لنگھي مقصد مڙيا

Translation:

Water and waves seem to be one thing, not two
Some thought it is the reality while some perceived non-existence of waves on their own.

Thus, while the universe does not have its own existence, it is not the same as God. But generally, it is considered that he was neither on side of Wahdat-al-Shuhūd completely nor in complete favour of Wahdat-al-Wujūd, instead he combined both ideologies to show that the differences in between them were mere of words and not real.

== See also ==
- Muhammad 'Abid al-Sindi
- Sufism in Sindh
- List of Sufis
