= Mir Janullah Shah =

18th-century Islamic mystic

Sayed Jan Muhammad Shah Rizwi
- Title: Mir Janullah shah

Personal life
- Born: Sindh
- Died: 1754
- Era: Medieval
- Region: Sindh, Pakistan
- Main interest: Sufi poetry
- Notable idea(s): Mysticism, Persian Sufi poetry

Religious life
- Religion: Islam
- Creed: Sufism

Muslim leader
- Influenced by: Shah Inayat Shaheed, Bedil, Bekas

Mir Jan Muhammad Rizwi of Rohri, Sindh famous under his nom-de-plume Mir or Mir Janullah (died 1754) was chief Khalifa of Sufi Shah Inayat Shaheed who is related to have told people: "Who ever sees Janullah, sees me" for Janullah had reached the complete Fana fil Shaykh, the identification with his mystical leader.

He witnessed the siege of Jhok and returned to Rohri after Shah Inayat's execution.
