= Kandri =

- village
- Location in Maharashtra, India
- Coordinates: 19.98°N 80.43°E
- Country: India
- State: Maharashtra
- District: Nagpur
- Elevation: 311 m (1,020 ft)

Population (2001)
  - Total: 8,125

Languages
  - Official: Marathi
- Time zone: UTC+5:30 (IST)

Kandri is a Small village near Kanhan city in Nagpur district in the Indian state of Maharashtra.

== Geography ==
It has an average elevation of 311 metres (1020 feet).

== Demographics ==
As of 2001 India census, Kandri had a population of 8125. Males constitute 52% of the population and females 48%. Kandri has an average literacy rate of 72%, higher than the national average of 59.5%: male literacy is 78%, and female literacy is 66%. In Kandri, 12% of the population is under 6 years of age.

Year	Male	Female	Total Population	Change	Religion (%)							
Year	Male	Female	Total Population	Change	Hindu	Muslim	Christian	Sikhs	Buddhist	Jain	Other religions and persuasions	Religion not stated
2001	4244	3880	8124	-	84.097	2.363	0.825	0.209	12.371	0.086	0.049	0.000
2011	5529	5095	10624	30.773	85.768	3.906	0.725	0.489	9.036	0.038	0.000	0.038
