= Syed Sharf Deen Baghdadi =

Sindhi Hanbali and Sufi based in Baghdad (1890-1958)

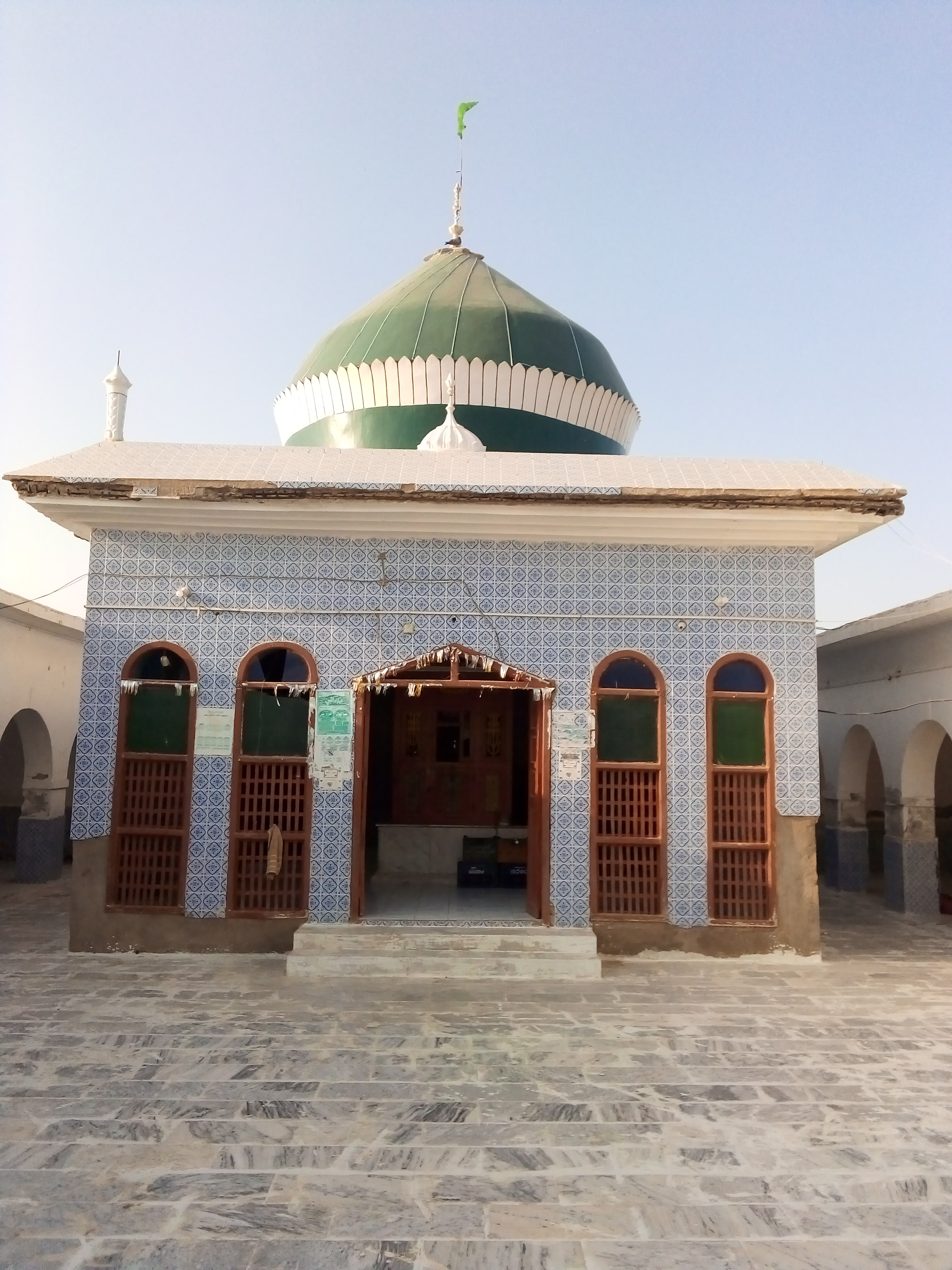
- Recently Shrine picture Syed Sharf Deen Baghdadi 2020
- Title: Goas _e_Azam

Personal life
- Born: March 23, 1890 CE Gilan, Ottoman Empire
- Died: December 31, 1958 CE (11 Jamadal-Thani, 1379 AH) (aged 68). Kharo Dero, Rato Dero Sindh Pakistan
- Resting place: Kharo Dero Sindh Pakistan
- Children: Syed Talal Ibrahim Baghdadi
- Era: Islamic Modernism
- Region: Baghdad
- Main interest(s): Fiqh, Sufism, aqidah

Religious life
- Religion: Islam
- Denomination: Sunni
- Jurisprudence: Hanbali
- Tariqa: Qadiriyya

Syed Sharf Deen Gillani Baghdadi (1890-1958) a famous Arab Islamic preacher of Islam Arrived in Sindh mid 1920. He based his preaching activities from Kharo Dero Sindh, according to some traditions in that region a lot injustice prevailed that's why Syed Sharf Deen Baghdadi settled there, he was the decedent of Abdul Qadir Gilani, in beginning time he just stayed inside Kharo Dero but later years his followers increased in nearby Vinicity, his famous follower was Mitho Abro and then his Son Muharram Ali Abro, Syed Shraf Deen Baghdadi yearly visited his family to Iraq but final years he stopped to going there, He died on 31 December 1958 at Karachi Pakistan, his sons arrived there to take his body back to Iraq but Syed Sharf Deen Baghdadi said his followers before his death that don't allow my sons to take my body back to Iraq if they forced you just show them my written statement. His shrine was constructed during Benazir Bhutto time in 1990 half expenditure borne by Syed Sharf Deen Baghdadi son Syed Talal Ibrahim Baghdadi.
