= Shah Inayat Shaheed =

Sindhi Sufi saint and revolutionary (c. 1655–1718)

Shah Inayatullah
- شاه عنایت اللہ
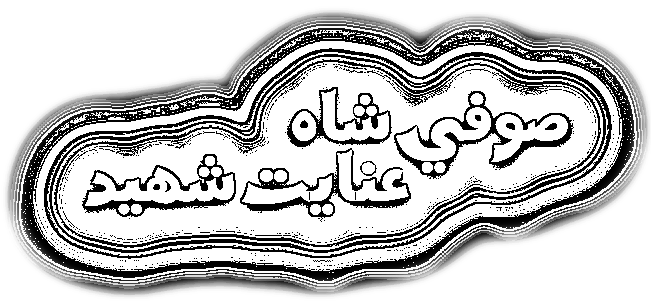
- Written name of Shah Inayat in Sindhi
- Title: Hazrat; Sultan ul-Arifeen; Shah Shaheed

Personal life
- Born: c.1655 (AH 1665)
- Died: 7 January 1718 (Safar 17,1130 AH)
- Era: Medieval
- Region: Sindh, Mughal Empire
- Known for: Sufi poetry, Social reforms

Religious life
- Religion: Islam
- Denomination: Sunni
- Order: Sufi al-Qadiri
- Creed: Sufism
- Initiation: into Sufi al-Qadiri Tariqah by Shah Abdul Malik of Bijapur

Muslim leader
- Teacher: Shah Abdul Malik of Bijapur
- Successor: Izzatullah Shah Gundpir
- Influenced: Mir Janullah Shah, Shah Abdul Latif Bhittai, Sachal Sarmast, Rohal Faqir, Bedil

Shah Inayatullah (Sindhi: شاه عنایت اللہ; c. 1655 – 1718), popularly known as Sufi Shah Inayat Shaheed, Shah Shaheed or Shah Inayat of Jhok, was a 17th-century Sindhi Sufi saint and revolutionary from Jhok.

He was executed on the order of Mughal Emperor Farrukhsiyar in the early eighteenth century. Sufi Inayat was accused of leading a small army of peasants (Harees) to challenge the domination of Farrukhsiyar, local feudal landlords, and Mullahs. His mantra, “Jo Kherray so Khaey” (Sindhi: جو کيڙي سو کائي), means, "The one who plows has the foremost right on the yield." His popularity forced the feudal landlords to contact Farrukhsiyar, who ordered the ruler of northern Sindh Mian Yar Muhammad Kalhoro to uproot Inayat and his companions. A prolonged siege of Jhok resulted in an offer of negotiations from the Kalhora commander. Sufi Inayat accepted the offer to avoid further bloodshed, but was instead arrested and later executed in Thatta.,

== Early life ==
Shah Inayat was born in 1655/56 A.D to a Sindhi Langah family in Miranpur, Sindh near Jhok where Thatta-Tando Mohammad Khan-Hyderabad road stands in modern times. His father Makhdum Fazlullah provided his early education. He travelled the subcontinent to find a spiritual guide (murshid). He arrived in Burhanpur and became initiated into the Qadiriyya order. He travelled to Bijapur and from there to Delhi. In Bijapur, he was a disciple of Shah Abdul Malik ibn Shah Ubaidullah Jilani Qadiri. When his learning was complete, he took leave from his murshid. Before his departure, Shah Abdul Malik placed four things before his disciple: a tasbeeh, a prayer mat, a karaa, and a sword. Shah Inayat chose the sword (a symbol of martyrdom), to which his murshid asked: 'O fakir what price will you pay for this gift?' He replied: "The price is my head."

== Influence ==
Once back in Miranpur, Shah Inayat spent his days in meditation and prayer. He had inherited a vast tract of land from his ancestors near his hometown. His message was one of love, tolerance, and equality. Peasants left their respective lands to join his commune to work for Shah Inayat as he had organized collective farming on his own lands. He had raised the slogan, "One who tills the land should eat [the crop]".

He established a monastery (khangah) at Miranpur and distributed his land among the landless tillers (harees). He expressed opposition to the landlords (zamindar) as well as orthodox theologians. He attracted many followers among the peasantry, and organized them against the rulers, landlords and religious scholars, urging them not to pay agriculture tax to the rulers or give a share of their produce to the landlords. The landlords and orthodox mullahs then aligned against him and complained to Azam Khan, governor of Thatta Sarkar that Shah Inayat was trying to overthrow the government.

== Battle of Jhok ==
Shah Inayat's rising influence among his followers in the area of lower Sindh (Thatta Sarkar) caused much discontent in Yar Muhammad Kalhoro, the feudal lord. The latter enjoyed political sway over Bakhar Sarkar (Northern Sindh) and Sehwan Sarkar (Central Sindh) and thus wanted to control over Thatta Sarkar which was still under the rule of Mughal Nawabs. Kalhoro, the first ruler of Kalhora dynasty, strove to consolidate his power across Sindh, but found the social movement of Sufi Shah Inayat a hurdle in realizing his ambition. Thus he, along with other influential landlords, and Pirs of Dargah succeeded in persuading the Delhi government to act against Shah Inayat and his followers for their rebellion against the Mughal Empire. A battle was launched on Farrukhsiyar's order with the combined forces of Kalhora Chief and the Mughal army of governor of Thatta.

The Battle of Jhok was a clash between the Mughal forces along with their local rulers and a band of Sufis who chose to revolt against the feudal and imperial order of the day. A siege was laid to the town of Jhok for about four months, but Shah Inayat's followers gave a stiff resistance. Shah Inayat was preparing to attack the invaders on 1 January 1718 AD, when the Kalhora chief sent Shahdad Khan Talpur with the Quran to invite Shah Inayat for peace talks. However, when Shah Inayat met Yar Muhammad Kalhoro for talks, he was arrested, brought to Thatta and presented to the Mughal governor.

== Silsilah of Sufi al-Qadiri Tariqah ==
1. • Prophet Muhammad
2. • Caliph Ali ibn Abi Talib
3. • Imam Husayn
4. • Imam Ali Zayn al-Abidin
5. • Imam Muhammad Baqir
6. • Imam Ja'far as-Sadiq
7. • Imam Musa al-Kazim
8. • Imam Ali Musa Rida
9. • Ma'ruf Karkhi
10. • Sari Saqati
11. • Junayd al-Baghdadi
12. • Shaikh Abu Bakr Shibli
13. • Shaikh Abdul Aziz Tamimi
14. • Abu al-Fadl Abu al-Wahid al-Tamīmī
15. • Abu al-Farah Tartusi
16. • Abu al-Hasan Farshi
17. • Abu Sa'id al-Mubarak Makhzoomi
18. • Abdul Qadir Jilani
19. • Abdul Razzaq Gilani
20. • Shahabuddin
21. • Muhammad Shah ibn Ahmad Shah
22. • Hassan Shah Baghdadi
23. • Muhammad Shah Baghdadi
24. • Sayyid Ali Shah
25. • Sayyid Musa Shah
26. • Sayyid Mir Hassan Shah
27. • Sayyid Abu al-Abbas Ahmad Shah
28. • Khwaja Bahauddin Ibrahim
29. • Abu al-Fath Shams al-Din known as "Sheikh Shahi"
30. • Syed Abdul Malik Shah of Bijapur
31. • Shah Inayat Shaheed

Shah Inayat Shaheed's silsilah also includes common figures with the Qadiri-Barkati-Rizvi Silsilah of Ahmed Raza Khan Barelvi, namely, Sayyid Ali, Sayyid Musa, Sayyid Hassan, Sayyid Ahmad and Khwaja Bahauddin.

== Custodians and successors ==
Sufi Attaullah Sattari is the present Sajjada Nashin of Dargah Jhok Sharif. He succeeded his father and murshid Sufi Irshad Sattari in 1974. At a young age of 22, he took over the responsibilities of shrine.

Line of successors:

1. Izzatullah Shah Gundpir
2. Muhammad Zahid Shah Kalaan
3. Muhammad Ibrahim Shah Qataal
4. Izzatullah Shah Sakhi Pir
5. Muhammad Ibrahim Shah Banglay-Dhareen
6. Muhammad Zahid Shah alias Wasan Sain
7. Abdul Sattar Shah I
8. Ghous Baksh Shah alias Hadi Sain
9. Abdul Sattar Shah II
10. Sufi Ghous Muhammad alias Sufi Irshad Abbas
11. Sahib Karim Sufi Ataullah Sattari

== See also ==
- Mir Janullah Shah
- Shah Abdul Latif Bhittai
- Rohal Faqir
- Qadir Bux Bedil
- Shah Inayat Rizvi
- Shah Inayat Qadiri
- Túpac Amaru II
- Sufi Siddique Faqir
