= Muhammad Mohsin Bekas =

19th-century Sindhi Sufi poet and saint

درگاه بيدل بيڪس
- Born: January 31, 1859 AD/Jumada II 1275 AH; Rohri, SindhPakistan
- Died: August 1, 1881/5 Ramadan 1298 AH; Rohri
- Venerated in: Islam, Hinduism
- Influences: Qadir Bux Bedil
- Tradition or genre: Poetry

Muhammad Mohsin (1859–1882) was a Sindhi poet, better known by his nom-de-plume Bekas. He was the son of Faqeer Bedil and the first follower of his school of thought in poetry. They are buried at the same place so the shrine is commonly known as the shrine of Bedil and Bekas.
