= Shah Inat Rizvi =

Sindhi Sufi Poet (c. 1613–1701)

Shah Inayat Rizvi
- Born: 1613
- Hometown: Nasirpur, Mughal Empire (present day Sindh, Pakistan)
- Died: 1701 (aged 87–88)
- Tradition or genre: Poetry

Shah Ïnayatullah (Sindhi: شاه عنایت اللہ) (c. 1613 – 1701), Shah Inayat or Inat, was a 17th-century Sindhi Sufi poet from Nasirpur, Sindh.

== Biography ==
=== Early life ===
He belonged to a branch of the Rizvi Syed family, which originated from Bukkur in Sindh province. Sometime during the 14th–16th centuries, Ïnayatullah's ancestors settled at Nasarpur, in the present Hyderabad District. His father, Shah Nasruddin, was a respectable religious man who in his advanced age left the Suhrawardiyyah order of Sufis, to which the Rizvi Syeds traditionally belonged, to become a follower of Shah Khairuddin of Sukkur. According to family lore, the birth of Shah Ïnayatullah to Shah Nasruddin at such an elderly age was made possible by the blessings of Shah Khairuddin. The birth date of the poet is not recorded, but it may be inferred that he was born during the decade of the saint's death (between 1613–1623).

In accordance with the family tradition of the Syeds in Sindh, Shah Ïnayatullah would have received his basic education in a local madrasah, but internal evidence from his poetry shows his advanced knowledge of Persian, Arabic and Islamic philosophy. Additionally, there is ample proof of his intimate knowledge of music, the Sufi saints, the life of villagers in Sindh and their folk-ways and folk-tales, and of various places, particularly in the Sindh region and the adjoining country of Kutch. He seems to have travelled far and wide in these areas.

== Poetry ==
Shah Ïnayatullah was a classical poet in as much as he used the classical Sindhi idiom and employed the classical forms of Sindhi bait and waee or kafi in his poetry. Yet he heralded a new era in the domain of Sindhi poetry by combining the poetic contents of the age-old bardic tradition and the more cultivated spiritual thought of the Sufi-saint poets. Prior to this, Sindhi poetry had been nurtured by country bards and professional minstrels to commemorate the valour of heroes in wars or the munificence of the generous in peace, and to entertain the people by composing and singing their fold tales and pseudo-historical romances. It was also employed by the Sufis and the saints as a medium to express their spiritual ideas and experiences or convey their personal approval or disapproval of the deeds of contemporary individuals.

According to the family accounts, from childhood Miyun Shah Inat was fond of music and would sit listening to the musicians and the professional minstrels in the village assemblies. By birth he belonged to an orthodox Syed family and was conversant with the spiritual contents of the poetry of his predecessors. Combining the two traditions, he forged a new line as a saint-poet of the people singing about their heroes in war and peace and their traditional tales and romances as well as about the traders, weavers, and monsoon rains on which the prosperity of the people depended. He also dealt with the spiritual themes of love and hope, and composed verses in praise of the saints and selfless devotees in the search of God.

The volume of his poetry that has survived pertains to twenty-two main topics covering all the above themes, each a chapter by itself, headlined in the extant manuscripts as "SURUD", indicating the specific mode in which each one was to be sung. Thus, a background of musical tradition is implicit in the poetic compositions of Miyun Shah Inat, though due to a long lapse of time the conceptual pattern of music is lost to us and only the text has survived.

== Legacy ==
The new era in Sindhi poetry heralded by Miyun Shah Inyat soon found its greatest exponent in Shah Abdul Latif (1689–1752) who was in his twenties or younger when Shah Inat died. According to oral tradition, Shah Abdul Latif is said to have met the elderly Shah Inat one more than one occasion, when they would recite to each other some of their parallel verses on common themes. Whether or not this is true, there remains no doubt that young Shah Abdul Latif was strongly influenced by the form and technique used by Miyun Shah Inat, and within the framework of his own poetic genius he adopted them, to the extent of using some of the same idioms and expressions, though with a more precise skill and insight. Shah Abdul Latif reached higher in the realm of ideas than Miyun Shah Inat who, as a pioneer, was mainly concerned with the contents of his new themes and experiments in the use of idiom and imagery to render the description more vivid and more poetic. In so doing, he set the fashion and paved the way for the advent of Shah Abdul Latif, the immortal poet of the Sindhi language and one of the greatest poets of the world.

== See also ==
- Syed Waheed Ashraf
- Tahirul-Qaderi
- Shah Inayat Rizvi
