= Qazi Qadan =

Sindhi sufi mystic and poet

- قاضي قادن
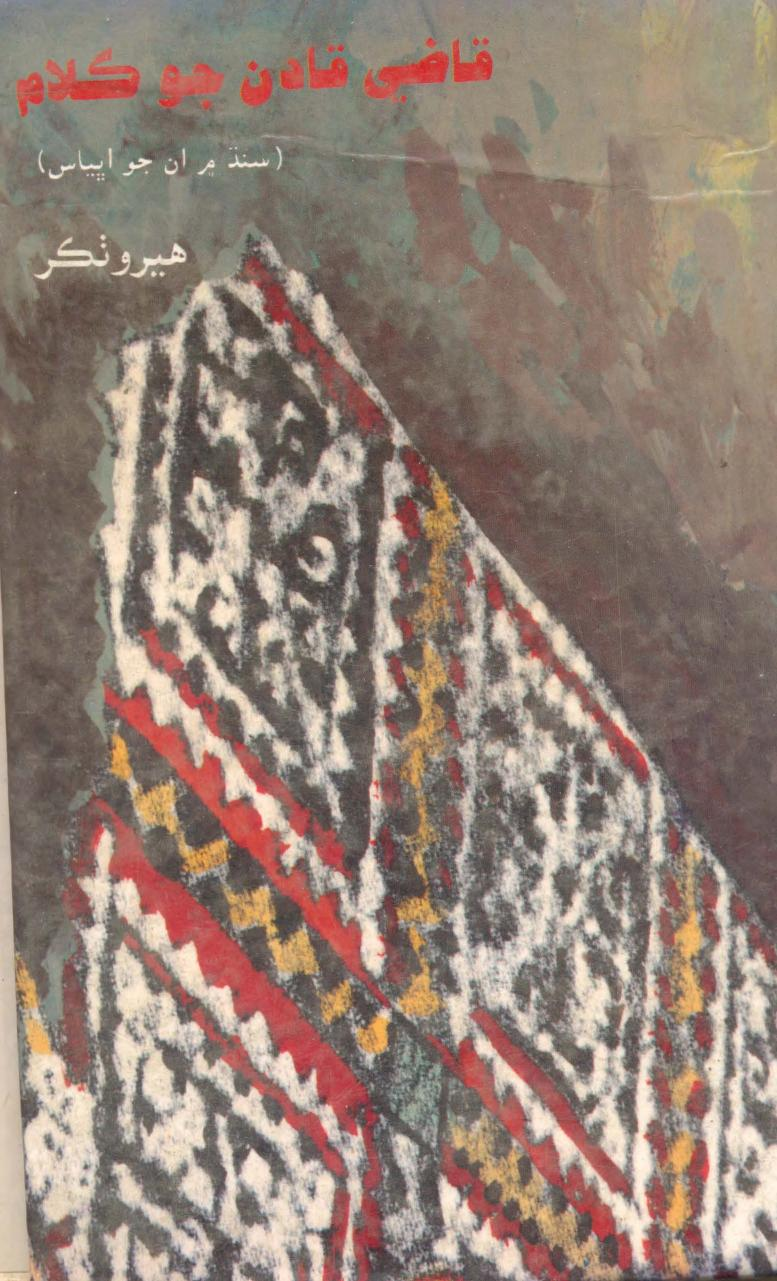
- Born: 1493; Bakhar, Sindh, Samma Dynasty
- Died: 1551 (aged 57–58); Madina, Hejaz, Ottoman Empire
- Children: Bībī Fāṭima (daughter)
- Father: Abu Saeed Bakhari

Philosophical work
- School: Sufism
- Main interests: lyric poetry
- Notable ideas: Sufi poetry, Sufi philosophy, and Sufi music

Qazi Qadan (1493–1551) (Sindhi: قاضي قادن), born in Bakkar/Bukkur (present day Sukkur, Sindh), was the first Sindhi Sufi poet from Sindh in modern-day Pakistan, during the Samma Dynasty. He is also called "The Father of Classical Sindhi Poetry". Qadan died in Madina, Hejaz, Ottoman Empire (present day Saudi Arabia).

== Name ==
There has been a dispute regarding his name. Some have listed it as "Qazi Qazan" and others "Qazi Qadam", the former appearing less frequently in the earliest sources. Many scholars have concluded "Qazi Qazan" was a misspelling of his real name "Qazi Qadan".

== Family ==
Masum Shah writes in his Tariki e Masoom that Qazi came from a pious religious family, his ancestors were from Sehwan and Thatta. His great-grandfather Qazi Abdul-ul-Khair was the first person who migrated to Bukkur. His ancestors were from Sehwan; taking that reference, many scholars likes of Daudpota have called Qazi Qadam "Sehwani" (one who came from Sehwan).

== Religious beliefs ==
According to Mir Muhammad Maʿsumi's Tarikh-i Maʿsumi, Qazi Qadan became a disciple of Syed Muhammad Jaunpuri (d. 1505). Maʿsumi describes Qazi Qadan as a pious scholar knowledgeable in tafsir, Hadith and tasawwuf.
