= Shah Abdul Latif Bhittai =

Sindhi Sufi and poet (1689/1690–1752)

- شاه عبداللطيف ڀٽائي
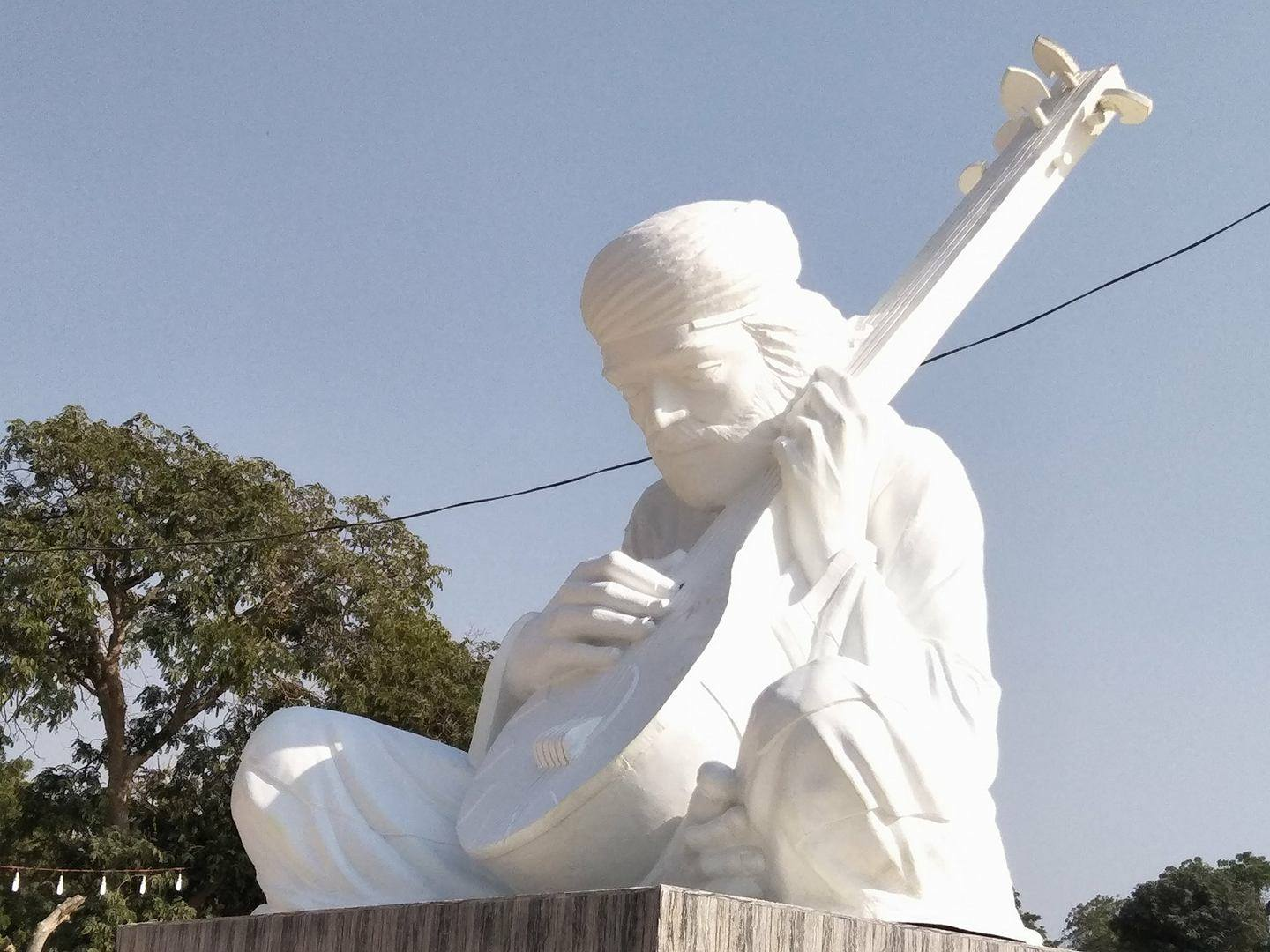
- Bhittai's statue in Bhit Shah

Personal life
- Born: c. 1689 or 1690 Hala Haweli, Thatta Subah, Mughal Empire (present-day Sindh, Pakistan)
- Died: 21 December 1752 (aged 63) Bhit, Sind State (present-day Sindh, Pakistan)
- Resting place: Shrine of Shah Abdul Latif Bhittai, Bhit Shah
- Flourished: Mughal period Kalhora period
- Children: 1 child (died in childhood or miscarried)
- Parent: Syed Habib Shah (father)
- Notable work: Shah Jo Risalo

Religious life
- Religion: Islam
- Denomination: Sunni
- Lineage: Sayyid through Musa al-Kazim
- Jurisprudence: Hanafi
- Tariqa: Qadiri Owaisi

Muslim leader
- Successor: Syed Jamal Shah, inheritor to the Gaddi
- Disciples: Notably, Tamar Faqir, Muhammad Alim, Mahabat Faqir
- Influenced by: Khawaja Muhammad Zaman of Luari; Muhammad Hashim Thattvi; Jalal ad-Din Muhammad Rumi; Shah Abdul Karim Bulri; Shah Inat Rizvi
- Influenced: Ghulam Shah Kalhoro; Sachal Sarmast; Elsa Kazi; Allama I. I. Kazi; Nabi Bux Baloch; Hotchand Molchand Gurbakhshani; Tanveer Abbasi; Bedil; Shaikh Ayaz; Makhdoom Muhammad Zaman Talib-ul-Mola; Syed Ghulam Murtaza Shah

Shah Abdul Latif Bhittai (Note: Sindhi: شاه عبداللطيف ڀٽائي) (c. 1689 or 1690 – 21 December 1752, also known as Lakhino Latif, Latif Ghot, Bhittai, and Bhit Jo Shah) was a Sindhi Sufi and poet who is widely considered to be the greatest poet in the Sindhi language.

Born to a Kazmi Sayyid family of Hala Haweli originating from Herat, near modern-day Hala, Bhittai grew up in the nearby town of Kotri Mughal. At the age of around 20, he left home and traveled throughout Sindh and neighboring lands, and met many mystics and Jogis, whose influence is evident in his poetry. Returning home after three years, he was married into an aristocratic family, but was widowed shortly afterwards and did not remarry. His piety and spirituality attracted a large following as well as the hostility of a few. Spending the last years of his life at Bhit (Bhit Shah), he died in 1752. A mausoleum was built over his grave in subsequent years and became a popular pilgrimage site.

His poems were compiled by his disciples in his Shah Jo Risalo. It was first published in 1866. Several Urdu and English translations of the work have been published since. Bhittai's poetry is popular among the people of Sindh and he is venerated throughout the province.

== Life ==
Tuhfat al-Kiram and Maqalat al-shu'ara, written by Mir Ali Sher Qani Thattvi, a contemporary of Shah Abdul Latif, some fifteen years after the death of the Muslim Saint, gives some basic details of his life. Other than these, however, few written records exist from the early period and most of what has been reported about his ife was transmitted orally through generations. The oral traditions were collected and documented in the late 19th century by Mirza Qalich Beg and Mir Abd al-Husayn Sangi. Together with Thattwi's works, these form the basis for the outline of the poet's life.

Bhittai was born in 1689 or 1690 in Hala Haweli near modern-day Hala, to Shah Habib, a great-grandson of the Sufi poet Shah Abdul Karim Bulri. His ancestors traced their lineage back to the fourth caliph Ali and Fatima, the daughter of the Islamic prophet Muhammad. They had emigrated to Sindh from Herat during the late 14th century. He was born as one of the privileged classes treated with reverence and superstition.

Bhittai spent the early years of his childhood in Hala Haweli, but the family then relocated to the nearby town of Kotri Mughal. Local tradition holds that he was illiterate, however his use of Arabic and Persian in his poetry and the evident influence of the Persian poet Rumi on his thought show that he was well educated. According to Nabi Bakhsh Baloch, Bhittai was socialized in a religious culture dominated by Sayyid sages and in spaces dotted with graves and tombs of saints.

At the age of around 20, he fell in love with Saida Begum, a daughter of an Arghun aristocrat of Kotri Mughal, Mirza Mughal Beg, which landed Bhittai's family in trouble and caused them return to Hala Haweli. Her love, however, had a deep impact on young Bhittai and he left home wandering deserts and embarking on travel through Sindh and adjacent lands. However this unorthodox view of Bhittai's life has been challenged by Nabi Bakhsh Baloch who has said that Bhittai did not fall in love but his father had already married from this Arghun clan, this is more in line with the era and Bhittai's sociality.

According to Motilal Jotwani, it was perhaps during these travels that his poetic nature came to the fore. He mentions the places he visited in his poems. First he went to Ganjo Hill near what is now Hyderabad, thereafter traveling to Kalachi (modern Karachi) through Thatta and Banbhore. On the journey he met Jogis and accompanied them to Hinglaj in the mountains of southern Balochistan. On his return east, he visited Lahut in Lasbela, and then travelled across to Dwarka, Porbandar, Junagadh, and several other places in the Kutch region. Returning west, he visited Karoonjhar Mountains in Nagarparkar. Parting ways with the Jogis in Thar, he went to Jaisalmer before returning to Thatta and then home. His travels seem to have had a strong influence on his poetry.

Those who get acquainted with Ganja Hill,
Become Yogis, forsaking all books and scriptures.

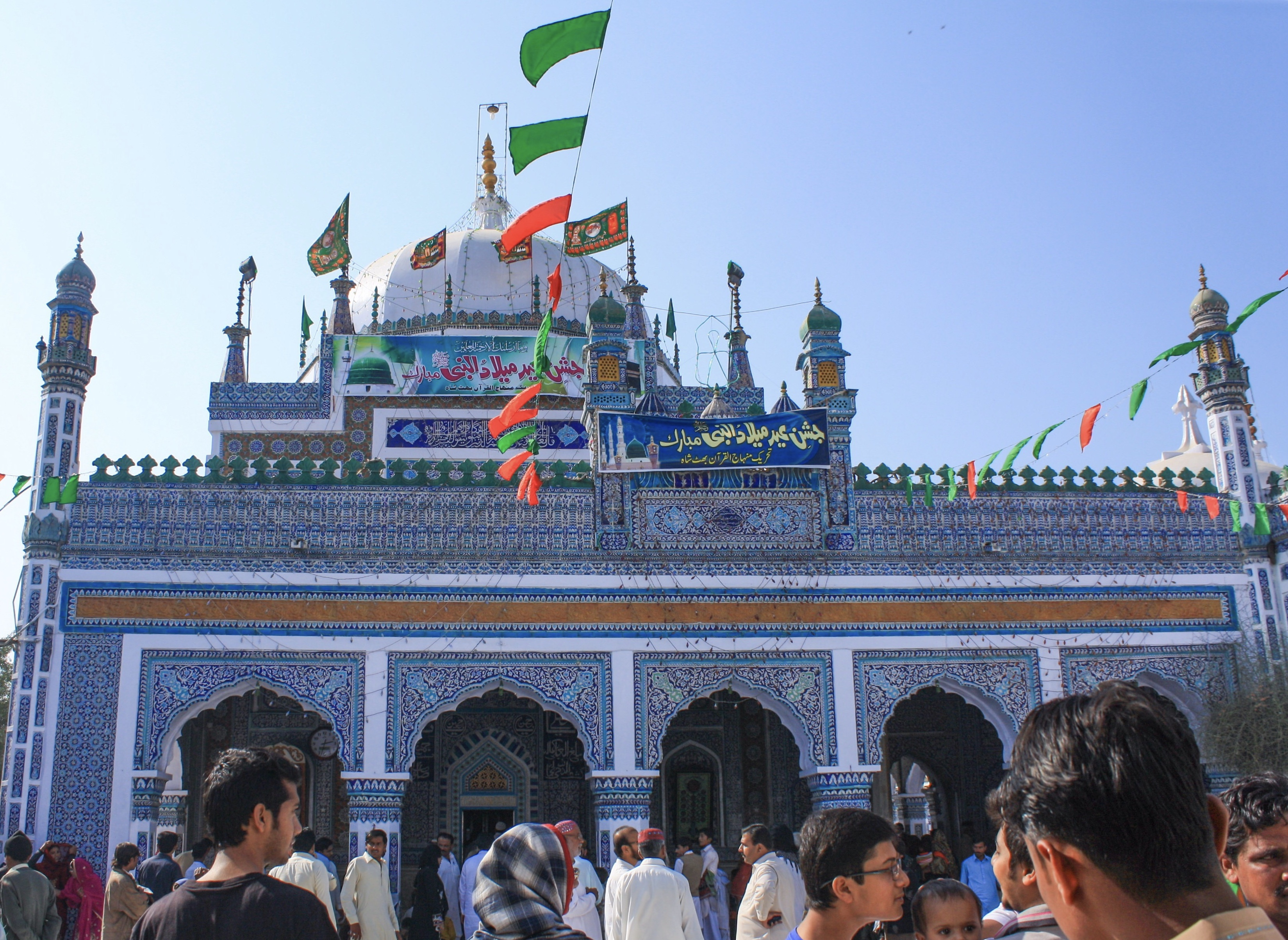
Entry to the shrine

Bhittai returned home after three years.

In 1713 Mirza Mughal Beg (son of Mirza Jani Beg), was killed while in pursuit of robbers who had looted his house. After this incident, Bhittai was married to Saida Begum, the woman whom he had been in love with. The marriage did not result in any offspring and Saida Begum died a few years into the marriage. Bhittai did not remarry and remained childless his entire life.

He now seems to have settled down and devoted to prayer and worship. His piety attracted a large following, which reportedly earned him the hostility of nobles and Noor Mohammad Kalhoro, the ruler of Sindh, who is said to have unsuccessfully tried to assassinate him by poisoning. Noor Mohammad later repented of his treacherous acts and became his disciple. He also provided Bhittai with a copy of Masnavi-e-Ma'navi. It was through Bhittai's blessings that Ghulam Shah was born to Noor Mohammad.

Some ten years before his death, Bhittai left his home, relocating to a sandhill a few miles from Hala Haweli, which later became known as Bhit Shah (Mound of Shah), hence his title Bhittai (the dweller of Bhit). Bhittai died at Bhit on 21 December 1752 (14 Safar 1166 AH) at the age of 63 and was buried there. A tomb was built over his grave by the then ruler of Sindh Mian Ghulam Shah Kalhoro in 1754, or 1765.

=== Accquaintances ===
During his life, Bhittai visited and frequented many orthodox Sunni theologians such as Muhammad Hashim Thattvi (a Qadri), Khawaja Muhammad Zaman of Luari (a Naqshbandi), and Muhammad Muin Thattvi (a Naqshbandi).

Muhammad Muin Thattvi was a Murid in the Naqshbandi Tariqa of Mian Abu'l Qasim Naqshbandi. He was a great theologian, scholar and Sufi of his time. Muhammad Muin Thattvi and Bhittai were close friends. Bhittai often relied and trusted on Muin's theological, jurisprudential and Shari'i knowledge.

=== Risalah-i-Owaisi ===
Nabi Bakhsh Baloch during his academic career and research on Bhittai reproduced this Persian letter known as "Risalah-i-Owaisi" which Bhittai sent to Muhammad Muin Thattvi asking about jurisprudential matters.

In the letter, Bhittai asks Muhammad Muin regarding if the Islamic law (Shari'ah) allows the Owaisi type of transmission in silsila without need for the presence of a physical Murshid to receive silsila from. Bhittai presents five questions in the letter. Bhittai starts off by addressing and asking Muhammad Muin about the opinion of the "Ulama-i-Kiram" regarding the word "Owaisi" which appears in some poems of the Sufis. Bhittai asks in the second question if it is logical and allowed by Shari'ah to take one who is already in the Barzakh as a Murshid. In the third question, Bhittai asks if the "Ulama (theologians)" are opposed to the perspectives of Faqr (asceticism) and Sulook (Sufi path) or not. Bhittai in the fourth question asks regarding and providing an example of a great Wali who does miracles (karamat) and has Murids but he is not associated to any major tariqah (Bhittai gives the example of Naqshbandi and Qadri), so he questions if this can be seen as the Wali's weakness and no foundation within Tariqa. In the fifth question, Bhittai concludes by saying that he asks the scholars of the faith who separate falsehood from truth regarding these questions and hopes for an answer. He also states he has written the letter in simple Persian so that common people may benefit from the letter and makes a short prayer of well-being for Muhammad Muin.

Muhammad Muin begins his response to Bhittai's letter by sending blessings upon Muhammad, his family and his Sahabah (companions). He answers the first question by stating that the term "Owaisi" is for those who gain spiritual guidance from souls. His answer to the second question states that it is allowed by logic and Shari'ah to take someone who has passed away as a Murshid and states many great Saints have done such and this is common among Sufis. He states in the third question's answer that opposition of the sayings of theologians to the perspectives of "Faqr" and "Sulook" are meaningless as in the Shari'ah there is an exception for "Faqr" and "Sulook". In the fourth question's answer, he states that many saints have been in history who did not have a notable silsila and states that these "friends of Allah" spent their life in no fame or notability but were saints, he continues and speaks of Imam Ya'fi's book "Rawdh al-Riyaheen" and says that there is much mention of such saints in the book along with their silsilahs, he also states that men like Hafez's Murshids are not well known and cites Jami to say that there is no obligation for a saint or Sufi to have a manifest Murshid and to say that these saint's Turooq are without foundation is blasphemy. In the answer to the fifth question, he states that research in theology is good to clarify matters and ends off his letter response with his name and mention of himself as a unknowledgeable one.

== Poetry ==
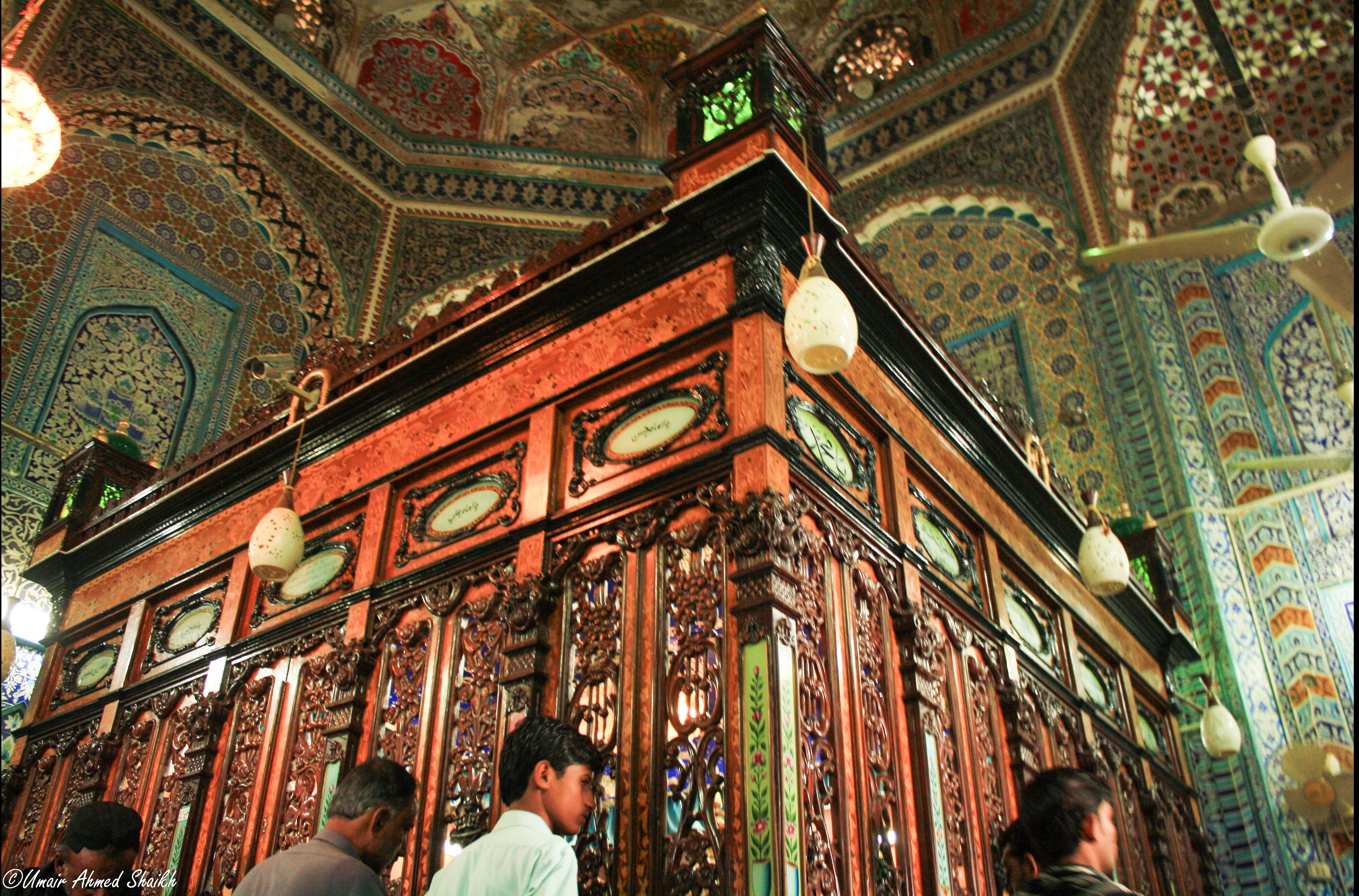
The shrine's inner sanctum is the site of the poet's tomb.

Bhittai's poetry is mainly Sufi in nature and deeply religious. He connects the traditional folk tales with the divine love. The poems, known locally as bayt (pl. abyat) and similar in form to the Indian doha, are lyrical, are intended for a musical performance, and are usually compact.

اڄ پڻ اتر پار ڏي، ڪارا ڪڪر ڪيس
وڄون وسڻ آئيون، ڪري لعل لبيس
پرين جي پرديس، مون کي مينهن ميڙيا

Translation:

Today clouds hang in the north like long black tresses
To signal the rain, flashes of lightning have come like brides in scarlet clothes.
My beloved is far away, but the rain has brought me close to him. (Note: Translation by Christopher Shackle.) (Sur Sarang 1–6)

In addition, he has also used a bit more relaxed format called wa'i.

اکيون پير ڪري، وڃجي، وو! وڃجي
سپريان جي ڳالهڙي، ڪنهن سان ڪين ڪجي
لڪائي لوڪ کان، ڳجهڙي ڳوٺ نجي
محبتيءَ ميهار جو، سور نه ڪنهن سلجي

Translation:

Use your eyes as your feet and go to him, oh go to him
Do not speak about the beloved to anyone
Hide him from everyone, and take him home in secret
Do not reveal to anyone the pain caused by your beloved Mehar. (Sur Suhni 5 wa'i)

Bhittai is said to have always kept with him the Qur'an, Karim jo Risalo, and the Mathnawi of Rumi. He seems to have been significantly influenced by the latter; sometimes he reflects his ideas and sometimes translates his verses in his poems.

هلو هلو ڪاڪ تڙين، جتي نينهن اڇل
نڪا جهل نه پل، سڀڪا پسي پرينءَ کي

Translation:

Come, Come on towards Kaak place, where there is pull of love
And there is no prohibition (discrimination on any basis) all may have opportunity to love, to hope. (Note: Translation by Mubarak Ali Lashari and Muhammad Safeer Awan.)

Bhittai has emphasized that the Sufi should stick to Shari'ah and Ma'arifah (gnosis) in his poetry:

ڪرطريقت تڪيو،شريعت سڃاڻ
هنئون حقيقت هيرتون، ماڳ معرفت ڄاڻ
ھوء ثابوتي ساڻ ، ته پسڻان پالهو رهين ۔

Translation:

Proceed on the path of Tariqat, Recognize the bounds of Shariat,
Acquaint your heart with Haqiqat, Identify your goal as Marifat,
Be in touch with the proof (Murshid), So that you do not go wayward.

Abu Sa'id Abu'l-Khayr, a Persian poet and Sufi mystic (967–1049), has expressed similar idea in his verses which is also quite famously attributed to Rumi:

Come, come, whoever you are,
Wanderer, idolater, worshipper of fire,
Come, and come yet again,
Ours is not a caravan of despair.

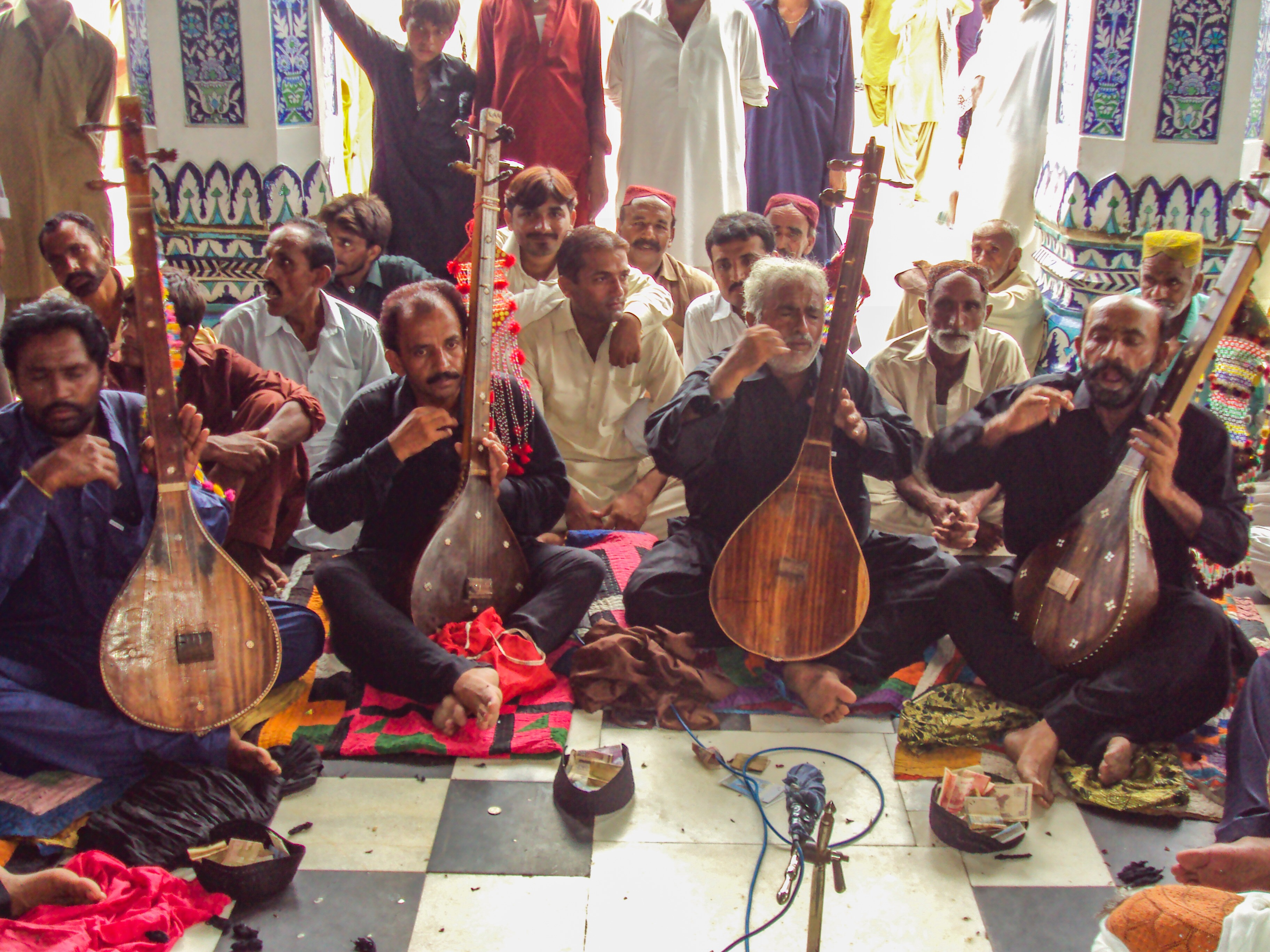
Dervishes singing Shah jo Rag at his shrine

During Bhittai's lifetime, Sindh transitioned from Delhi-based Mughal rule to the local Kalhora dynasty. During the later part of Bhittai's life, Nadir Shah Afshar sacked Delhi and made Sindh his tributary. Bhittai also witnessed Ahmad Shah Durrani's attack on Delhi and his subjection of Sindh to Afghan rule. Despite all this, his poetry is devoid of any mention of these upheavals or the political landscape of his time in general. H. T. Sorley has attributed this to his interest in "eternal verities" and indifference to "transient phenomena" and "petty wars".

=== Risalo ===
Bhittai's poetry was not written down during his lifetime, but was sung and memorized by his disciples during the musical sessions (Rag) that he used to hold. The poems were compiled after his death into a collection called Shah Jo Risalo (the Book of Shah).

The Risalo was first published in 1866 by the German philologist Ernest Trumpp. It contains thirty chapters, called Sur, each focusing on a particular musical mode. Each Sur is further divided into sections, dastan (story) or fasl (chapter), which contain similarly themed abyat. Each section ends with one or more wa'is. Some Surs focus on folk tales of Sindh such as Sassui Punhun, Sohni Mehar, Umar Marui, and Lilan Chanesar, whereas others, like Sur Asa and Sur Yaman Kalyan, describe the mystical moods and ideal traditional lover. Sur Sarang is devoted to the praise of the Muhammad, while Sur Kedaro laments the death of Muhammad's grandson, and Bhittai's ancestor, Husayn ibn Ali at the Battle of Karbala in 680. Sur Kedaro has been said by some prominent scholars of Shah's poetry such as Nabi Bakhsh Baloch, Din Muhammad Wafai and Ghulam Muhammad Shahwani to have come from an external source rather than Shah himself.

Since the first edition of the Risalo, several other editions have been published by various scholars including Mirza Qalich Beg, Hotchand Molchand Gurbakhshani, Ghulam Muhammad Shahvani, Kalyan Advani, and Nabi Bakhsh Baloch. Urdu translations have been published by Shaikh Ayaz, and Ayaz Husayn Qadiri and Sayyid Vaqar Ahmad Rizvi. The first partial English translation of the Risalo was published by H. T. Sorley in 1940, followed by Elsa Kazi, and Ghulam Ali Allana. Complete translations have been published by Muhammad Yakoob Agha, Amena Khamisani, and others. Early manuscripts of the Risalo as well as published editions show considerable differences in the content. The most widely accepted version has some 3,000 abyat and 200 wa'is.

=== Religious beliefs ===
Bhittai's poetry gives great indications and explicit words of what he believed in, regarding theological and religious matters. The very first verses of his Risalo in Sur Kalyan state his explicit monotheistic beliefs and belief that this world was made only for Muhammad, a common belief among Sunni Sufis. He states:

وَحۡدَہٗ لا شَرِيڪَ لَهٗ، جن اُتوسين ايمانَ؛
تن مڃيو مُحمَدُ ڪارَڻِي، قَلبَ ساڻ لِسانَ؛
اُوءِ فائِقَ ۾ فَرمان، اَوَتڙِ ڪنھن نہ اوليا.

Translation:

Those who in Lord’s peerless Oneness believe.
Accept Muhammad's guidance, with heart and speech.
Theirs is abode of bliss, for they abide God's decree
Never misled are they to paths that dubious be.

It also shows that he believes that none of the early Muslims went astray after accepting Islam directly from the Muhammad. In another excerpt from Sur Kalyan, he talks about the "4 companions", Abu Bakr, Umar, Uthman, and Ali, he states:

جوڙي جوڙَ جهَان جِي پاڻَ ڪِيائين پَروارِ
حامِي ھادِي ھاشمِي سَردارين سردارِ،
سُونهي صحابَن سَٿَ ۾ مَنجهہ مَسجِد مڻيادارِ،
چارئي چڱا چوڌار، ھُوا ھيڪاندا حبيب سين.

Translation:

After harmonizing ideally the conditions in the universe Allah manifested Himself through the Prophet Muhammad,
the helper and the guide (to mankind), the scion of the illustrious tribe of Hashmites, and the leader of all Prophets.
It fitted well with his position to be amidst his comrades in that auspicious mosque.
His four companions particularly were constantly with him.

In another excerpt from Sur Kalyan, Bhittai talks about true lovers of God solely being Muslims, having been immersed in God and declared the prophethood of Muhammad. He states:

وَحدَہٗ جٖي وَڍِئا، الاللهَ اَڌَ ڪِئا،
مُحَّمَدُ رَسُولُ چَئِي، مُسلِمانَ ٿِئا،
عاشِقَ عَبدِالْلَطِيفُ چئَي، اِنهين پَھِ پِئا،
جيلاھَ ڌَڻِي ڌُئا، تي وِئا وَحدَتَ گَڏِجِي.

Translation:

Whoso are deeply assimilated in the Oneness of Allah and have reached the state of complete self-effacement,
They have fully recognized the Prophethood of Prophet Muhammad, as the final apostle of Allah and submitted themselves totally to the orders of Allah and the Prophet. Thus they are Muslims.
In recognition thereof Allah has absolved them of all earthly affiliations and impurities, more so because they are assimilated in the Oneness of Allah.

Bhittai in a long verse also expresses his adamant hope in the intercession of Muhammad and talks about how all shalt be saved by his intercession and given refuge in him. He states:

ڍَڪَ ڍَڪِيندو مُون نَہ ڇَڏِيندو، شفيعُ شافِعُ سُپِرِين،
اَنڌا اُونڌا آکُڙِئا، سَڀَ نِباھي نِيندو،
وَٽان ويچارَنِ جي، داڙُو پاڻَ دَڙِيندو،
جي ڏُھارِيَنِ ڏاکَڙا، لَڪَ سي لَنگهائِيندو،
نُورُ ناڪارو نَہ ڪَري، مُحَّمَدُ مِنَٿَ مَڃِيندو،
پاڻُ سُڃاڻِي پاڻِهين، ڪامِلُ ڪَرَمُ ڪَرِيندو،
تَنبُو آڻي تاوَ ۾، عاصِيَنِ لَيءِ اَڏِيندو،
داتا دوزَخِيَنِ کي، لِينگهو لَهرائِيندو،
رَسَڻَ ويرَ رَسِي ڪَري، مُشڪُ رَنگُ مَٽِيندو،
ھِتِ پُڻ حامِي ھِنِ جو، اڳِئان آڳَهُہ ٿيندو،
طَھُورا تَڙِيَنِ کي، پانڊپُ پِئارِئيندو،
رَحْمَةً لِّلْعٰلَمِیْنَ ، اَھکِيءَ آڳَهُہ ٿِيندو،
اُتي عَبدِالْلَطِيفُ کي، ھادِي ھَٿُ جَهلِيندو.

Translation:

He will cover me, not leave me, the intercessor beloved,
He will take along all the blind, disabled and those gone stray,
He will pour medicine into mouth of the sick,
He will take all the sinners across defiles,
The light of God will not say no, He will grant his request,
Here and there he is the support, hereafter also he will be the mainstay,
The lord will offer holly wine,
In awareness of his own self, the perfect one will show kindness,
He will pitch tent for the sinners in the scorching sun on the Day of Judgment,
The generous one will have those marked for hell pardoned,
He will reach at the proper time and anoint all with musk,
The mercy for all worlds will help all in difficulty,
There the guide will hold Abdul Lateef by hand.

In an excerpt from Sur Bilawal, Bhittai talks through the perspective of a oppressed and weak man. He calls for Ali Shah to come and behead "the fire-worshipper". He states:

لِيبي لَعنَتِيءَ کي، آڻِيءَ ۾ آھي،
اَنڌو مُون عَلِيلَ تي، سِينو ٿو ساھي،
عَلِي شاھَ اَچيجِ تُون تَنھِن ڪافِرَ تي ڪاھي،
لُڻِي وِجُهہ لاھي، مَٿو مَجُوسِيءَ جو.

Translation:

The devious and accursed is bent upon mischief,
The blind is harassing a weakling like me,
Come, o Ali Shah, attack the infidel,
Behead him the fire-worshipper.

Bhittai also expresses admiration for the bravery and chivalry of Ali in his poems, glorifying his battle-stance and bravery in the battlefield. He states:

جِئان ڏِنائُون پيرَ، جِئان ڏِنائُون پيرَ،
مَٿي اَڱَڻَ آئِيا، سُونھَڻَ لَڳا سيرَ،
جِئائِين نَبي نِڱِئو، ڀَري مُبارڪَ پيرَ،
ساري شفِيعَ ڄامَ کي، ھِينئَڙِي لَڳِي ھيرَ،
ڀَڳا ڪوٽَ ڪُفارَ جا، اَچِي عَلِيءَ شيرَ،
لَٿا ڏُکَ سُکَ ٿِئا، ٿِي واڌائِيءَ ويرَ.

Translation:

Wherever he put his feet, whatever he saw,
Ali the lion came and smashed the forts of infidels,
As he came in the courtyard, all the path glittered,
Whatever places he touched with his feet,
Sorrows changed into joys, it was time of felicitations.

In apparent manner (prayer, and beliefs), like his forefathers, he was a Sunni and held respect and consideration for all sects. He revered the Muhammad immensely, and he revered the companions of him and revered the Imams as well.

Bhittai also prayed with his hands on his chest like a Hanafi Sunni.

== Tariqah ==
Bhittai gave Bay'ah in the Qadiriyyah Tariqah to his father Shah Habib. His Silsilah is as follows:

1. • Muhammad
2. • Caliph Ali ibn Abi Talib
3. • Imam Husayn
4. • Imam Ali Zayn al-Abidin
5. • Imam Muhammad Baqir
6. • Imam Ja'far as-Sadiq
7. • Imam Musa al-Kazim
8. • Imam Ali Musa Rida
9. • Ma'ruf Karkhi
10. • Sari al-Saqati
11. • Junayd al-Baghdadi
12. • Shaikh Abu Bakr Shibli
13. • Shaikh Abdul Aziz Tamimi
14. • Abu al-Fadl al-Tamimi
15. • Abu al-Farah Tartusi
16. • Abul Hasan Hankari
17. • Mubarak Makhzoomi
18. • Abdul Qadir Jilani
19. • Abdul Razzaq Gilani
20. • Sayyid Imad ud-Din Abu Saleh Abdullāh Nasr Jilani
21. • Sayyid Shams ud-Din Abu Nasr Muhammad
22. • Sayyid Zahir ud-Din Ahmad
23. • Sayyid Saifuddin Yahya
24. • Sayyid Shamsuddin Muhammad
25. • Sayyid Alauddin Ali
26. • Sayyid Nuruddin Hussain
27. • Sayyid Badruddin Yahya
28. • Sayyid Sharafuddin Qasim
29. • Sayyid Shihabuddin Ahmad
30. • Sayyid Ali Hashimi
31. • Sayyid Ahmad Qadiri Habib Hamvi
32. • Sultan Ibrahim Shah Bukhari
33. • Shah Abdul Karim Bulri
34. • Sayyid Jalal Shah
35. • Sayyid Abdul Quddus Shah
36. • Sayyid Habibullah Shah (known as "Shah Habib")
37. • Shah Abdul Latif Bhittai

The Qadiri Silsilah of the family of Bhittai began with Shah Abdul Karim Bulri's bay'ah to a Qadiri sage and Saint, "Sultan Ibrahim Shah Bukhari". It becomes clear that after this bay'ah to Sultan Ibrahim Shah Bukhari, the family remained Qadiri onwards.

== Genealogy ==
Bhittai's genealogy goes back to Musa al-Kazim. The Sayyids of Matiari (Sadaat Matiari) descend from Syed Haider Ali whose ancestors migrated from Herat sometime around the Timurid era, Syed Haider Ali initially settled in Hala, Sindh but his descendants migrated to Matiari predominantly, during the period of settlement in Matiari, the Sayyids of Matiari divided into 4 branches (due to rivalry and disputes), namely: Jarar Pota, Baqeel Pota, Moosa Pota, Moeen Pota.

Bhittai and his ancestor Shah Abdul Karim Bulri belonged to the Jararpota Branch of the Sayyids of Matiari, this branch also produced many other holy men and Saints.

His genealogy is as follows:

1. • Caliph Ali ibn Abi Talib
2. • Imam Husayn
3. • Imam Ali Zayn al-Abidin
4. • Imam Muhammad Baqir
5. • Imam Ja'far as-Sadiq
6. • Imam Musa al-Kazim
7. • Sayyid Ja'far ibn Musa
8. • Sayyid Hussain al-Akbari
9. • Sayyid Ali Jawari Shah
10. • Sayyid Ibrahim Shah
11. • Sayyid Hussain Shah
12. • Sayyid Yousuf Shah
13. • Sayyid Ali Shah
14. • Sayyid Hussain Shah
15. • Sayyid Muhammad Shah
16. • Sayyid Mir Ali Shah
17. • Syed Haider Ali Shah (moved to Hala)
18. • Syed Mir Ali Shah II
19. • Syed Sharafdin Shah
20. • Syed Jamal Muhammad Shah
21. • Syed Haji Shah
22. • Syed Hashim Shah
23. • Syed Abdul Momin Shah
24. • Syed Laal Muhammad Shah
25. • Syed Shah Abdul Karim Bulri
26. • Syed Jalal Shah
27. • Syed Abdul Quddus Shah
28. • Syed Habib Shah
29. • Shah Abdul Latif Bhittai

== Legacy ==
Bhittai is regarded as the greatest Sufi poet of the Sindhi language and the national poet of Sindh. According to the orientalist Annemarie Schimmel, he is "The most outstanding master of popular Sufi poetry in Pakistan." According to Seyyed Hossein Nasr, Bhittai's Risalo has been compared with Rumi's Mathnawi, and Bhittai represents "direct emanations of Rūmī's spirituality in the Indian world."

Every Thursday evening, Bhittai's poetry is sung by traditional musicians and dervishes at the shrine in a typical ecstatic style. The performance is commonly referred to as Shah jo Rag (Shah's music).

=== Among Hindus ===
He is also revered by Sindhi Hindu communities. During his lifetime, he had visited the Hinglaj Mata temple and also mentioned about the shrine in his poetry. The Sur Ramkali was composed by him is in reverence to the Hinglaj Mata and the visiting jogis. There is a legend that the Shah Abdul Latin Bhittai took on the arduous journey to visit the Hinglaj Mata Mandir to pay tribute to the Hinglaj Mata and offered milk to the Hinglaj Mata. It is also believed that after he offered the milk, the Hinglaj Mata appeared in front of him.

=== Popular culture ===
Bhittai's poetry is popular among the Sindhi people, including both Muslims and Hindus. Bhittai's own connections with Jogis and Sanyasis may have contributed to this. The folk tales narrated in the Surs of the Risalo are frequently recounted and sung to children.

Many anecdotes about Bhittai of a haigographical nature are famous among the locals. One such story holds that when he was being taught the alphabet, he refused to learn anything beyond the letter Alif for it signifies the name of God (Allah) and there is nothing of value beyond it. Another story of this kind asserts that his followers presented him a written copy of the Risalo, which he threw away in the nearby Kirar lake after having read it. When the followers protested, he allowed them to rewrite the entire Risalo by narrating it from his memory. His tomb is a popular pilgrimage site in Sindh.

=== Urs ===
The Urs, an annual commemoration of his death, occurs on 14 Safar, the second month of the Hijra calendar. The ceremony, which lasts for three days, features prayers, music, exhibitions, literary conferences, and horse races. People visit the shrine from all over the province. A 16-foot-high statue of Bhittai was erected in front of the Bhit Shah rest house on the occasion of his 274th Urs in 2017.

== See also ==
- Khawaja Muhammad Zaman of Luari
- Sachal Sarmast
- Shah Inayat Shaheed

== Bibliography ==
- Advani, K. B. (1970). Makers of Indian Literature: Shah Latif. New Delhi: Sahitya Akademi.
- Ahmed, Vaqar (10 April 2015). "Bhit Shah: After the dhamaal". Dawn. Archived from the original on 30 November 2020.
- Baqir, M. (1982). "ʿAbd-al-Laṭīf Bheṭāʾī". Encyclopaedia Iranica. Vol. 1. Encyclopædia Iranica Foundation.
- Baloch, Nabi Bakhsh (2010). Life and Thought of Shah Abdul Latif Bhittai. Translated by Umrani, Gul Muhammad. Karachi: Culture Department, Government of Sindh.
- Fatimi, S. Q. (2002). "Shah ʿAbd al-Laṭīf Ḇẖiṭāʾī and the East India Company". Islamic Studies. 41 (3): 495–505. JSTOR 20837213.
- Jotwani, Motilal (1986). Sufis of Sindh. New Delhi: Ministry of Information and Broadcasting, Government of India. ISBN 9788123023410.
- Khamisani, Amena (2012). The Risalo Of Shah Abdul Latif Bhitai.
- Lashari, Mubarak Ali; Awan, Muhammad Safeer (2014). "The Concept of Love: A Comparative Study of Maulana Rumi and Shah Abdul Latif Bhittai". 1st Mediterranean Interdisciplinary Forum on Social Sciences and Humanities, MISFS 2014, vol.2, 23–26 April 2014, Beirut, Lebanon. Vol. 2. Kocani: European Scientific Institute. pp. 52–59. ISBN 978-608-4642-21-3.
- Muhammad Yakoob Agha (1985). Shah Jo Risalo Alias Ganje Latif - Vol I.
- Nasr, Seyyed Hossein (1975). "Rūmī and the Sufi Tradition". In Chelkowski, Peter J. (ed.). The Scholar and the Saint: Studies in Commemoration of Abuʼl-Rayhan Al-Bīrūni and Jalal Al-Din Al-Rūmī. New York: New York University Press. pp. 169–185. ISBN 9780814713600.
- Saleem, Agha (2015). Melodies of Shah Abdul Lateef Bhittai.
- Schimmel, Annemarie (1975). Mystical Dimensions of Islam. Chapel Hill: The University of North Carolina Press. ISBN 978-0-8078-1271-6.
- Schimmel, Annemarie (1976). Pain and Grace: A Study of Two Mystical Writers of Eighteenth-Century Muslim India. Leiden: E. J. Brill. ISBN 9789004378544.
- Smith, Paul (2012). Shah Latif: Selected Poems. Victoria, AU: New Humanity Books, Book Heaven. ISBN 978-1480039933.
- Sorley, H. T. (1960). "Bhitāʾī". In Gibb, H. A. R.; Kramers, J. H.; Lévi-Provençal, E.; Schacht, J.; Lewis, B. & Pellat, Ch. (eds.). The Encyclopaedia of Islam, Second Edition. Volume I: A–B. Leiden: E. J. Brill. pp. 1194–1195. OCLC 495469456.
- Sorley, H. T. (1966) [1940]. Shah Abdul Latif of Bhit: His Poetry, Life and Times: A Study of Literary, Social and Economic Conditions in Eighteenth Century Sind. Karachi: Oxford University Press. ISBN 978-0196360294.
- Shackle, Christopher (2013). "ʿAbd al-Laṭīf". In Fleet, Kate; Krämer, Gudrun; Matringe, Denis; Nawas, John; Rowson, Everett (eds.). Encyclopaedia of Islam (3rd ed.). Brill Online. doi:10.1163/1573-3912_ei3_COM_24149. ISSN 1873-9830.
