= Jhok (Sindh) =

Pakistani town

Jhok جهوڪ(in Sindhi)
- Town
- Location within Sindh Location within Pakistan
- Coordinates: 24°48′27″N 68°19′12″E
- Country: Pakistan
- Province: Sindh
- District: Sujawal
- Taluka: Mirpur Bathoro
  - Summer (DST): UTC+5

Jhok or Jhok Shareef (Sindhi: جهوڪ) is a small town in district Sujawal, Sindh, Pakistan.

== Battle of Jhok ==
Jhok is also the home of Sufi Shah Inayat Shaheed, who battled against the Mughal Empire over the distribution of land and taxation among poor peasants (Harees) and thus was executed at the hands of Farrukhsiyar, then ruler of India.

== See also ==
- Shah Inayat Shaheed
