= Abdul Razzaq Gilani =

Persian Sunni Sufi theologian and jurist (1134–1207)

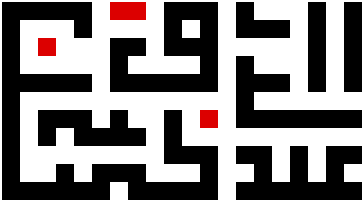
- Full name: Abdul Razzaq Gilani
- Born: 18 Zil Qa’dah 528 AH (9 September 1134)
- Fiqh: Muslim
- Birthplace: Baghdad, Iraq
- Died: 6 Shawwal 603 AH (7 May 1207)
- Place of Burial: Tomb of Ahmad ibn Hanbal, Baghdad, Iraq
- Father: Abdul-Qadir Gilani
- Son(s): Abu Saleh Gilani; Abu'l-Qasim Abdul Rahim Gilani; Abu Muhammad Isma'il Gilani; Abu Mohasin Fazal-e Allah Gilani; Jamal Allah Gilani; Abdul Aziz Saiduddin Gilani
- Khalifa: Abdul Jabbar Gilani
- Other Titles: Sheikh (Leader); Abdur Razzaq (Servant of the All-Provider); Al-Jilani (One Who Is from Gilan); Taj-ud-Din (Crown of the Religion); Abu Bakr (Father of Bakr); Sultan ul Faqr IV (The Fourth of the Seven Sacred Souls)

ʿAbd al-Razzāq b. ʿAbd al-Qādir al-Jīlānī (c. Dhu al-Qi'dah 528 AH – 6 Shawwal 603 AH/9 September 1134 – 7 May 1207), also known as Abū Bakr al-Jīlī or ʿAbd al-Razzāq al-Jīlānī (often simplified as Abdul-Razzaq Gilani) for short, or reverentially as Shaykh ʿAbd al-Razzāq al-Jīlānī by Sunni Muslims, was a Persian Sunni Muslim Hanbali theologian, jurist, traditionalist and Sufi mystic based in Baghdad. He received his initial training in the traditional Islamic sciences from his father, Abdul-Qadir Gilani (d. 1166), the founder of the Qadiriyya order of Sunni mysticism, prior to setting out "on his own to attend the lectures of other prominent Hanbali scholars" in his region. He is sometimes given the Arabic honorary epithet Tāj al-Dīn (Crown of the Religion) in Sunni tradition, due to his reputation as a mystic of the Hanbali school.

== Family ==
Abdul Razzaq Gilani was born on 9 September 1134 (18 Dhu al-Qadah 528 AH) in Baghdad. His father Abdul Qadir Gilani was regarded as a Hasani and Husayni Sayyid, i.e. his maternal and paternal ancestry included Hasan and Husayn ibn Ali, the sons of Ali, cousin of Muhammad, and Fatimah, Muhammad's daughter.

== Name ==
His full name is, Sultan-ul-Faqr IV Abu Bakr Taj-ud-Din Shaikh Syed Abdul Razzaq Jilani, the word Syed denotes his descent from Muhammad. The name Taj-ud-Din describes him as a "crown of religion" as he was the Mufti of Iraq. The phrase, al-Jilani refers to Gilan, the place of his father's birth and he carried the family name. However, Abdul Razzaq also carried the epithet, Sultan ul Faqr IV, referring to his spiritual status. His patronymic is Abu Bakr although rarely included as part of his name.

== Ancestry ==
According to traditional genealogical accounts, the lineage of Shaykh Abdul Razzaq Gilani is traditionally traced through his father, Abdul Qadir Gilani, Abu Salih Musa Jangi Dost, followed by Abdullah, Yahya al-Zahid, Muhammad, Dawud, Musa, Abdullah, Musa al-Jawn, Abdullah al-Mahd, Hasan al-Muthanna, Imam Hasan ibn Ali, and ultimately Imam Ali ibn Abi Talib.

== Life ==
He received religious and spiritual education directly from his father. He gained knowledge of hadith and Fiqh from his father, muhaddiths and a learned group of scholars. Being a Mufti of Iraq and due to his excellence as a jurist and scholar, he received the title of ‘Taj-ud-Din’ which literally means ‘the crown of religion’. He was known for his abstinence and renunciation spending most of his time in prayers and dhikr. He only met people to preach, turning many devotees into notable scholars and mystics.

Hafiz Imad-ud-Din Ibn-e-Kathir wrote: "Hazrat Abdul Razzaq was a perfectly accomplished mystic, ascetic and pious person. No one among the children of Shaikh Abdul Qadir Jillani was more learned and accomplished than he. He rejected worldly riches, status and high posts. He was least interested in worldly pleasures and always looked forward to the hereafter. He listened and learnt Hadith from many scholars and many people learnt Hadith from him".

=== The Incident of Celestial Beings ===
One day Shaikh Abdul Razzaq was present in the assembly of his father. Some mysterious and invisible beings were flying across the sky. When he feared what he saw, but Abdul Qadir Gilani told him not to worry as he was one of them. Hazrat Abu Zura'a Zahir Bin Al-Muqqadas Al-Dari was reported to have said:

“Today, a few such people are also present here who live across the mountain of Qa'f Qudas, their foot steps are in the air, their cloaks and the crowns of love of Allah on their heads are burning due to the extreme fire of Divine passion." Shaikh Abdul Razzaq was sitting close to the chair of Shaikh Abdul Qadir Gilani, listening to his words, he lifted his head and gazed at the sky. In a moment his cloak and turban started burning and he fainted. Abdul Qadir Gilani rose up and put the fire out with his hands saying "Oh Abdul Razzaq you are also one of them". Abu Zura'a says that "after the sermon I asked Shaikh Abdul Razzaq about the incident. He explained that when he gazed at the sky he saw some celestial spiritual people in the air whose cloaks and turbans were blazing with the extreme fire of Divine passion and they were circling and dancing in the air, they were thundering like clouds with the ache of Divine love. Seeing them he also felt the same".

== Descendants ==
Syed Khair ud Din noted that Abdul Razzaq Gillani had five sons;

- Syed Imaad ud deen Abu Saleh Abdullāh Nasr Jilani
- Syed Abul Qasim Abdul Raheem Jilani
- Syed Abu Muhammad Ismāeel Jilani
- Syed Abu Mohsin Fazlullāh Jilani
- Syed Jamalullāh Jilani (famous as Hayat Al Meer)

Syed Abdul Razzaq Jilani is the ancestor of the Jilanis of Afghanistan, Sindh, Khyber Pakhtunkhwa, Kashmir and in some other parts of India.

== Spiritual Sufi Order ==
The founder of the Qadiriyya, Abdul Qadir Gilani, was a respected scholar and preacher. Having been a pupil at the school (madrasa) of Abu Saeed Mubarak Makhzoomi he became the leader of this school after Makhzoomi's death in 1119. Being the new sheikh, he and his large family lived comfortably in the madrasa until his death in 1166, when his son, Abdul Razzaq, succeeded his father as the sheikh. The Qadiriyya flourished and remained an influential Sunni institution. By the end of the fifteenth century the Qadiriyya had distinct branches and had spread to present-day Morocco, Spain, Turkey, India, Ethiopia, Somalia and Mali.

On the Indian subcontinent, Sultan Bahoo spread the Qadiriyya order. His method of spreading the teachings of the Sufi doctrine of Faqr was through his Punjabi couplets and through his more than written works. He used the method of Dhikr and stressed that the way to reach Divinity was not through asceticism or excessive or lengthy prayers but through selfless love carved out of annihilation in Allah called Divine Love.

=== Spiritual Lineage ===
The saintly lineage of Faqr reached Syed Abdul Razzaq Gilani in the following order:

1. Muhammad
2. 'Alī bin Abī Ṭālib
3. al-Ḥasan al-Baṣrī
4. Habib al Ajami
5. Dawud Tai
6. Maruf Karkhi
7. Sirri Saqti
8. Junaid Baghdadi
9. Abu Bakr Shibli
10. Abdul Aziz bin Hars bin Asad Yemeni Tamimi
11. Abu Al Fazal Abdul Wahid Yemeni Tamimi
12. Mohammad Yousuf Abu al-Farah Tartusi
13. Abu-al-Hassan Ali Bin Mohammad Qureshi Hankari
14. Abu Saeed Mubarak Makhzoomi
15. Shaikh Abdul Qadir Gilani
16. Shaikh Abdul Razzaq Gilani

Shaikh Abdul Razzaq Gilani led the Qadiriyya order after his father and Shaikh Abdul Razzaq Gilani granted khilafat of Faqr to his grandson Abdul Jabbar Gilani.

== Death and Shrine ==
His death date is mostly noted to be 6 Shawwal 603 AH. His shrine is besides the shrine of Imam Ahmad Bin Hanbal near Baab-e-Harm in Baghdad. Few visitors and devotees are able to pay their regards due to the flow of river Tigris. He died on a Saturday, the 7 Shawwal 613 AH (some books mentioned 595 H, 1198 A.D) in Baghdad. A large crowd attended his funeral prayers, which were held also in many other places in Baghdad.

== Works ==
The following book is found to be Shaikh Abdul Razzaq’s work:

- Jala-ul-Khawatir : "(The Removal of Cares)"

== See also ==
- Ibn Arabi
- List of Sufis
