= Index of Sufism-related articles =

A list of topics related to the topic of Sufism.

== A ==
- Abdus Salaam ibn Mishish
- Abou Ben Adhem
- Abu Al Fazal Abdul Wahid Yemeni Tamimi
- Abu al-Hasan al-Shadhili
- Abul Hasan Hankari
- Abusaeid Abolkheyr
- Abu Saeed Mubarak Makhzoomi
- Ahl-e Haqq
- Ak Tagh
- Al-Hallaj
- Al-Khidr
- Ali Hajweri
- Ashraf Jahangir Semnani
- Farid al-Din Attar

== B ==
- Badawiyyah
- Bektashi
- Bholoo Shah
- Bulleh Shah
- François Bernier
- Sufi Barkat Ali

== C ==
- Chishti Order

== D ==
- Dervish

== E ==
- Yunus Emre
- Muhammad Emin Er

== F ==
- Fakir
- Fakhruddin 'Iraqi
- Fareeduddin Ganjshakar
- Fariduddin Attar
- Fourth Way
- Fassi
- Futuwa

== G ==
- Gülen movement

== H ==
- Henry Wilberforce-Clarke
- Eric Hermelin
- Hidayat Inayat Khan
- History of Sufism

== I ==
- Ibn Arabi
- Inayat Khan
- Idries Shah

== J ==
- Jamali (artist)
- Jami
- Junayd of Baghdad, founder of Junaidia order

== K ==
- Kashf
- Kashf ul Mahjoob
- Khalwa
- Khalwati order
- Knowledge by presence

== L ==
- List of famous Sufis
- List of tariqas

== M ==
- Ameer Muhammad Akram Awan
- Madurai Maqbara
- Makrifat
- Marifat
- Maudood Chishti
- Maulana Syed Muhammad Zauqi Shah
- Mohammad Yousaf Abu al-Farah Tartusi
- Moinuddin Chishti

== N ==
- Naqshbandi Sufi Order
- Naqshbandia Owaisiah
- Nimatullahi Sufi order
- Noorbakshi Sufi order
- Nizamuddin Auliya

== O ==
- Ömer Faruk Tekbilek

== P ==
- François Pétis de la Croix

== Q ==
- Qadiriyya
- Qawwali

== R ==
- Rumi, Jalāl ad-Dīn Muḥammad
- Riaz Ahmed Gohar Shahi

== S ==
- Sachal Sarmast
- Safaviya
- Salik
- Sema
- Shadhili
- Shah Abdul Latif Bhittai
- Abdul Qadir Jilani
- Shaikh Syed Abdul Razzaq Jilani
- Sufi metaphysics
- Sufi music
- Sufi philosophy
- Sufi poetry
- Sufi studies
- Sufi texts
- Sufi whirling
- Sufism
- Sufism in India
- Sufism in Jordan
- Sultan Bahoo
- Sumer Dargah
- Syed Abdul Rehman Jilani Dehlvi

== T ==
- Tajalli
- Tariqa
- Tazkiah
- Tijaniyyah

== U ==
- Urs
- Uwais al-Qarni
- Uwaisi

== V ==
- Vatul

== W ==
- The Whirling Dervishes
- Wali Kirani

== Z ==
- Zahed
- Zahediyeh
