= Sachal Sarmast =

Sindhi Sufi mystic and poet (1739–1827)

- سچل سرمست
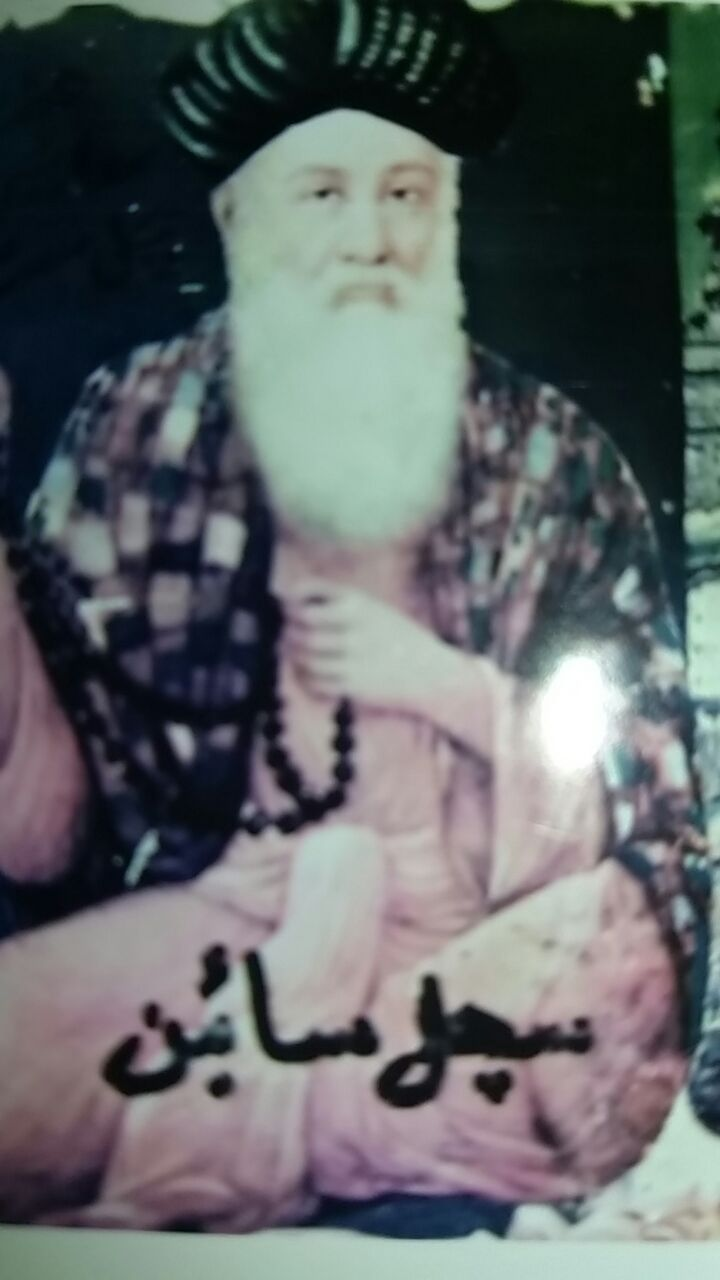
- Title: Hazrat Faqir; Attar-e-Sindh; Mansur-i-Sani; Shair-i-Haft-Zuban

Personal life
- Born: Abdul Wahab Farooqi c. 1739 CE Daraza, Kalhora Sindh (present-day Sindh, Pakistan)
- Died: 1825 (aged 85–86) Daraza, Talpur Sindh (present-day Sindh, Pakistan)
- Flourished: Talpur period
- Parent: Khwaja Salahuddin Farooqui (father)
- Notable work(s): "Sachal jo Kalam, Diwan-i-Ashkar, Masnavi-Namas, Diwan-i-Khudai, Nukta-i-Tasawwuf"
- Other names: Sacho Sarmast, Shah Daraz, Ishq jo Otar, Sultan ul-Arifeen
- Pen name: Sachal

Religious life
- Religion: Islam
- Denomination: Sunni
- Order: Shah Darazi (Silsilah of Qadiriyyah)
- Philosophy: Sufism
- Lineage: Farooqui
- Initiation: into Shah Darazi Tariqa (Branch of Qadiriyyah) by Khwaja Abdul Haq Farooqui

Senior posting
- Teacher: Khwaja Abdul Haq Farooqui
- Disciple of: Khwaja Abdul Haq Farooqui
- Disciples: Fakir Nanik Yousuf, Muhammad Saleh Qadri, Muhammad Salah Jeho, Guhram Jatoi, Bedil
- Influenced by: Shah Abdul Latif Bhittai; Jalal ad-Din Muhammad Rumi; Mansur al-Hallaj; Bayazid Bistami; Sarmad Kashani
- Influenced: Qadir Bux Bedil; Allama I. I. Kazi; Nabi Bux Baloch; Shaikh Ayaz; Syed Ghulam Murtaza Shah

Sachal Sarmast or Sacho Sarmast (Sindhi: سچو سرمست; c. 1739 – 1827), was an 18th and 19th century Sindhi Sufi mystic and poet. He is regarded as an important figure in the Sindhi literature.

== Biography ==
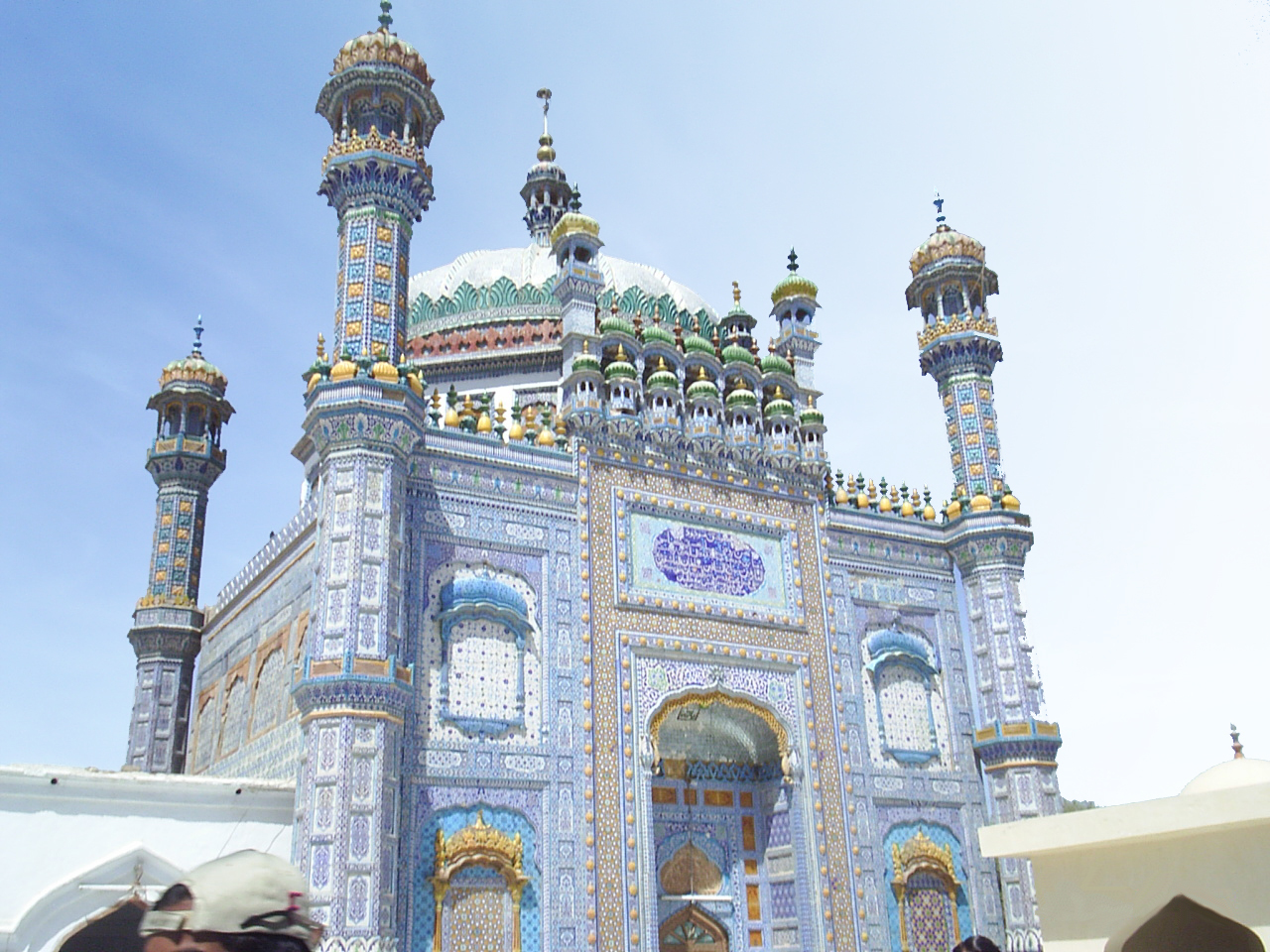
Shrine of Sachal Sarmast

Sachal Sarmast was a descendant of the second Rashidun caliph Umar and wrote poetry in seven languages: Sindhi, Siraiki, Persian, Urdu, Balochi, Punjabi and Arabic. He lived during the Kalhoro and Talpur rule in Sindh. He was born in 1152 H (AD 1739) in Daraza, near Ranipur.

He was named Abdul Wahab, after his great-grandfather. His truthful nature earned him the names Sacho, or Sachal, which means, "The truth-speaker." He was also named Sachedino, which means "Gifted by The True One."

He was also called "Hafiz Darazi", because of his memorization of Quran and love for his home of Daraza. His famous name of Sachal Sarmast means, "Truth-speaker intoxicated in Allah's love".

His native home of Shah Daraza was originally an estate for rulers of the state, but later became a prominent Sufi base due to the mysticism of the Farooqui mystics. It was known as "Dar-i-Raaz" or "Gate of Sufi Mysteries."

== Childhood ==
Sachal was six years old during the time his father Khwaja Salahuddin Farooqui died, and his grandfather Khwaja Muhammad Hafiz Farooqui then took care of him, then his uncle Khwaja Abdul Haq I, who later became his murshid and father-in-law began taking care of him. Khwaja Abdul Haq I appointed Hafiz Abdullah, one of his murids, as Sachal's tutor. He taught him the Quran and theology. At the age of 12, he demonstrated a lot of knowledge of theology. He liked solitude. He liked to be alone often like a dervish.

He was around the age of seven when the famous poet and Sufi, Shah Abdul Latif Bhittai came to Daraza and prophecised of Sachal unveiling Sufi mysteries when he is older, in the following words: "This boy shalt take off the lid I have put on the pot."

== Silsila of Shah Darazi Tariqa ==
=== Silsila reaching modern-day custodians of the shrine ===
1. Hazrat Imam Ali,
2. Hazrat Imam Husayn,
3. Hazrat Imam Zayn al-Abidin,
4. Hazrat Imam al-Baqir,
5. Hazrat Imam Jafar,
6. Hazrat Imam Musa,
7. Hazrat Imam Riza,
8. Hazrat Sh. Ma'ruf Kharki,
9. Hazrat Sh. Abu Hassan Sari Sakti,
10. Hazrat Sh. Junaid al-Baghdadi,
11. Hazrat Sh. Abu Bakr al-Shibli,
12. Hazrat Sh. Abu Fazal ibn Awahid,
13. Hazrat Sh. Abu al-Farah Tartussi,
14. Hazrat Sh. Ali ibn Muhammad Yusuf Hankari,
15. Hazrat Sh. Abu Saeed Faruqi,
16. Hazrat Sh. Abdul Qadir al-Jilani,
17. Hazrat Sh. Abdul Qadir Suhrawardi,
18. Hazrat Sh. Amaududdin Ilyas,
19. Hazrat Sh. Najamuddin Kubra,
20. Hazrat Sh. Majeeduddin Baghdadi,
21. Hazrat Sh. Ahmed,
22. Hazrat Sh. Nuruddin Kubrai,
23. Hazrat Sh. Muhammad al-Hassan,
24. Hazrat Sh. Muhammad,
25. Hazrat Sh. Yahya Madani,
26. Hazrat Sh. Ubaidullah,
27. Hazrat Khwaja Muhammad Hafiz Farooqui,
28. Hazrat Khwaja Abdul Haq I,
29. Hazrat Sakhi Qabool Muhammad I,
30. Hazrat Khwaja Nazar Muhammad,
31. Hazrat Khwaja Najamuddin,
32. Hazrat Sakhi Qabool Muhammad II,
33. Hazrat Khwaja Sahib Dino,
34. Hazrat Sakhi Qabool Muhammad III,
35. Hazrat Khwaja Abdul Haq II,
36. Sakhi Qabool Muhammad IV

=== Silsila reaching Sachal ===
1. Hazrat Imam Ali,
2. Hazrat Imam Husayn,
3. Hazrat Imam Zayn al-Abidin,
4. Hazrat Imam al-Baqir,
5. Hazrat Imam Jafar,
6. Hazrat Imam Musa,
7. Hazrat Imam Riza,
8. Hazrat Sh. Ma'ruf Kharki,
9. Hazrat Sh. Abu Hassan Sari Sakti,
10. Hazrat Sh. Junaid al-Baghdadi,
11. Hazrat Sh. Abu Bakr al-Shibli,
12. Hazrat Sh. Abu Fazal ibn Awahid,
13. Hazrat Sh. Abu al-Farah Tartussi,
14. Hazrat Sh. Ali ibn Muhammad Yusuf Hankari,
15. Hazrat Sh. Abu Saeed Faruqi,
16. Hazrat Sh. Abdul Qadir al-Jilani,
17. Hazrat Sh. Abdul Qadir Suhrawardi,
18. Hazrat Sh. Amaududdin Ilyas,
19. Hazrat Sh. Najamuddin Kubra,
20. Hazrat Sh. Majeeduddin Baghdadi,
21. Hazrat Sh. Ahmed,
22. Hazrat Sh. Nuruddin Kubrai,
23. Hazrat Sh. Muhammad al-Hassan,
24. Hazrat Sh. Muhammad,
25. Hazrat Sh. Yahya Madani,
26. Hazrat Sh. Ubaidullah,
27. Hazrat Khwaja Muhammad Hafiz Farooqui,
28. Hazrat Khwaja Abdul Haq I,
29. Hazrat Sachal Sarmast

== Sachal's appearance and dress ==
Sachal's height was average, he had a wide forehead with a "enlightened" face. His eyes were dewy and his face always seemed in somberness or grief. He dressed humbly, he wore a White shirt. He also wore blue trousers. He wore a green turban and wore wooden sandals, he would go barefoot on long strolls sometimes.

== Marriage ==
Khwaja Abdul Haq I got him married to his daughter, Sachal's cousin who lived two years after the marriage and died childless. He did not marry again after this.

== Sufi thought ==
The second Sufi master of the Faruqis of Daraza was Khwaja Mian Abdul Haq Farooqui who was the murshid and guide of Sachal Sarmast. Sachal has said about his Murshid Khwaja Abdul Haq in his following lines:

"If vou wish to be aware of the Devine Secrets, come with a sincere heart to Shah Daraza. Here is the murshid Abdul Haq who knows all mysteries, and has shown me the path love and will also reveal it to you."

He was a strict man when it came to religion. He adhered to all religious rites and prayers, and he urged others to do the same, he said to others to offer their prayers five times daily in the mosque, to not miss the Friday prayer, to fast in the month of Ramadan and to be pious; as well as to recite the Qur'an or hear it from others.

His whole life was quite simple. He did not hunt animals. He did not take any intoxicants or alcohol, and he believed that the greatest intoxicant was Allah's love which he has described in his poetry as a "Jaam" or "Wine".

== Poetry ==
Sachal was an enthusiast of Sufi poetry and music. Hearing Sufi poems would cause him to go into a state of wajd and dance, tears would also come from his eyes. The Khwaja of Daraza put 2 men to write down his poetry whenever he went into wajd and sang, if they missed anything and asked him to repeat his lines, Sachal would say, "I did not sing; He Himself sang."

He expresses the idea of Allah being the ultimate oneness and only in some of his poems such as: "He is, You are not, Lose your self, And jump into the Sea of Unity."

He was a complete lover and devotee of the Companions of the Prophet and has condemned those who curse and disassociate from them in his famous poem, "Mahi Yaar di Gharoli". He expresses this in the following lines:

"Abu Bakr, Shah Umar, Uthman, Ali, pure Imams of the believers, Of the liege of the Arabs, I am a servant."

"The Rafidhi can never be a Hafiz, Nor can he ever become a Wali, My feelings to them are pure poison."

"The one who curses and disassociates (from the companions), The companions are free of what he accuses them, I kiss the dirt of the door of the dear companions."

Sachal talks of his tariqah's silsilah's origin being Pir Ubaidallah Shah Jilani who is also mentioned in their silsilah:

"Shah Ubaidallah Jilani! He gave us the honor of spiritual guidance, I am born of the city of Daraza!"

Sachal also praises the revered Islamic and Sufi figure, Abdul Qadir Jilani who is also the origin of his tariqah:

"Pir of Pirs, Hazrat Miraan! Upon whose name, chains break! Perfect Murshid, his name I repeat!"

== Death ==
He was healthy in his life because of a simple diet and fasting. In the last three days of his life he was in his room. Only the sounds of music and dance were heard by attendants. He died on the 14th of Ramadan 1242 A. H., 1825 AD.

== Successors ==
The current sajjada nashin of Sachal Sarmast's shrine is Khwaja Abdul Haq III Farooqui.

== Urs of Sachal ==
An annual three-day urs, or festival commemorating the death anniversary of Sachal Sarmast is held at Daraza, beginning on the 13th day of Ramadan, including a literary conference and musical concerts based on his poetry.
