= Sultan Bahu =

Punjabi poet, Sufi mystic, and scholar (1630–1691)

- سُلطان باہوُ
- Born: 17 January 1630; Shorkot, Subah of Lahore, Mughal Empire
- Died: 1 March 1691 (aged 61); Jhang, Subah of Lahore, Mughal Empire
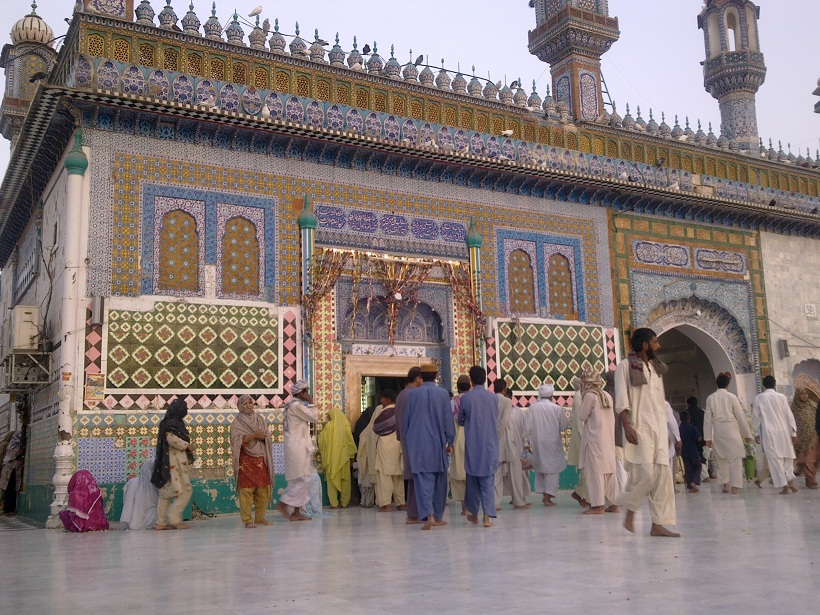
- Burial place: Shrine of bahu
- Citizenship: Mughal Empire
- Known for: Sufi poetry
- Successor: Syed Mohammad Abdullah Shah Madni Jilani
- Parents: Bayazid Muhammad (father); Mai Rasti-Quds-Sara (mother)
- Website: https://www.sultanbahoo.net/

Sultan Bahu (Note: Punjabi: سُلطان باہُو, ਸੁਲਤਾਨ ਬਾਹੂ) (also spelled as Sultan Bahoo; Punjabi: [sʊltaːn baːɦuː]; 17 January 1630 – 1 March 1691), was a Punjabi Muslim poet, Sufi, scholar, and historian of the 17th century. Renowned for his mystical poetry, he was active during the reigns of Mughal emperors Shah Jahan and Aurangzeb.

Little is known about Bahu's life, other than what was written in a hagiography called Manaqib-i Sultani seven generations after Bahu's own time. According to these records, he was born in Shorkot into the Awan tribe. He was son of Bayazid Muhammad, an officer in the Mughal Army, and Rasti. He belonged to Qadiri Sufi order, and started the mystic tradition known as Sarwari Qadiri.

More than forty books on Sufism are attributed to him (mostly written in Persian), largely dealing with specialised aspects of Islam and Islamic mysticism. However, it was his Punjabi poetry which had popular appeal and earned him lasting fame. His verses are sung in many genres of Sufi music, including qawwali and kafi, and tradition has established a unique style of singing his couplets.

== Education ==
Sultan Bahu's first teacher was his mother, Mai Rasti. She pushed him to seek spiritual guidance from Shah Habib Gilani.

Around 1668, Sultan Bahu moved to Delhi for further training under the guidance of Syed Abdul Rehman Jilani Dehlvi, a notable Sufi saint of the Qadiriyya order, and thereafter returned to Punjab where he spent the rest of his life.

== Literary works ==
The exact number of books written by Sultan Bahu is not known, but it is assumed to be at least one hundred. Forty of them are on Sufism and Islamic mysticism. Most of his writings are in the Persian language except Abyat-e-Bahu which is in Punjabi verse.

Only the following books written by Sultan Bahu can be found today:

- Abyat e Bahu
- Risala e Ruhi
- Sultan ul Waham
- Nur ul Khuda
- Aql e Baidar
- Mahq ul Faqr
- Aurang e Shahi
- Jami ul Israr
- Taufiq e Hidayat
- Kalid Tauheed
- Ain ul Faqr
- Israr e Qadri
- Kaleed e Jannat
- Muhqam ul Faqr
- Majlis un Nabi
- Muftah ul Arifeen
- Hujjat ul Israr
- Kashf ul Israar
- Mahabat ul Israr
- Ganj ul Israr
- Fazl ul Liqa
- Dewaan e Bahu

== Spiritual lineage ==
Sultan Bahu refers to Abdul Qadir Jilani as his spiritual master, even though Jilani died long before the birth of Sultan Bahu. However, most Sufis maintain that Abdul Qadir Jilani has a special role in the mystic world and that all orders and saints are always indebted to him directly or indirectly in some way. Thus, whilst referring to Jilani's Qadiriyya tradition, Sultan Bahu has left an offshoot of his own which he named Sarwari Qadiri.

According to tradition, the lineage reaches Sultan Bahu as follows:

1. Muhammad
2. Ali ibn Abi Talib
3. Hasan al Basri
4. Habib al Ajami
5. Dawud Tai
6. Maruf Karkhi
7. Sirri Saqti
8. Junaid Baghdadi
9. Abu Bakr Shibli
10. Abdul Aziz bin Hars bin Asad Yemeni Tamimi
11. Abu Al Fazal Abdul Wahid Yemeni Tamimi
12. Mohammad Yousaf Abu al-Farah Tartusi
13. Abu-al-Hassan Ali Bin Mohammad Qureshi Hankari
14. Abu Saeed Mubarak Makhzoomi
15. Abdul Qadir Jilani
16. Abdul Razzaq Jilani
17. Abdul Jabbar Jilani
18. Syed Mohammad Sadiq Yahya
19. Najm-ud-Din Burhan Puri
20. Abdul Fattah
21. Abdul Sattar
22. Abdul Baqqa
23. Abdul Jaleel
24. Syed Abdul Rehman Jilani Dehlvi
25. Sultan Bahu

The tradition has been continued to this day by Sultan Bahu's successors.

== Shrine ==
The dargah (shrine) of Sultan Bahu is located in Garh Maharaja, Punjab. It was originally built on Bahu's grave site until the Chenab River changed its course causing the need to relocate twice and as witnessed by those present at the time of relocation, claims that his body was still intact at the time. It is a popular Sufi shrine, and the annual Urs festival commemorating his death is celebrated there with great fervour on the first Thursday of Jumada al-Thani month. People come from far-off places to join the celebrations.

Sultan Bahu also used to hold an annual Urs to commemorate the martyrs of Karbala from the first to the tenth day of the month of Muharram. This tradition continues to this day and every year, and thousands of pilgrims visit the shrine during this period.

== See also ==
- List of famous Sufis
- Sufism in Pakistan
- Garh Maharaja
