= Abul Hasan Hankari =

Iraqi Muslim philosopher, theologian and jurist (c.1018–1093)

Abul Hasan Ali bin Mohammad Qureshi Hashmi Hakari ا بوالحسن ہنکاری
- Title: Shaikh ul Islam

Personal life
- Born: Abu al-Hassan Ali Bin Mohammad Qureshi Hashmi Hankari; 409 AH, c. 1018 CE Hakar village, Mosul Iraq
- Died: 1st Moharram 486 AH, 1 February 1093 CE Baghdad
- Era: Islamic Golden Age
- Region: Hakar (Mosul), Iraq; Abbasid Caliphate (Baghdad)/(Jerusalem)/(Damascus)
- Main interest(s): Sufism, theology, philosophy, logic, Islamic jurisprudence

Religious life
- Religion: Islam
- Denomination: Sunni Islam
- Jurisprudence: Shafi'i
- Creed: Ash'ari

Muslim leader
- Influenced by: His Murshid Mohammad Yousaf Abu al-Farah Tartusi
- Influenced: His Khalifah and heir Abu Saeed Mubarak Makhzoomi others: Al-Ghazali Avicenna Imam Behqi Abd al-Qahir al-Jurjani Abu al-Hassan al-Kharaqani

Abul Hasan Hakari (Arabic: ا بوالحسن ہنکاری) Abu Al Hasan Ali Bin Mohammad Qureshi Hashmi Hakari Harithi (born in 409 Hijri (c.1018 CE), in the town of Hankar), town of Mosul (city of northern Iraq, some 400 km north of Baghdad), died 1st Moharram 486 AH (1 February 1093 CE), in Baghdad, was a Muslim mystic also renowned as one of the most influential Muslim scholar, philosopher, theologian and jurist of his time and Sufi based in Hankar.

== Biography ==
He was educated by his father. He was a man acquainted with the hidden secrets and was known for his Karamats. He would fast for 3 consecutive days and complete 2 whole Quran between Isha and Tahajjud. He devoutly stayed in worship day and night. He had the habit of practising excessive religious exercises and recitals. He travelled across many countries to get religious knowledge. From Rome to Spain to Harmain, etc. he met numerous scholars and shaikhs from whom he began to receive instruction in Fiqh and muhaddiths from whom he memorised hadith by heart. He even met Shaikh Abu al-Layla Misri and heard hadith from him. All Hafiz e Quran (memorisers of Quran), Muhaddiths (narrators of Hadiths), Qaries (reciters of Quran with correct accent and pronunciation) are given a chain of incredible narrators linking to the Islamic prophet Muhammad. He gained exoteric and esoteric education from the most prominent and influential scholars of his time. He even got spiritual beneficence from Bayazid Bastami. After sometime, he went back to his homeland. Hence, the people around him gave him a lot of respect and he gained fame. He earned the title of Shaikh-ul-Islam due to the unmatched religious knowledge and beneficence of the time. Countless seekers of Allah benefitted from him as he was an Arif Kamil. He was the Imam of Shariat and Tariqat of his time. He wore the khirqa of khilafat from Muhammad Yousaf Abu al-Farah Tartusi who was the Qutb of that time. The period between the 11th and 14th centuries is considered to be the "Golden Age" of Arabic and Islamic philosophy by the Stanford Encyclopedia of Philosophy, he has an important role to play in it as he was one of those early Sufis who brought logic into the Islamic seminary.

== Ancestral lineage ==
Abul Hasan Hakari bin Sheikh Ahmed Muhammad Hakari bin Sheikh Muhammad Jafar Mehmood Hakari bin Sheikh Yusaf bin Sheikh Jafar urf Muhammad bin Umar bin Abdul Wahab bin Abu Sufyan bin Al-Harith bin Abdul Mutalib bin Hashim bin Abd Manaf ibn Qusai. His descendants later spread to the State of Bahawalpur, Azalah, Jhang, Gujranwala, Sialkot, Faisalabad, Lahore, Rahim yar Khan etc.

=== Saintly Lineage ===
The spiritual heritage of Faqr was passed on to Abul Hasan Hankari though the silsila of Junaid al-Baghdadi which makes him a spiritual descendant of the Islamic prophet Mohammad in the following order:

1. Muhammad
2. 'Alī bin Abī Ṭālib
3. al-Ḥasan al-Baṣrī
4. Habib al Ajami
5. Dawud Tai
6. Maruf Karkhi
7. Sirri Saqti
8. Junaid Baghdadi
9. Abu Bakr Shibli
10. Abdul Aziz bin Hars bin Asad Yemeni Tamimi
11. Abu Al Fazal Abdul Wahid Yemeni Tamimi
12. Mohammad Yousaf Abu al-Farah Tartusi
13. Abu-al-Hassan Ali Bin Mohammad Qureshi Hankari

The Murshid of Abdul Qadir Jilani, Abu Saeed Mubarak Makhzoomi spent 18 years at the service of Abul Hasan Hankari and led the silsila after him.

== Students ==
Abu Saeed Mubarak Makhzoomi was the khalifa-e-akbar (senior spiritual successor) while Tahir (son of Abul Hasan Hankari) was khalifa-e-asghar (junior spiritual successor).

== Influenced ==
Abul Hasan Hankari influenced a lot of scholars and Islamic scholars alike most of whom have a notable name in the history such as:

1. Hujjat-ul-Islam Imam Mohammad Ghazali Tusi (505 H/1111 CE);
2. Hafiz Darqatni;
3. Sartaj Nehyan Ibn Jani;
4. Sartaj Bilfar Badee
5. Qadwari Shaikh Al-Hanafia (428H);
6. Avicenna (427H);
7. Imam Behqi;
8. Abd al-Qahir al-Jurjani (471H);
9. Shaikh Abu al-Hassan al-Kharaqani.

== Death ==
He died on 1st Moharram 486 H, 1 February 1093 CE during the Abbasid Caliphate. His shrine is the village of Hankar, Baghdad.

== See also ==
- Shaikh Abdul Qadir Jilani
- Mohammad Yousaf Abu al-Farah Tartusi
- Mir Sayyid Ali Hamadani
- Sultan Bahoo
- Islamic Golden Age
