= Abu Saeed Mubarak Makhzoomi =

11th-century Sufi Muslim saint

Mystic
- Born: 12 Rajab 403 H or 26 January 1013; Hankar, Mosul
- Died: 11 Rabī’ al-Thānī 513 H or 26 July 1119; Baghdad
- Venerated in: Islam
- Preceded by: Abul Hasan Hankari
- Major shrine: Baab-e-Azj, Baghdad

Abu Saeed Mubarak Makhzoomi (Arabic: ابو سعید مبارك المخزومي) (26 January 1013 ― 26 July 1119), known also as Mubarak bin Ali Makhzoomi and Abu Saeed and Abu Sa'd al-Mubarak (rarely known as Qazi Abu Sa'd al-Mubarak al-Mukharrimi) was a Sufi saint as well as a Muslim mystic and Traditionalist. He was an Islamic theologian and a Hanbali jurist based in Baghdad, Iraq. Abu Saeed was his patronym.

== Biography ==
Abu Saeed Mubarak Makhzoomi was born in Hankar (the land of his Murshid) on 12th Rajab 403 Hijri (26 January 1013 A.D) but spent most of his life in Makhzum, a small town in Baghdad. He established Baab-ul-Azj, the famous madrasa of Baghdad whom he later handed over to his disciple and khalifah, Shaikh Abdul Qadir Jilani. Abu Saeed Mubarak Makhzoomi was also appointed as the chief justice but he preferred to renounce the worldly life. Thereafter he led his life as a mystic and devoted his time to the dhikr of Allah. He died on 11th Rabī’ al-Thānī 513 Hijri (26 July 1119 A.D) and was buried in Baab-ul-Azj, Baghdad.

== Sufi tradition ==
Abu Saeed Mubarak Makhzoomi was a renowned Imam of Fiqh in his era. He followed the Hanbali school of thought. He was the Murshid and most proficient spiritual guide of Shaikh Abdul Qadir Jilani amongst teachers. He often said:

“I invested Shaikh Abdul Qadir Jilani with a robe khirqa and he invested me too with a robe. We attained blessings from each other.”

=== Spiritual lineage ===
The spiritual lineage of Faqr reaches Abu Saeed Mubarak Makhzoomi from Muhammad in the following order:

1. Mohammad
2. 'Alī bin Abī Ṭālib
3. al-Ḥasan al-Baṣrī
4. Habib al Ajami
5. Dawud Tai
6. Maruf Karkhi
7. Sirri Saqti
8. Junaid Baghdadi, founder of the Junaidia order
9. Abu Bakr Shibli
10. Abdul Aziz bin Hars bin Asad Yemeni Tamimi
11. Abu Al Fazal Abdul Wahid Yemeni Tamimi
12. Mohammad Yousaf Abu al-Farah Tartusi
13. Abu-al-Hassan Ali Bin Mohammad Qureshi Hankari
14. Abu Saeed Mubarak Makhzoomi

Abu Saeed Mubarak Makhzoomi conferred khilafat upon Shaikh Abdul Qadir Jilani who continued the order by renaming it as Qadri order.

== Titles ==
1. QIBLA-E-SAALIKA (Destination of Wayfarers).

2. JAAMI ULOOM-E-MARIFAT (Collector of Gnosis of Allah).

== See also ==
- Qadiriyyah
- Abdul Qadir Jilani
