= Qadiri Order =

Sufi mystic order in Sunni Islam

Qadiri order
- الطريقة القادرية al-Ṭarīqa al-Qādiriyyah
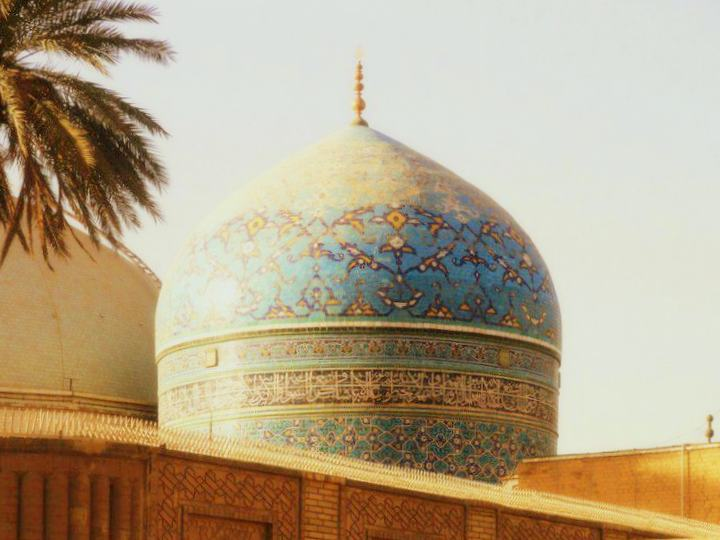
- The shrine of Abdul Qadir Gilani in Baghdad
- Abbreviation: Qādiriyyah
- Type: Sufi order
- Classification: Sunni Islam
- Region: Indian sub-continent, Middle East, Far East
- Founder: Abdul Qadir Gilani
- Origin: 12th century Abbasid Caliphate

The Qadiriyya (Arabic: القادرية) or the Qadiri order (Arabic: الطريقة القادرية, romanized: al-Ṭarīqa al-Qādiriyyah) is a Sunni Sufi order (tariqa) founded by Abdul Qadir Gilani (1077–1166, also transliterated Jilani), who was a Hanbali scholar from Gilan, Iran.

The order, with its many sub-orders, is widespread. Its members are present in India, Bangladesh, China, Turkey, Indonesia, Afghanistan, Pakistan, the Balkans, Russia, Palestine, as well as East, West and North Africa.

== History ==
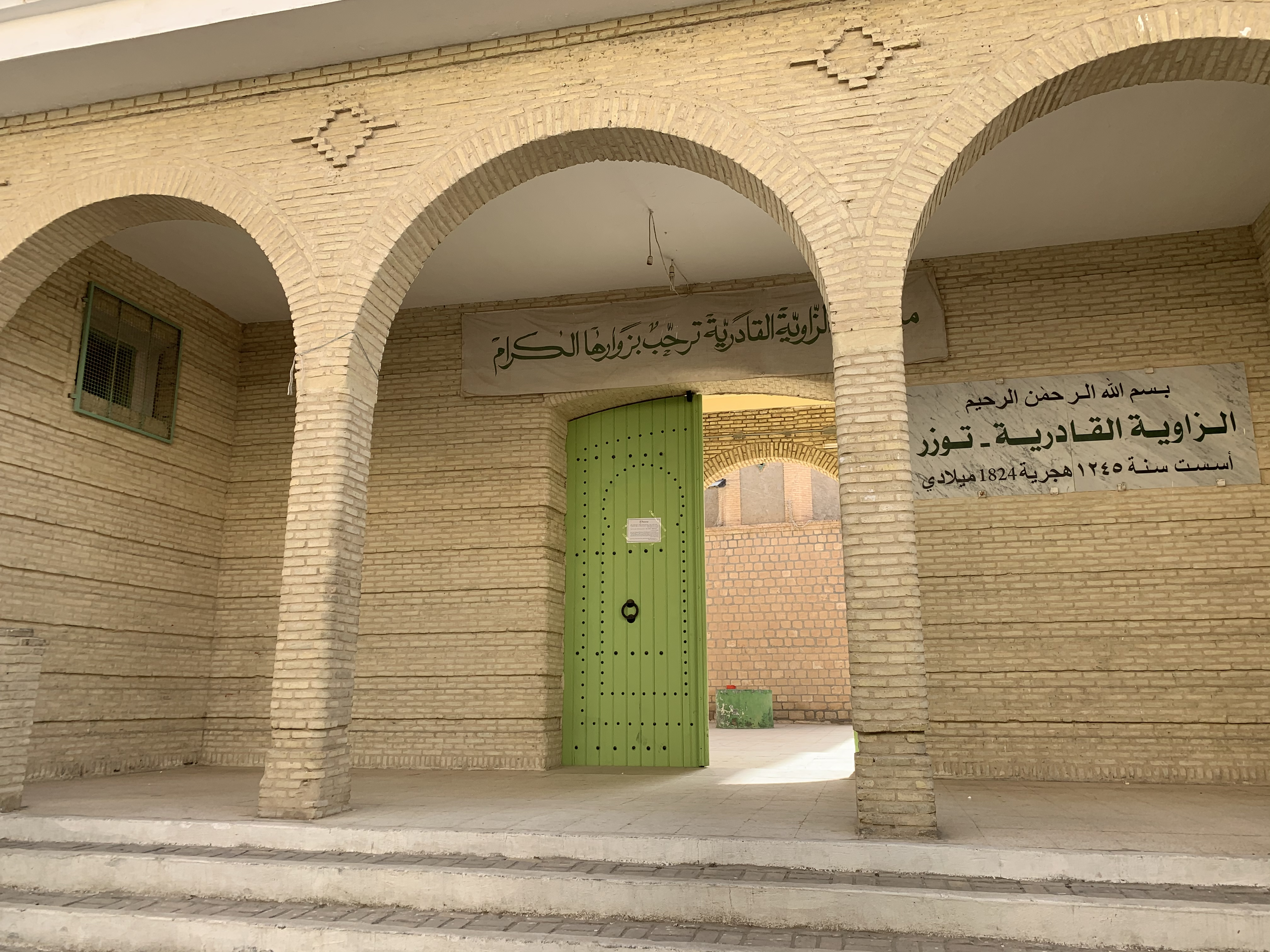
The Qadiriyya Zawiya (Sufi lodge) in Tozeur, Tunisia

Abdul Qadir Gilani, a Hanbali scholar and preacher, having been a pupil at the madrasa of Abu Saeed Mubarak, became the leader of the madrasa after Mubarak's death in 1119. Being the new Sheikh, he and his large family lived in the madrasa until his death in 1166, when his son, Abdul Razzaq, succeeded his father as Sheikh. Abdul Razzaq published a hagiography of his father, adding to his already established reputation as founder of a prestigious Sufi order.

The Qadiriyya flourished, surviving the Mongolian conquest of Baghdad in 1258, and remained an influential Sunni Sufi order. After the fall of the Abbasid Caliphate, the legend of Abdul Qadir Gilani was again found in many texts such as The Joy of the Secrets in Abdul Qadir's Mysterious Deeds (Bahjat al-Asrar fi ba'd manaqib 'Abd al-Qadir) attributed to Nur al-Din 'Ali al-Shattanufi, who taught that Abdul Qadir Gilani was the greatest saint within Islam, helping the Qadiri order flourish far beyond Baghdad.

By the end of the fifteenth century, the Qadiriyya had distinct sub-orders and had spread to Morocco, Spain, Turkey, India, Ethiopia, Somalia, and present-day Mali.

Khwaja Abdullah, a Sheikh of the Qadiriyya and a descendant of the Islamic prophet Muhammad, is reported to have entered China in 1674 and traveled the country preaching until his death in 1689. One of his students, Qi Jingyi Hilal al-Din, is said to have rooted Qadiri Sufism in China. He was buried in Linxia City, which became the center of the Qadiriyya in China.

Sultan Bahu contributed to the spread of the Qadiriyya in India. His method of spreading the teachings of the Sufi doctrine of Faqr was through his Punjabi couplets and other writings, which numbered more than 140.

Sheikh Sidi Ahmad al-Bakka'i of the Kunta family was born in the region of the Noun river, Akka, in Morocco. He established a Qadiri Zawiya or Sufi lodge in Walata. In the sixteenth century, his family spread across the Sahara to Timbuktu, Agades, Bornu, and Nigeria, and in the eighteenth century, large numbers of Kunta family members moved to the region of the middle of Niger where they established the village of Mabruk. Sidi al-Mukhtar al-Kunti (1728–1811) united the Kunta family's factions by successful negotiation, and established an extensive confederation. Under his influence, the Maliki school of Islamic law was reinvigorated and the Qadiriyya order spread throughout Mauritania, the middle Niger region, Guinea, the Ivory Coast, Futa Toro, and Futa Jallon. Kunta settlements in the Senegambian region became centers of Muslim teaching.

Sheikh Usman dan Fodio (1754-1817) from Gobir popularized the Qadiri teachings in Nigeria. He was well educated in classical Islamic science, philosophy, and theology. He also became a revered religious thinker. In 1789, a vision led him to believe he had the power to work miracles, and to teach his own mystical wird, or litany. His litanies are still widely practiced and distributed in the Islamic world. Dan Fodio later had visions of Abdul Qadir Gilani, the founder of the Qadiri tariqa, through which he was initiated into the Qadiriyya and the spiritual chain of succession (Silsila), which ultimately leads back to Prophet Muhammad. His writings dealt with Islamic concepts of the Mujaddid and the role of the Ulama in teaching history, and other works in Arabic and the Fula language.

== Features ==
=== Symbolism ===
The members of the Qadiri order wear a rose in their cap embroidered to which they attach the following legendary history: "Know ye that every Tariqa or Path has its particular sign and that of the noble Qadiri order is the rose, the names and colours of which have been explained by the great Sheikhs of our order." In the center of the rose is a star.

The origin of the rose of the members of the Qadiri order is as follows:

"Sheikh Abdul Qadir Jilani, under the direction of Khidr, proceeded to Baghdad. When he arrived, a Sheikh sent him a cup full of water, which meant that Baghdad being full of holy men, there was no room for him. Whereupon Abdul Qadir Jilani put a rose in the cup, which meant that Baghdad would find a place for him."

The form of the rose of Baghdad is as follows: It has two outside and two inside rings, and three circles, and is made of green cloth. The first circle signifies Sharia, or God's law as revealed by his Prophet, the second signifies Tariqa, or the order, the third signifies Ma'rifa, or knowledge of God. The three together are a sign that their acquisition has bestowed the Hal, or condition, known as the Haqiqa, or truth.

=== Chain of succession ===
The following are two commonly cited spiritual chains (silsilas) tracing back to Prophet Muhammad:

1. Muhammad
2. Imam Ali ibn Abi Talib
3. Imam Hasan Basri
4. Hazrat Sheikh Habib Ajmi
5. Hazrat Sheikh Dawud Al Tai
6. Ma'ruf Karkhi
7. Sari al-Saqati
8. Junayd al-Baghdadi
9. Sheikh Abu Bakr Shibli
10. Sheikh Abdul Aziz Tamimi
11. Abu al-Fadl al-Tamimi
12. Abu al-Farah Tartusi
13. Abu al-Hasan Hankari
14. Abu Saeed Mubarak Makhzoomi
15. Abdul Qadir Gilani

Moulana Fakhruddin Dehlvi R.A, the spiritual predecessor of both Pir Mehr Ali Shah R.A and Shah Sulaiman Taunsvi R.A—appearing two steps above the latter and four steps above the former in their respective lineages—states in his book Fakhrul Hasan that narrations suggesting a meeting between Imam Ali al-Rida and Ma'ruf Karkhi are historically false. He asserts that the actual Qadiriyya silsila continues through Imam Hasan al-Basri.

This clarification is provided due to the repeated removal of the lineage tracing through Imam Hasan al-Basri by some editors. While efforts are generally made to avoid highlighting intra-traditional disputes, the omission of one widely accepted chain necessitated the inclusion of both versions for balance and accuracy.

Another version of the spiritual lineage, cited by some Qadiriyya traditions, is as follows:

1. Muhammad
2. Imam Ali ibn Abi Talib
3. Imam Husayn
4. Imam Zayn al-Abidin
5. Imam Muhammad Baqir
6. Imam Ja'far al-Sadiq
7. Imam Musa al-Kazim
8. Imam Ali al-Rida
9. Ma'ruf Karkhi
10. Sari al-Saqati
11. Junayd al-Baghdadi
12. Sheikh Abu Bakr Shibli
13. Sheikh Abdul Aziz Tamimi
14. Abu al-Fadl al-Tamimi
15. Abu al-Farah Tartusi
16. Abu al-Hasan Hankari
17. Abu Saeed Mubarak Makhzoomi
18. Abdul Qadir Gilani

== Sub-orders ==
=== Qadiri Naushahi ===
The Qadiri Naushahi sub-order of the Qadiriyya was established by Muhammad Naushah Qadiri, famously known as Hazrat Naushah Pak in Gujrat, Pakistan, in the late sixteenth century.

=== Qadiri Sarwari ===
This sub-order was started by Sultan Bahu in the seventeenth century and spread in the western part of Indian subcontinent. It follows most of the Qadiriyya's approach, although it does not follow a specific dress code nor require seclusion or other lengthy exercises. Its main purpose is the contemplation of God.

=== Qadiri Sammani ===
The Qadiri Sammani branch is present in Sudan. In the 20th-century, the Qadiri Sammani sub-order was spread to Nigeria by the mystic Nasiru Kabara.

=== Qadiri Mukhtari ===
This sub-order of the Qadiriyya came into being in the eighteenth century, led by al-Mukhtar al-Kunti of the western Sahara who wished to establish Qadiri Sufism as the dominant Sufi order in the region. In contrast to other sub-orders of the Qadiriyya that do not have a centralized authority, the Mukhtari sub-order is highly centralized. Its leaders focus on economic prosperity as well as spiritual well-being, sending their disciples on trade caravans as far away as Europe. The main focus of this sub-order is Islamic revivalism.

=== Qadiri Harari ===
The supposed founder of the Qadiriyya Harari sub-order was Abu Bakr bin 'Abd Allah 'Aydarus and his shrine is located in Harar, Ethiopia.It is claimed, however, that the founder of Qadiriyya Harari sub-order was a man by the name of Sheikh Hashim Al-Harari

The shrines of the Sheikhs of this order are predominantly located in Ethiopia, likely in and around Harar. It is also recorded that two Sheikhs have their shrines in Borama. The current leader of the sub-order is a Somali man named Mohamed Nasrudin bin Shaykh Ibrahim Kulmiye. The sub-order is widespread in Djibouti, Somaliland, Ethiopia, and Somalia. Notable leaders of the sub-order include Uways al-Barawi, Sheikh Madar, al-Zaylaʽi and Abadir Umar ar-Rida.

=== Qadiri Barkati ===
This sub-order was founded by Shah Barkatullah Marehrawi, an Islamic scholar, jurist, and Sufi living at the time of Mughal Emperor Aurangzeb, who died on the tenth of Muharram 1142 AH or October 1729 CE. He is buried in the Dargah-e Barkatiyya in Marehra, India. One of the descendants of Shah Barkatullah Marehawi was Shah Al-i Rasul Marehrawi, who was the teacher of Ahmed Raza Khan Barelvi, founder of the Barelvi movement in South Asia. Khan was initiated into the Qadiri Sufi order and was given ijazah to spread the teachings of the Qadiri, Chishti, Naqshbandi, and Suhrawardi Sufi orders. As such, followers of the Barelvi movement adhere to Qadiri, Chishti, Naqshbandi, Suhrawardi and other Sufi orders. Barelvi scholar Muhammad Ameen Mian Qadiri is the present custodian of the Qadiri Barkati sub-order.

=== Qadiri Tekkesi ===
This sub-order was founded in 1738 by the Indian Sunni Muslim Sheikh Seyfullah Effendi Hintli in Selamsız, and became popular among the Romani people in Turkey. The sub-order is present in the Balkans and Turkey.

=== Qadiri Arusi ===
This sub-order was founded by Muhammad ibn Ahmad Lebbai, reverentially known as Imam al-Arus, from which the sub-order gets its name. Muhammad ibn Ahmad Lebbai is a well-known Qadiri Sheikh in Sri Lanka, who is seen as a reviver of Islam and an advocate of communal harmony by the people of the island nation. His sub-order spread from Sri Lanka to South India, the Middle East, and even the Far East parts of Russia and China.

=== Qadiri Halisi ===
The Qadiri Halisi sub-order was founded by Abdurrahman Halis. This sub-order is one of the most popular of all, and is present in Turkey as well as Iraq, where the Qadiriyya was founded.

=== Qadiri Bahlol Shahi ===
The Qadiri Bahlol Shahi sub-order was founded by Shaikh Bahlol Daryai, also known as Shah Bahlol. He traveled across Iraq, Iran and Arabia before returning to his ancestral village near Chiniot (in present-day Punjab, Pakistan) and spreading his teachings. He assigned Madhu Lal Hussain as his representative before his death.

=== Qadiriyya wa Naqshbandiyya ===
Qadiriyya wa Naqshbandiyya is a Sufi order which is a synthesis of the Qadiri and Naqshbandi orders of Sufism. The Qadiriyya wa Naqshbandiyya Sufi order traces back through its chain of succession to Muhammad, through the Hanbali Islamic scholar Abdul Qadir Gilani and the Hanafi Islamic scholar Shah Baha al-Din Naqshband, combining both of their Sufi orders. The order has a major presence in three countries, namely Pakistan, India, and Indonesia.

=== Kasnazani ===
At-Tariqah Al-Aliyyah Al-Qadiriyyah Al-Kasnazaniyyah is the largest Sufi order in Iraq, and is also popular in Iran. Its headquarters lie in Sulaymaniyah, Iraq. It is led by Sheikh Nehro Mohammed.

== See also ==
- Sufism
- Abdul Qadir Gilani
- Dhikr
- Sufi orders
