= Mohammad Yousuf Abu al-Farah Tartusi =

Syrian Sufi Muslim saint (1016–1055)

- Born: August 21, 1016; Tartus, Syria
- Died: October 28, 1055 (aged 39); Tartus, Syria
- Other names: Alauddin, Anwar-ul-Asfiya, Shajartul Kamileen, Khazeenatul Asfiya, Raahat-ul-Muslimeen.
- Predecessor: Abu Al Fazal Abdul Wahid Yemeni Tamimi
- Successor: Abul Hasan Hankari

Mohammad Yousuf Abul Farah Tartusi (Arabic: محمد یوسف ابوالفرح طرطوسی) was a popular Sufi Muslim saint. He is regarded as one of the common ancestors of the Sufi Tariqahs, which form an unbroken chain to the Islamic prophet Muhammad.

== Biography ==
Mohammad Yousuf Abul Farah Tartusi born on August 21, 1016 CE (15 Rabi ul Awwal 407 AH) in Tartus, Syria. His father's name was Shaikh Abdullah bin Younus Tartusi. His given name was Mohammad Yousuf, while his patronymic was Abul Farah. He is sometimes given the title Alauddin.

He was known as a Qutb, which in Sufism is a perfect human being, otherwise known as al-insān al-kāmil, "The Universal Man" at the top of the saintly hierarchy. of his time known for performing miracles. He was said to have had such intense level of tawakkul and sabr that worldly matters did not concern him.

His spiritual successor was Shaikh Abul Hassan Ali bin Mohammad Qureshi Hakkari.

Abul Farah Tartusi died on October 28, 1055 CE (3 Sha'aban 447 AH), during the Abbasid Caliphate. His mausoleum is in Baghdad, Iraq.

== Spiritual lineage ==
Silsila:

1. Muhammad
2. Ali ibn Abu Talib
3. Hasan al-Basri
4. Habib al Ajami
5. Dawud Tai
6. Maruf Karkhi
7. Sirri Saqti
8. Junaid Baghdadi
9. Abu Bakr Shibli
10. Abdul Aziz bin Hars bin Asad Yemeni Tamimi
11. Abul Fazal Abdul Wahid Yemeni Tamimi
12. Mohammad Yousuf Abu al-Farah Tartusi

== Titles ==
1. ANWAR SUFIA (Light of Sufis).
2. SHAJR TUL KAMILEEN (Head of the Perfected Ones).
3. KHAZEENA AL ASFIYA (Treasure of Purity).
