= Abu al-Fadl al-Tamimi =

Baghdadi Islamic Junaidia order saint (952–1020)

Mystic, Khādimu-sh Sharī’ah [Guardian of the Sacred Law], Sāliku-t Tarīqah [Wayfarer of the Spiritual Path], Wāqifu-l Haqīqah [Unveiler of Divine Mysteries]
- Born: 952 CE/341 AH; Baghdad
- Died: 1020 CE/410 AH; Baghdad, Iraq
- Venerated in: Islam
- Preceded by: ʿAbd al-ʿAzīz b. al-Ḥārith b. Asad
- Succeeded by: Mohammad Yousuf Abū al-Faraj al-Ṭarasūsī
- Major shrine: Baghdad, Iraq
- Influences: Ahmad ibn Hanbal
- Major works: I'tiqad al-Imam al-Mubajjal Ahmad ibn Hanbal

Abū al-Faḍl al-Tamīmī (952–1020 CE/341–410 AH) Abd al-Wāḥid b. ʿAbd al-ʿAzīz b. al-Ḥārith b. Asad al-Tamīmī or Abū al-Faḍl al-Tamīmī (Arabic: أبو الفضل التميمي) was a 10th century Muslim saint who belonged to the Junaidia order. He was the son and disciple of Abu al-Hasan al-Tamimi. He was an ardent worshipper and ascetic. Not many details about his early life are known except that his family was from Yemen. His family belonged to the Arabian al-Tamimi tribe. He followed the Hanbali school of thought.

== Works ==
Among his most celebrated works is I'tiqad al-Imam al-Mubajjal Ahmad ibn Hanbal (also known as I'tiqad al-Imam al-Munabbal Abi 'Abd Allah Ahmad ibn Hanbal).

== Spiritual career ==
Abu Al Fazal Abdul Wahid Yemeni Tamimi is often associated with Abu Bakr Shibli, a sufi of Persian descent. This is probably because he looked to Abu Bakr Shibli's teachings for guidance although he gave Bayatat (oath of allegiance) to his father Abdul Aziz bin Harith bin Asad al-Tamimi from whom he was given the Sufi khirqa (the initiatory cloak of the Sufi chain of spirituality). Muhaddith Shah Waliullah Dehlawi is reported to have said, "Abdul Wahid at-Tamimi wore the khirqa from both ‘Abdul Aziz al-Tamimi and Abu Bakr Shibli. This is reflected in many of the authentic chains of spiritual transmission." Abu Al Fazal Abdul Wahid Yemeni Tamimi spent most of his life guiding people often while travelling. Amongst his various disciples, his prominent khalifah (successor) was Mohammad Yousaf Abu-al-Farrah Turtoosi.

=== Spiritual Lineage ===
Abu Al Fazal Abdul Wahid al-Tamimi's saintly lineage of Faqr was given to him through his father and Murshid Abdul Aziz bin Hars bin Asad al-Tamimi in the following order:

1. Muhammad
2. 'Alī bin Abī Ṭālib
3. al-Ḥasan al-Baṣrī
4. Habib al Ajami
5. Dawud Tai
6. Maruf Karkhi
7. Sirri Saqti
8. Junaid Baghdadi, the founder of Junaidia silsila
9. Abu Bakr Shibli
10. ʿAbd al-ʿAzīz b. al-Ḥārith b. Asad al-Tamimi
11. Abū al-Faḍl al-Tamīmī

Abdul Wahid Tamimi conferred his khilafat (successor to Muhammad) to Mohammad Yousaf Abu al-Faraj Tarasusi who continued the order.

== Titles ==
- Khādim-ush-Sharī’ah (Guardian of the Sacred Law)
- Sālik-ut-Tarīqah (Wayfarer of the Spiritual Path)
- Wāqif-ul-Haqīqah (Unveiler of Divine Mysteries)

== Death ==
Abu Al Fazal Abdul Wahid Yemeni Tamimi died in 1020 CE. He was buried in the mausoleum of Imam Ahmad b. Hanbal in Baghdad.

== See also ==
- al-Tamimi
- Abu al-Hasan al-Tamimi
- Abu Bakr Shibli
- Abu Saeed Mubarak Makhzoomi
- List of Yemenis
- List of famous Sufis
- List of Sufi saints
