= Abdul Rehman Jilani Dehlvi =

Sufi saint

Personal life
- Born: 1615 (1024 AH) Hama, Syria
- Died: 1677 (aged 61–62) (1088 AH) Delhi

Religious life
- Religion: Islam
- Denomination: Sufism

Muslim leader
- Based in: Delhi
- Predecessor: Abdul Jaleel
- Successor: Sultan Bahoo and others

Abdul Rehman Jilani Dehlvi (Urdu: سیّد عبد الرحمن جیلانی دہلوی) was a Sufi saint of the Qadri Order in the Indian subcontinent. His predecessors include Abdul Qadir Jilani, who initiated the lineage (silsila) of the Qadri order. He helped to establish the order in Delhi.

== Life ==
Abdul Rehman Jilani was born in 1615 (1024 AH) in Hama, Syria. He was the son of Abdul Qadir, a dervish from whom he received his early education. At 35, he chose to stay at the tomb of Abdul Qadir Jilani in Baghdad for three years. On 15 October 1652 (13 Dhu al-Qi'dah 1062 AH), during the Mughal era of emperor Shah Jahan, he went to India to meet Abdul Jaleel. He pledged allegiance on 10 Dhu al-Hijjah 1062 AH (10 November 1652 AD) and went to Delhi on 8 January 1653 (9 Safar 1063 AH). Here he resided himself and made a Khanqah. This is where his shrine is built as well as a mosque called Shah Abdul Rehman Mosque. Present Sadar station and quarters of Muslim Waqf board are built on his land.

At the age of 41, Abdul Rehman Jilani Dehlvi married Sayyida Zahida Khatoon who belonged to Jilani Sadaats and had 2 sons: Taj-ul-Arifeen and Abdul Aziz. In 1075, Taj-ul-Arifeen died of complications from diarrhea. Abdul Rehman Jilani Dehlvi lived a life of anonymity not giving attention to fame or the royal court of the Delhi Sultanate.

He stayed within Delhi and guided people spiritually, never leaving the city. Hence, he is also termed as Qaim Maqam Faqeer. His descendants preserved his teachings, notably his great grandson Abdullah Shah Madni Jilani in Ahmadpur Sharqiah, Bahawalpur district, Pakistan.

Dehlvi died on 16 November 1677 (21 Ramadan 1088 AH). His shrine is in Delhi.

== Students ==
Abdul Rehman Jilani's senior successor was Sultan Bahoo. His junior successors included Shah Habib Allah Qadri and Mohammad Siddique, who was the first caretaker of his shrine. Sultan Bahoo was Abdul Rehman Jilani's disciple, a saint of the Qadri family.

== The Qadri order ==
Abdul Rehman Jilani Dehlvi is one of the most recognized Sufis of the Qadri order after its founder Abdul Qadir Jilani.

Syed Shaikh Abdul Rehman Jillani was one of the most eminent saints of Dehli. His genealogy traces back to Shaikh Abdul Qadir Jilani. He was distinguished in piety and mysticism and held a high position in revelations and miracles. Syed Abdul Rehman Jillani received spiritual beneficence of the Qadiriyya way from his Murshid Syed Abdul Jaleel. The Qadiriyya way flourished in and around Dehli due to him. Countless Seekers of Allah became his disciples and he blessed many of them with Khilafat and Ijazat (permission to guide others). The famous saint Sakhi Sultan Bahoo was also his disciple.

The Qadri order branched with Sultan Bahoo to form the Sarwari Qadri order. Its disciples started adding Sarwari Qadri to their name. Many Sufi students and descendants became prominent from this order.

== Death anniversary ==
Abdul Rehman Jilani's death anniversary is celebrated on 21 Ramadan.
