= Abu al-Hasan al-Tamimi =

10th-century Yemeni Muslim saint

Saint, Mystic
- Born: 929 CE; 317 AH; Yemen
- Died: 981/2 CE; 371 AH; Yemen
- Venerated in: Islam
- Preceded by: Abu Bakr Shibli
- Succeeded by: Abu al-Fadl al-Tamimi
- Major shrine: Yemen

Abu al-Hasan 'Abd al-'Aziz b. al-Harith b. Asad b. al-Layth al-Tamimi (929–981/2 CE; 317–371 AH) (Arabic: أبو الحسن عبد العزيز بن الحارث بن أسد بن الليث التميمي) was a Muslim saint who belonged to the Junaidia order.

== Biography ==
Abdul Aziz bin Hars bin Asad Yemeni Tamimi was the disciple of Abu Bakr Shibli and became his successor (khalifah) on 21 Muharram 340 AH. He was an ardent worshipper and ascetic. He was an individual of high spirituality and perception and was known for his remarkable wit and learning. Yemeni was a part of his name as he was born and lived in Yemen. He belonged to the tribe Banu Tamim of Arabia thus part of his name was Tamimi.

=== Spiritual Lineage ===
1. Muhammad
2. 'Alī bin Abī Ṭālib
3. al-Ḥasan al-Baṣrī
4. Habib al Ajami
5. Dawud Tai
6. Maruf Karkhi
7. Sirri Saqti
8. Junaid Baghdadi, the founder of Junaidia silsila
9. Abu Bakr Shibli
10. Abdul Aziz bin Hars bin Asad Yemeni al-Tamimi

He conferred khilafat to his son and disciple Abu al-Fadl al-Tamimi who continued the order.

== See also ==
- al-Tamimi
- Abu al-Fadl al-Tamimi
