= Ishq =

Arabic word meaning 'love' or 'passion'

Ishq (Arabic: عشق, romanized: ʿishq) is an Arabic word meaning 'love' or 'passion', also widely used in other languages of the Muslim world.

The word ishq does not appear in the central religious text of Islam, the Quran, which instead uses derivatives of the verbal root habba (حَبَّ), such as the noun hubb (حُبّ). The word is traditionally derived from the verbal root ʿašaq "to stick, to cleave to" and connected to the noun ʿašaqah, which denotes a kind of ivy. In its most common classical interpretation, ishq refers to the irresistible desire to obtain possession of the beloved (ma‘shūq), expressing a deficiency that the lover (‘āshiq) must remedy in order to reach perfection (kamāl). Like the perfections of the soul and the body, love thus admits of hierarchical degrees, but its underlying reality is the aspiration to the beauty (al-husn) which God manifested in the world when he created Adam in his own image. The Islamic conception of love acquired further dimensions from the Greek-influenced view that the notions of Beauty, Good, and Truth (al-haqq) "go back to one indissoluble Unity (wahda)".

Among classical Muslim authors, the notion of love was developed along three conceptual lines, oftentimes conceived in an ascending hierarchical order: natural love, intellectual love and divine love. The growth of affection (mawadda) into passionate love (ishq) received its most probing and realistic analysis in The Ring of the Dove by the Andalusian scholar Ibn Hazm.

The term ishq is used extensively in Sufi poetry and literature to describe a "selfless and burning love" for Allah. It is the core concept in the doctrine of Islamic mysticism as is key to the connection between man and God. Ishq itself is sometimes held to have been the basis of "creation". The term ishq is widely used in the sacred text of Sikhism.

== Etymology ==
Traditional Persian lexicographers considered the Persian ešq and Arabic ʿišq (عشق) to derive from the Arabic verbal root ʿašaq (عَشَق) "to stick, to cleave to". They connected the origin of the root to ʿašaqa (عَشَقَه), a kind of ivy, because it twines around and cleaves to trees (Zamaxšari, Tâj al-'arus).

Heydari-Malayeri suggests that (ʿišq) may have an Indo-European origin and may be related to Avestan words such as iš- "to wish, desire, search", and ultimately derive from *iška. The Avestan iš- also exists in Middle Persian in the form of išt "desire".

== As a word in different languages ==
In the most languages such as Dari: eshq; in Pashto: eshq; in Somali: caashaq or cishqi; in Turkish: aşk and in Azerbaijani: eşq, in modern Persian as ešq or eshgh عشق, it literally means "love".

Some scholars objected to the use of the term 'ishq' due to its association with sensual love but despite the linguistic, cultural or technical meanings, Sufis believe that 'ishq' can only be associated to the Divine.

The word ishq referred to traditional ghazals and Indo-Persian literary culture and has made its way to many other languages which were influenced by Sufism. Some of the most notable languages which have this word are Persian, Hindi, Urdu, Pashto, Arabic, Sindhi, Saraiki: عشق, Turkish: aşk, Azerbaijani: eşq, Bengali: এশ্‌ক, romanized: eśk and Punjabi: ਇਸ਼ਕ.

In Persian, Ishq construed with the verbs "bākhtan باختن", "khāstan خواستن", "sanjīdan سنجیدن", "rūīdan روییدن", "nešāndan نشاندن", etc. In Persian, "Āšeq عاشق" is the active participle (lover), "Ma'shūq معشوق" is the passive participle (beloved), and "Ma'shūqeh معشوقه" conveys a vulgar meaning, whilst in Arabic it is the female passive participle of "Mā'shūq معشوق".

In Urdu, Ishq (عشق) is used to refer to fervent love for any object, person or God. However, it is mostly used in its religious context. In Urdu, three very common religious terminologies have been derived from Ishq. These terminologies are ishq-e Haqīqi (love of Truth), Ishq-e majāzi (love of God's creation i.e. a human), and ishq-e rasūl / ishq-e Muhammadi (love of the Messenger / love of Muhammad). Other than these, in non-religious context, ‘ishq is a synonym for obsessive love.

In Turkish, Aşk is commonly used to express love, passion or adoration. The Turkish version replaces the 'q' with a 'k', as Turkish lacks voiceless uvular plosive, and the letter 'ş' with the cedilla denotes the "sh" sound, /ʃ/. In comparison with Arabic or Urdu, (like Persian) the word is less restrictive and can be applied to many forms of love, or simply romance. It is common in the lyrics of Turkish songs.

Ishq is used in the Urdu-language, especially in Bollywood movies (Hindi cinema), which often use formal, flowery and poetic Urdu loanwords derived from Persian. The more colloquial Urdu word for love is pyar. In Urdu, ʻIshq' (عشق) means lustless love. In Arabic, it is a noun. However, in Hindi-Urdu it is used as both verb and noun.

In Modern Arabic the usual terms used for romantic love are habba and its derived forms hubb, habib, mahbub, etc.

== In Sufism ==
In religious context, Ishq, divided into three kinds, is a very important but rather complex concept of Sufi tradition of Islam.

=== Ishq-e Majāzi ===
Ishq-e Majāzi (Persian: عشق مجازی) literally means "metaphorical love". It refers to the love for God's creation i.e. love of a man for a woman or another man and vice versa. It is said to be generated by the beloved person's external beauty, but since it is connected to lust, it is against the law. Hence, in Faqr, the term Ishq-e Majāzi is directed only towards Ishq-e Murshid. This love for one's Murshid eventually leads to love for Muhammad and eventually for God, upon which one that understands Ishq-e Haqīqi is in fact the source of all 'metaphorical love'.

=== Ishq-e Rasūl or Ishq-e Muhammadi ===
Ishq-e Rasūl (Persian: عشق رسول) means "love of Muhammad," an important part of being a Muslim. In Sufism, however, the Ishq-e Majāzi changes its form to Ishq-e Rasūl through the development of an intense feeling of Ishq for Muhammad. Every existent form of creation is in fact the slave of the Creator (in the sense of being subject to His will). Since Muhammad is the most beloved to Allah, the true Lover feels Ishq-e Rasūl till "the Prophet becomes dearer to him than his life, wives, children, house, business and everything else". (Sahih Bukhari and Sahih Muslim)

=== Ishq-e Haqīqi ===
Ishq-e Haqīqi (Persian: عشق حقیقی) literally means "the real love" i.e. "the love of God". It refers to the belief that only God is worth loving and He is the only one who can return His creature's love for Him. The inner subtlety whose locus is the heart is felt by the true seeker of God only. According to this view, this is what differences man from beast because even beasts have senses, whereas inner sight is characteristic of humans.

"And those who truly believe, love Allah intensely." (Al-Baqarah 165)

== See also ==
- Sufism
- Greek words for love – Group of concepts in Ancient Greek philosophy
- Ashik
- Chesed
- Metta
- ʿUdhrī love
