= Daraza =

- Location within Pakistan
- Coordinates: 27.18°N 68.30°E
- Country: Pakistan
- Province: Sindh
- Elevation: 46 m (151 ft)
- Time zone: UTC+5 (PST)
- Number of towns: 1

Daraza (Sindhi: درازا) is a word taken from the Persian "Dar-e-raaz" meaning the door to divine secrets. It was once a state consisting of 17000 acres, and is now a village that is also called Daraza Sharif.

This village is located near the present-day Ranipur which is a city in the Khairpur District of Sindh province, Pakistan. The village is famous for being the location of the burial place and tomb of Sufi poet Faquir Abdol Wahab Farouqi who was also known as Sachal Sarmast. It is located at 27°18'22N 68°30'36E with an altitude of 46 metres (154 feet).
