= Khirqa =

Initiatory Sufi cloak

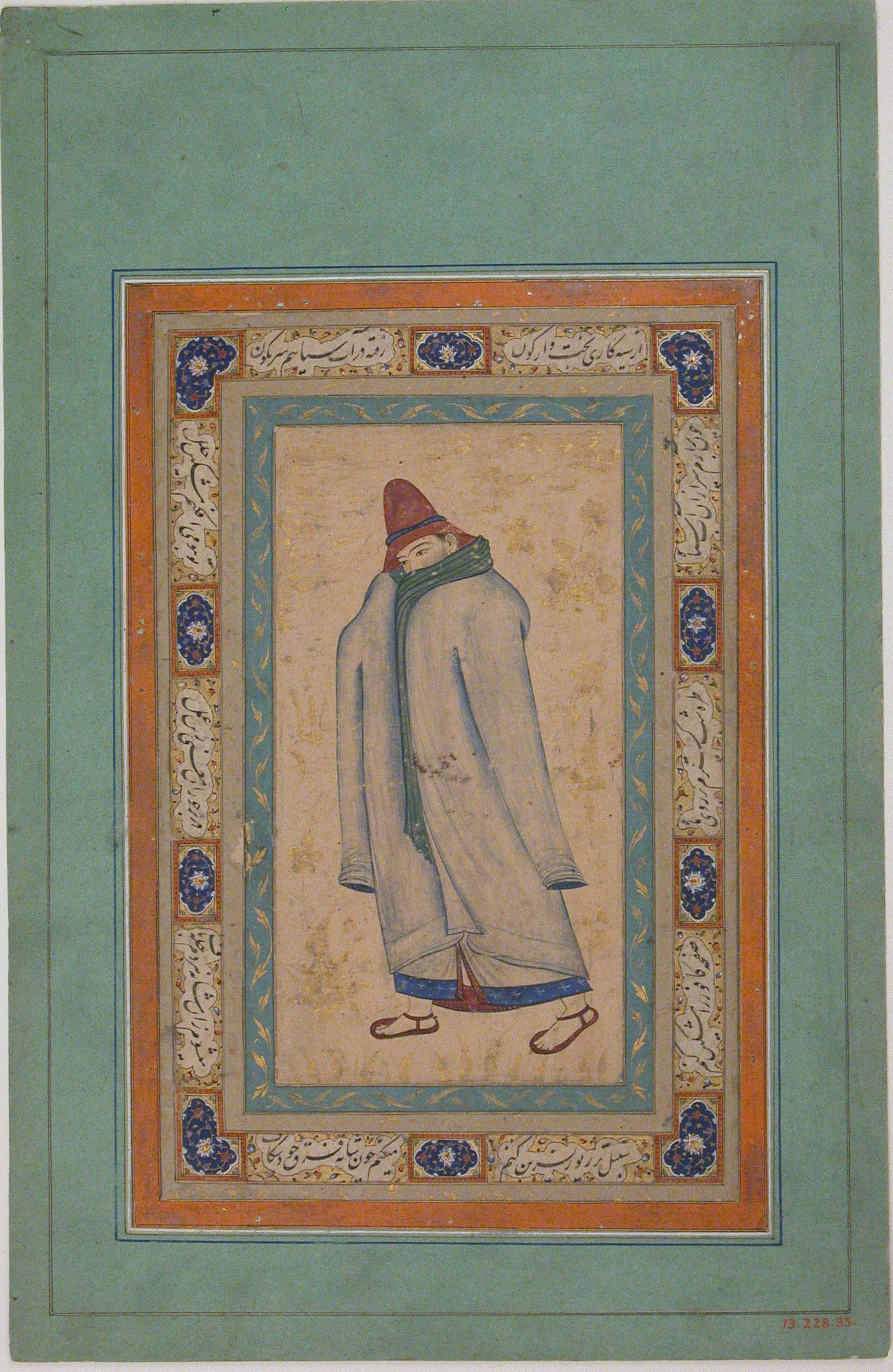
Dervish draped a blue khirqa, late 16th–early 17th century.

The khirqa is the initiatory cloak of the Sufi chain of spirituality, with which esoteric knowledge and barakah is passed from the Murshid or the Shaikh to the aspirant murid. The khirqa initiates an aspirant into the silsilah, the chain or lineage of sheikhs that goes back to the Islamic prophet Muhammad. This chain serves as the channel through which barakah flows from the source of spiritual revelation to the being of the initiate.

== Subdivisions ==
There are two kinds of this kind of transmission (tanakul) of barakah through the khirqa: khirqa-yi irada and khirqa-yi tabarruk. Khirqa-yi irada is characterized by the passing of barakah to the aspirant from the singular sheikh to which they have pledged allegiance (bay'at). Khirqa-yi tabarruk, also known as the "frock of blessing", is characterized by the passing of barakah to the worthy aspirant from any sheikh that they have encountered. The silsilah chain created from the passing of the khirqa that confirms authenticity of many hadiths is a form of isnad. It was not until the late eleventh and twelfth centuries that Sufism accepted this form of isnad as a means to transmit mystical knowledge and blessings.
