= Rabi II =

Fourth month of the Islamic calendar

- Native name: رَبِيع الثَّانِي (Arabic); رَبِيع الْآخِر (Arabic)
- Calendar: Islamic calendar
- Month number: 4
- Number of days: 29–30 (depends on actual observation of the moon's crescent)

Rabi II (Arabic: رَبِيع الثَّانِي, romanized: Rabīʿ ath-Thānī, (Note: Arabic pronunciation: [raˈbiːʕ aθˈθaːniː].) lit. 'Rabi the Second', more commonly called رَبِيع الْآخِر Rabīʿ al-ʾĀkhir, (Note: Arabic pronunciation: [raˈbiːʕ alˈʔaːxir].) lit. 'Rabi the Last') (Note: Less commonly رَبِيع الْآخِرَة Rabīʿ al-ʾĀkhira.) is the fourth month of the Islamic calendar. The name Rabīʿ ath-Thānī means "the second spring" in Arabic, referring to its position in the pre-Islamic Arabian calendar.

== Meaning ==
In Arabic, the word rabīʿ means "spring" and ath-thānī means "the second", so Rabīʿ ath-Thānī means "the second spring". As the Islamic calendar is a purely lunar calendar, the month naturally rotates over solar years, so Rabi II can fall in spring or any other season. Therefore, the month cannot be related to the actual season of spring.

== Timing ==
The Islamic calendar is a purely lunar calendar, and months begin when the first crescent of a new moon is sighted. Since the Islamic lunar year is 11 to 12 days shorter than the tropical year, Rabi II migrates throughout the seasons. The estimated start and end dates for Rabi II are as follows (based on the Umm al-Qura calendar of Saudi Arabia):

Rabi II dates between 2024 and 2028
AH	First day (CE/AD)	Last day (CE/AD)
1446	4 October 2024	2 November 2024
1447	23 September 2025	22 October 2025
1448	12 September 2026	11 October 2026
1449	2 September 2027	30 September 2027
1450	22 August 2028	19 September 2028

== Islamic events ==
- 8 or 10 Rabi II, the birth of the Eleventh Imam Hasan al-Askari
- 10 or 12 Rabi II, death of Fatimah bint Musa
- 11 Rabi II, death of Abdul-Qadir Gilani, the Sufi sheikh who is believed to be the "saint of saints"
- 27 Rabi II, death of Ahmad Sirhindi
- 28 or 29 Rabi II, death of ibn Arabi, the great philosopher from Andalus who died and rests in Damascus, Syria.
