= Maqam (Sufism) =

Spiritual state in Sufi development

Maqām (Arabic: مَقَام "station"; plural مَقَامَات maqāmāt) refers to each stage a Sufi's soul must attain in its search for God. The stations are derived from the most routine considerations a Sufi must deal with on a day-to-day basis and is essentially an embodiment of both mystical knowledge and Islamic law (Sharia). Although the number and order of maqamat are not universal the majority agree on the following seven: Tawba, Wara', Zuhd, Faqr, Ṣabr, Tawakkul, and Riḍā. Sufis believe that these stations are the grounds of the spiritual life, and they are viewed as a mode through which the most elemental aspects of daily life begin to play a vital role in the overall attainment of oneness with God.

It is within the power of a Sufi to fulfill the obligations pertaining to the specific station, and keeping it until its full precision is comprehended. That is to say, it is only when one stage has been reached that the next stage may be attained. In order to reach a higher maqam, one must continue to possess the maqam below it and not become deprived of it. Each of the stations stand related to each other in a hierarchical order, so that even when they are transcended they remain a permanent possession of the one who attained them. Possession of a certain station means not only to experience it outwardly, but to be internally transformed by it and, in a sense, to embody the stage itself.

== Tawba (Repentance) ==
The first of the maqamat is Tawba. Al-Ghazali, a prolific Sufi theologian, wrote that Tawba is the repentance of a sin with the promise that it will not be repeated and that the sinner will return to God. Junayd Baghdadi emphasized the return to God by saying this station "is forgetting your fault". This is thought to mean that after realization occurs God will be in constant remembrance and overwhelm the mind. Ibn Arabi, a Sufi mystic and philosopher who had tremendous influence on post 13th century Islamic thought, spent a great deal of time exploring what religious as well as spiritual authorities identified as being the three conditions of human tawba. The first condition is that of remorse for the violations that have been committed. The second is an immediate abandonment of the sin. The final condition is a firm resolve on the part of the sinner to never return to similar acts of disobedience. All of these conditions essentially convey the message that tawba, in its purest form, consists of forgetting one's sin. Al-Arabi concluded that brooding over ones faults, after the fact, is not only a hindrance in the remembrance of God but also a subtle form of narcissism.

== Wara' (Watchfulness) ==
People of the second maqamat, Wara' translating to "watchfulness", are divided into three ranks. The first rank is of those who are adamant about avoiding that which lies between the prohibited (harām) and the permitted (halāl). In other words, they avoid grey area. This is thought to be the rank of common people. The second rank contains those who are cautious with anything concerning sin. This can only be known by the individual. These people are free from association with anything wrong. This is said to be the rank of the select. The third rank in watchfulness is being suspicious of anything that distracts one from God. This is said to be the rank of the very select.

== Zuhd (Renunciation) ==
The station of Zuhd, translated "renunciation", concerns that which is permitted and is at hand, and the obligatory action of relinquishing all desire for that which is prohibited as well as that which is uncertain. There exist three ranks of renouncers. The first consists of those who feel no joy at worldly things acquired or grief over worldly things missed. The second rank consists of those who have realized renunciation. These are the people who have discovered that in renunciation of material goods, there are goods for the self such as praise of others, honor, and tranquility that must also be renounced. The third rank consists of those who would renounce the thought of renunciation at all.

== Faqr (Poverty) ==
Faqr, translated as "poverty", is one of the central attitudes in a Sufi's life. It was also one of the attributes of Muhammad, who said "poverty is my pride". In a spiritual sense, poverty is defined as the absence of desire for wealth in this world (Dunya) to receive more of the pleasures and everlasting wealth of the Akhira (Afterlife). One of the aspects of one who has embodied the true essence of faqr, is that the mystic must never ask anything of anyone else. The reason for this is for one to ask someone else for anything they would be relying on a created being. To receive something from that same being would produce gratitude in the heart which would be geared toward the giver, not towards God

== Ṣabr (Patience) ==
Junayd describes the fifth station, "patience", as "The bearing of the burden for the sake of God Most High until the times of hardship have passed." Al-Ghazzali divides this station into different kinds of patience. The first is to have patience with physical pain. This can be caused by serious illness, an accident or even in the tasks of God's services. This patience is judged by laws of the religion. The second kind deals with attraction to evil and greed, essentially concerning matters of self-control. He lists other kinds of patience such as that of battles, the appeasement of anger, of happiness and that of possessions. Muhammad described patience as the most difficult act of faith as well as the forbearing of hardship. Because Muhammad viewed patience as such a difficult act, it is widely followed on the path of a Sufi.

== Tawakkul (Trust) ==
Tawwakul, translated "trust" is a noble stage a Sufi must reach once he has learned patience, so that when something is denied to a mystic they trust it is in agreement with destiny. True faith is accompanied by tawwakul, a disposition that must be incessantly cultivated through pious practice and reflection. This stage is characterized by complete trust in God and surrender to His will. It is agreed upon by some scholars that because the divine power is all-encompassing, complete trust in this power is mandatory. As such, the degree of tawwakul can vary in accordance to the amount of faith a person has. To place this trust in someone else leads to the greatest sin, shirk (hidden associationism). When every feeling and thought of a mystic is directed in perfect sincerity towards only God, the mystic is then considered to be the true essence of tawwakkul. Tawwakul is not a "passive" form of fatalism that counteracts human agency, rather it can be characterized as a disposition whose achievement requires active and persistent work on one's self.

== Riḍā (Satisfaction) ==
Riḍā, the final station, is a word that only roughly translates to "acceptance" in English. Along with this is also means taking pleasure in something or someone. Acceptance is said to be the greatest gate to God and is seen as heaven on earth. The station is divided into three parts. The first consists of those who attempt to silence their anxieties until they are able to accept their misfortunes, comforts, deprivations, or bounties. The second part are those who accept God and wish God to accept them. These people do not seek priority in their acceptance even if they view all blessings and misfortunes the same. The third are those who go beyond the second group by not looking for God's acceptance of them and theirs of God. Instead of this they accept that God has preordained all of his creations.

== Comparison to Ḥāl (Spiritual State) ==
Ḥāl (pl. aḥwāl), translated "spiritual state", appears many times within Sufi texts as the opposite and complement to maqam. As an early authority on Sufism, Ali al-Hujwiri in his book Kashf al-Mahjub, defines Hal as "something that descends from God into a man’s heart, without his being able to repel it when it comes, or to attract it as it goes, by his own effort." The maqamat and the ahwal are clearly presented as two series of spiritual states, the first being something one must acquire and the second being something that must be received. To reach a new maqam does not destroy the preceding maqam. Hāl, on the contrary, is by its very nature "instantaneous", though not necessarily passive. The most prominent distinction made between the two spiritual states is that the ahwāl are essentially gifts from God, while the maqamat are acquired through the exertion of effort. In the Ihya Ulum al-din (Revivification of the religious science) al-Ghazali defines Hāl in conjunction and in contrast with maqam. He says:

Qualifications (wasf) is called "station" (maqam) if it is stable and endures and it is called "state of soul" (hāl) if it passes away and disappears without delay…What is not stable is called "state of soul" because it disappears to give its place to another state rapidly. This is true of all the qualifications of the heart.
