= Abu Bakr al-Shibli =

Islamic scholar and Sufi (861–946)

Personal life
- Born: 247 AH/861 AD, Samarra
- Died: 334 AH/946 AD, Baghdad
- Main interest(s): Sufism, Divine love
- Notable idea: Divine love

Religious life
- Religion: Islam

Muslim leader
- Influenced by: Junayd of Baghdad
- Influenced: Abdul Aziz bin Hars bin Asad Yemeni Tamimi, Abul Qasim an-Nasarabadi

Abu Bakr al-Shibli (Arabic: أبو بكر الشبلي, romanized: ʾAbū Bakr al-Shiblī; c. 861–945 or 946; AH 247–334), full name Abū Bakr Dulaf ibn Jahdar al-Shiblī, was an important Islamic scholar and Sufi mystic of Baghdad, of Persian and Turkic background. Originally a high-ranking government official, he turned to the mystical life at about the age of forty and became a disciple of Junayd al-Baghdadi, whose "sober" school of Sufism he followed, while in jurisprudence he adhered to the Maliki school.

Despite his association with Junayd's sober tradition, al-Shibli became known for extreme and eccentric ascetic practices. His behaviour reportedly included rubbing salt into his eyes to prevent sleep, and his excesses eventually led to his confinement in a lunatic asylum. There, however, he continued to give discourses on the Sufi path to distinguished visitors who came from across the Muslim world. He also became known for condemning al-Ḥallāj, even at the scaffold, on the grounds that al-Ḥallāj had disclosed esoteric mystical secrets to the uninitiated masses.

Al-Shibli left no works of his own, but his aphorisms and mystical utterances were preserved in classical Sufi literature, including al-Hujwīrī's Kashf al-Maḥjūb ("Unveiling of the Hidden"). He became an important link in the silsilah, or chains of spiritual transmission, of numerous Sufi orders, and his tomb in Baghdad continued to be venerated.

== Biography ==
Imam Abu Bakr Shibli was born in Samarra, although his family was of Iranian origin from the village of Shibliyah in Osrushana, Transoxania. His father was Jafar bin Yunus al-Shibli and of Turkic origin. Abu Bakr al-Shibli was a high official of Baghdad before he embarked on the spiritual path and became a disciple of Junayd Baghdadi. His name was mentioned by the Persian poets such as Attar, Rumi and Sanai. He was also associated with Hallaj. According to one source, he was in a constant state of jazb and was finally committed to an asylum. Others assert that he feigned madness.

Attributed to him is the saying:

O people! I go to a place beyond which there is no beyond. I go to the south and the north, to a place beyond which there is no beyond. Everything that I saw after that I could see in one hair of my little finger.

Shibli was imprisoned many times by the Caliph despite his influence and enormous wealth. Shibli went into self-imposed exile and began searching for divinity. Meanwhile, in the Sultanate, the Caliph realised that Shibli had not committed any wrongdoing and a search party was sent out to find him. The officials carried a set of royal robes that the Caliph had sent for Shibli to wear. The officials offered the robes to Shibli saying that a decree had been passed reinstating him and that he could return without fear of being prosecuted. Shibli took the robes and wiped his sweating face with them.

Shocked at such demeaning behaviour, the officials reported the incident to the Caliph. Shibli was charged with contempt. Shibli responded:

O great Caliph! You are annoyed because I did not accept your gift and return to you. How angry Almighty God should be that even after He gave me the robe of His Divine Love, I shunted all His duties and went about aimlessly in this world forgetting Him every moment? This body is given by Him, yet I ignored Him. Shouldn't He be angry?

The Caliph thought that Shibli was mad, revoked his order of restitution and threw him out of the palace. Shibli fled to the desert.

== Stories about Shibli's spiritual life ==
Later he met Abul-Qasim Mohammad Al-Junayd of Baghdad and recognised his spiritual greatness: "O revered One! You have the jewel of heaven with you. I also want to have it." In reply, Junayd smiled and said, "You have to struggle and undergo several hardships to attain that jewel." Junayd told him: "You were a high officer under the Caliph. Now go and trade salt in the market in the main town for a year." Shibli did as he was bid and plunged headlong into the business. He was mocked but remained calm. At the end of a year, Shibli returned to Junayd who said: "Not much though! The improvement is only marginal. Still, a really long way to go till you begin to have a glimpse of your goal. So, now go and beg for food in Baghdad for a year."

Shibli set off to beg for food in Baghdad, where he had enjoyed an enormous influence. "Do you realise your true worth now at least?" asked Junayd one day. A year thus passed. Junayd bade Shibli to go around the kingdom and beg pardons from all those he had wronged during his tenure in the Caliph's court. This took him four years. Upon his return, Junayd told him to beg for another year. In the last year of begging, people gave him food and other things generously. They had come to know of Shibli's honesty and integrity. Shibli deposited what he received at the feet of Junayd, who distributed it to the needy. This lasted seven to eight years. One day Junayd asked Shibli, "How do you feel now?" Shibli replied, "I deem myself the meanest of God's creatures." Junayd embraced his worthy disciple. Hence, Junayd Baghdadi conferred khilafat upon Abu Bakr Shibli who led the order after him.

Shibli preached to others to repeat Allah's name incessantly for emancipation which is known as dhikr in Islamic terminology. However, the moment he realised that their repetitions were only outward and not bursts of devotion, he stopped advocating the invocation of the Name as a spiritual practice. One day he heard a divine voice speak: "How long will you hold on to the Name. Go for the Named." He began experiencing the longing for God to the core. Such was his intensity of desire for Allah that he roamed all over the land crying for Allah. He tried to by kill himself by jumping into the waters but was washed ashore. He then jumped into fire but came out unscathed. A divine voice told him: "He who has surrendered to God, who is dead to all worldly phenomena, cannot be harmed by the elements." Shibli's doubts were cleared but people considered him mad. Ten times he was chained to a post, whipped and confined to in a cell.

On festival days, Shibli wore a black mourning gown. People objected to his behaviour and asked: "Why this? What are you mourning for on the day of joy?" Shibli replied, "I am mourning because people don't have love for God but are only outwardly happy. In my opinion, it is an occasion of immense sorrow." "Are we not lovers of God," the people asked him. Shibli pointed out to a block of firewood burning there. "It should be like that firewood," said he. "How," the people asked. They could not understand. "See the fire is burning at one end and water is coming out from the other end. If the fire of love for God is burning in the heart, the sure sign is tears of love inundating the eyes not outer joy."

=== Spiritual Lineage ===
The spiritual lineage of Abu Bakr Shibli which reached him from Prophet Mohammad was as follows:

1. Mohammad
2. 'Alī bin Abī Ṭālib
3. al-Ḥasan al-Baṣrī
4. Habib al Ajami
5. Dawud Tai
6. Maruf Karkhi
7. Sirri Saqti
8. Junaid Baghdadi, founder of the Junaidia order
9. Abu Bakr Shibli

Of his khalifahs, Abdul Aziz bin Hars bin Asad Yemeni Tamimi, continued his teachings and order.

== Illness and death ==
Shibli would squeeze himself into a small hole not even big enough for a small animal and sit there crying and praying. If he grew sleepy, he rubbed salt into his eyes. If that failed, he would beat himself severely with a stick. His voice changed and his words were charged with the fire of truth. Junayd blessed his disciple and declared that he had achieved the Ultimate Vision of Supreme Reality. But his harsh way of life took its toll. Shibli's health gave way. His admirers gathered to have their last glimpse of him and pay him their respects. He was buried in al-Khayzaran Cemetery of Baghdad and a tomb was erected at the site. Some of his disciples were buried around him.

== See also ==
- List of Sufis
