= Murshid =

Term used in Sufism for a spiritual guide

Murshid (Arabic: مرشد) is Arabic for "guide" or "teacher", derived from the root r-sh-d, with the basic meaning of having integrity, being sensible, mature. Particularly in Sufism it refers to a spiritual guide. The term is frequently used in Sufi orders such as the Naqshbandiyya, Qādiriyya, Chishtiya, Shadhiliya and Suhrawardiyya.

The path of Sufism starts when a student (murid) takes an oath of allegiance or Bay'ah (bai'ath) with a spiritual guide (murshid). In speaking of this initiatory pact of allegiance, the Qur’ān (48:10) says: Verily they who pledge unto thee their allegiance pledge it unto none but God. The Hand of God is above their hands.

The murshid's role is to spiritually guide and verbally instruct the disciple on the Sufi path, but "only one who has himself reached the End of the path is a spiritual guide in the full sense of the Arabic term murshid".

A murshid usually has authorisation to be a teacher for one tariqā (spiritual paths). Any tariqa or silsila has one murshid at a time who is the head of the spiritual order. He is known as the shaykh, by way of khilafah: process in which the shaykh identifies one of his disciples as his successor, for the khalifa.

== Importance ==
In Sufism, it is the transmission of the divine light from the murshid's heart to the disciple's which surpasses any other source of knowledge and is the only way to progress directly towards the divine. The concept of Murshid Kamil Akmal (also known as Insan-e-Kamil) is significant in most tariqas. The concept states that from pre-existence till pre-eternity, there shall always remain a Qutb or a Universal Man upon the earth who would be the perfect manifestation of God's will and thus following in the very footsteps of the preeminent Islamic prophet Muhammad.

== See also ==
- Pir (Sufism)
- Rōshi
- Spiritual direction
- Starets
- Guru
