= Habib al-Ajami =

8th century Muslim Sufi mystic, saint and traditionalist

Mystic
- Born: 7th or 8th Century; Persia
- Died: March 738 (3 Rabi' al-Thani 120 AH).
- Venerated in: Islam
- Influences: Hasan al-Basri
- Influenced: Dawud Tai

Habib ibn Muhammad al-‘Ajami al-Basri (Arabic: حبيب بن محمد العجمي البصري) known also as Habib al-Ajami (حبيب العجمي) and Habib al-Farsi (حبيب الفارسي) was a Muslim Sufi mystic, saint, and traditionalist of Persian descent. Different dates for his death are given in the sources, such as 113 AH (731 CE), 120 (738), 125 (743), and 130 (747-48). Habib-i Ajami settled in Basra, where his shrine is. He is a disciple of Hasan al-Basri. His disciple is Dāwūd al-Tai.

According to Ibn Hajar, Habib is a solid hadith narrator. Hasan al-Basri, Ibn Sirrin, Abu Tamima al-Hujaymi and Bakir bin Abdullah narrated hadiths from him, and Sulayman al-Taymi, Hammad bin Salama, Jafar bin Sulayman and Mu'tamir bin Sulayman reported from him. Bukhari also mentioned him in al-Adab al-Mufrad (I, 366) and al-Tarikh al-Kabir (II, 326). Although Ibn al-Jawzi says that Habib, the narrator of the hadith, is another person, this information should be viewed with caution unless it is confirmed by other sources.

== Biography ==
There is insufficient information about his family and life, but he was originally from Persia. Abu al-Fayd al-Manufi records that he was the son of a king without citing the source. It is rumored that Habib was engaged in trade and usury before turning to Sufism (tasawwuf), and collected a messenger's fee from the debtor if they were not able to pay when he went to collect his debt. It is said that once when he was about to eat a beggar asked him for alms and he harshly scolded him. Meanwhile, when his wife told him that his food had become bloodied, Habib regretted what he had done and decided to become an honest merchant and quit usury. According to the legend, Habib was extremely upset when the children who were playing games while he was passing by, ran away from him because they were fearful, and he went to the assembly of Hasan al-Basri and repented.

Fariduddin Attar records that Habib-i Ajami received knowledge from Hasan-i Basri during the day and was busy with worship at night in the zawiya he had built on the edge of the Euphrates. According to the rumor, Hasan-i Basri thought that it would not be possible to pray behind him because Habib mispronounced Quranic verses while praying. However, in his dream, he was warned that all the prayers he performed would be accepted for the sake of the prayer he would offer behind Habib, because there was a big difference between correcting the tongue and correcting the heart. This narration is important in that it is one of the first characteristic examples of the mystical understanding that prioritizes the inward over the outward.

== Significance ==
Another feature of Habib is that he is a person whose prayers are accepted according to common opinion. Attar mentions various legends on this subject. Habib's wife Amra was also one of the women ascetics of the time.

The main importance of Habib in terms of the history of tasawwuf is that he takes place after Hasan al-Basri in the chain of succession (silsila) of the tariqas that were formed in the centuries after the period of asceticism (zuhd). Dawud al-Tai is seen as his disciple in these chains. The fact that they were included in the chains of great orders such as the Naqshbandi, Qadiri, and Mawlawi enabled their legends to reach the present day.

== See also ==
- Suhrawardiyya
