= Dawud al-Ta'i =

8th-century Iraqi Islamic scholar and sufi

Abu Sulaiman Dawud ibn Nusair al-Tā'ī

Personal life
- Born: 7th or 8th Century

Religious life
- Religion: Islam

Muslim leader
- Influenced by: Habib al-Ajami, Abu Hanifa
- Influenced: Maruf Karkhi

Abū Sulaymān Daʾūd ibn Nuṣayr al-Ṭā'ī, (Arabic: ابو سلیمان داؤد بن نصیر الطائي) usually referred to as Dawud Taʾi, (died between 776 and 783) was a scholar of Islam and Sufi mystic. He resided in Kufa and was a prominent student of Abu Hanifa. His disciples included many influential figures in Islamic mysticism, such as Ma'ruf al-Karkhi. His master was Habib al-Ajami.

== Biography ==
Ta'i studied hadith and fiqh for many years with Abu Hanifa in Kufa, and being one of his favorite students, he reached a high level in science and fiqh. He also had an effective speaking ability and was probably a bit offensive too. As a matter of fact, once when he hit someone with a stick, his teacher Abu Hanifa had to scold him: "Abu Suleiman, your hand and tongue are growing long!" Dawud al-Tai was highly affected by this warning and did not speak in the last year of his studentship; he neither asked nor answered any questions. Although al-Tai was "the most fluent speaker of his time and the one who knew Arabic best", and "one of the leading imams in fiqh and opinion", he threw his books into the Euphrates River for some reasons that are shown differently in the sources and retreated to zuhd and worship. He completely distanced himself from the public and worldly affairs, locked himself in his house, and joined the congregation only at prayer times.

Among the people he met were Fudayl b. Iyaz, Jafar al-Sadiq and Ibrahim ibn Adham. He also met the Abbasid Caliph Harun al-Rashid according to Imam Abu Yusuf. According to Fariduddin Attar, Fudayl b. Iyaz was proud to have had the honor of meeting him twice. One of his contemporaries in describing his greatness said, "If Dawud al-Tai had lived in the Age of Bliss [the Holy Prophet's time], the Qur'an would certainly have mentioned his zuhd and taqwa."

Maruf Karkhi, his best-known disciple, introduces his master by saying, “I have never seen anyone who does not value the world as much as Tai.” The fact that he used the expression "May your death be your celebration" while wishing someone well and that he saw death as salvation from the prison of this world reflects the characteristic feature of the life of asceticism at that time. This optimistic understanding about death turned into Shab-i Arus (Wedding Night) in later periods. Dawud al-Tai, who bequeathed his grave to be built in a deserted place and thus wanted the seclusion in the world to continue there, used to attach great importance to worship, but said that one should not see one's worship as perfect and should not trust their worship. According to him, the worship of a person who does not have generosity and muruwa is incomplete. As a matter of fact, after he turned to Sufism, he spent the money left by his father with his friends.

Al-Tai died while reading the Qur'an in his house, which was in ruins. In the sources, it is narrated that he fell ill and died due to the strong influence of a verse about hell that he recited one night until the morning.

== See also ==
- List of Sufis
- Suhrawardiyya
