= Sari al-Saqati =

9th-century Sufi Muslim saint

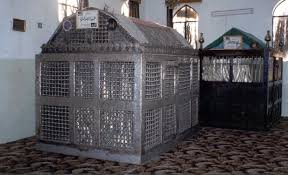
- Zarih of Junayd of Baghdad and the smaller wooden zarih of his master Sari al-Saqati

Religious life
- Religion: Islam

Muslim leader
- Influenced by: Maruf Karkhi
- Influenced: Junayd of Baghdad

Sari ibn al-Mughallis al-Saqati (Persian: السري بن المغلس السقطي, romanized: Sarī ibn al-Mughallis al-Saqaṭī was one of the early Muslim Sufi saints of Baghdad. He was one of the most influential students of Maruf Karkhi and one of the first to present Sufism (tasawwuf) in a systematic way. He was also a friend of Bishr al-Hafi. He was the maternal uncle and spiritual master of Junayd of Baghdad.

== Biography ==
He was born in 155 AH (772 CE) in the Karkh district of Baghdad. He made a living by continuing his father's scrap business (saqati). In the first period of his life, he traveled as far as Mecca to collect hadith. His master Maruf Karkhi, and Habib al-Ajami (al-Rai) had an influence on his taking the path of Sufism (tasawwuf). According to rumors, Maruf Karkhi came to Sari's shop with an orphan child asking him to dress the child. Sari fulfilled the request, and with the blessings of the prayer he received from Karkhi, he entered the path of asceticism. He gave 10 coins to Habib al-Ajami to be spent on dervishes. Upon al-Ajami’s prayer, his heart turned cold from worldly interests and turned to Sufism. Sari al-Saqati was in conversation with famous Sufis of the period such as Maruf Karkhi, Harith al-Muhasibi, and Bishr Hafi, and is the uncle and master of Junayd of Baghdad. His tales, words and ideas were generally transmitted by Junayd.

During his travels from Baghdad to the northern regions, Sari al-Saqati had the opportunity to meet many Sufis. He entered a zawiyah in Abadan, which belonged to the Sufis of the Basra Sufi school. Ali al-Jurjani, whom he met during his journey, advised him to go to Syria. In Syria, he was influenced by the Sufis who continued Ibrahim bin Adham's understanding of mysticism based on futuwwa and sincerity. He lived in Damascus, Ramla, Jerusalem and Tarsus for a while. After participating in the jihad against the Byzantines in that region when he was in his sixties, he settled in Baghdad in 218 (833), and lived there until the end of his life. The grave of Sari al-Saqati is next to Junaid al-Baghdadi in the Shunuziyya Cemetery in Baghdad.

Al-Saqati was the shaykh of prominent sufis of his time such as Junayd al-Bahdadi, Abu Said al-Harraz, Abu al-Husayn al-Nuri, Samnun bin Hamza and Ibn Masruq of Baghdad and Khorasan, and Ali al-Gada’iri and Ismail bin Abdullah al-Shami of Syria. Sulami says that most of the later Sufis followed the way of Sari. Abu Nuaym al-Isfahani and Fariduddin Attar wrote about him as a Sufi with knowledge, wisdom, love, ingenuity and compassion.

Known for his asceticism (zuhd) and fear of God (taqwa), Sari al-Sakati was sensitive about and avoided eating and using things whose halal status was questionable, and he strongly condemned those who made religion a means of livelihood. He would advise them to choose seclusion (khalwa) by saying, "Whoever wants to go to a corner of seclusion", and he would advise those who were engaged in commerce not to separate their hearts from the Truth (al-Haqq) even for a moment, that they should make a living with manual labor and that the divine light would not reflect on the heart of anyone whose food was doubtful. He was so observant of manners in front of Allah that he would not lie on his back or put his feet in the direction of the qibla. According to the sources, he was quite humble, always watching himself by avoiding falling into sin, and avoided hypocrisy to the extent that he wished to die in a place where no one knew him, fearing that the earth would not accept his body after his death. The sources state that he was a Sufi who preferred others to himself, saying, "I wish everyone would feel relieved even if I suffered from them". As a matter of fact, according to a legend, when he heard that his own shop was not burned after a fire in the bazaar, he was grateful to Allah saying, "Alhamdulillah", but because he did not share the sorrows of those whose shops were burned, he realized that he had made a mistake and begged God's forgiveness for thirty years.

Sari al-Sakati is of the opinion that it is necessary for disciples to learn hadith before they join the path of asceticism and mysticism, otherwise religious life would be dragged into slackness. He prayed for his disciple Junayd saying, "May Allah grant you to be a person who learns not first tasawwuf and then hadith, but first hadith and then tasawwuf." However, like Bishr al-Hafi, he gave importance to understanding the meaning of the hadith rather than narrating hadith, so he did not narrate many hadiths. According to Sari, being a person of zeal in the way of sunnah is better than many deeds done in bid'ah.

In his understanding of mysticism, observance of the Sacred Law (shar'ia) and outwardly rules is essential. Knowledge is only valuable to the extent that it leads to action, and the light of knowledge attained by the sufi should not extinguish the light of taqwa in him. The sign of having knowledge about Allah is to observe His laws and to prefer them to the ego (nafs) as much as possible. Sari describes the ‘arif being like the sun which illuminates every place, the earth that bears the burden of everyone, the water that is the source of life, and the torch that illuminates all sides. According to him, esoteric knowledge that contradicts the apparent meanings of the Qur'an and hadiths is invalid. In order to achieve esoteric knowledge, the soul must be taken into account and trained by doing a lot of work. Harith al-Muhasibi, who takes self-accounting as a basis in Sufism, influenced this attitude of Sari.

Sari al-Saqati said that supernatural wonders (karamat) should not be trusted and given much importance, that the sufi's possession of them would cause them to tear the veils of Divine privacy. He stated that if they cause peace of mind, it means one is being captive to miracles, and he described "istidraj" as "blindness in seeing the faults of the soul".

Love of God has an important place in his mystical experience, accordingly Sari said, “If the people of love were hit with a sword in their face, they would not know about it”; “My God! Whatever you punish me with just don't torment us by putting a curtain between us." According to Sari, Sufism (tasawwuf) is attaining good morals, fulfilling the obligatory (fard) duties, avoiding the forbidden (haram), not being heedless, giving lots of alms, being repentant and compassionate are the morals of virtuous people. Good morals are not to hurt people, to endure the oppression of the people without holding grudges and thinking about revenge. Sari al-Sakati was influential on the Sufis after him by educating Junayd of Baghdad, known as "Sayyid al-Taifa", the founder of the Baghdad Sufi school.

== Bibliography ==
- Abu Talib al-Makki, Qut al-Qulub, Cairo 1961, I, 322;
- Sulami, Tabaqat, p. 48-55;
- Abu Nuaym, Hilya, X, 48, 116-127;
- Khatib, Tarikh Baghdad, VIII, 211;
- Qushayri, al-Risala, p. 64, 65, 761;
- Hujwiri, Kashf al-Mahjub, p. 137, 558;
- Harawi, Tabaqat, p. 96-97;
- Ibn al-Jawzi, Sifat al-Safwa, II, 371;
- Feriduddin Attar, Tazkarat al-Awliya (tr. Süleyman Uludağ), Istanbul 1991, p. 354-366;
- Ibn Khallikan, Wafayat, II, 357-359;
- Ibn Hajar al-Askalani, Lisan al-Mizan, Beirut 1390/1971, III, 13;
- Lami’i, Nafakhat Translation, p. 106;
- Sha’rani, al-Tabaqat, I, 74;
- Munawi, al-Kawakib, I, 231-233;
- M. Jalal Sharaf, Dirasat fi al-Tasawuf al-Islami, Beirut 1404/1984, p. 179;
- Abdul Husain Zarrinkub, Justuju der Tasavvuf-i Iran, Tehran 1369 hş., p. 114-117;
- Aziz Seyyid Jasim, Mutasawwifat Baghdad, Baghdad 1997, p. 119-130;
- Tahsin Yazıcı, “Serî-üs-Sakatî”, İA, X, 520;
- B. Reinert, “Sarī al-Saḳatī”, EI2 (Eng.), IX, 56-59.

== See also ==
- List of Sufis
- Seyyed Qutb al-Din Mohammad Neyrizi
