= Silsila =

Concept of lineage in Sufi order of Islam

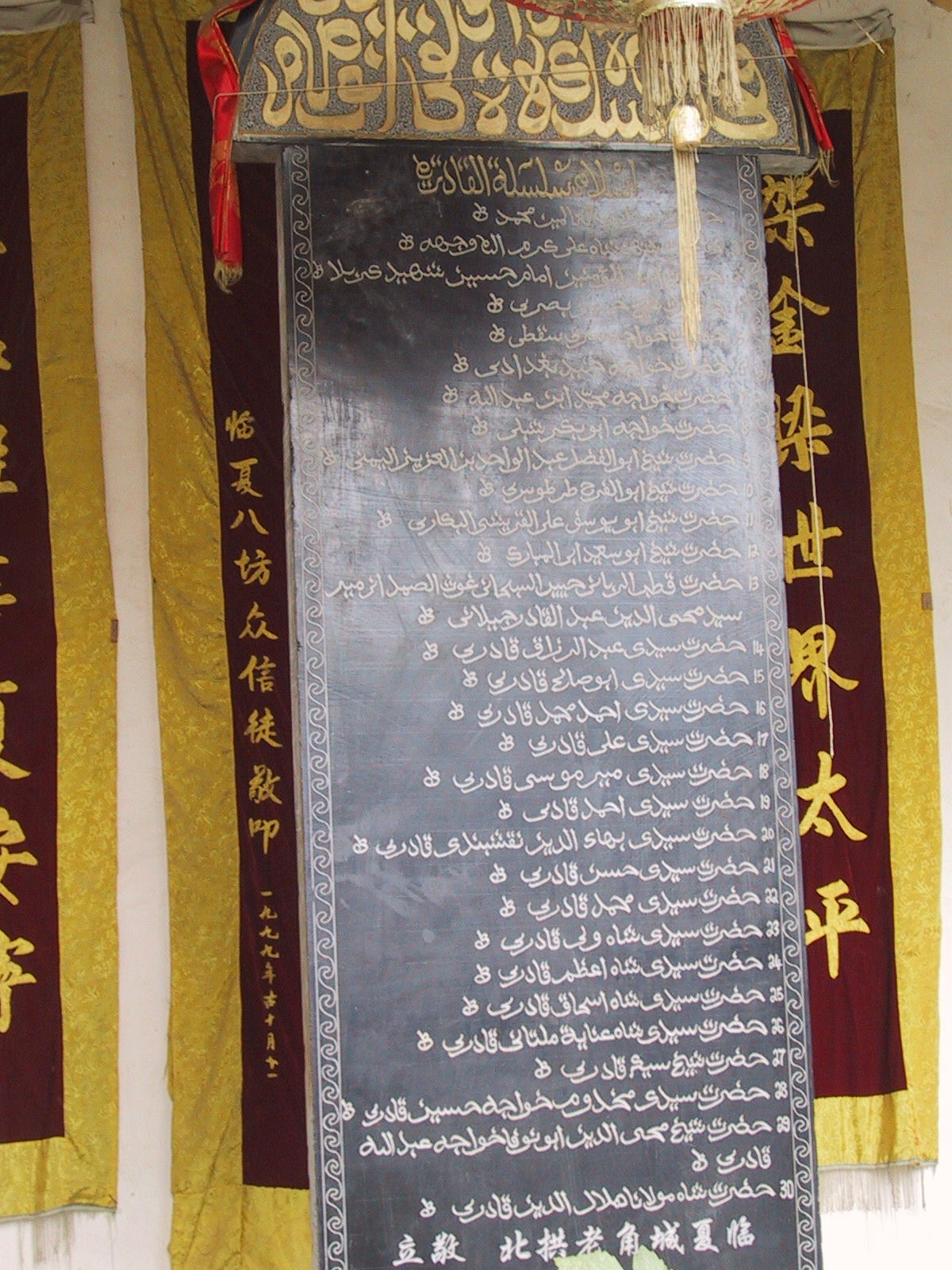
A silsilah tablet in Yu Baba Gongbei in Linxia City

Silsila (Arabic: سِلْسِلَة) is an Arabic word meaning chain, link, connection often used in various senses of lineage. In particular, it may be translated as "spiritual genealogy" where one Sufi Master transfers his khilafat to his khalîfa, or spiritual descendant. In Urdu, silsila means saga.

== Historical importance ==
Every Sufi order, or tariqa, has a silsila. Silsila originated with the initiation of tariqa which dates back to the Islamic prophet Muhammad. Most silsila trace their lineage back to his cousin and son-in-law Ali bin Abi Talib such as the Qadiriyyah, the Chishtiyya, the Noorbakhshia and the Suhrawardiyyah orders. However, the Naqshbandiyyah order is through Abu Bakr.

Centuries ago, Arabia did not have schools for formal education. Students went to masters who taught them. Upon completion of their study, they received ijazah (permission) which acted as the certification of their education. A graduate then acted as a master having his own students or disciples. This chain of masters was known as silsila or lineage. Somewhat analogous to the modern situation where degrees are only accepted from recognized universities, the certification of a master having a verifiable chain of masters was the only criterion which accorded legitimacy:

Theoretically one can only receive instruction in these practices (talqîn) from an authorised teacher of the tariqa, and only after pledging a vow of obedience (bay'ah) to this shaikh. The shaykh gives his disciples permission (ijâza) to practice the tariqa: he may also authorise one or more of them to teach it to others, i.e. appoint them as his khalîfa or successor. In this way a hierarchically ordered network of teachers may emerge. Each sheikh can show a chain of authorities for the tariqa he teaches, his silsila or spiritual genealogy. Usually the silsila reaches back from one's own teacher up to the Prophet, with whom all tariqa claim to have originated although there have been modifications along the way. A Sufi's silsila is his badge of identity and source of legitimation; it provides him with a list of illustrious predecessors and shows how he is related to other Sufis.

Silsila can be of a partial knowledge or a book as well. All ḥāfiẓa (memorizers of Quran), muḥaddithūn (narrators of hadith), and qāriʾūna (reciters of Quran with tajwid, or correct accent and pronunciation), for example, are given a chain of credible narrators linking to Muhammad.

== Chain of authority ==
For Muslims, the Chain of Authenticity is an important way to ascertain the validity of a saying of Muhammad (also known as a Hadith). The Chain of Authenticity relates the chain of people who have heard and repeated the saying of Muhammad through the generations, until that particular Hadith was written down (Ali bin Abi Talib said that 'Aisha said that the Prophet Muhammad said...). A similar idea appears in Sufism in regards to the lineage and teachings of Sufi masters and students. This string of master to student is called a silsila, literally meaning "chain". The focus of the silsila like the Chain of Authenticity is to trace the lineage of a Sufi order to Muhammad through his Companions: Ali bin Abi Talib (the primary link between most Sufi orders and Muhammad) and Abu Bakr (the Naqshbandiyyah order). When a Sufi order can be traced back to Muhammad through one Ali or Abu Bakr, the lineage is called the Silsilat al-Dhahab (dhahab meaning gold) or the "Chain of Gold" (Golden Chain). In early Islamic history, gold was an extremely desired prize and was used for currency, to show wealth and power, and for scientific purposes including medicine. Thus, gold was the most desired commodity in the material world, just as the Golden Chain is the most desired commodity of Sufi orders.

When Sufism began in the second century of Islam, according to some experts, it was an individual choice; many Sufis aimed to be more like Muhammad by becoming ascetic and focusing their lives fully on God; more so than the Five Daily Prayers and usual prescripted religious practices. This often included removing oneself from society and other people in general. As Sufism became a greater movement in Islam, individual Sufis began to group together. These groups (also known as orders) were based on a common master. This common master then began spiritual lineage, which is a connection between a Sufi order in which there is a common spiritual heritage based on the master's teachings (i.e., ‘path’ or ‘method’) called tariq or tariqah. As the number of Sufi orders grew, there arose a need for legitimacy of the orders to establish each order was following the teachings of Muhammad directly; thus the idea of the Silsilat al-Dhahab. If a Sufi order is able to trace its student to master lineage back to Ali bin Abi Talib who provides a straight link to Muhammad (because of his inheritor status with him) then the order is considered righteous and directly following the teachings of Muhammad. In possessing the Golden Chain, a Sufi order is able to establish their order prominently in the mystical world.

== Shia term ==
Shias use it idiomatically to mean a lineage of authentic Masters.

== China ==
Among Chinese Muslims, the concept of silsilah has developed into that of a menhuan (门宦): a Chinese-style Sufi order whose leaders trace a lineage chain going back to the order's founder in China (e.g., Ma Laichi given name Abu I Fateh or Ma Mingxin given name Ibrahim), and beyond, toward his teachers in Arabia.

== Indonesia ==
The term is used as the title of royal family trees and family records of the rulers in the palaces of Java.

== See also ==
- Apostolic succession, a similar concept in Christianity
- Tariqa
- Isnad, Islamic System of Certification
- Sampradaya, a similar concept in Indian Religions
