= Ma'ruf al-Karkhi =

Baghdadi Sufi Muslim saint (c.750/60–c.815/20)

Maruf Karkhi
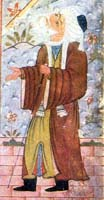
- A depiction of Ma'ruf al-Karkhi
- Born: c. 750–60 C.E. Baghdad
- Died: c. 815–20 C.E.
- Venerated in: Islam
- Influences: Ali ibn Musa and Dawud Ta'i
- Influenced: Sari al-Saqati

Ma'ruf ibn Firuz al-Karkhi (Persian: معروف بن فيروز الكرخي, romanized: Maʿrūf ibn Fīrūz al-Karkhī) was a Sufi Muslim saint.

== Biography ==
Maruf was born in the district of Wasit or Karkh in Baghdad. According to some sources, he is of Mandaean origin. His father's name was Firuz, which suggests that he was of Persian origin. Attar narrates in his Memorial of the Saints that Maruf converted to Islam at a young age at the hands of Ali al-Ridha after rejecting all forms of polytheism. Tradition recounts that he immediately went and told his father and mother, who rejoiced at his decision and became Muslims themselves. After accepting Islam, Maruf became a student of Dawud al-Ta'i, and underwent a severe trial of his discipleship. Maruf, however, remained steadfast and proved himself so devout that his righteousness became locally famous.

Maruf is also known to have a close relationship with Ahmad ibn Hanbal, in which ibn Hanbal is reported to have said "True knowledge is only that which Ma‘ruf has achieved.”

== Sufi tradition ==
In Sufism, those of the order of Marufi are those connected to Maruf Karkhi. Maruf thus forms a penultimate link in what is known as the Golden Chain, the initiation line which forms an unbroken chain to Muhammad. Maruf, being the disciple of Ali al-Ridha, formed part of that lineage, while at the same time maintaining the teachings of his master Dawud Ta'i and thus being his successor as well. Sufis venerate Maruf highly for the multiple spiritual chains which interlock in his teachings.

== See also ==
- List of Sufis
- Seyyed Qutb al-Din Mohammad Neyrizi
