= Junayd of Baghdad =

Persian Islamic mystic and Sufi saint (830–910)

Abu 'l-Qasim al-Junayd ibn Muhammad al-Baghdadi
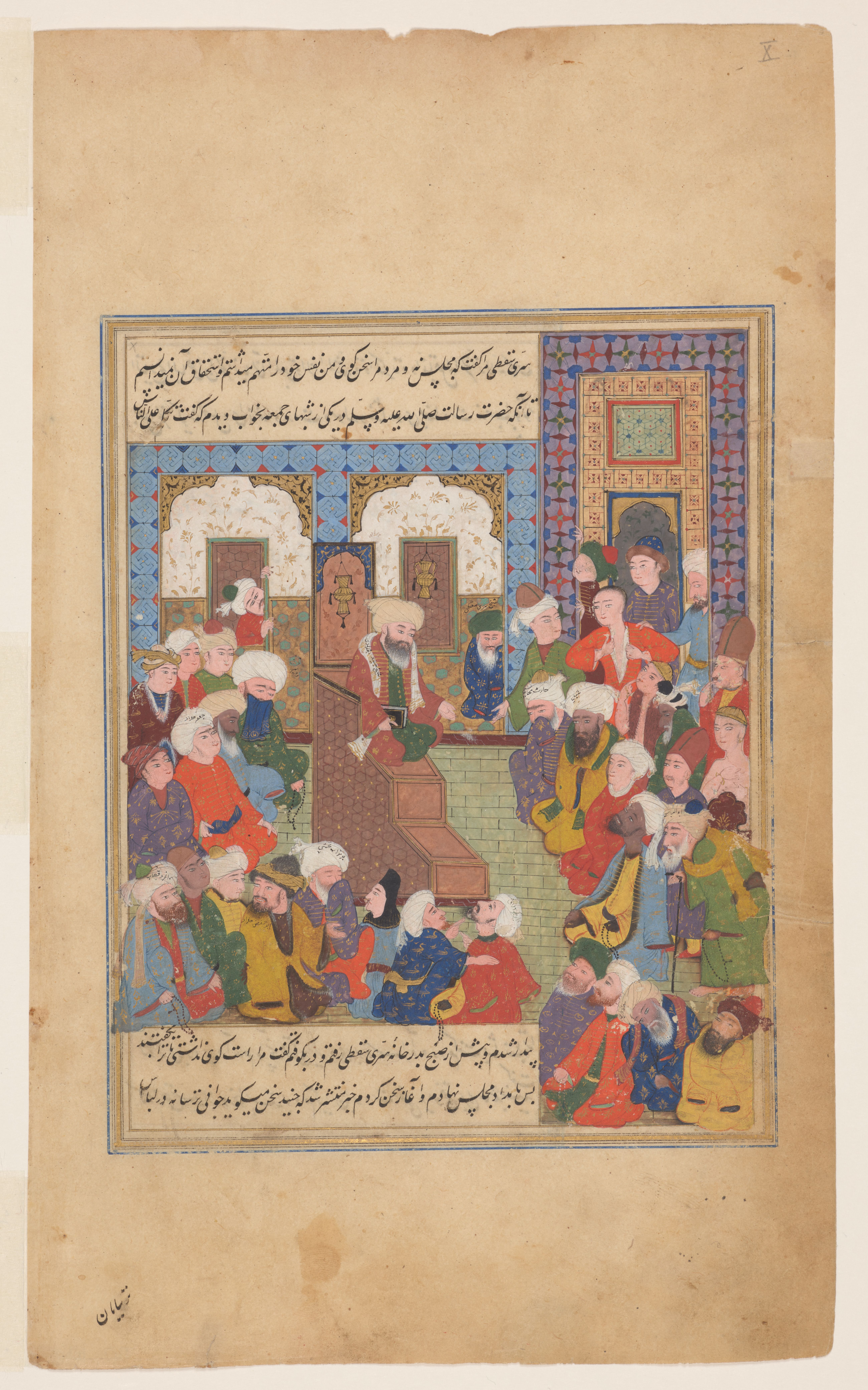
- Junayd of Baghdad invites the Christian youth to accept Islam at the Sufi meeting, witnessed by Saqati, from "Breaths of intimacy" (Nafaḥāt al-uns), by Jami (d. 1492). Persian-language manuscript created in Ottoman-held Baghdad, dated 1595
- Title: Sayyid at-Taifa

Personal life
- Born: c. 830 Baghdad, Abbasid Caliphate
- Died: 910 (aged 79–80) Baghdad, Abbasid Caliphate
- Main interest(s): Sufism, ishq, theology, philosophy, logic, fiqh
- Notable idea: Ishq

Religious life
- Religion: Islam
- Denomination: Sunni
- Jurisprudence: Shafi'i

Muslim leader
- Influenced by: Abu Thawr, Harith al-Muhasibi, Sari al-Saqati
- Influenced: Abu Bakr Shibli, Khwaja Mumshad Uluw Al Dīnawarī

Junayd of Baghdad (Persian: جُنیدِ بَغدادی; Arabic: الجنيد البغدادي; c. 830–910; AH 298), also known as Abū l-Qāsim al-Junaid, was a Muslim mystic, Sufi teacher, and one of the most renowned early Islamic saints. He was a major figure in the development of Sufi doctrine, laid foundations for much of the subsequent development of Sufism, and occupies a central position in the spiritual lineages of many Sufi orders. He taught in Baghdad throughout his life and was widely revered by his students and disciples and frequently cited by later mystics. Because of his importance in Sufi theology, he was often referred to as the "Sultan".

Junayd studied within the Shāfiʿī school of law in Baghdad and first encountered Sufism through his uncle, Sarīʿ al-Saqaṭī. He was subsequently instructed by al-Muḥāsibī. From both teachers he derived a strong insistence that Sufi experience should remain governed by religious law and orthodox belief and conduct. He consequently distanced himself from the more extreme pronouncements associated with mystics such as al-Ḥallāj, whom he nevertheless influenced, and became known as an advocate of "sober Sufism".

Little of Junayd's own writing survives, apart from fragments collected under the general title Rasāʾil ("Epistles"). He taught that, since all things derive from God as their creator, they ultimately return to and live in God; for the Sufi, this return is anticipated in the state of fanāʾ.

== Early life and education ==
The exact birth date of Abu-l-Qāsim al-Junayd ibn Muḥammad ibn al-Junayd al-Khazzāz al-Qawārīrī (Arabic: أبو القاسم الجنيد بن محمد الخزاز القواريري) is disputed and ranges from 210 to 215 AH according to Abdel-Kader. His death is more certain and ranges from 296 to 298 AH (908 to 910 CE). Junayd was a Persian, with his ancestors originating in Nihawand in modern-day Iran. Al-Junayd was raised by his uncle Sirri Saqti after being orphaned as a boy. Al-Junayd's early education included teachings from Abū Thawr, Abū 'Ubayd, al-Ḥārith al-Muḥãsibī, and Sarī ibn Mughallas.

== Hagiography ==
As to the hagiography by Attar of Nishapur, the Tazkirat al-Awliya, had felt the pain of divine separation since childhood. Regardless of spiritual sorrow, he was known for his quick understanding and discipline when Sirri Saqti accepted him. According to Attar, Junayd was only seven years of age when Sirri Saqti took him along for the Hajj. In al-Masjid an-Nabawi, there were 400 sheikhs discussing the concept of ‘thankfulness’ whereby each expounded his own view. When Sirri Saqti told him to present his definition, Junayd said, "Thankfulness means that should not disobey God by means of the favour which he has bestowed upon you nor make of His favour a source of disobedience." The sheikhs unanimously agreed that no other words could define the term better. Sirri Saqti asked Junayd from where he could learn all this. Junayd replied, "From sitting with you."

== Spiritual journey ==
His traditional hagiography continues by stating that Junayd went back to Baghdad and took up selling glasses. However, he spent most of his time in prayer. Hence, he retired to the porch of Sirri Saqti's house and kept himself away from worldly matters, devoting his thoughts solely to God. People need to "relinquish natural desires, to wipe out human attributes, to discard selfish motives, to cultivate spiritual qualities, to devote oneself to true knowledge, to do what is best in the context of eternity, to wish good for the entire community, to be truly faithful to God, and to follow the Prophet in the matters of the Shari’a." This starts with the practice of asceticism (zuhd) and continues with withdrawal from society, intense concentration on devotion (ibadah) and remembrance (dhikr) of God, sincerity (ikhlas), and contemplation (muraqaba) respectively; contemplation produces fana.

Junayd spent 40 years on his mystic course praying while sacrificing his sleep and any other worldly desires, but then a conceit in his heart arose that he had achieved his goal. By then he was inspired by God that "He who is not worthy of union, all his good works are but sins." This meant that the prayers which become a source of pride are useless, as true prayer makes a person more humble and devoted to God. His name became famous in many parts of the world despite the persecution he faced and the tongues of slander shot at him. Even then, he did not start preaching until 30 of the great saints indicated to him that he should now call men to God. However, he chose not to preach yet, saying, "While the master is there, it is not seemly for the disciple to preach." After witnessing Muhammad in his dream commanding him to preach, he had to listen to Sirri Saqti. The intensity of ishq poured out of the speech of Junayd such that out of the 40 people he first preached, 18 died and 22 fainted. His caliph and dearest disciple was Abu Bakr Shibli.

== Works by Junayd ==
Junayd helped establish the "sober" school of Sufi thought, which meant that he was very logical and scholarly about his definitions of various virtues, tawhid, etc. Sober Sufism is characterized by people who "experience fana [and] do not subsist in that state of selfless absorption in God but find themselves returned to their senses by God. Such returnees from the experience of selflessness are thus reconstituted as renewed selves," just like an intoxicated person sobering up. For example, Junayd is quoted as saying, "The water takes on the color of the cup." While this might seem rather confusing at first, ‘Abd al-Hakeem Carney explains it as: "When the water is understood here to refer to the Light of Divine self-disclosure, we are led to the important concept of 'capacity,' whereby the Divine epiphany is received by the heart of any person according to that person’s particular receptive capacity and will be 'colored' by that person’s nature".

Also, according to Sells, "Junayd seems to presuppose that his hearer or reader has had the experience about which he is speaking – or, even more radically, that the hearer or reader is able to enter that experience, or some re-creation of it – at the moment of encounter with Junayd's words." This statement makes it seem like Junayd was writing to a specific sect of the elite that he described earlier. The elite that he refers to are the elect, or "a tightly knit group of 'brethren' that Junayd designates by such phrases as 'the choice of believers' or 'the pure ones'. They play significant roles in the community of believers."

== See also ==
- List of Sufis
- Sari al-Saqati
- Harith al-Muhasibi
- Muhammad Muslehuddin Siddiqui
- Suhrawardiyya
- Seyyed Qutb al-Din Mohammad Neyrizi
