= Sehwan Fort =

Historic fortification in Sindh

- قلعہ سیہون
- Sehwan, Sindh in Pakistan

Site information
- Condition: Protected Monument

Location
- Coordinates: 26°26′01″N 67°51′43″E

Sehwan Fort (Urdu: قلعہ سیہون), known locally as Ulti Basti, is a ruined fort situated in Sehwan, Sindh, Pakistan.

== History ==
The origins of Sehwan Fort predate the common era, with legend attributing its construction to Alexander the Great, thus it is occasionally referred to as Alexander Fort. In a notable historical event, the fort was captured in 713 CE by Muhammad ibn al-Qasim following his defeat of Raja Dahir. Over the centuries, it has served as a protective bastion for numerous rulers.

Lieutenant William Edwards of the British Army also mentioned the fort in his book Sketches in Scinde, noting that its construction suggests Greek architectural influence, implying that Alexander the Great may have passed through the region.

In 2002, French archaeologist Professor Monique Kervran excavated the Sehwan Fort site. The artifacts found during the excavation were placed in the Sehwan Museum under the supervision of Mazhar Ali Mirani, who was then serving as the Assistant Director of the Department of Archaeology.

== Folk tale ==
A traditional folk tale associated with Sehwan Fort recounts the tyranny of Raja Chopt, who resided in the fort and martyred Bodla Bahar, a special servant of Lal Shahbaz Qalandar. In retaliation, Lal Shahbaz Qalandar forcefully smashed his kishkul to the ground, causing such upheaval that the entire settlement was upended. Consequently, the area became known as Ulti Basti.

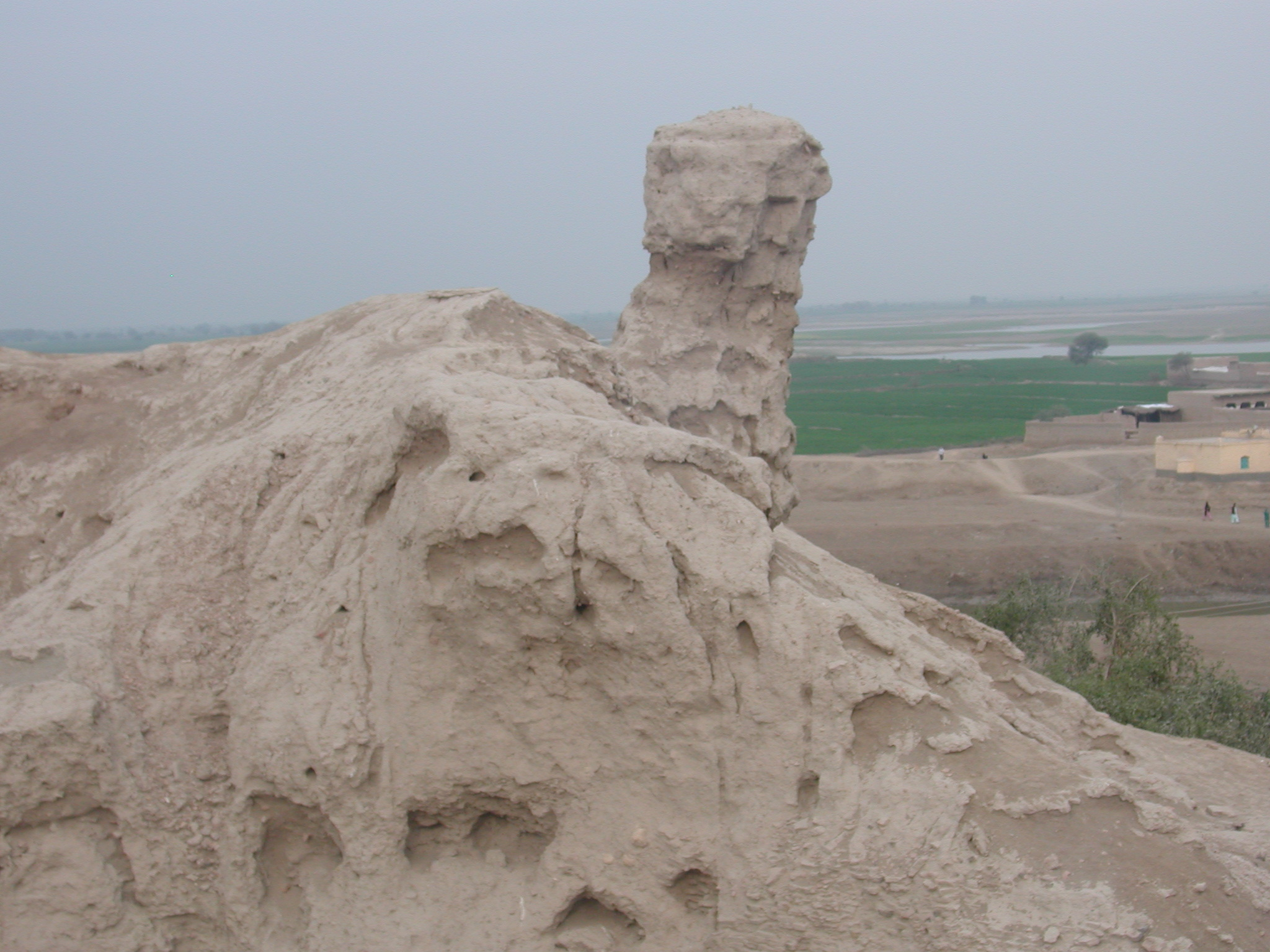
Edge of Sehwan Fort

== Architecture ==
The fort, covering a length of 1.27 kilometers and a height of 15 meters, currently stands as a mound approximately 400 meters by 200 meters and 18 meters high. The remains are characterized by an accumulation of potsherds, brick debris, bones, charcoal, and ash, indicating prolonged human activity and occupation.
