= Ismat Shahjahan =

Politician and social activist (b. 1963)

- عصمت شاہ جہان
- Born: Ismat Raza Shahjahan; May 6, 1963 (age 63); Takht-e-Nasrati, Karak District, Khyber Pakhtunkhwa, Pakistan
- Education: International Institute of Social Studies of Erasmus University Rotterdam; University of Peshawar
- Occupations: Political activist, socialist, feminist
- Years active: 1983 – present
- Known for: Women Democratic Front; Awami Workers Party; Pashtun Tahafuz Movement
- Notable work: Pashto magazine Leekwal (published in 1992); Urdu magazine Nariwad (published in 2018)

Ismat Raza Shahjahan (Pashto/Urdu: عصمت رضا شاہ جہان; b. May 6, 1963) is a socialist-feminist political leader from Khyber Pakhtunkhwa, Pakistan. She is the president of Women Democratic Front (WDF), the deputy general-secretary of the Awami Workers Party (AWP), and a leading member of the Pashtun Tahafuz Movement (PTM).

She ran for the National Assembly seat NA-54 (Islamabad-III) in the 2018 Pakistani general election.

== Early life and education ==
Shahjahan belongs to Takht-e-Nasrati in Karak District, Khyber Pakhtunkhwa, Pakistan. She did her Bachelor of Arts in law and political science from Jinnah College for Women, University of Peshawar, and also studied public administration at the University of Peshawar. She studied development studies at the International Institute of Social Studies (ISS) of Erasmus University Rotterdam (EUR) in The Hague, Netherlands.

She has worked as an international finance specialist at the Asian Development Bank (ADB) in Islamabad.

Shahjahan's son, Sparlay Rawail, is a lead guitarist in Khumariyaan, a Pashto music band.

== Political beginnings ==
Shahjahan was born into a progressive family that had supported the Pashtun leader, Abdul Ghaffar Khan (Bacha Khan), in his nonviolent Khudai Khidmatgar resistance movement against the British Raj. Shahjahan gained political consciousness since very early in her life. She started revolutionary politics as a university student leader in 1983, during the era of Zia-ul-Haq’s martial law, when there was ban on student unions. In 1986, she joined the left-wing Democratic Students Federation (DSF), and then the Communist Party of Pakistan (CPP). She worked actively with the Muttahida Labour Federation (MLF). During her time with the CPP, she also established the provincial front of the Democratic Women's Association (DeWA) in Khyber Pakhtunkhwa (then known as the North-West Frontier Province).

=== Ideology ===
Shahjahan’s entire life revolved around progressive political struggle. She has remained part of democratic movements against anti-state oppression, dictatorships and anti-war campaigns. Shahjahan is described as a socialist, feminist and anti-imperialist. Through her political ideologies and organizations, AWP and WDF, she aims to provide aid to the ignored societies of Pakistan by unifying their struggles. This includes the struggles of women, students, workers, peasants, and ethnic and religious minorities. Throughout her political struggle, she remained on frontlines of the feminist struggle and class struggle.

== Political career ==
=== Awami Workers Party ===
Shajahan played an important role in merger of three smaller leftist outfits (Labour Party, the Awami Party and the Workers Party) to form a progressive force Awami Workers Party in November, 2012 as a platform to rebuild the political Left. She is now the deputy general secretary of the party and aims to promote progressive politics in Pakistan.

In 2014, as a feminist from the left wing politics, she, along with other party workers, drafted a document about guiding principles of the party’s position on issues central to the liberation of women. In the document, elimination of all economic, social and administrative structures was demanded, that lead to gender-based exploitation. It asked 33 percent representation of women in all units of the party.

=== General elections 2018 ===
Shajahan contested for the 2018 Pakistani general election on National assembly seat NA-54 in federal capital Islamabad. Her electoral campaign included the vision to ensure katchi abadis (informal settlements) get official land titles and to get water for Islamabad. Awami Workers Party is working since a long time on the issue. The party wants to legislate to provide them protection. She said, "Our support base is largely in the katchi abadis. Their women go to the rich houses to work as domestic help. Their children, especially girls, care for the children of the rich. I want these women to be recognised under the purview of the labour law. Their girls suffer a lot of sexual abuse at these big houses and it goes unreported.”

=== Women Democratic Front ===
Shahjahan is involved in building a socialist feminist movement, from the platform of the Women Democratic Front. She is serving as president of WDF which was founded after ‘Aurat Azadi March (2018)’, being celebrated on International Women's Day, 2018 when a large number of working women, political workers, students and intellectuals gathered to inaugurate this organization. During the Aurat Azadi March 2018, in Islamabad which was held from press club to Nazimud Din Road, Shahjahan as president WDF said that the Constitution calls for gender equality but the laws and policies of our country are based on discrimination, gender inequality and violence.

=== Aurat Azadi March ===
Shahjahan's feminist organization WDF along with Awami Workers Party (AWP), Women Action Forum, Women’s Collective and Haqooq-e-Khalq Movement, Jammu and Kashmir Nationalist Students Front and other organizations also organized Aurat Azadi March, 2019 on International Women's Day, 2019.

Shahjahan also took part in organizing Aurat Azadi March 2020 in Islamabad despite facing threats from the right wing parties. For Aurat Azadi March 2020, Shahjahan wrote the anthem song “Hum Inquilab Hain” (We are Revolution). Shajahan got hit with a brick during Aurat Azadi March 2020 Islamabad by the religious extremists. She along with other organizers of the march called press conference after the march and demanded from government to take action against those who attacked on march.

=== Pashtun Tahafuz Movement ===
The Pashtun Tahafuz Movement (PTM) emerged at the start of 2018 with marches demanding the end of extrajudicial executions and enforced disappearances committed by security forces against Pashtuns living in Khyber Pakhtunkhwa and northern Balochistan along the border with Afghanistan.

In May 2018, Shahjahan was nominated as a representative of the PTM's reconciliatory jirga for negotiations with the state institutions.

On 18 January 2019, a video surfaced in which a 13-year-old boy, Hayat Khan from Khaisor, North Waziristan, said Pakistani security forces had arrested his father and brother, and that his family had been facing harassment due to frequent visits by two security personnel to his home when he was the only male among the females present at home. On 27 January, Shahjahan visited Khaisor along with five other female PTM activists, Gulalai Ismail, Bushra Gohar, Jamila Gilani, Sanna Ejaz and Nargis Afsheen Khattak, to express solidarity with Hayat's mother and to also interview the local women about other incidents of sexual harassment. Shahjahan said, "[dozens of] women came out of their homes when we visited them, pleaded and cried, and asked us to help them bring their missing sons back. We cried with them." Gulalai Ismail said that due to the bombing of their homes by the armed forces, "the mental health of women from the tribal areas has deteriorated so much that they cannot endure another day of war.”

=== Detentions ===
On 21 April 2018, a night before the PTM public gathering in Lahore, the police arrested Shahjahan along with several other leading activists, including AWP president Fanoos Gujjar and PTM leader Ali Wazir. As a result of protests in various parts of the country and a social media campaign for them, they were released within hours. The arrests were criticized by the public and notable politicians, including Maryam Nawaz, Pervaiz Rashid, and Bilawal Bhutto Zardari.

On 28 January 2020, Shahjahan and 28 other protesters, including PTM leader Mohsin Dawar and Ammar Rashid, were arrested by the police outside the National Press Club in Islamabad, where they had gathered to stage a protest against the arrest of PTM chairman Manzoor Pashteen, who had been arrested in Peshawar a day earlier on allegations of sedition. Shahjahan and Mohsin Dawar were released on 29 January but Ammar Rashid and 22 others were sent to jail on sedition charges. The protesters appealed to the Islamabad High Court where they were granted bail by chief justice Athar Minallah on 3 February. Minallah summoned the Islamabad City Magistrate and asked an explanation for first placing sedition charges on peaceful protesters and later turning them into terrorism charges in the first information report. The charges were dropped against all 23 of them on 17 February. Manzoor Pashteen was also released from jail on 25 February.

== Magazines ==
She remained a publisher of the well-known progressive revolutionary Pashto journal Leekwal in 1992. In 2018, she launched her own feminist-socialist magazine named Nariwad, from the platform of WDF, that highlights the importance of rights of women facing oppression and injustice.
