= Tooba Syed =

Pakistani writer, feminist political organiser and gender researcher (born 1991)

- طوبیٰ سید
- Born: Tooba Syed; May 29, 1991 (age 35); Islamabad, Pakistan
- Occupations: Feminist, Researcher
- Known for: Secretary of Women Democratic Front

Tooba Syed (Urdu: طوبیٰ سید, born May 29, 1991) is a Pakistani feminist organiser, writer, and gender researcher. She is the secretary information and publishing of the feminist organization Women Democratic Front.

== Activism ==
Syed is associated with left-wing politics since 2012 when she participated in arranging study circles at the university in Islamabad. She worked in anti-eviction housing rights movement in Islamabad’s katchi abadis (informal settlements) with the All Pakistan Alliance for Katchi Abadis, protesting when the Capital Development Authority decided to demolish twelve such settlements in the capital.

Syed has also organized the landless peasants movement and Okara’s women’s resistance movement. Syed arranged political schools to deepen the understanding of methods of organizing progressive political resistance in Pakistan along with social, economic and political structures of inequality and oppression. Syed also worked with the Awami Workers Party.

=== Feminism ===
As a feminist, Syed is interested in feminist theory, its practice, issues of women, gender and politics of South Asia. Syed, supported the Me Too movement in Pakistan while describing the incident of Khaisore. She supported Sheema Kermani’s Dhamal in Sehwan, after the attack (Feb, 2017) on shrine of Lal Shahbaz Qalandar. Syed organized an event on International Women’s Day 2017 and invited South Asian feminist Kamla Bhasin.

=== Women Democratic Front ===
Syed is the secretary of the socialist-feminist women collective and organization Women Democratic Front (WDF). The group was founded along with other left-wing workers from across country with an aim to involve the working-class women in political struggle and ensure their representation from federal to basic unit levels. In 2018, under the banner of WDF, Syed condemned the Khyber Pakhtunkhwa (KP) government order of banning media coverage of all events in females’ schools across KP province. As a WDF member Syed participated in women's emancipation march 2018, 2019 and 2020.
