= Alya Bakhshal =

Pakistani feminist, political worker and organizer (born 1978)

- عالیہ بخشل
- Born: Alya Bakhshal; June 3, 1978 (age 48)
- Occupations: Political worker, organizer
- Known for: Feminist, General Secretary Women Democratic Front, Women Secretary Awami Workers Party, Sindh

Alya Bakhshal (Urdu: عالیہ بخشل, born June 3, 1978) is a Pakistani feminist, political worker and organizer. She is general secretary of the Women Democratic Front and women secretary of Awami Workers Party, Sindh.

== Politics ==
Bakhshal is a socialist feminist organizer belonging from Khairpur Mirs, Sindh, Pakistan and currently living in Hyderabad, Sindh.

Bakhshal is a senior and leading member of the Awami Workers Party (AWP) and is serving as women secretary AWP Sindh.

== Feminism ==
Bakhshal’s political struggle and feminism started when she joined Women's Action Forum. Later she joined Awami Workers Party. She is among the founders of the Nari Jamhoori Mahaz (Women Democratic Front). a socialist feminist organizations which started the Aurat Azadi March (Women's Freedom March) movement in 2018 to celebrate International Women's Day every year and Nariwad Magazine.

Bakhshal is serving as general secretary women democratic front. As WDF active member, she has organized many political schools and study circles throughout Sindh to organize working class of Sindhi women. During the pandemic, she raised her voice from WDF forum on vulnerability of healthcare workers working class, and domestic violence against women. She was among the organizers of student march 2020 where she demanded that the restoration of students' unions as democratic right.

Bakhshal along with other members of women democratic front is organizing the Aurat Azadi March in Sindh since 2018.

== See also ==
- Women in Pakistan
- Feminism in Pakistan
