= Abdullah Shah Ghazi =

8th-century Muslim mystic and Sufi

Shah Ghazi Abdullah Shah Ghazi
- عبداللہ شاہ غازی
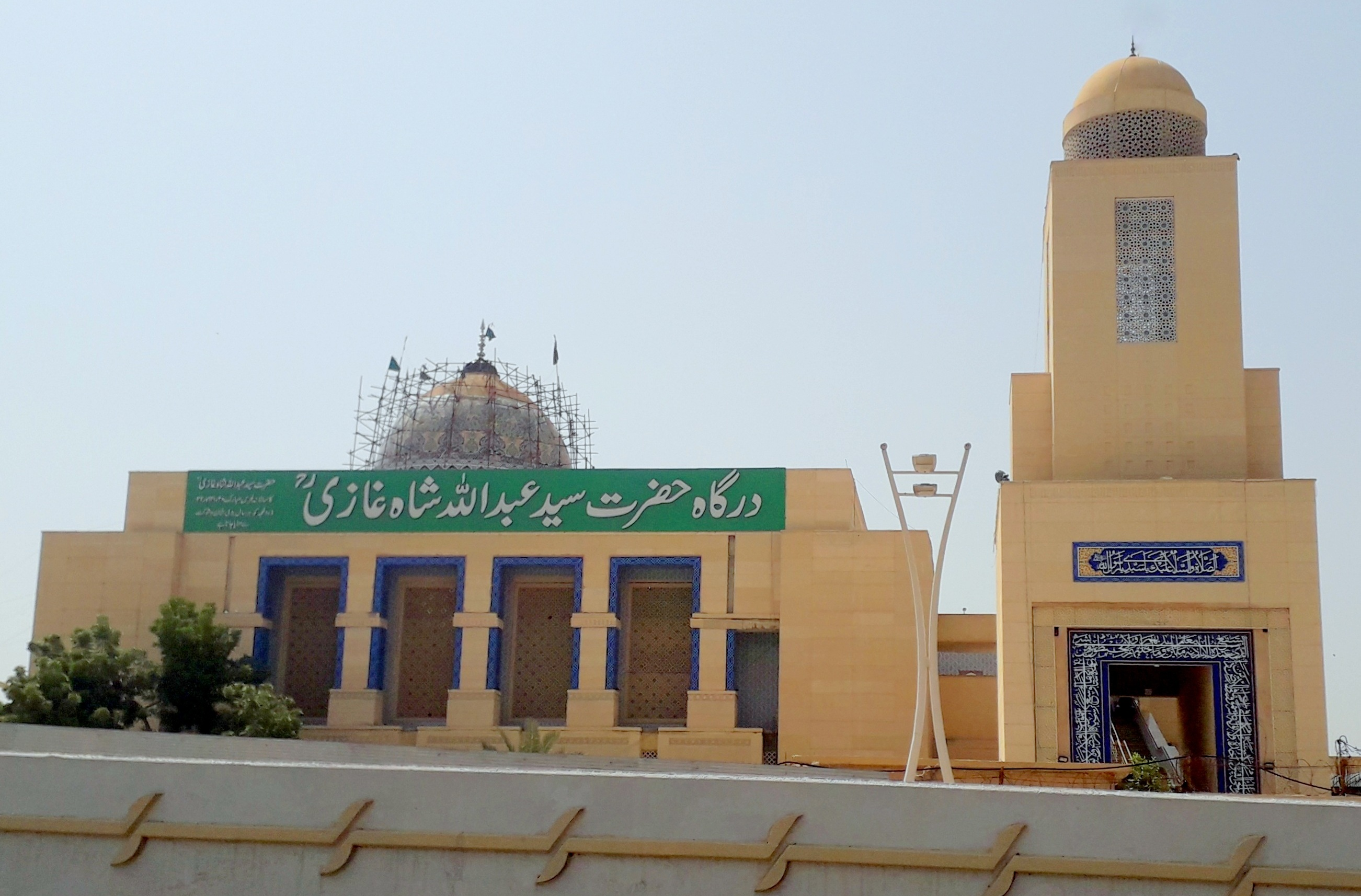
- The shrine of Abdullah Shah Ghazi in Karachi, Pakistan, originally built by Murshid Nadir Ali Shah of Sehwan Sharif

Personal life
- Born: 98 AH (720 CE)
- Died: 151 AH; 773 (aged 52–53) CE
- Known for: Sufi mysticism

Religious life
- Religion: Islam

Muslim leader
- Period in office: 8th century

Abdullah Shah Ghazi (Arabic: عبد الله شاه غازي, romanized: ʿAbd Allāh Shāh Ghāzī) (c. 720 – c. 773) was a Muslim mystic and Sufi whose shrine is located in Clifton in Karachi, in Sindh province of Pakistan.

== Biography ==
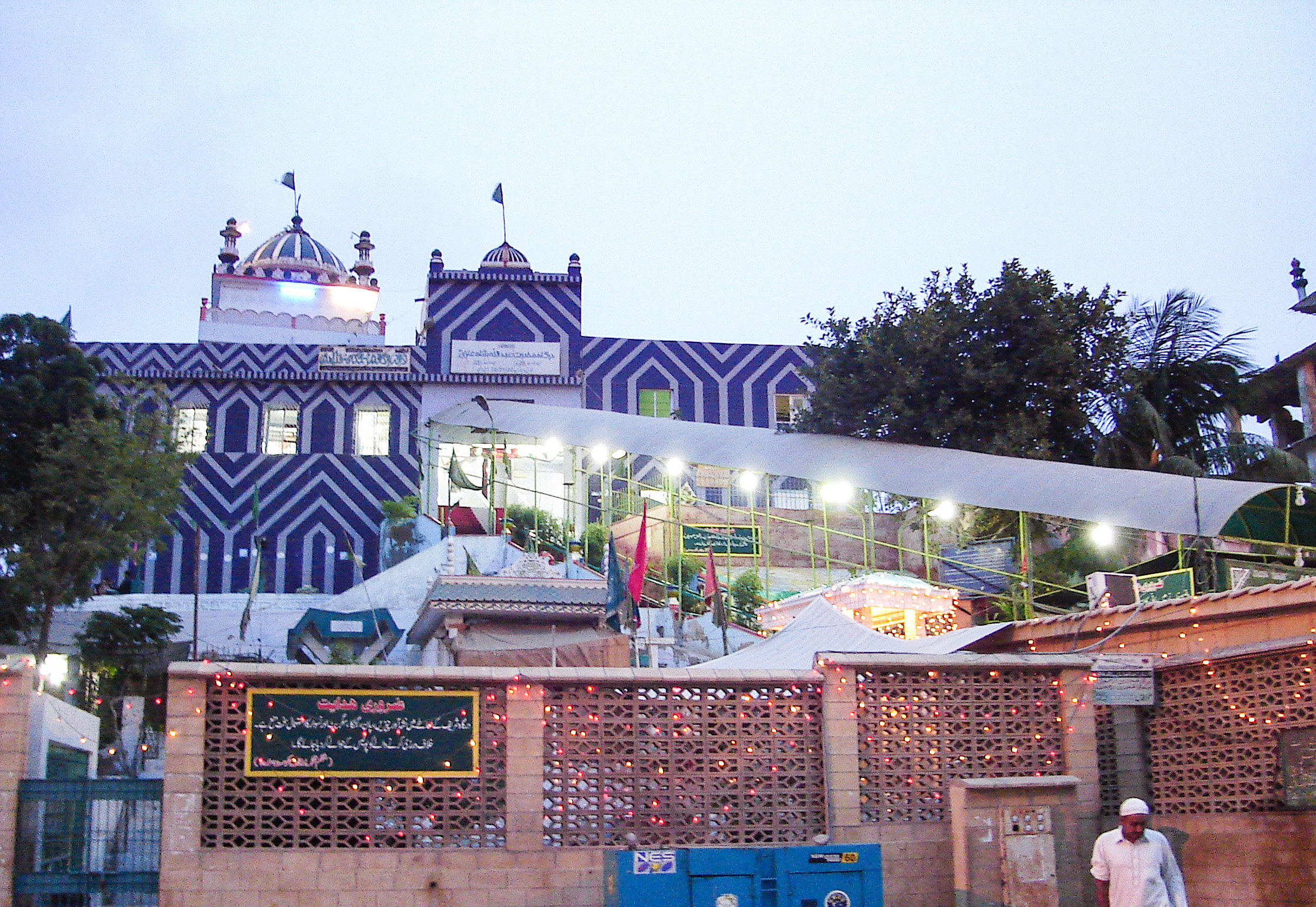
Old Shrine before renovation

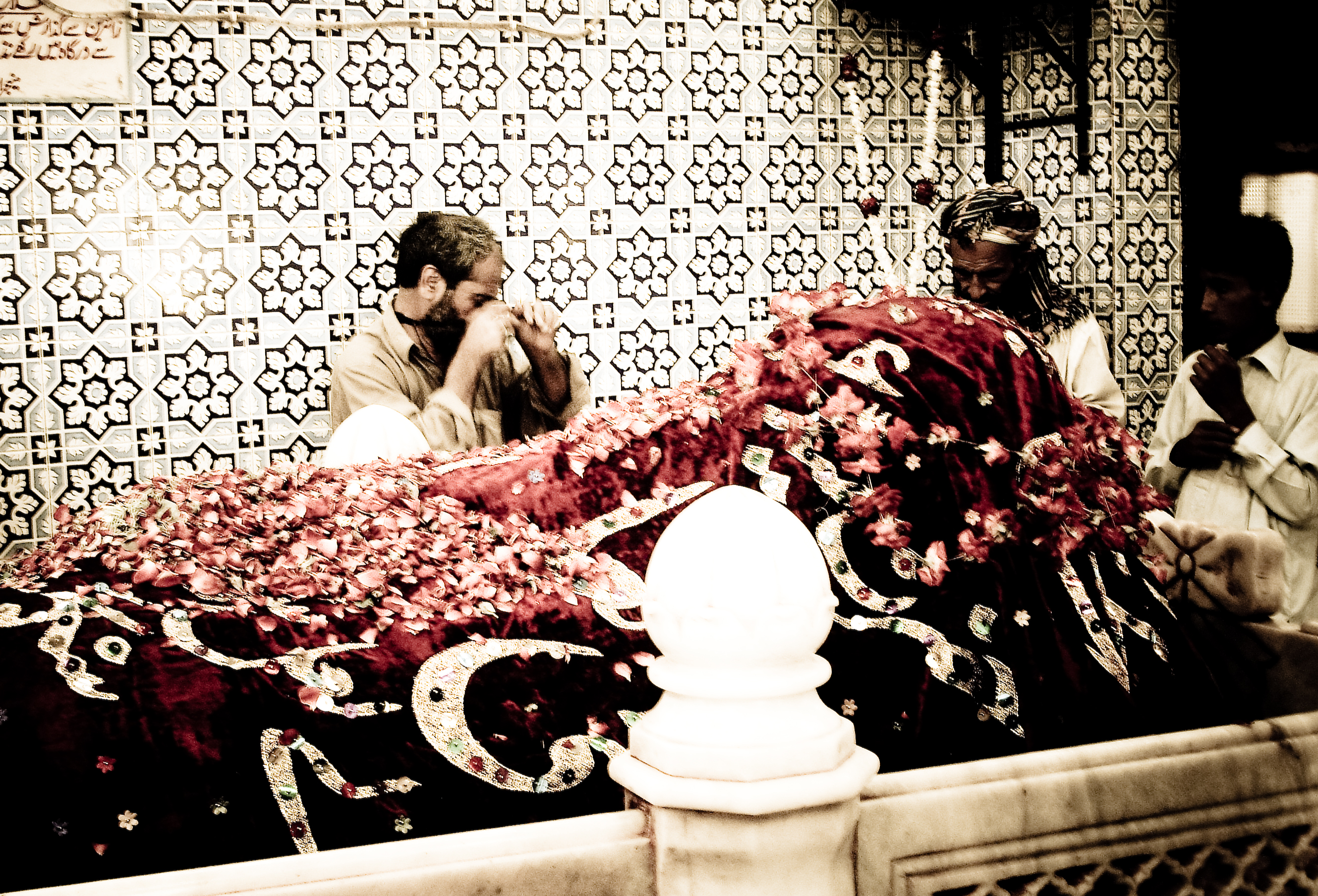
Inside the shrine of the Abdullah Shah Ghazi

Abdullah Shah Ghazi was born in 98 or 109 Hijri. In 738 CE, he arrived in Karachi during rule of the Umayyad Caliphate. Sohail Lari suggested in his book, A History of Sindh, that Abdullah was an Arab merchant who had come to Sindh with the first wave of Arab conquerors. However another historian, M. Daudpota, suggested that Abdullah arrived from Iraq as a commander, who along with Muhammad ibn al-Qasim, and fought against Raja Dahir, in the eighth century. Abdullah Shah Ghazi was said to have been killed in a forest in the Sindh by his enemies. His devotees buried his body on top of a hill in a coastal area, where he had earlier arrived on an Arab ship. This area now lies in the vicinity of Clifton and Sea View in Karachi.

== Shrine ==
The tomb is constructed on an elevated platform, while the body is laid to rest in a subterranean crypt. The shrine comprises a tall, square chamber adorned with Sindhi tile work, flags, and buntings, crowned by a striking green-and-white striped dome. Devotees often touch the silver railing surrounding the burial site, and adorn it with floral garlands.

Until the early twentieth century, the shrine stood as a humble hut atop a sandy hill in Clifton. It was Nadir Ali Shah, a revered Sufi saint belonging to the Qalandariyya Sufi Order of Lal Shahbaz Qalandar, who became the custodian of the shrine and played a pivotal role in its construction and development. Under his supervision, the iconic dome of the shrine, the windowed ambulatory, the mosque, the free kitchens or Langar Khana, the Qawwali court, and the pilgrim lodge within its premises were constructed. Additionally, a long stairway leading to the shrine was built. His efforts transformed the shrine into a center of spirituality and community service. Over the years, the shrine has become a magnet for people from various sects, ethnicities, and sections of society, who are drawn to its spiritual aura and devotion. The shrine's distinct features, such as the provision of free meals and soul-stirring Qawwali performances, have long been maintained in connection with Syed Nadir Ali Shah's dervish lodge, known as Kafi Sakhi Sarwar, in Sehwan Sharif. In 1962, the administrative control of the shrine was transferred to the Auqaf department. Subsequently, in 2011, the shrine underwent a renovation of its exterior under the ownership of the Pakistani construction giant, Bahria Town. This renovation elicited mixed responses from the residents of Karachi.

The Abdullah Shah Ghazi shrine was attacked in 2010 by militants who detonated two suicide bombs at the shrine, killing 10 and injuring 50.

== Langar ==
The "langar," or free kitchen, provides meals three times a day, seven days a week, serving individuals in need. This initiative began in the 1930s by Syed Nadir Ali Shah, the shrine's custodian at the time. Following his passing in 1974, the tradition was continued by his successor, Syed Arif Ali Shah. This charitable service has been consistently upheld by his disciples ever since.

== Association with Abdullah al-Ashtar ==
Abdullah Shah Ghazi has also been associated with Abdullah al-Ashtar, a son of Muhammad al-Nafs al-Zakiyya who fled to Sindh after his father's rebellion in 762.

== See also ==
- List of mausoleums and shrines in Pakistan
- Gazi Pir
- Islam in South Asia
