= Ayub Khattak =

Pakistani journalist

Ayub Khan Khattak
- Born: ca. 1971
- Died: October 11, 2013; Takht-e-Nasrati area
- Cause of death: Shot
- Burial place: Warana Mir Hassankhel village in Takht-e-Nusrati tehsil
- Occupation: Journalist
- Years active: 9 years
- Employer(s): The Karak Times and the Daily Jang
- Known for: Reporting on criminal elements in his region
- Spouse: Wife
- Children: Two sons
- Relatives: Brother

Ayub Khan Khattak, (ca. 1971 – October 11, 2013), a Pakistani journalist for the Karak Times in the southern Karak District of the Khyber Pakhtunkhwa administrative province and for the Daily Jang out of Karachi, specialized in crime in his region before he was killed.

== Personal ==
Ayub Khattak lived in the village of Warana near Takht-e-Nasrati, in the Karak District. He is survived by his wife and the couple had two older sons, one of which was Shamsur Rehman, out of 10 children. He also has a brother Mukhtiar Khan. Ayub Khan Khattak was buried in his ancestral graveyard at Warana Mir Hassankhel village in Takht-e-Nusrati tehsil on Saturday October 12, 2013.

== Career ==
Khattak was a journalist for the Karak Times and the Daily Jang. He got his start in journalism in 2004 and had been a journalist for nine years at the time of his murder. He was no stranger to threats and often received threats as a result of his reports that exposed criminal elements in his region. According to Ayub Khattak's colleagues, he had recently published an article on a local gang of drug dealers and their sale of illegal drugs.

== Death ==
Takht-e-Nasarati Tehsil, within Pakistan, is shown relative to the capital Islamabad.

Ayub Khattak was leaving his home on October 11, 2013, to go to his newspaper's office when he was shot by two men on motorcycles who were waiting outside of his house. The two men fatally shot him down right outside of his door. Khattak died instantly and the two men fled the scene. The assailants used a .30 bore pistol to kill Khattak. The weapon was a Kalashnikov.

As Ayub Khattak was being laid to rest his son Shamsur Rehman registered the first information report against the two killers. According to Khattak's brother, Mukhtiar Khan, the two accused, Aminullah and Khoob Niaz, were not happy with Khattak for publishing an article about drug smuggling in the area. Khattak had previously annoyed these same men and it was also alleged that Khattak had previously received death threats from the brothers. On March 16, 2016, Khattak's case was brought to court at the District and Sessions Court in Karak district of Pakistan. The judge, Syed Kamal Hussain Shah, acquitted Khoob Niaz due to lack of evidence. However, Aminullah was sentenced to life in prison and given a fine of Rs 5 million. Both Khattak's brother and his son were dissatisfied with the court's decision, and believe that both of the killers should have gotten the death sentence. Khattak's family said that they planned to appeal the acquittal of Khoob Niaz, and they had hoped for and now wanted a more harsh sentence for both of the brothers.

== Context ==
Khattak's murder came a few days after the Minister of Information, Pervaiz Rasheed, voiced his support for the appointment of a special prosecutor to investigate attacks made against journalists. This could have been in response to the United Nations Plan of Action on the Safety of Journalists and Issue of Impunity that was brought about at a meeting in Islamabad in October 2013.

Pakistan is said to be one of the most dangerous countries for journalists. Even though the government has made promises to protect journalists, the problem is still there and has gotten worse. Countless reporters have been kidnapped, beaten, and/or intimidated because of their work as journalists. Attackers seem to come from everywhere, it's not just criminals, it's also Pakistan's civilian and military intelligences agencies' personnel. The areas that are in the most trouble are the conflict-affected ones, like Khyber-Pakhtunkhwa, where Khattak worked. The IFJ has over 100 journalist murder cases recorded since 2000, but the murderer, Aminullah, has only been the third person to be convicted.

== Impact ==
Ayub Khattak wrote articles about the drug smuggling business and crime in his region to improve his province. After his death, his peers held rallies and protests that had people demanding their rights from their government. They were questioning Khattak's murder and wanted the killers to be found and brought to justice.

When Aminullah Niaz was finally convicted for Khattak's murder, that was a huge win for the journalism community, as many journalists' deaths are not something that gets much attention.

As the IFJ stated: the conviction for Khattak's murder is a step in the right direction, a step towards controlling the justice deserved for crimes against journalists in Pakistan. The IFJ accepts the conviction and supports the effort done by the Pakistan government and authorities to end the culture of violence and injustice.

== Reactions ==
The journalism community was outraged by the death of Ayub Khattak. The Karak Times community organized a protest rally for the death of their colleague. This protest was led by the senior journalist at the Karak Times, Shafiuddin and the Karak Union of Journalists. The protest took the form of a march, one that went from Peer Odeen Shah Masjid to the Saddam Chowk. The journalists that took part carried placards, chanted slogans, and demanded the arrest of Khattak's killers. These placards also had slogans written on them demanding protection for journalists. The protest ended up blocking traffic at the Karak-Bannu Road at Saddam Chowk, as they rallied there.

Members of civil society, local journalists, and workers of political parties in Ghalanai, also organized a protest. They were asking the government to look into Khattak's murder.

Yet another protest took place in Landi Kotal, this group of protesters was made up of the Khyber chapter of Tribal Union of Journalists, they were also demanding the arrest of Khattak's killers. This protest was led by Sajid Afridi, the president of the TUJ's Khyber chapter. These protesters also chanted slogans, ones that were against the KP government for failing to provide protection to media persons. They demanded an objective, unbiased look into the murder of Ayub Khattak, they also urged the government to compensate Khattak's family.

== See also ==
- List of journalists killed during the Balochistan conflict (1947–present)
- Human rights in Pakistan
- Karak District
- Pakistan Federal Union of Journalists
