= Takht-e-Nasrati Tehsil =

Takht-e-Nasarati Tehsil تحصیل تخت نصرتی تخت نصرتي تحصیل
- Tehsil
- Country: Pakistan
- Province: Khyber Pakhtunkhwa
- District: Karak

Government
  - Nazim: Sajjad Ahmad Khattak (PTI)

Area
  - Total: 813 km^{2} (314 sq mi)

Population (2023)
  - Total: 298,151
- Time zone: UTC+5 (PST)
- Number of village councils: 21
- Number of Union Councils: 7

Takht-e-Nasarati is a tehsil of Karak District in Khyber Pakhtunkhwa province of Pakistan. The town of Takht-e-Nasrati is the headquarters of the tehsil. The Sheenghar and Sur Ghar mountains make borders with Mianwali District , Punjab on east side while Lakki Marwat to south, Bannu district to the west and Karak on the north side.

== Administration ==
The tehsil is administratively subdivided into 21 Village councils. These are:

- Takht-e-Nasrati Bala
- Takht-e-Nasrati Payan
- Bogara
- Ganderi Khattak
- Shahedan banda
- Sarki Lawaghar
- Siraj Khel
- Nara
- Kiri Dhand
- Shah Salim
- Chokara
- Ahmad Abad
- Ghundi Kalla
- Surati Kalla
- Saikot
- Warrana Mir Hassan Khel
- Warrana Musakan
- Tattar Khel
- Jehangiri Banda
- Yaghi Musakan
- Khojaki

== Mouza’s in Takht-e-Nasrati ==
There are 17 mouza’s in Takht-e-Nasrati.

== Patwar Halqa’s ==
It is divided into 11 patwar Halqa’s and 2 Qanungoi circles. The Patwar halqa’s are

- Mina khel
- Shnawa Gudi Khel
- Shah Salim
- Mianki
- Khojaki
- Takht-e-Nasrati
- Tattar Khel
- Surati Kalla
- Warrana Ahmad Abad
- Chokara
- Wanki Siraj khel

The two Qanungoi circles are

- Takht-e-Nasrati
- Warrana Ahmad Abad

== Educational Institutions ==
The literacy rate of Takht-e-Nasrati was 69.55% as per 2023 census more than it neighbouring tehsils in Karak. Takht e Nasrati have many notable public sector educational institutes which include

- Government degree college Takht e Nasrati
- Government degree college Ahmad Abad
- Government Polytechnic institute Amberi Kalla
- Government College of management sciences Amberi Kalla
- Petroleum institute Amberi Kalla

Takht e Nasrati tehsil have a plethora of private sector schools, colleges, degree colleges, Colleges for allied health sciences in Chokara which have a fruitful result in 86.6% of male literacy rate as per 2023 census.

== Transportation ==
The N-55 Indus Highway goes through the middle of takht-e-Nasrati with approximate length of 20 kilometres. All the other roads are connected to this main highway. Other major roads include Takht-e-Nasrati road starting from Amberi kalla to Takht-e-Nasrati with approximate length of 12 kilometres and further extended to Abbasi Banda, Khojaki kalla to ahmad Abad road, Warrana to Ahmad Abad road, Zarkhan Kalla to Inzar Morh, Inzar morh to Hamidan Road and Mirdal Band to Yaghi Musakan Road.

== Festivals ==
Takht-e-Nasrati holds many festivals which provide recreational opportunities and groceries at low prices and many festivities alongside exhibition of culture. The main festivals includes

- Friday Festival - on every friday in Ahmad Abad also known as Lund Kamar Mela or Juma Mela
- Saturday Festival- happens on every Saturday in Takht-e-Nasrati also known as Taati mela or Awaal Mela
- Monday Festival - happens on every Friday Monday in Machaki Kalla locally known as Machaki Mela or Daryam Mela

== Notable people ==
- Shahid Ahmed Khattak - a politician, member of National Assembly of Pakistan for two consecutive tenures 2018 to 2023 & 2023 to 2028, also president of PTI South Khyber Pakhtunkhwa
- Akif Javed - cricketer who have represented Pakistan at a national level and played for Pakistan Super League franchises like Islamabad United and Multan Sultans and international franchises like Rangpur Riders and Fortune Barishal
- Malik Qasim Khan Khattak - politician died in 2025 and member of provincial assembly and advisor to chief Minister of Khyber Pakhtunkhwa
- Shah Abdul Aziz (politician) - politician and religious scholar and member of National Assembly of Pakistan from 2003 to 2008.
- Ismat Shahjahan - a socialist-feminist and politician

== Bazar’s & Market places ==
There is variety of market places in the tehsil for shopping purposes which includes

- Amberi kalla
- Takht-e-Nasrati Bazar
- Fatehsher Market
- Hamidan chowk
