= Zafar Azam =

Pakistani politician

- ظفر اعظم

Member of the Provincial Assembly of Khyber Pakhtunkhwa
- In office 13 August 2018 – 18 January 2023
- Constituency: PK-86 (Karak-II)
- In office 27 November 2002 – 10 October 2007
- Constituency: PF-41 Karak-II

Personal details
- Party: JUI (F) (1990-2008; 2018-present)
- Other political affiliations: MNA (2002-2007; 2018-2023); IND (2007-2013); PMLN (2013-2018)

Zafar Azam is a Pakistani politician who had been a member of the Provincial Assembly of Khyber Pakhtunkhwa from August 2018 to January 2023.

== Political career ==
Azam contested the 1988 North-West Frontier Province provincial election from PF-33 Karak-II as an independent candidate, but was unsuccessful. He received 12,188 votes and was defeated by Nawabzada Mohsin Ali Khan, a candidate of Islami Jamhoori Ittehad (IJI).

He contested the 1990 North-West Frontier Province provincial election from PF-33 Karak-II as a candidate of Jamiat Ulema-e-Islam (F) (JUI(F)), but was unsuccessful. He received 15,759 votes and was defeated by Nawabzada Mohsin Ali Khan, a candidate of IJI.

He was elected to the Provincial Assembly of the North-West Frontier Province in the 1993 North-West Frontier Province provincial election from PF-33 Karak-II as a candidate of Islami Jamhoori Mahaz. He received 15,012 votes and defeated Nawabzada Mohsin Ali Khan, a candidate of Pakistan Muslim League (N) (PML(N)).

He contested the 1997 Pakistani general election from NA-10 Karak as an independent candidate, but was unsuccessful. He received 5,845 votes and was defeated by Shams-ur-Rehman, a candidate of Awami National Party (ANP). He also contested the 1997 North-West Frontier Province provincial election from PF-33 Karak-II as a candidate of JUI(F), but was unsuccessful. He received 4,825 votes and was defeated by Nawabzada Mohsin Ali Khan, an independent candidate.

He was elected to the Provincial Assembly of the North-West Frontier Province in the 2002 North-West Frontier Province provincial election as a candidate of Muttahida Majlis-e-Amal (MMA) from PF-41 Karak-II. He received 13,931 votes and defeated Muhammad Ayub Khan, a candidate of Pakistan Muslim League (Q) (PML(Q)).

After not being nominated by his party, JUI(F), he contested the 2008 North-West Frontier Province provincial election from PF-41 Karak-II as an independent candidate, but was unsuccessful. He received 12,981 votes and was defeated by Malik Qasim Khan Khattak, a candidate of JUI(F).

He contested the 2013 Khyber Pakhtunkhwa provincial election as a candidate of PML(N) from PK-41 Karak-II, but was unsuccessful. He received 16,362 votes and was defeated by Malik Qasim Khan Khattak, an independent candidate.

He was re-elected to the Provincial Assembly of Khyber Pakhtunkhwa as a candidate of MMA from PK-86 (Karak-II) in the 2018 Khyber Pakhtunkhwa provincial election. He received 35,846 votes and defeated Malik Qasim Khan Khattak, a candidate of Pakistan Tehreek-e-Insaf (PTI).
