= Malik Qasim Khan Khattak =

Pakistani politician

Malik Qasim Khan Khattak MPA

Advisor on prison to Chief Minister of Khyber Pakhtunkhwa
- In office 19 June 2013 – 28 May 2018

Member of the Khyber Pakhtunkhwa Assembly
- In office 31 May 2013 – 28 May 2018
- Constituency: PK-41 Karak-II

Personal details
- Born: August 12, 1953 Karak District
- Died: April 5, 2025 (aged 71) Islamabad, Pakistan
- Other political affiliations: PTI (2013-2023)
- Parent: Malik Nasir Ali Khan Khattak (father)
- Occupation: Politician

Malik Qasim Khan Khattak (Urdu: ملک قاسم خان خٹک) was a Pakistani politician hailing from Karak District formerly belonging to Pakistan Tehreek-e-Insaf. He served as Adviser to the chief minister on prisons in the 10th Khyber Pakhtunkhwa Assembly.

He has also served as Deputy District Nazim, Karak prior to contesting Provincial Assembly in 2008 on ticket of JUI-F.

== Political career ==
Khan was elected in the 2013 Pakistani general election as an independent and later joined Pakistan Tehreek-e-Insaf. Qasim Khan failed as an independent candidate in 2018 and 2024 general elections.

• 2008 Elections: Khattak contested the 2008 general elections as a candidate of Jamiat Ulema-e-Islam (F) (JUI-F) but was unsuccessful.

• 2013 Elections: In the 2013 elections, he ran as an independent candidate from PK-41 Karak-II, won the seat, and subsequently joined Pakistan Tehreek-e-Insaf (PTI).

• Adviser Role: During his tenure from 2013 to 2018, he served as Adviser on Prisons to the Chief Minister of Khyber Pakhtunkhwa.

• Development Initiatives: Khattak was known for advocating development in his constituency, focusing on education, healthcare, and infrastructure.

• 2018 Elections: He contested the 2018 elections as a PTI candidate but was defeated by Zafar Azam of Muttahida Majlis-e-Amal (MMA).

• 2023 Resignation from PTI: In May 2023, Khattak resigned from PTI, citing disagreements over the party’s direction and internal justice, particularly in response to the events of May 9, 2023.

• Joining IPP: After leaving PTI, he joined the Istehkam-e-Pakistan Party (IPP).

Election Results:

- 2018: Defeated in PK-86 Karak-II; received 32,866 votes (34.27%), while Zafar Azam secured 35,846 votes (37.38%), leading to a margin of 2,980 votes.
- 2024: Contested as an independent candidate in PK-86 Karak-II; received 31,853 votes (31.12%), losing to Muhammad Sajjad of PTI, who secured 37,160 votes (36.31%).

Some political analysts suggested that dissatisfaction with governance and development projects may have contributed to his defeat in the 2018 and 2023 elections.

== Legacy ==
Malik Qasim Khan Khattak is remembered as a grassroots leader who played a prominent role in the political development of Karak District. Beginning his career as Deputy District Nazim, he built a reputation for being closely connected to the concerns of his constituents. His tenure as a Member of the Khyber Pakhtunkhwa Assembly from 2013 to 2018, and as an Adviser on Prisons to the Chief Minister, was marked by a focus on public service and developmental initiatives. He advocated for improvements in education, healthcare, and infrastructure, particularly in underserved areas of southern Khyber Pakhtunkhwa.

Khattak was widely respected for his independent political stance. Winning his 2013 seat as an independent candidate before joining Pakistan Tehreek-e-Insaf (PTI), he was seen as a pragmatic politician capable of balancing personal influence with party politics.

In May 2023, Khattak resigned from PTI, citing concerns over the party’s internal justice system and its response to the violent protests of May 9. His departure from the party was viewed by some political commentators as a principled stand, further bolstering his image as a leader of integrity.

Even in his later years, after electoral setbacks, Khattak remained a respected figure in regional politics. His legacy endures in Karak as that of a politician who combined tribal respect with a commitment to governance and public welfare.
