= Women Democratic Front =

Pakistani independent socialist-feminist organization

Women Democratic Front (WDF)
- ویمن ڈیموکریٹک فرنٹ
- Formation: 2018
- Type: Women's organization
- Purpose: Socialist Feminism
- Location: Pakistan
- General Secretary: Alya Bakhshal
- President: Ismat Shahjahan
- Website: wdfpk.org

Women Democratic Front (WDF) is a Pakistani independent socialist-feminist organization. It was founded in the federal capital Islamabad on March 8, 2018, by hundreds of delegates from Sindh, Balochistan, Punjab and Khyber-Pakhtunkhwa.

WDF aims to unite women across the country to build a socialist feminist movement to transform the International Women's Day celebration in Pakistan into real means of action. The manifesto and constitution of WDF strives to a broad-based struggle against capitalism, patriarchy, religious fascism, national oppression and Pakistan's authoritarian political system.

The Front was inaugurated on International Women's Day, 2018, when a large number of students, working women, intellectuals and political activists gathered for Aurat Azadi March, 2018.

== Background ==
WDF is a women's organization based in Pakistan which aims to build an organic socialist-feminist mass resistance movement by bringing together struggles of working-class women (doing mental or physical labour) from rural and urban areas. WDF adopts democratic and peaceful means of resistance.

== Foundation ==
WDF was formally established as a resistance movement on International Women's Day International Working on March 8, 2018, in Islamabad at a foundation congress by delegates from provincial units which were functional since 2014. The congress laid the foundation of Aurat Azadi March (Women's Freedom March) in Pakistan.

== Ideology ==
WDF considers violence, discrimination and patriarchal oppression as part of overall oppression and exploitation of the masses in Pakistan on the basis of class, gender and nation – pillars of capitalism, imperialism, feudalism and religious extremism. WDf is committed to continue its struggle until the women's right to life, their emancipation from all forms of oppression, progress and peace; and to establish people's democracy in Pakistan. Their ideology is described by socialist-feminism and history of women's political struggles.

== Organizational structure ==
WDF is a federal organization with country-wide presence as four national units in Khyber Pakhtunkhwa, Sindh, Punjab/Islamabad; Balochistan and a federal unit. WDF also aims to make units in the disputed territories of Gilgit-Baltistan, Kashmir to organize women of these areas making them part of the movement.

WDF has following intertwined elected structures:

- Congress: a political structure for political and ideological decision making
- Council: an organizational structure consisting of a secretariat called the "Cabinet" for implementing decisions for day-to-day affairs

These structures exist at three levels of district, federal and provincial/national levels.

== Leadership ==
The Federal Cabinet of WDF comprises five members:

President: Ismat Shahjahan

General Secretary: Alya Bakhshal

Secretary Information and Publishing: Tooba Syed

Secretary Education and Art: Shahzadi Hussain

Secretary Finance: Lubna Kifayat

Jalila Haider, one of the provincial president of WDF, from Quetta, Balochistan was named in the 100 Women in 2019

Nargis Afsheen Khattak (Khyber Pakhtunkhwa chapter of WDF)
