= PK-99 Bannu-I =

Pakistani electoral district

- Constituency for the Khyber Pakhtunkhwa Assembly
- Region: Domel Tehsil, Gumatti Tehsil (partly) and Bannu Tehsil (partly) of Bannu District

Current constituency
- Created: 2002
- Seats: 1
- Party: Vacant
- Member: Zahid Ullah Khan
- Created from: PK-71 Bannu-II (2002-2018) PK-87 Bannu-I (2018-2023)

PK-99 Bannu-I (پی کے-99 بنوں-1) is a constituency for the Khyber Pakhtunkhwa Assembly of the Khyber Pakhtunkhwa province of Pakistan.

== See also ==
- PK-98 Karak-II
- PK-100 Bannu-II
