= PK-98 Karak-II =

Pakistani electoral district

- Constituency for the Khyber Pakhtunkhwa Assembly
- Region: Takht-e-Nasrati Tehsil and Karak Tehsil (partly) of Karak District

Current constituency
- Party: Muttahida Majlis-e-Amal
- Member(s): Zafar Azam
- Created from: PK-41 Karak-II (before 2018) PK-86 Karak-II (2018-2022)

PK-98 Karak-II (پی کے-98 کرک-2) is a constituency for the Khyber Pakhtunkhwa Assembly of the Khyber Pakhtunkhwa province of Pakistan.

== See also ==
- PK-97 Karak-I
- PK-99 Bannu-I
