= Nadir Ali Shah =

Muslim Saint (1897–1974)

Murshid Syed Nadir Ali Shah
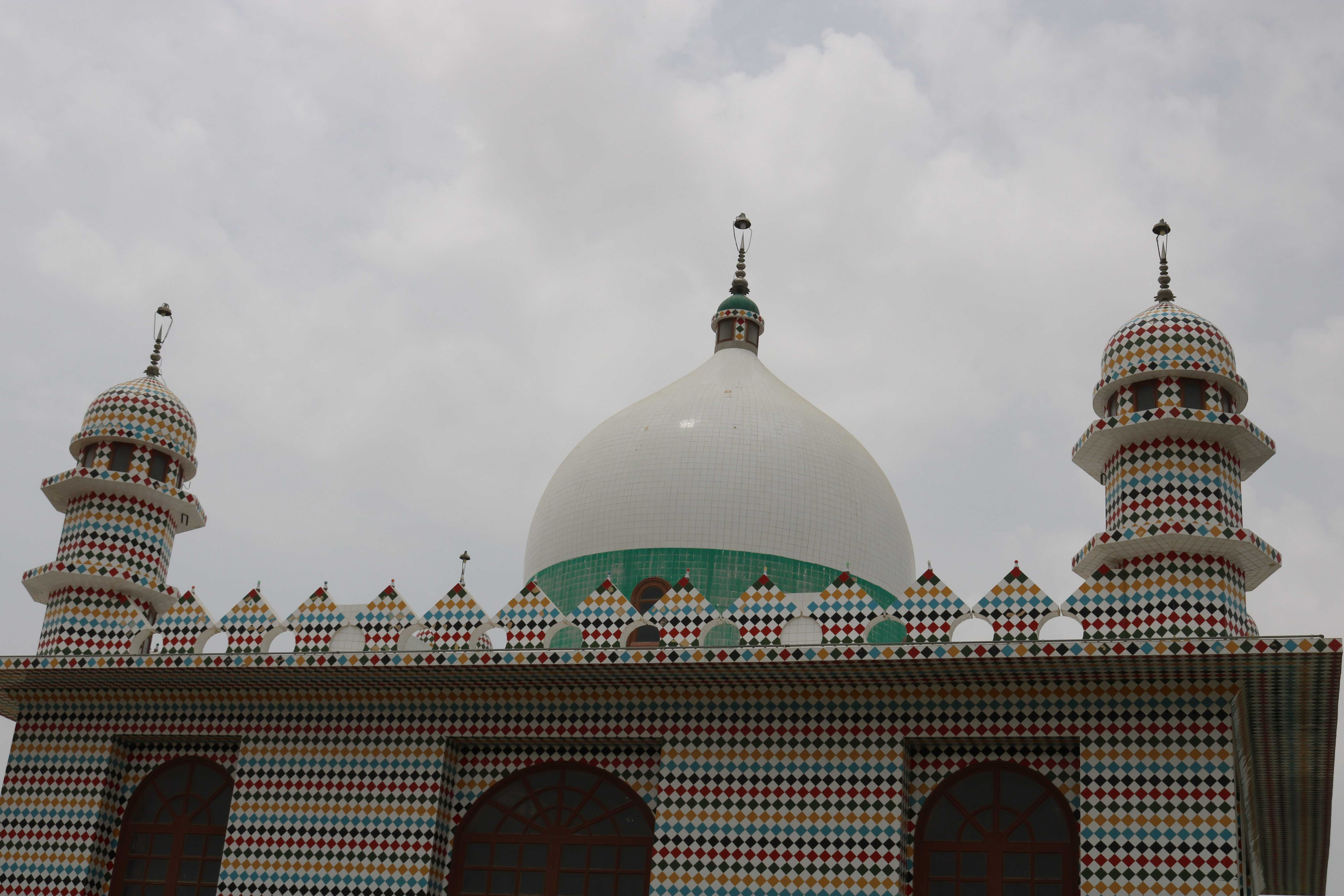
- Tomb of Syed Nadir Ali Shah in Sehwan
- Born: Murshid Nadir Ali Shah; 1897; Gandaf, District Swabi (modern day Pakistan)
- Residence: Sehwan Sharif, Sindh
- Died: 8 October 1974; Sehwan, Sindh, Pakistan
- Venerated in: Islam
- Years active: 1931–1974
- Known for: Sufism, asceticism, divine love, philanthropy, herbal medicine
- Predecessor: Murshid Deedar Ali Shah (1926–1931)
- Successor: Murshid Arif Ali Shah (1974–2022)
- Parent: Syed Ghulam Shah (father)

Syed Nadir Ali Shah (1897 – 8 October 1974) (Sindhi: سيد نادر علي شاهه; Urdu: سید نادر علی شاہ), popularly known as Murshid Nadir Ali Shah, was a Sufi saint of the Qalandariyya Sufi order of Islam, a Muslim preacher, ascetic, mystic, philanthropist and humanitarian. Born in Gandaf in the north-west of the Indian subcontinent, he eventually settled in Sehwan Sharif, Sindh. He was a spiritual descendant of the well-regarded Sufi saint Lal Shahbaz Qalandar and the custodian of the revered Sufi Khanqah, Kafi Sakhi Sarwar located in Sehwan Sharif. Nadir Ali Shah's legacy primarily revolves around his distinction as one of the most remarkable figures among the saints of the Qalandariyya Sufi order. He is renowned for his pursuits in Islamic preaching, mysticism, and asceticism. Beyond his spiritual contributions, he is recognized for his substantial efforts in advancing human welfare and uplifting the underprivileged, in line with the teachings of the Qalandariyya Sufi order of Islam. Notably, he also served as the custodian of the shrine of the Sufi saint Abdullah Shah Ghazi in Karachi.

== Biography ==
=== Early life ===
He was born in Gandaf, District Swabi in 1897 to a Pashtun Syed family. He received his early education from his father Syed Ghulam Shah. He was young when his father died.

=== Finding the Murshid ===
In his early youth, he obtained permission from his mother and embarked on a long journey of finding a Murshid (spiritual guide) for himself. He travelled for years and covered the entire Indian subcontinent, seeking knowledge from saints and scholars in Lahore, Sirhind Sharif, Delhi, Ajmer and Quetta before finally settling in Sehwan Sharif. During his stay in Quetta, he had recurring dreams of seeing Lal Shahbaz Qalandar, directing him to reach Sehwan Sharif as soon as possible.

Finally, in Sehwan Sharif, at the Sufi centre near the Shrine of Lal Shahbaz Qalandar, he met his long-awaited Murshid (spiritual mentor), who was destined to have the greatest influence on his life, Deedar Ali Shah. Murshid Deedar Ali Shah, the successor of the Qalandariyya Sufi order and custodian of the Sufi centre named Kafi Sakhi Sarwar, warmly greeted him, as he was already anticipating and eagerly awaiting his arrival that day. Nadir Ali Shah then formally pledged his allegiance to his spiritual teacher, who later appointed him as his successor. Thus, after Deedar Ali Shah's death in 1931, Nadir Ali Shah became the custodian, and was succeeded with the title of Murshid Nadir Ali Shah.

=== Spiritual discipline ===
Nadir Ali Shah adopted an ascetic lifestyle, dedicating much of his life to meditation, prayer, and the remembrance of God. He reportedly gave up solid food early in life and subsisted on a liquid diet. For a period of two years, he lived in a cave near Sehwan Sharif, engaged in spiritual practices and devotion. He dressed in the traditional attire of faqirs, including a Qalandari cap—a cotton cap with flaps covering the ears. Known for his spiritual discipline, he was referred to as "an advanced pilgrim" due to his intense devotional journey. Nadir Ali Shah is said to have fasted continuously for fifty years, spending his days in fasting and his nights in prayer. He would often spend long hours in supplication (dua), sitting with his hands raised in prayer.

=== As a Sufi master ===
Nadir Ali Shah held the distinguished position of being the most prominent disciple of Murshid Deedar Ali Shah within the Qalandariyya Sufi order of Islam, a lineage attributed to Lal Shahbaz Qalandar. This Sufi order was connected to the custodianship of the Sufi khanqah known as Kafi Sakhi Sarwar in Sehwan Sharif. Before his death in 1931, Deedar Ali Shah appointed Nadir Ali Shah as the murshid (spiritual leader) of this Sufi order. His tenure spanned 43 years until his death in 1974. His life was characterized by a profound dedication to serving humanity, through ethical, spiritual, and pragmatic means. As a murshid, Nadir Ali Shah played a pivotal role in inspiring a multitude of individuals to transform their lives. His teachings and actions motivated many to attain spiritual prominence and contribute to society through acts of compassion and service, including the provision of food to the hungry. Like his predecessors, he was reverently referred to as the "Ruler of The Brotherhood." Following his death, Murshid Arif Ali Shah succeeded him in 1974. The legacy of Nadir Ali Shah and his disciples continues to be recognized and respected. Notably, British author and Literature Nobel Laureate V. S. Naipaul visited Nadir Ali Shah's Sufi center in Sehwan Sharif during a trip to Pakistan in 1979. Naipaul recognised the community of his disciples as a group of friendly, delighted people with brightness in their eyes, who "knew they served the poor and God". They had chosen a "life of sacrifice and service". The disciples who followed Nadir Ali Shah's teachings attained remarkable spiritual heights, reflecting the enduring impact of his teachings and practices.

Nadir Ali Shah also held the role of custodian for the shrine of the two grandsons of Abdul Qadir Gilani. This shrine, dedicated to Mahmood ibn Abdul Razzaq Gilani and Ahmed ibn Abdul Razzaq Gilani, is situated to the west of Sehwan city and is alternatively known as Pir Pota Mazar or Dargah Masoom Pak. An annual congregation, known as urs, is held in their honor on the 10th of Rabi' al-Thani, drawing a significant number of attendees.

Furthermore, Nadir Ali Shah served as the custodian of the shrine of the 8th-century Sufi saint Abdullah Shah Ghazi, located in Karachi. During his tenure, he contributed to the construction, expansion and beautification of the shrine. He constructed the iconic green and white striped dome of the shrine, which became a recognizable emblem of the city. He oversaw the addition of various facilities on the shrine premises, including a mosque, a langar khana (free kitchens), a qawwali hall, and a guest house. A striking feature of his contributions was the establishment of a long stairway leading to the shrine, which adorned the top of a sandy hill. A meaningful connection has been observed between the shrine of Abdullah Shah Ghazi in Karachi and Syed Nadir Ali Shah's Sufi order in Sehwan Sharif. This bond underscores the enduring spiritual impact of Nadir Ali Shah's custodianship across different shrines and locations.

== The Kafi (Dervish Lodge) ==
Location

Situated just a brief stroll away from Qalandar's shrine in Sehwan Sharif, the Kafi stands as an ancient spiritual institution and dwelling place for the dervishes of the Qalandariyya Sufi order of Islam.

Etymology

The Kafi is a revered Khanqah that holds a special place for the Qalandariyya Sufi Order. It's known as the Kafi of Murshid Nadir Ali Shah, expanded under his guidance with heightened spirituality and humanitarian efforts, including the establishment of langar. Nearby is the revered site of Sultan Sakhi Sarwar's worship, giving rise to the name Kafi Sakhi Sarwar.

The Kafi holds historical significance, dating back to the era of Lal Shahbaz Qalandar. The custodian of Kafi, referred to as the murshid or spiritual guide, leads the disciples known as malangs (dervishes) and sawalis (aspirants). The malangs are devoted and well-organized in their cause, numbering over two hundred and fifty as of the 1980s. Some of them serve at the shrine of Abdullah Shah Ghazi and other shrines. Notably, these malangs include highly educated and prosperous individuals who have embraced a "life of sacrifice and service". The Sufi order has garnered hundreds of thousands of followers worldwide.

The murshid, as the spiritual leader, traces their spiritual lineage and descent from the revered Lal Shahbaz Qalandar. The premises hold the shrines of the ten previous murshids, who are held in high regard for their exceptional contributions and service, having been revered as "rulers or governors of the brotherhood". Murshid Nadir Ali Shah, died in 1974 at the age of seventy-seven. He was succeeded by his most distinguished disciple, Murshid Arif Ali Shah, who, in addition to being a spiritual leader, was a certified MBBS doctor. Murshid Arif Ali Shah held the throne and crown until his death in 2022 at the age of seventy-nine.

Teachings

The Qalandari Tariqa, or Sufi order, places a strong emphasis on the struggle with oneself, the purification of the heart, and the nourishment of the soul. These spiritual goals are achieved through prayers and remembrance, coupled with the concept of khidmat, which signifies dedicated service to humanity.

Services

The Kafi serves as a spiritual institution where the education and training of Qalandar's devotees have been carried out for more than seven hundred years. Throughout the centuries, the Kafi had the esteemed privilege of caretaking of the sacred shrine of Lal Shahbaz Qalandar, ensuring its proper maintenance. Additionally, the Kafi has been a source of free food and water for pilgrims and visitors to Sehwan Sharif.

Upon the passing of Murshid Deedar Ali Shah in 1931, his spiritual successor, Murshid Nadir Ali Shah, took on the mantle of overseeing the Kafi and its sacred responsibilities. Murshid Nadir Ali Shah proved to be a wise, compassionate, and generous leader, known for his profound hospitality and simplicity. He devoted his life to alleviating hunger and initiated the "free food and water program," which was expanded to cater not only to the underprivileged residents of the town and its surroundings but also to those in Karachi and other cities.

Amidst their daily routine of prayers and remembrance of God, the devoted malangs of the Kafi tirelessly managed the distribution of food and water to the impoverished residents of the town and its suburbs. Despite the scorching heat of Sehwan, kneading large amounts of flour to provide bread for the needy was no small feat, but the dedication of the Qalandar's followers allowed this service to continue year-round. Water, an essential commodity, was sourced from the Indus River, and the process involved considerable effort and hardship. Nadir Ali Shah also built a pilgrim hostel for the travellers. He was honoured and held in high esteem by the people.

Even when faced with rising wheat prices, Murshid Nadir Ali Shah remained resolute in his commitment to the langar service, expressing unwavering faith in Divine providence. He firmly believed that this charitable endeavor would endure, regardless of the cost of wheat, as it was a sacred offering for the sake of Allah.

Following him, under the guidance of Murshid Arif Ali Shah, the Kafi continued to expand its services. It provided daily meals to thousands, and in response to the demands of the modern era, the dervish lodge adapted by delivering free rations during the COVID-19 lockdown.

== Teachings and impact ==
Nadir Ali Shah, a prominent Murshid of the Qalandariyya Sufi order of Islam, was known for his profound teachings that touched upon various aspects of spirituality, human conduct, and service to humanity. His impact on his followers and the broader community was significant, as his teachings resonated with people across the world.

1. Devotion to God: At the core of Nadir Ali Shah's teachings was a strong emphasis on devotion to God. He encouraged his disciples and followers to develop a deep and personal connection with the Divine through prayers, remembrance, and spiritual contemplation. This devotion was seen as a path to inner peace and enlightenment.
2. Pursuit of Knowledge: Nadir Ali Shah believed that knowledge was a key to spiritual growth. He urged his disciples to seek knowledge relentlessly, emphasizing that understanding the world and its mysteries could lead to a deeper understanding of God. This pursuit of knowledge extended beyond religious texts and encompassed various fields of study.
3. Tawakkul (Reliance on God): Tawakkul is the concept of placing complete trust and reliance on God's will. Nadir Ali Shah taught his followers to surrender to God's wisdom and guidance in all aspects of life. This trust in God's plan was considered a source of strength and resilience in the face of life's challenges.
4. Sabr (Patience): Patience, both in times of difficulty and prosperity, was a virtue Nadir Ali Shah emphasized. He believed that patience was a way to purify the soul and demonstrate trust in God's timing. It was a quality that enabled individuals to endure trials with grace and dignity.
5. Purity and Humility: Nadir Ali Shah stressed the importance of maintaining purity, not only in a physical sense but also in one's thoughts and intentions. Humility, he taught, was the path to true greatness. By humbling oneself before God and fellow human beings, individuals could transcend their ego and connect with the Divine.
6. Brotherhood and Forgiveness: Nadir Ali Shah promoted the idea of brotherhood among his disciples and followers. He encouraged them to support and care for each other like a family. Forgiveness was another cornerstone of his teachings. He believed that forgiving others was a means of purifying the heart and soul.
7. Khidmat (Service to Humanity): Nadir Ali Shah's teachings emphasized selfless service to humanity. He believed that helping those in need, regardless of their background or circumstances, was a sacred duty. His establishment of the "free food and water program" exemplified his commitment to serving the underprivileged.

Nadir Ali Shah's teachings left a profound impact on a significant number of individuals worldwide. His emphasis on spirituality, devotion, knowledge, and service resonated with many, drawing them towards a path of spiritual growth and humanitarianism. His legacy lives on through those who continue to follow and practice his teachings, reflecting the enduring influence of his spiritual guidance within the Qalandariyya Sufi order of Islam.

=== Philanthropy ===
Murshid Nadir Ali Shah significantly expanded the philanthropic efforts of his dervish lodge, envisioning a comprehensive framework to provide free access to essential resources such as quality food, healthcare, education, shelter, safe water, and sanitation for all marginalized sectors of society. He placed a strong emphasis on addressing the issue of hunger, recognizing its potential to positively impact people's lives. He firmly believed that ensuring two nutritious meals a day could pave the way for children and young adults to attain an education, fostering optimism for a more promising future. Additionally, he recognized that food security could empower laborers and families with modest incomes to allocate resources towards health and other necessities, thereby enhancing their spiritual, social, and emotional well-being.

During the 1930s, Murshid Nadir Ali Shah laid the groundwork for a volunteer organization with the primary goal of alleviating hunger and malnutrition. This initiative was inspired by his commitment to making a positive impact on society. As part of this effort, he initiated a langar khana, or free meal service program, in Sehwan Sharif. This program had a twofold objective: not only to address immediate malnutrition and hunger concerns but also to tackle broader issues of age, gender, and socioeconomic disparities in accessing nourishment. Today, the langar khana continues to provide free meals to thousands of individuals daily, catering to men, women, and children alike.

Moreover, he extended the scope of the free meal service program to encompass the shrine of Abdullah Shah Ghazi in Karachi.

=== Herbal medicine ===
Nadir Ali Shah possessed expertise in herbal medicine and served as a skilled physician. Individuals from distant and nearby locations would travel to seek treatment from him.

== Spiritual lineage ==
Like other major Sufi orders, the Qalandariyya emphasizes an unbroken spiritual lineage, or silsila, tracing its knowledge back to the Islamic Prophet Muhammad through his companion Ali (d. 661).

The spiritual lineage of the Kafi Sakhi Sarwar within the Qalandariyya order, along with the years they served, includes:

- Murshid Roshan Ali Shah (1813–1826)
- Murshid Darbar Ali Shah (1826–1841)
- Murshid Aman Ali Shah (1841–1853)
- Murshid Khaki Shah (1853–1869)
- Murshid Mehboob Ali Shah (1869–1900)
- Murshid Qutub Ali Shah (1900–1914)
- Murshid Shamsher Ali Shah (1914–1926)
- Murshid Deedar Ali Shah (1926–1931)
- Murshid Nadir Ali Shah (1931–1974)
- Murshid Arif Ali Shah (1974–2022)

This lineage reflects the continuous transmission of spiritual wisdom, where the conclusion of one Murshid's term ushers in the start of the next, creating an unbroken line of succession This unbroken chain is rooted in Prophet Muhammad, extending through Ali and Lal Shahbaz Qalandar.

== Death and burial ==
Nadir Ali Shah died in the early hours of Tuesday, October 8, 1974 (21st Ramadan 1394 AH) at the age of 77. His funeral prayer took place within the precincts of the Shrine of Lal Shahbaz Qalandar and saw the attendance of a significant gathering. Qazi Muhammad Murad led the funeral prayer. He was laid to rest beside his spiritual guide, Murshid Deedar Ali Shah, in Sehwan Sharif.

== Legacy ==
Nadir Ali Shah's successor after his death in 1974 was his nephew, Murshid Arif Ali Shah, who continued his legacy until his passing in 2022 at the age of seventy-nine. These spiritual leaders left behind a profound impact, with hundreds of thousands of devoted followers in Pakistan and around the world, known for their unwavering commitment to God and service to humanity. Murshid Arif Ali Shah was succeeded by his sons, Murshid Shafaat Ali Shah and Murshid Saadat Ali Shah.

Notably, the Langar khana (free food facility) of Nadir Ali Shah remains a focal point of his legacy. Situated within the dervish lodge also known as Kafi in Sehwan Sharif, this charitable center continues to provide three meals a day to thousands of individuals each day. This endeavor virtually sustains the entire impoverished population of the town, as well as travelers passing through. The facility is manned by dozens of devoted malangs (dervishes), who tirelessly prepare and distribute the food.

In addition, his followers have established numerous free drinking water Sebils throughout Sehwan Sharif, offering cold water to countless individuals each day. Moreover, the center offers accommodations for travelers in its designated travelers' lodge. A free health center is also established, providing medical treatment to individuals from both local and distant areas.

== In Poetry and Prose ==
Prominent poets of Pakistan spanning various eras have showcased their reverence and affection for Murshid Nadir Ali Shah through a myriad of qasidas (panegyrics) and manqabats (devotional poems) composed in languages like Urdu, Sindhi, Punjabi, Balochi, and Pashto. Eminent artists including Noor Jehan, Shaukat Ali, Ahmed Khan, and Khyal Muhammad have commemorated and paid homage to him through their Qawwalis.

EMI Pakistan marked his legacy by releasing an album of devotional songs titled "Qawwali Hazrat Syed Nadir Ali Shah" on the occasion of his 40th death anniversary.

== Shrine ==
The Dargah (shrine) of Nadir Ali Shah is situated within the premises of his dervish lodge, located southeast of the Shrine of Lal Shahbaz Qalandar. The iconic white dome is highlighted by a green ceramic tile border. The dome, hemispherical in shape, crowns a square edifice adorned with four minarets, all embellished with mosaic ceramic tilework. A harmonious array of mosaic tilework on the exterior walls forms horizontal lines of yellow, green, red, black, and blue tiles against a white background, extending from bottom to top. This arrangement evokes a sense of pure delight. Inside the shrine, intricate glasswork graces the lofty ceiling and dome. Turquoise ceramic tiles and delicate glasswork adorn the interior walls, while Quranic verses are elegantly carved into the glasswork on the northern wall. A significant number of people visit the shrine daily to pay tribute to Nadir Ali Shah.

== See also ==
- Islam in South Asia
- List of Sufi saints in India
