= Zahid Ullah Khan =

Pakistani politician

Member of the Provincial Assembly of Khyber Pakhtunkhwa
- Incumbent
- Assumed office 29 February 2024
- Constituency: PK-99 Bannu-I

Personal details
- Born: Bannu District, Khyber Pakhtunkhwa, Pakistan
- Political party: PTI (2024-present)

Zahid Ullah Khan is a Pakistani politician from Bannu District. He is currently serving as a member of the Provincial Assembly of Khyber Pakhtunkhwa since February 2024.

== Career ==
He contested the 2024 general elections as a Pakistan Tehreek-e-Insaf/Independent candidate from PK-99 Bannu-I. He secured 27,792 votes. The runner-up was Sher Azam Khan of JUI-F who secured 27,253 votes.
