= Bodla Bahar =

Disciple of Sufi saint Lal Shahbaz Qalandar

Makhdoom Sikandar Bodla Bahar Naqvi
- Title: Bodla Bahar (r.a)

Personal life
- Born: 1238 Uch
- Died: 1298 (aged 59–60) Sehwan
- Resting place: Sehwan Sharif, Sindh
- Parent: Kabir ul deen

Religious life
- Religion: Shia Islam

Senior posting
- Teacher: Laal Shahbaz Qalandar
- Based in: Sehwan
- Period in office: 13th century
- Predecessor: Lal Shahbaz Qalandar
- Successor: Syed Akhtar Hussain Naqvi And Syed Sameer Haider Naqvi

Bodla Bahar (Urdu: بودلہ بہار, Sindhi: بودلو بهار) was a devoted follower of Sufi saint Lal Shahbaz Qalandar. His mausoleum is in Sehwan Sharif, Sindh, Pakistan.

Originally named Bodla Sikandar, Bodla Bahar was a resident of Sehwan Sharif before the arrival of Lal Shahbaz Qalandar. He became one of the saint's most reliable and trustworthy disciples. Numerous legends surround Bodla Bahar and his connection to Lal Shahbaz.

One such tale recounts that Bodla Bahar, asked by the saint to get meat from the market, had neither money nor any other thing of value to offer for meat. Therefore, he instructed the butcher Anud to slaughter his body, sell the pieces in the bazaar, and use the revenue to buy a good lamb for the saint. Upon discovering this, Qalandar called out Bodla's name three times, miraculously causing the pieces of Bodla's flesh to reassemble and return to life.

== See also ==
- Sehwan Fort
