= Muttahida Labour Federation =

National trade union centre in Pakistan

MLF
- Muttahida Labour Federation
- Predecessor: UWF, JLF, BF
- Founded: 1988
- Location: Pakistan

The Muttahida Labour Federation (MLF) is a national trade union centre in Pakistan, regarded as the country's second most important after the Pakistan Workers' Federation. The centre is primarily based in Sindh and the North-West Frontier Province.

== History ==
MLF was established through a merger of the United Workers Federation, the Joint Labour Federation and the Balochistan Federation in 1988.

In 2002, MLF condemned a government ban on trade union activity in certain sectors, including welfare funds.

In 2010, MLF together with the Pakistan Workers' Federation filed a complaint against the government of Pakistan at the ILO. They complained that the government had allowed the Industrial Relations Act to expire without new labour legislation and had transferred the responsibility for labour issues from national to provincial governments, prohibiting unions from effectively engaging in collective bargaining for national companies, with the 18th amendment to the constitution of Pakistan. In November of that year, MLF and other trade unions protested against the 18th amendment in Lahore.

During the COVID-19 pandemic, MLF expressed its disappointment over the lack of data collected by the government on the effect of the pandemic on workers. The federation suggested that the government should work with unions to organise aid distribution to affected workers.
