= Takht-e-Nasrati =

Takht-e-Nasrati is a town of Karak District in Khyber Pakhtunkhwa. The town is the headquarters of Takht-e-Nasrati Tehsil - an administrative subdivision of the district, as well as a Union Council of the tehsil.

== Educational Institutes ==
- Govt Degree College Takht-e-Nasrati Karak
- Govt Girls Degree College Takht-e-Nasrati Karak
