= Aurat Azadi March =

The Aurat Azadi March (Urdu: عورت آزادی مارچ, lit. 'Women's Emancipation March') was started in 2018 in Pakistan by members of Women Democratic Front (socialist-feminist organization), other organizations like Women's Action Forum (Women's rights organization), Elimination of Violence against Women and Girls alliance, Young Teachers Association, Home-Based Women Workers Union, Awami Workers Party, Awami Jamhoori Party also joined the march on International Women's Day (March 8, 2018) in Islamabad. Aurat Azadi March and Aurat March are organized by different groups of women since 2018. Aurat Azadi March is organized by group of socialist feminists whereas Aurat March is organized by group of liberal feminists. Aurat March was also started the same year by the group of individual women known as "Hum Aurtein" collective in Karachi and Lahore.

Aurat Azadi March is held in different cities of Pakistan to fight against oppressive forms of social, economic and political structures (imperialism, patriarchy, capitalism and colonialism) against women whereas Aurat March is held with a purpose to fight the harassment and violence, minority rights and for economic, environmental and reproductive justice. According to Aasim Sajjad Akhtar, the ongoing struggle for women and oppressed genders amounts to significant progressive movement in Pakistan history.

== Context ==
Feminism in Pakistan

'...why we need
an alternative ideology,
which believes in
the principle of
equality and justice.
...which can guarantee
political, social, economic,
and individual rights
...of all genders.
That ideology
is called feminism.
~ Rabab Zehra.

— Dawn (Pakistan).
"The Aurat Azadi March
explains why we need
feminism'".
Islamabad,
February 23, 2021

According to Rabab Zehra, women in Pakistan are practically treated less than men, like second class citizens, despite women constitute fifty two percent Pakistan population, and in spite of constitutional guarantees. Zehra maintains most Pakistan women encounter psychological pressures, forced marriages, sexual harassment, domestic violence, lack of access to public spaces and public transport in dignified manner; Pakistani women need to struggle for their right to own education, health and safety. According to Aasim Sajjad Akhtar association of word 'Azaad' (Freedom) with Aurat march asserts notion of 'Aurat azad, samaj azad' i.e. freedom of woman is freedom of society from violent male-dominated society by dissolving oppression and the category of oppressor. Akhtar says patriarchal values imbibed since childhood makes Pakistani men one dimensional and miserable which they need to get rid of by relinquishing accrued structural benefits and power over women, with help of women. Akhtar says in Pakistan, women and trans people do face to all type of discrimination, abuse and violence in everyday life; what is reported in the news media is just the tip of the iceberg, and patriarchal norms are internalized in Pakistan's male dominated society, that includes some conservative women too, asking for freedom from oppression is considered almost kind of a sacrilege and charges of impropriety are hurled at supporters of Aurat Azaadi March those who strive for freedom from oppression nevertheless bears a heavy cost. Farkhanda Shahid Khan criticises patriarchal social fabric of the country and asserts that we march for Azadi, demanding freedom from patriarchy, violence, and oppression. Equal rights, justice, empowerment, and autonomy are our birthrights. Furthermore, Khan invites all genders to join Azadi Jalsa and Aurat March in reclaiming women’s futures and shaping a Pakistan where women are free, equal, and empowered.

== Aurat Azadi March 2018 ==
In 2018, Aurat Azadi March was held on March 8 when Women Democratic Front (WDF), was founded at the National Press Club, Islamabad. After the foundation congress, the participants held the March from the press club to Nazimudin Road raising slogans against war, violence, exploitation of working-class women and anti-women tribal and feudal traditions.

== Aurat Azadi March 2019 ==
On March 8, 2019, Aurat Azadi March was organised in Islamabad by Women Democratic Front, Ending Violence Against Women and Girls (EVAWG) alliance, Progressive Students Federation, teachers, political workers, Pakistan Trade Union Defence Campaign, advocates, Women Action Forum, filmmakers, transgender community, musicians, Sindhi Aurat Tanzeem, domestic and health workers.

== Aurat Azadi March 2020 ==
=== Aurat Azadi March 2020 Islamabad ===
Third Aurat Azadi March was held on International Women's Day on March 8, 2020 on the call of the Women Democratic Front in front of National Press club Islamabad. In this march, the organizers faced many hurdles before and during the march from anti-march elements. A petition was filed in the Islamabad High Court to stop Aurat Azadi March 2020 which was rejected by Chief justice Athar Minallah. On March 3, extremist mob vandalised, mural of two women painted by organizers of Aurat Azadi March Islamabad. The organizers of march were given the no-objection certificate (NOC) after many days of negotiations and a range of unnecessarily strict conditions were applied in NOC.

On March 8, 2020, the Aurat March procession in Pakistan's capital Islamabad led to a standoff with religious groups who were holding a counter-march to celebrate Haya. It was attended by women from the Jamaat-e-Islami, JUI-F, Lal Masjid, and female students of different seminaries including Jamia Hafsa led by Umme Hassan, staged as Haya March.

Earlier even before the March, a van carrying newly printed banners of Aurat March was stopped and driver beaten. During the March The BBC correspondent Irfana Yasser and her children were assaulted with chilli powder which temporarily blinded them. At least one media camera person hospitalized. Subsequently, the attack was stopped by the police authorities that were present, and the March continued forward despite the opposition. An FIR was registered against the men who attacked the march participants.

Aurat Azadi March 2020 also released and sung an anthem song "Hum Inquilab Hain" (We are Revolution).

=== Aurat Azadi March in Sindh ===
Aurat Azadi March 2020 was also organized in Sukkur, Hyderabad, Larkana and Mithi. In Sukkur, Jamiat Ulema-i-Islam-Fazl (JUI-F) urged the local administration and the government to stop the women's march, calling it "vulgarity" and against the law, Constitution, culture and Islam.

== Aurat Azadi March 2021 ==
In Islamabad, on March 8, 2021, Aurat Azadi March was started at the National Press Club and participants marched towards D-Chowk. Aurat Azadi March Islamabad manifesto asks for economic justice for women, reallocation of non combative defence budget to be diverted to social programmes with a theme devoted to "feminist care in the times of the COVID 19 crisis".

Aurat March in Hyderabad, Sindh in their 2021 demands pleaded for ending of tradition of undeclared curfew on women to access public places and also demanded more hostels for women, minimum wages act for domestic workers.

=== False allegations and anti-march campaign ===
Since, November 2020, a coordinated hashtag campaign was launched against Aurat March on social media alleging the march as 'foreign funded'. Also, the flag of left-wing socialist feminist organization, Women Democratic Front was alleged to be French flag, by rightwing ideologue Orya Maqbool Jan on television. WDF explained in detail the difference of the two flags i.e. WDF flag contains purple, white and red stripes whereas French flag contains blue, white and red stripes.

The anti-march elements released a doctored video of Aurat March sloganeering to malign the event which made march organizers's life too difficult with false blasphemy accusations. Many journalists and political commentators fuelled the disinformation campaign. Human Rights Commission of Pakistan, Federal minister Fawad Chaudhry and Pakistan Peoples Party's leader Bakhtawar Bhutto have condemned the doctored content. Aurat Azadi March organizers condemned the false allegations of blasphemy in strong words. Different groups staged protests against Aurat Azadi March in Islamabad. The banned outfit, Tehreek-e-Taliban Pakistan (TTP), threatened organisers of March and held demonstrations in many cities demanding the government to prosecute the march organisers. The March organisers were receiving death threats. Pakistan Peoples Party's secretary general Farhatullah Babar asked the government to protect the march organizers from violent threats and false allegations. Federal minister for religious affairs and inter-faith harmony said that inquiry would be conducted regarding the social media content. The March organisers issued statements to debunk the false allegations made in the smear campaign. They shared the original version of the video clip that was doctored, and explained the banner about the child sexual abuse victim. They demanded apology from all the journalists and social media accounts who spread misinformation and incited hatred against feminist movement. A local court in Peshawar ordered registering a First Information Report (FIR) against the organisers of Aurat Azadi March, Islamabad. The order was issued when a petition filed by a group of Peshawar-based lawyers was heard based on the same disinformation being circulated on social media. A local court in Karachi also directed the police to register FIR against March organizers from Islamabad. The strange thing to be observed was that initially the blasphemy accusations were raised online against placards and slogans from Lahore and Karachi marches but the sessions courts of Peshawar and Karachi ordered to file charges against the organisers of Islamabad's March. In April, 2021, sessions courts of Lahore and Islamabad dismissed the petitions seeking to register case against organizers and participants of Women's March.

== Aurat Azadi Jalsa ==
Aurat Azadi Jalsa is continuation of Aurat Azadi March and it has been celebrated since 2022.

=== 2022 ===
Aurat Azadi Jalsa was held on March 6, 2022 in Fatima Jinnah Park.

=== 2023 ===
Aurat Azadi Jalsa was organized in Fatima Jinnah Park, F-9, Islamabad on 5th March 2023. Major demands included restoration of economy, justice for flood affected women and peace.

== See also ==
- All Pakistan Women's Association
- Aurat Foundation
- Blue Veins
- Feminism in Pakistan
- Girls at Dhabas
- Me Too movement (Pakistan)
- Mera Jism Meri Marzi
- Musawah
- Pakistan Federation of Business And Professional Women
- Rape in Pakistan
- Violence against women in Pakistan
- Women in Islam
- Women in Pakistan
- Women's Action Forum
- Women's Protection Bill
- Women's rights
- Women related laws in Pakistan
