= Sehwan =

Place in Sindh, Pakistan

Sehwan: سيوهڻ; سہون
- City
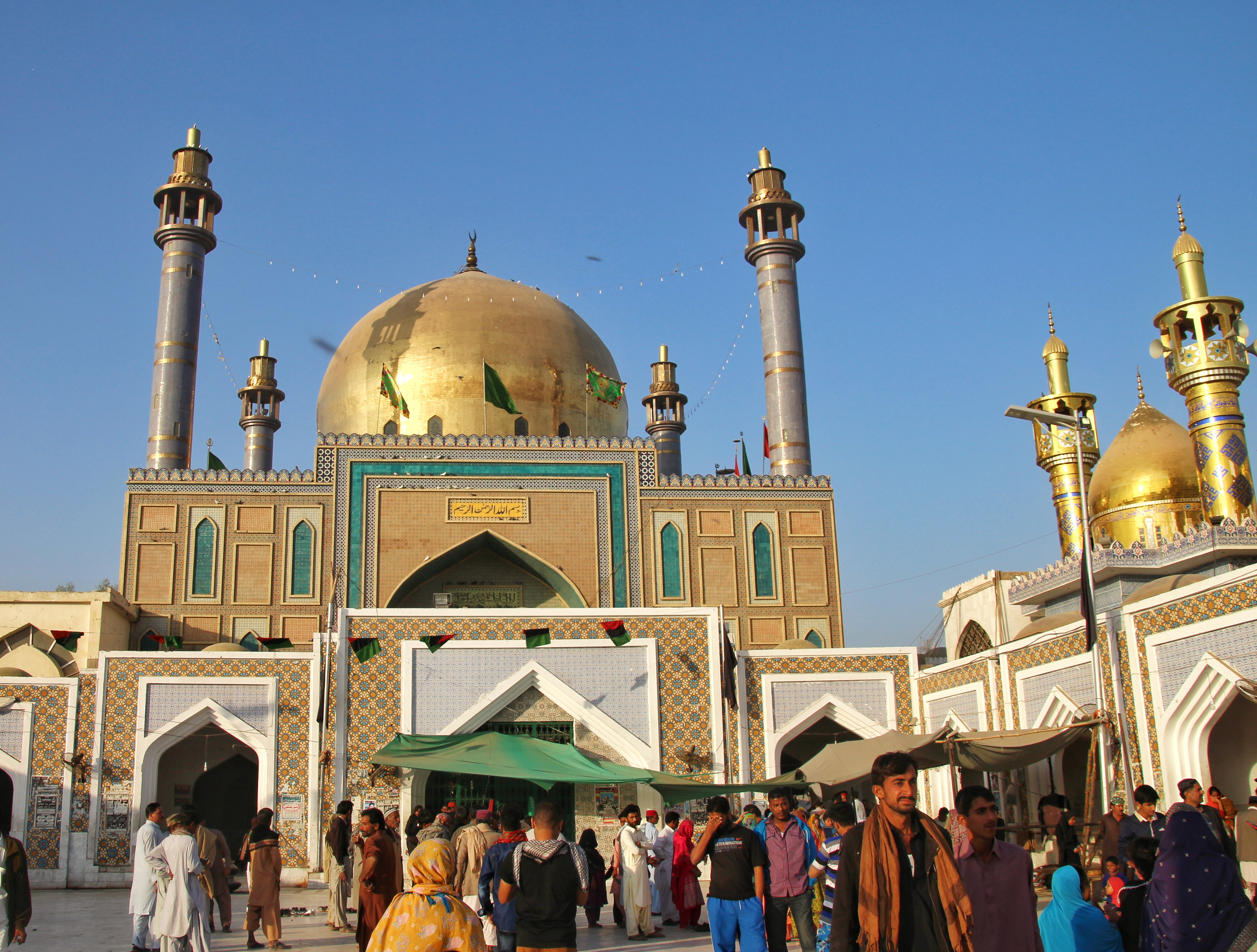
- The Shrine of Lal Shahbaz Qalandar in Sehwan Sharif

- Location within Sindh
- Coordinates: 26.4193143°N 67.8593731°E
- Country: Pakistan
- Province: Sindh
- District: Jamshoro

Population (2023 census)
  - Total: 75,167
- Time zone: UTC+5 (PST)
- Calling code: 76140

Sehwan (Sindhi: سيوهڻ شريف; Urdu: سہون شریف), also commonly referred to as Sehwan Sharif (meaning Noble Sehwan) is a historic city located in Jamshoro District of the Sindh province in Pakistan. It is situated on the west bank of the Indus River, approximately 130 kilometers (80 miles) northwest of Hyderabad, Sindh. The city is best known for being the site of one of Pakistan's most prominent Sufi shrines, the Shrine of Lal Shahbaz Qalandar. Sehwan holds the administrative status of a taluka within the Jamshoro District. Historically, it was part of the Dadu District until the creation of Jamshoro District, when it was incorporated into the new administrative unit.

Sehwan is recognized as one of Pakistan's most significant spiritual and pilgrimage centers. It holds a central place in the country's Sufi heritage, alongside other prominent shrines such as the Shrine of Abdullah Shah Ghazi in Karachi, the Data Durbar Complex in Lahore, Bari Imam in Noorpur Shahan near Islamabad, and the revered tombs of the Suhrawardi Sufis in Multan. These sites collectively reflect the deep-rooted Sufi traditions that have shaped the religious and cultural landscape of the region for centuries.

== History ==
Sehwan is considered one of the most ancient cities of Sindh, Pakistan. According to various historical traditions, the origins of Sehwan trace back to antiquity . It was originally known as " Sivisthan " named after ancient Sivi janapada, which eventually evolved into Sehwan after Turk invasion of Sindh.

Syed Muhibullah, in A Brief History of Sindh, records another tradition claiming that Sehwan was named after a great-grandson of Ham (son of Noah). Meanwhile, British author William Dalrymple suggests that the name derives from Shivistan, referencing the Hindu deity Shiva.

Historian Molai Sheedai, in his book Tarikh-e-Tamaddun-e-Sindh, attributes the city's foundation to the Sewi Aryans, thus calling it Sewistan. Another scholarly view identifies the city as ancient Sindomana, a name frequently mentioned in Greek historical sources. The Sanskrit term Sindhu-mán means "the possessor or ruler of Sindh," and its variant Sindhu-ván may have evolved phonetically into Sehwan over time.

Sindomana is believed to have been the capital of King Sambos, who was defeated by Alexander during his campaign in the region in 326 BC. A prominent archaeological mound known as Kafir Qila ("Fort of the Pagans") lies to the north of the city and is associated with this period.

Sehwan was conquered by Muhammad bin Qasim in 711 CE during his expedition into Sindh, seizing it from the son of Raja Dahir. Later, in 1026 CE, the city was again captured by Mahmud of Ghazni.

Throughout the medieval period, Sehwan played a significant role in the political dynamics of the region. It was successively ruled by the Sumra, Samma, Arghun, and Tarkhan dynasties. During the rule of the Thatta Kingdom, Sehwan served as its capital. An unsuccessful attempt to capture Sehwan was made by the Mughal emperor Humayun in 1542 during his march to Umarkot, but the city eventually fell to his son Akbar in 1590s.

Following the Mughals era, Sehwan came under the control of the Kalhora and later the Talpur dynasties, continuing its legacy as a historically and culturally significant city in Sindh

== Demographics ==
Census	Population
1972	8,357
1981	13,891
1998	34,923
2017	66,898
2023	75,167

Languages

First Languages of Sehwan city in (2023 Pakistani census)
1. Sindhi (99.6%)
2. Others (0.40%)

== Notable places ==
The city is best known for the resting place of the eminent 13th-century Sufi saint Lal Shahbaz Qalandar.

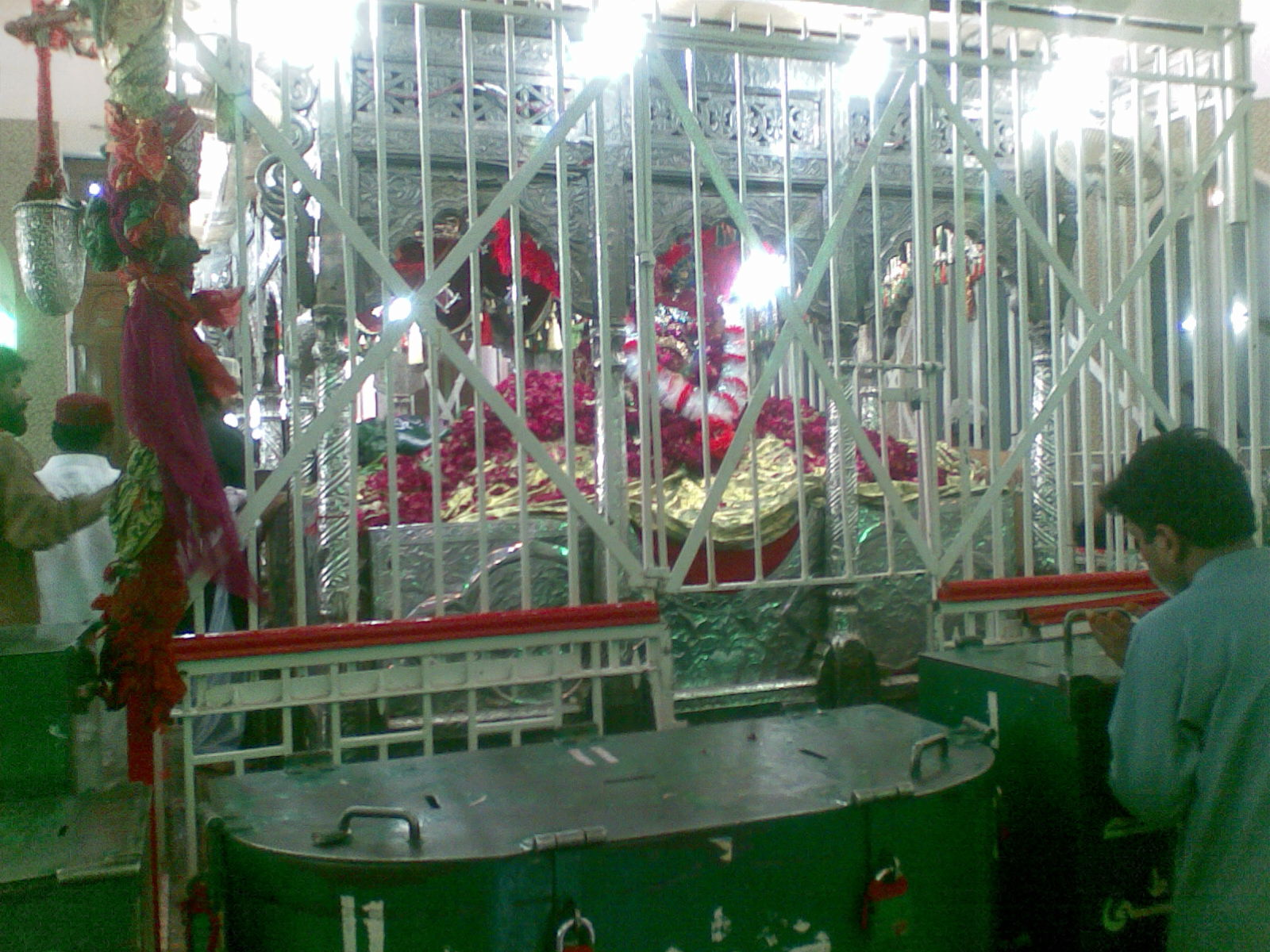
The tomb of Lal Shahbaz Qalandar at Sehwan Sharif, Sindh, Pakistan

The Shrine of Lal Shahbaz Qalandar attracts hundreds of thousands of pilgrims and visitors annually, particularly during the urs (death anniversary) celebrations. Another significant spiritual site in Sehwan is the Shrine of Murshid Nadir Ali Shah, a renowned spiritual successor in the Qalandariyya Sufi tradition. The shrine operates a large langar khana (community kitchen) that serves free meals to visitors around the clock, continuing a long-standing tradition of service and hospitality. Sehwan is also home to the legendary Inverted City, a site associated with local folklore and mystical beliefs. Additionally, Manchar Lake, the largest natural freshwater lake in Pakistan, lies a short distance from the city, contributing to its ecological and cultural landscape.

== Economy ==
The economy of Sehwan Sharif encompasses a diverse range of sources of income and economic activities that sustain the local populace. Notable among these income sources are:

1. Agriculture: Agriculture is a foundational pillar of the local economy. Farmers in the region cultivate a variety of crops, including wheat, rice, cotton, sugarcane, and vegetables.

2. Livestock Farming: The livestock sector, encompassing cattle, goats, and poultry, significantly contributes to the economy. It generates income through the sale of dairy products, meat, and poultry.

3. Pilgrimage and Religious Tourism: Sehwan Sharif is renowned for hosting the shrine of Lal Shahbaz Qalandar, a venerated Sufi saint. Pilgrims and tourists visit the shrine, and their donations, offerings, and patronage of local businesses collectively bolster the local economy.

4. Trade and Commerce: The town houses a bustling marketplace where a variety of goods are traded. Local businesses, including shops and markets, contribute to economic activity.

5. Handicrafts: Local artisans and craftsmen produce traditional Sindhi handicrafts, such as pottery, embroidered textiles, and jewelry, which find buyers locally and among tourists.

6. Transportation: Sehwan Sharif's strategic location as a transportation hub facilitates trade and transportation-related businesses.

7. Education and Services: Educational institutions, including schools and colleges, offer employment opportunities, while service-oriented enterprises cater to the needs of the community.

8. Government Employment: Government employment, comprising schools, healthcare facilities, and administrative offices, also serves as a significant source of livelihood for the local population.

The economy of Sehwan Sharif, like that of many regions, is marked by a fusion of traditional and contemporary sectors, evolving to meet the needs of its residents.

== Incident ==
On 16 February 2017, a suicide bomber triggered an explosion at the Shrine of Lal Shahbaz Qalandar, killing at least 83 people and injuring almost 250. The attack occurred during a praying session. The bombing took place at an 800 year old Shrine. Later the ISIS claimed responsibility for this terrorist attack stating that their 'martyr' had detonated a vest at the popular Shia gathering at the shrine.

== See also ==
- Lal Shahbaz Qalandar
- Bodla Bahar
- Nadir Ali Shah
- Sehwan Sharif Airport
