= Lal Shahbaz Qalandar =

Sufi saint and poet (1177–1274)

Sayyid Uthman al-Marwandi Lal Shahbaz Qalandar
- لعل شهباز قلندر
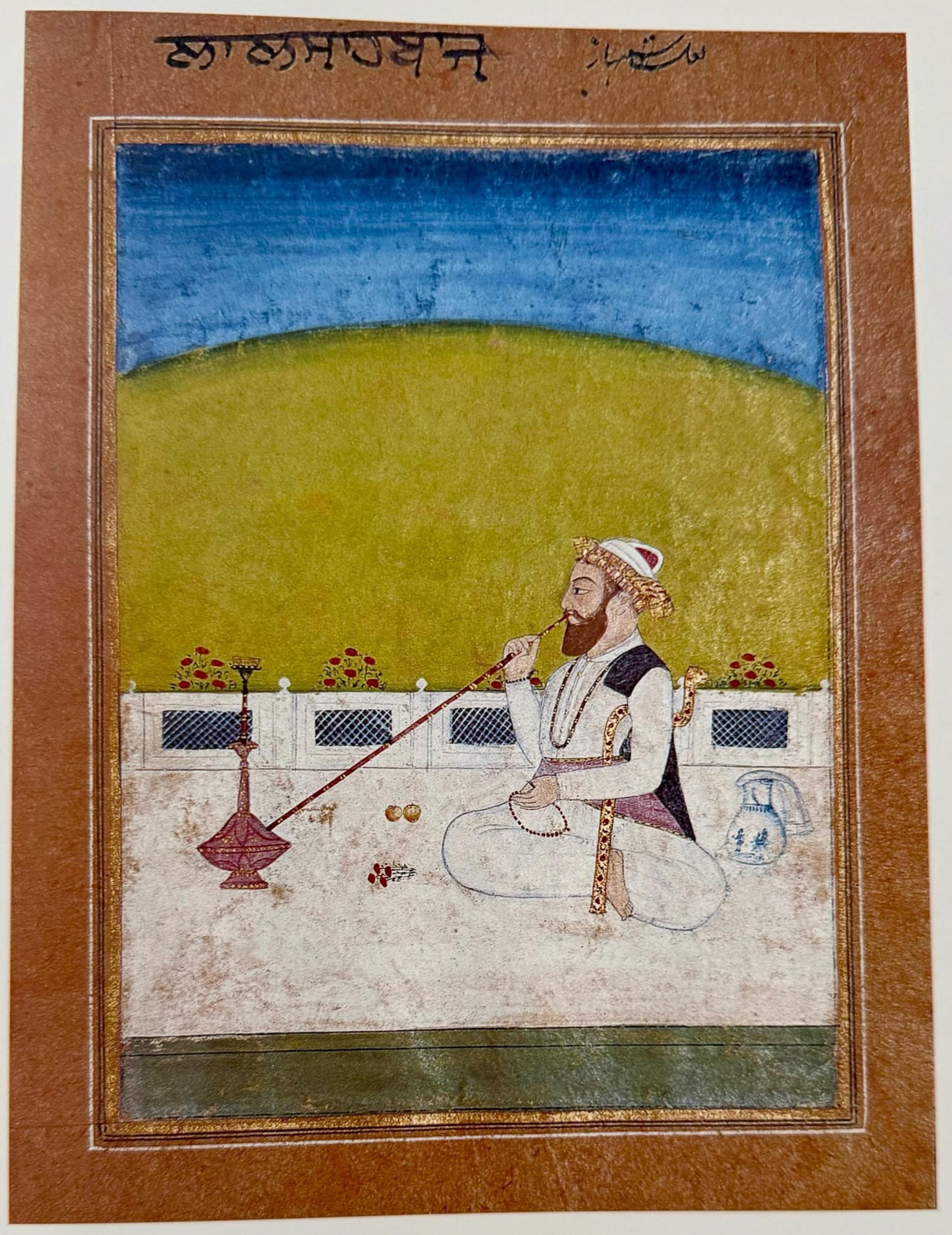
- Painting of Lal Shah Baj smoking huqqa on a terrace
- Title: Qalandar

Personal life
- Born: Sayyid Uthman al-Marwandi; 1177 CE Marwand, present-day Azerbaijan
- Died: 19 February 1274 (aged 96–97) Sehwan (present-day Sindh, Pakistan)
- Parent: Sayyid Ibrahim Kabiruddin al-Jawabi al-Jafari (father)

Religious life
- Religion: Islam
- Denomination: Sunni islam

Muslim leader
- Based in: Sehwan
- Period in office: 12th–13th century

Sayyid Uthman al-Marwandi (1177 – 19 February 1274), popularly known as Lal Shahbaz Qalandar (Sindhi: لعل شهباز قلندر), was a 13th-century Sufi saint and poet who is revered in South Asia, notably by the Sindhi people. Born in Marwand in present-day Azerbaijan, he eventually settled in Sindh.

== Names ==
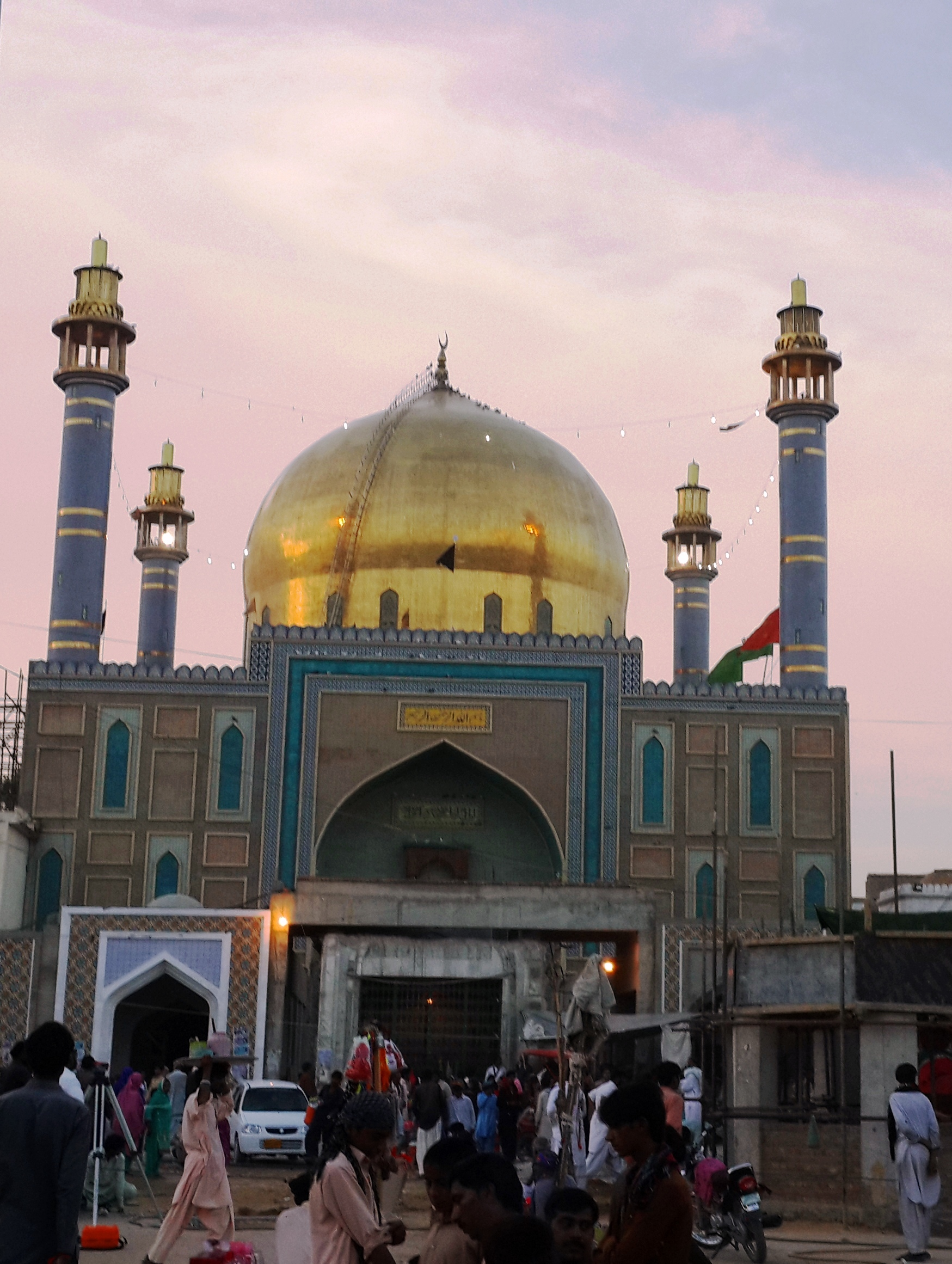
Mausoleum of Lal Shahbaz Qalandar, in Sindh, Pakistan.

He is called Lal ("ruby-coloured") because he used to wear red, his favorite color; Shahbaz to denote a noble and divine spirit; and Qalandar as he was a wandering spiritual man.

Lal Shahbaz Qalandar is sometimes called Jhulelal (Sindhi: جھولے لال). The term Jhulelal means "red bridegroom". There are various legends why he was called thus. According to the Garland Encyclopedia, Lal Shahbaz Qalandar was referred to as such because he was promised marriage to a woman but was later refused, which caused him to grief. Another legend relates the name to Jhulelal, a Sindhi deity, whose abode is Indus. As per William Dalrymple, Jhulelal name and legend go together. It was passed down to local Muslim devotees of the saint, many still believe like Jhulelal, Lal Shahbaz controls ebb and flow of Indus.

== Life ==
Lal Shahbaz Qalandar, son of Sayyid Ibrahim Kabiruddin al-Jawabi, was born in Marwand, a small town near Tabriz in present-day Azerbaijan, to a Sayyid family from Baghdad, Iraq. He later settled in Sehwan, Sindh under the reign of the Ghaznavids and Ghurids.

A contemporary of Rumi, he travelled around the Muslim world and settled in Sehwan, Sindh where he was eventually buried. There is evidence of his presence in Sindh in 1196 when he met Pir Haji Ismail Panhwar of Paat. In Sehwan he established a meeting house (khanqah), taught in the Fuqhai Islam Madrasa and wrote his treatises Mizan-us-Surf, Kism-e-Doyum, Aqd and Zubdah. He lived a celibate life.

In Multan, he met Bahauddin Zakariya of the Suhrawardiyya order, Fariduddin Ganjshakar of the Chishtiyya order and Syed Jalaluddin Bukhari. The friendship of these four became legendary. They were known as the Chahar Yar (In Persian "the four friends"). According to some historians, the four saints visited various parts of Sindh and Punjab in present-day Pakistan. This was the time when Ghiyas ud din Balban (r. 1266–1287) ruled in Delhi Sultanate.

It is said Lal Shahbaz Qalandar was a hardened ascetic. When he arrived in Sehwan (then Savistan), there was a shaivites cult of ascetics. He joined the ascetics, was engaged in tapasiya and acts of self-mortification like sitting on a cauldron of fire.

The 19th century spiritual Sufi Manqabat Dama Dam Mast Qalandar is dedicated to Lal Shahbaz Qalandar and is widely popular in the sub-continent.

== Shrine ==
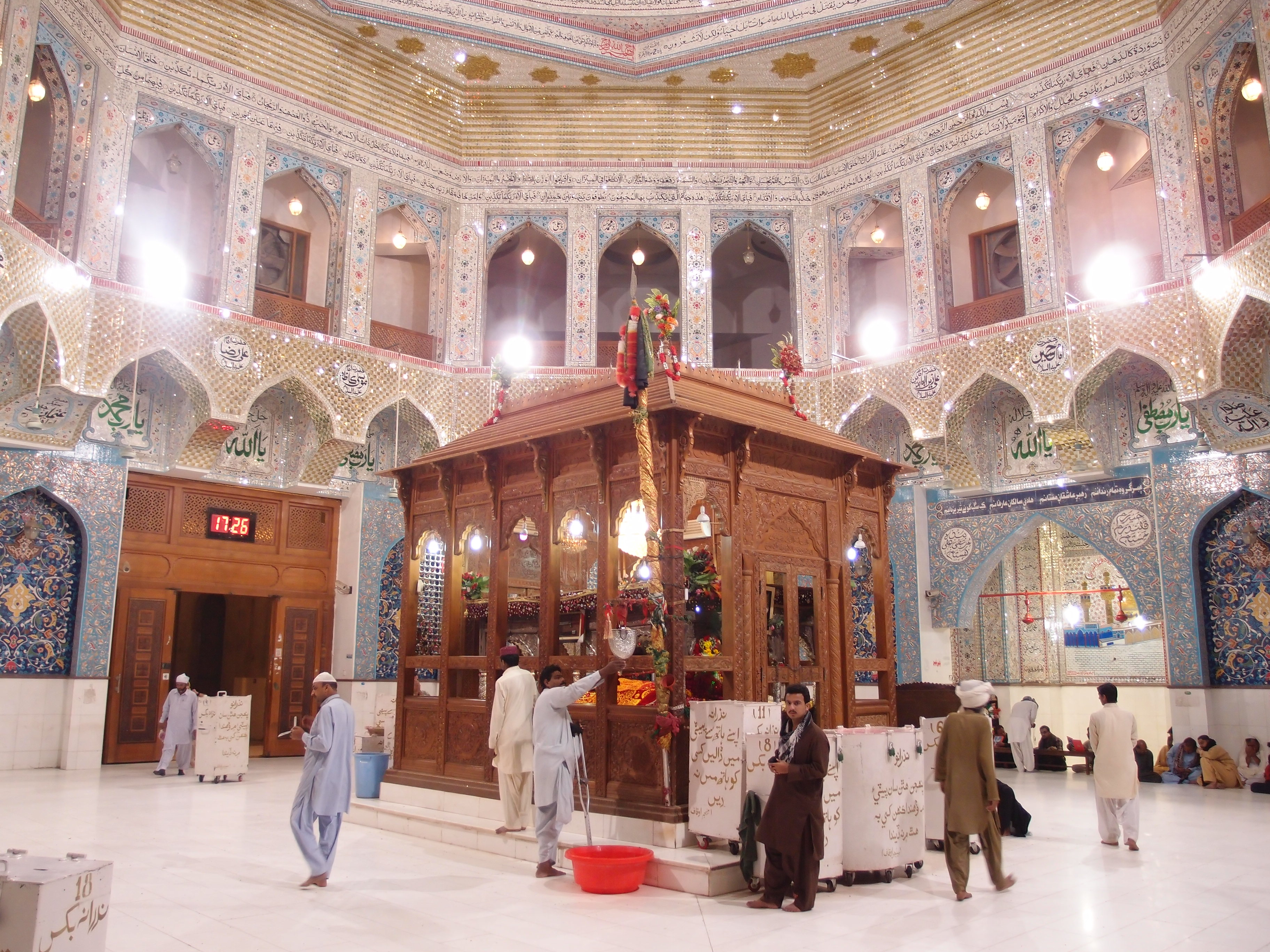
Interior of the shrine of Lal Shahbaz Qalandar in Sehwan

The shrine of Lal Shahbaz Qalandar was built by Firuz Shah Tughlaq in 1356, expanded by Mirza Jani Beg and his son Mirza Ghazi Beg of the Tarkhan dynasty, but was not completed until 1639, when Nawab Dindar Khan paved the courtyard with glazed tiles. The silver work on the gate, the balustrade around the tomb and the top of the dome was gifted by Mir Karam Ali Talpur of the Talpur dynasty. Later on the shrine was decorated with Sindhi 'kashi-tiles', mirror-work and a gold-plated door was installed by the late Prime Minister of Pakistan, Zulfikar Ali Bhutto. The inner sanctum is about 100 square yards with a silver-canopied grave in the middle; on one side of the marble floor is a row of about 12-inch-high (300 mm) folding wooden stands, on which there is a set of copies of the Quran for devotees to read. On the other side, beside a bundle of incense, are rows of oil-lamps lighted by devotees. Thousands of devotees visit the tomb particularly every Thursday.

=== Mela / Urs (Annual Fair) ===
Lal Shahbaz's annual Urs (death anniversary), held on the 18 Sha'aban – the eighth month of the Muslim lunar calendar, brings more than two million pilgrims from all over Pakistan and parts of India and Bangladesh. Essentially, it is a South Asian affair.

== See also ==
- Rabia Basri
- Bodla Bahar
- Syed Nadir Ali Shah
