= Nurbakhshi Order =

Sufi order

The Nurbakhshi Sufi Order, known as Silsila e Zahab Sufiya Imamiya Nurbakhshiya; Arabic: سلسلۃ الزھب صوفیہ نوربخشیہ among its followers, is a Sufi order that branched off from the Kubrawiya and Hamdaniya orders when the Persian Sufi master Shah Syed Muhammad Nurbakhsh (d. 1465 CE) became its 20th Qutb in 1442.

== History ==
Syed Muhammad Nurbakhsh was born in Qaen, Iran, in 1392 CE. He is said to have sharp mind and became Hafiz at the age of 7 the proceeded to Hillah, Iraq, where he studied Islamic jurisprudence at prominent seminaries under scholars such as Ibn Fahad al-Hilli.

His interests in Sufism, which was in currency in Iran back then, took him to Herat and eventually to Khatlan, where he joined the Khanaqah of Khwaja Ishaq Khatlani (the spiritual successor to Mir Sayyid Ali Hamadani in the Hamdaniya order). Nurbakhsh earned such high regard from Khwaja Ishaq that the master eventually pledged Bay'ah on his hand which is rarely recorded in Sufism history.

This decision angered by another disciple, Syed Abdullah Barzishabadi, who parted his ways with Khwaja Ishaq's decisiion. Khwaja Ishaq famously remarked in Arabic, "Zahaba Abdullah" ("Abdullah has left"), though Barzishabadi's followers reinterpreted the phrase as "Dhahab Abdullah" ("Abdullah has become gold"). This schism led to the formation of the Dhahabiyya (Zahbiya) order , which continues to be followed by some Shia Sufis in Iran today.

The Nurbakhshi order had significant followings across Iran—particularly in regions like Khorasan, Ray, Tehran, Gilan, and Shiraz—as well as in Kashmir and Baltistan, where it was introduced by Mir Shams ud-Din Iraqi. Places like in Tajikistan, Badkhashan (as stated by Duglat), Kurdistan and Turkeye are reported to had presence of Nurbakhshis.

Some historians see Nurbakhshi movement as a transitional phase during medieval Sunni majority Iran's shift toward a Shia-majority state. Following the rise of the Safavid Empire, most Nurbakhshis in Iran gradually merged into mainstream Twelver Shi'ism, losing their separate identity.

=== Influence and Persecution in Kashmir ===
The Nurbakhshis played a pivotal role in medieval Kashmir, particularly under Chak dynasties. The Chak rulers embraced Nurbakhshi doctrine and adopted the Fiqh-i-Ahwat (the primary book on Nurbakhshi jurisprudence) as state law.

However, during the reign of Mirza Muhammad Haidar Dughlat, the Nurbakhshis were targetted. Dughlat famously boasted that no one in Kashmir dared openly identify as a Nurbakhshi during his rule. Prominent masters were executed—including Mir Daniyal Shaheed, the son of Mir Shams ud-Din Iraqi—and key Nurbakhshi texts were systematically burned. This hostility stemmed largely from Dughlat's opposition to Shi'ism, as he viewed the Nurbakhshis as essentially Shia.

Fleeing persecution, many Kashmiri Nurbakhshis took refuge in Baltistan, where they were welcomed by the local Balti Rajas. Over time, the Nurbakhshis who remained in Kashmir largely assimilated into the broader Twelver Shia community, while others adopted Sunni Islam.

Today, historical Kashmiri Nurbakhshi figures like Mir Iraqi and Mir Daniyal are primarily remembered as Shia spiritual leaders, while their specific association with the Nurbakhshi tradition has faded from public memory.

=== In Iran ===
In Iran, Shah Qasim Faiz Bakhsh succeeded his father, Shah Syed Nurbakhsh, as head of the order and was highly revered by the Timurid ruler Sultan Husayn Bayqara. The order maintained its distinct identity in Iran for three to four generations before ultimately assimilating into Twelver Shi'ism.

== Modern-Day Nurbakhshis ==
In Pakistan and IndiaThe majority of contemporary Nurbakhshis live in Baltistan (Gilgit-Baltistan, Pakistan) as well as the Ladakh region (primarily Kargil and the Nubra Valley in India). Once the dominant community in Baltistan, they currently constitute roughly 25 to 30 percent of the region's population, numbering between 150,000 and 200,000.Rather than categorizing themselves strictly as Sunni or Shia, modern Nurbakhshis view their faith as an independent Islamic tradition, despite sharing significant doctrinal and jurisprudential commonalities with Twelver Shi'ism.

=== Spirtual lineage ===
Till Mir Mukhtar Akhyar the silsila was present in Kashmir, however he moved to Baltistan permanently.

=== Qutb genealogy ===
Noorbakshia genealogy

From Imam Reza (Silsila Zahab):
1. Ma'ruf al-Karkhi	2. Sari al-Saqati	3. Junayd of Baghdad (Silsila Junaidia)	4. Abu Zar Rudbari	5. Abu Ali Katebi
6. Abu Usman Al-Maghribi	7. Abul Qasim Gurgani	8. Abubakr Nassaji	9. Ahmad Ghazali
10. Abu al-Najib Suhrawardi (Silsila e Suhrawardia)	11. Ammar Yaser Bedlisi
12. Najm al-Din Kubra (Kubrawiya Silsila)	13. Ali Ibn lala Ghaznavi	14. Ahmed Zakir Jurjani	15. Abdul Rehman Asfraini	16. 'Ala' al-Dawla Simnani	17. Mahmoud Mazdaqani
18. Mir Sayyid Ali Hamadani(Silsila e Hamdania)	19. Khwaja Ishaq Khatlani
20. Shah Syed Muhammad Noorbaksh (Silsila Nurbakshia)
21. Shah Qasim Faiz Baksh	22. Mir Shams-ud-Din Araqi	23. Mir Daniyal Shaheed	24. Mir Shamsudin Rasheed	25. Mir Hassan Rehnuma
26. Mir Daniyal Dana	27. Mir Abu Saeed Sauda	28. Mir Mukhtar Akhyar	29. Mir Jalal ud Din Muhammad Masoom	30. Mir Najam ud Din Saqib
31. Mir Jalal din Masoom	32. Mir Muhammad Noorani	33. Mir Muhammad Shah Makhdom ul Fuqra	34. Mir Shah Jalal Syed ul Akhyiar	35. Mir Syed Khana elom Fakhr ul Akhiyar
36. Mir Muhammad Akbar Sharaf ul Akhiyar	37. Mir Muhammad Shah Zain ul Akhiyar	38. Mir Syed Aun Ali Shah Aun ul Momineen
39. Mir Syed Muhammad Shah Noorani (current)

=== In Iran ===
Unlike the Nurbakhshis of Baltistan and Ladakh, contemporary Nurbakhshis in Iran do not identify as a separate sect following Nurbakhshi Fiqh. Instead, they view themselves as a Sufi tariqa within Twelver Shi'ism, adhering to living Shia mujtahids rather than Syed Nurbakhsh for matters of legal jurisprudence (fiqh).

=== Awaisiya Nurbakhshia ===
Few Sufi lineages with a very small presence in Iran trace their spiritual chain (silsila) back to Shah Syed Nurbakhsh, most notably the Maktab Oveyssi Nurbakhshi (الهیه ختمیه اویسیه خفیفیه کبرویه نوربخشیه شاه مقصودی). Sadiq Anqa is current spiritual Qutab of same silsila

=== Nematullahi Order ===
A faction of Ni'matullāhī order in Iran also enlist Syed Muhammad Nurbaksh and Shaikh Asiri Lahiji (Khalifa of Nurbakhsh in Sheraz) as secondary source of their lineage.

== See also ==
- Noorbakhshia Islam (as a school of Islamic Jurisprudence).
