= Khwaja Ishaq Khatlani =

خواجہ Khawaja Ishaq Khatlani
- خواجہ اسحٰق ختلانی
- Title: خواجہ

Personal life
- Born: c. 1334 CE (735 AH) Khatlan (present-day Tajikistan)
- Died: 1423 (aged 88–89) (823 AH) Balkh
- Resting place: Khatlan, Balkh (present-day Tajikistan، Afghanistan)
- Other names: خواجہ; شاہ شہید

Religious life
- Religion: Islam
- Denomination: Nurbakshia
- Jurisprudence: Shah Syed Muhammad Nurbaksh
- Tariqa: Kubrawiya & Nurbakshia order

Muslim leader
- Predecessor: Mir Sayyid Ali Hamadani
- Successor: Shah Syed Muhammad Nurbaksh

Ishaq ibn Ameer Aram Shah Ismail (1334 - 1423) commonly known as Khwaja Ishaq Khatlani was a sufi master of Kubrawiya order after the death of Ameer e Kabir Syed Ali Hamdani from Khatlan, Tajikistan.

== Early Life ==
He was born in an aristocratic and wealthy family of Khatlan. His father Amir Aram Shah had drawn animosity of Ameer Taimur as he was follower of Mir Syed Ali Hamdani. His grandfather Mubarak Shah bin Ali Shah was said to be an influential person of his time.

== Sufi Life ==
In 1371 AD, his father Aram Shah was visited by Mir Syed Ali Hamadani. Hamadani was a sufi master and extensive traveller around the world and gained immense respect in Khatlan. He used stay at Khatalani's father house during visit to Khatlan. Ishaq entered his circle as a disciple. In Zabda tul Manaqib, Jafer Badkhashi noted how Hamdani praised Ishaq along with Shams ud Din (who also brother of Ishaq) for their devotion and piety in way Islam and sufism. He also married Mah e Khurasan daughter of Mir Hamadani. The only son of Mir Hamadani - Syed Mir Muhammad Hamdani (also known as Amir e Khurd) in Ishaq's house in 1375. Amir Khurd became a disciple of Khawaja Ishaq.

== After Death of Hamdani ==
Ishaq along with Shamsudin was closest to Mir Hamdani and after his death he became 19th sufi master of Kubruwiya order. He established a Khanqah in Khatlan his followers were found from Kashmir to Iran.

== Bay'ah with Syed Nurbaksh ==
In 1414 AD, he became disciple of his own follower Mir Syed Nurbaksh, whom he thought was more elevated in way of spirutualism. This created a rift amongst his followers and reportedly Syed Abdullah Barzish Abadi left Khanqah of Ishaq and his followers became Zahabiya. Meanwhile, Nurbaksh's silsila became popular as Nurbakshia order.

== Revolt againt Mirza Shah Rukh Taimori ==
After gaining many followers, Ishaq convinced Nurbaksh to revolt against Mirza Shahrukh Taimori. The revolt was crushed and Ishaq (along with his brother Shamudin) was killed by Taimori's Governer Bayazid, while Nurbaksh faced a life of trial and torments for almost two decades finally settling down in Soliqan, Iran.

=== Burial Place ===
There is a difference of narrations about his burial place. It is said that his headless body was taken to Kulab, Tajikistan while head was buried in Balkh Afghanistan. Another account said that his skin was stuffed with straws and taken to the streets of Kabul as intimations to rebellions as reported by Afghan writer Ibrahim Khalil in Mazarat e Shahr Kabul:

According to the book Khazinat al-Asrar, his original name was 'Shah Ishaq Khatlani,' renowned as 'Shaheed' (the Martyr) and titled 'Khwaja-e Buzurg' (The Great Khwaja).... During the reign of Shahrukh Mirza, he achieved martyrdom; his blessed body remained in Khatlan, his blessed head in Balkh, and his skin was stuffed with straw and brought to Kabul. The aforementioned book mentions that his stuffed skin was brought to Kabul and buried, but it does not clarify whether it is at this location or at the site of the Shrine of Shah-e Shaheed.

It is also that his head was buried in the locality of Deh Afghanan, Kabul. People in the vicinity revere the tomb as sacred place.

=== Qutb genealogy ===
Noorbakshia genealogy

From Imam Reza (Silsila Zahab):
1. Ma'ruf al-Karkhi	2. Sari al-Saqati	3. Junayd of Baghdad (Silsila Junaidia)	4. Abu Zar Rudbari	5. Abu Ali Katebi
6. Abu Usman Al-Maghribi	7. Abul Qasim Gurgani	8. Abubakr Nassaji	9. Ahmad Ghazali
10. Abu al-Najib Suhrawardi (Silsila e Suhrawardia)	11. Ammar Yaser Bedlisi
12. Najm al-Din Kubra (Kubrawiya Silsila)	13. Ali Ibn lala Ghaznavi	14. Ahmed Zakir Jurjani	15. Abdul Rehman Asfraini	16. 'Ala' al-Dawla Simnani	17. Mahmoud Mazdaqani
18. Mir Sayyid Ali Hamadani(Silsila e Hamdania)	19. Khwaja Ishaq Khatlani
20. Shah Syed Muhammad Noorbaksh (Silsila Nurbakshia)
21. Shah Qasim Faiz Baksh	22. Mir Shams-ud-Din Araqi	23. Mir Daniyal Shaheed	24. Mir Shamsudin Rasheed	25. Mir Hassan Rehnuma
26. Mir Daniyal Dana	27. Mir Abu Saeed Sauda	28. Mir Mukhtar Akhyar	29. Mir Jalal ud Din Muhammad Masoom	30. Mir Najam ud Din Saqib
31. Mir Jalal din Masoom	32. Mir Muhammad Noorani	33. Mir Muhammad Shah Makhdom ul Fuqra	34. Mir Shah Jalal Syed ul Akhyiar	35. Mir Syed Khana elom Fakhr ul Akhiyar
36. Mir Muhammad Akbar Sharaf ul Akhiyar	37. Mir Muhammad Shah Zain ul Akhiyar	38. Mir Syed Aun Ali Shah Aun ul Momineen
39. Mir Syed Muhammad Shah Noorani (current)
