= Zahabiya =

Iranian Sufi mystic order in Shia Islam

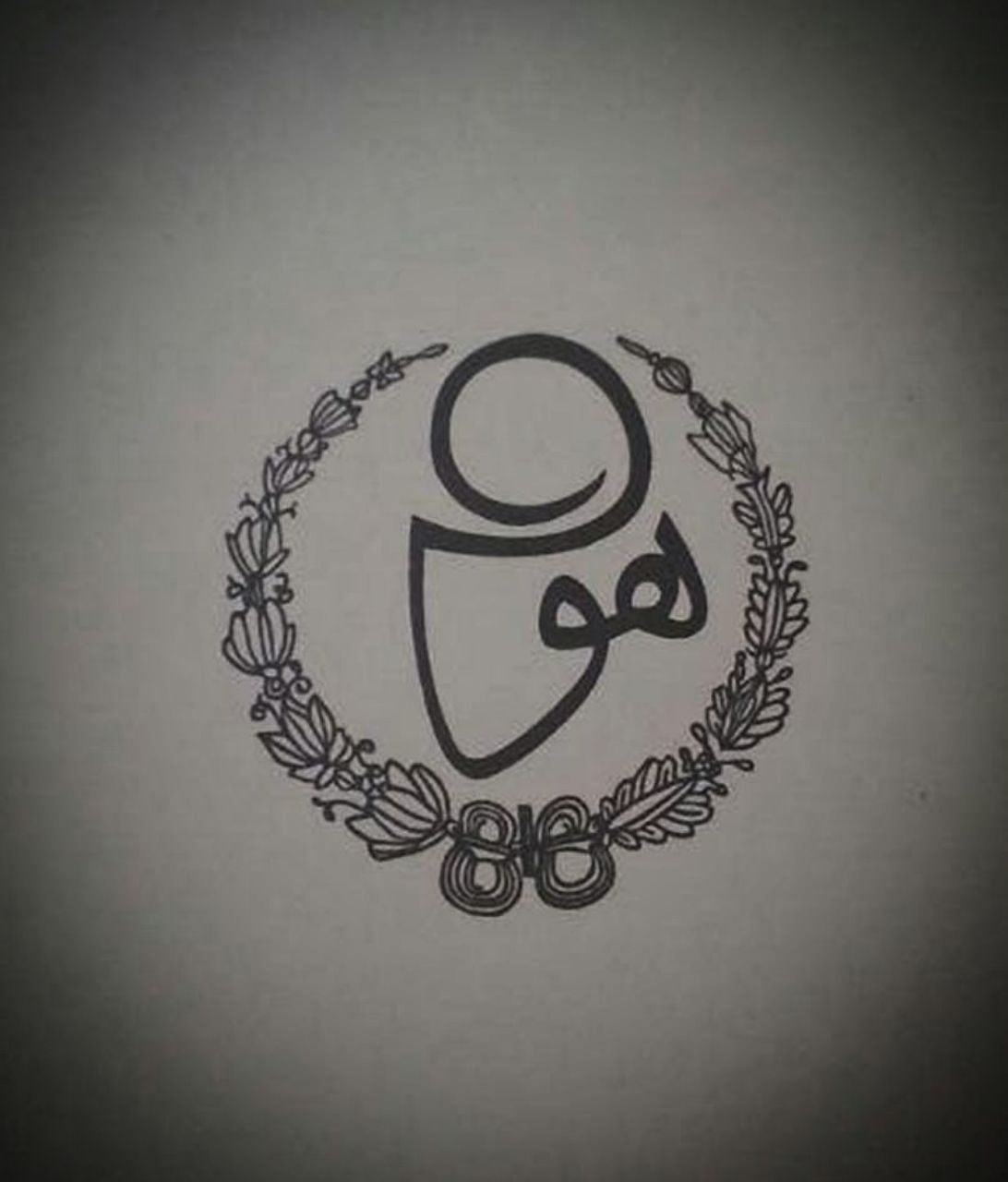
Hu (sign of the Zahabiya order)

Zahabiya Sufism (Persian: سلسله ذهبیه, Zahabiya Silsila) is a Shiite order. The history of dervishes from this order dates to the third century AH and Ma'ruf al-Karkhi. Some believe that the order originated during the ninth century AH in Iran; it first became popular in Khorasan and then in Shiraz during the early Safavid period.

== History ==
Zahabiya is a Sufi order of Shia Islam which has its roots from the ninth century AH, composed of followers of Seyyed Abdullah Borzeshabadi Mashhadi. In Iran, after the formation of the Safavid state, the order spread and other orders branched out from it. For this reason, it is known as "Umm al-Salasel" ("mother of the branches"). The order originated from the Sufi Kubrawiya order of Mir Sayyid Ali Hamadani. Zahabiya is a silsila (chain of lineage) of the tariqa (school) of Kubrawiya. It was considered it to be a Sunni order before Borzeshabadi but became Shiite afterwards, especially after the Safavids forced conversion of Iran to Shia Islam.

== Possible founders ==
There are several theories about Zahabiya's founder. Its founder has been believed to be Najm al-Din Kubra, who died in 1221 CE (618 AH). His nickname was "Abu al-Janab". He was the twelfth Qutb (saint) of the Zahabiya order. His titles are Sheikh Wali Tarash, Kubra and Tama Al-Kubra, and Zahabiya later became known as the Zahabiya Kubrawiya. His title was "Tama Al-Kubra" (Doomsday). He won arguments with other scholars. "Tama" was later dropped, and he was called "Kubra". The poet Jami wrote about his title of "Wali Tarash" (Wali-maker), "Because in the victories of ecstasy, his blessed sight on whoever fell, reached the position of final enlightenment". He had many followers, some of whom were well-known Sufis such as Majd al-Din Baghdadi (died 1209 CE), Saaduddin Hammuyeh (died 1251), Baba Kamal Jundi, and Razi al-Din Ali Lala Esfarayeni (died 1244). Qazi Nurullah Shustari, in his book Majalis al-muminin cites the number of Najm al-Din Kubra's followers as twelve and writes: "Because his true elders were limited to the twelve Imams, he inevitably observed the number of elders on the part of his disciples and, as it is mentioned the book Tarikh-i guzida, he did not accept more than twelve disciples during his lifetime, but each of them became of the greatest scholar of the time". Najm al-Din Kubra was the son-in-law of Ruzbihan Baqli, and had two sons.

Another founder of Zahabiya order may have been Khajeh Eshaq Khuttalani, who died in 1423 CE (826 AH). He was born c. 1339 CE (740 AH), and was a disciple and son-in-law of Mir Sayyid Ali Hamadani. Twelve disciples are mentioned for him, one of whom was Abdullah Borzeshabadi. During the departure of Muhammad Nurbakhsh Qahistani, Khajeh Eshaq Khuttalani was killed at the order of Shah Rukh as the main agitator against the Timurid Empire.

Seyyed Abdullah Borzeshabadi is also cited as the founder of the order. Seyyed Abdullah ibn Abdul Hai Ali Al-Hussein, nicknamed "Majzoob" ("engrossed"), was from the village of Borzeshabad in Mashhad County, Razavi Khorasan province. Born c. 1368 to 1378 CE (770 to 780 AH), he was the son-in-law of his teacher Khajeh Eshaq Khuttalani and was also taught by Qasim-i Anvar (died 1433). After the death of Khajeh Eshaq Khuttalani, Seyyed Abdullah Borzeshabadi taught for nearly thirty years and died in the early ninth century AH (after 1446 CE). Seyyed Abdullah Borzeshabadi wrote a number oftreatises, including the "Kamaliyeh treatise" (about Irfan and Sharia etiquette). He also wrote lyric poetry.

=== Alternative theory ===
According to some narratives, Khajeh Eshaq Khuttalani (the Qutb of Kubrawiya) saw in a dream a young disciple, Muhammad Nurbakhsh Qahistani, made him his successor (leaves the cloak of Mir Sayyid Ali Hamadani to Muhammad Nurbakhsh Qahistani), and introduceds him as the Mahdi (savior of the world). Khajeh Eshaq Khuttalani entrusted his followers to Muhammad Nurbakhsh Qahistani, but one (Seyyed Abdullah Borzeshabadi) refuses to obey him and leaves. Khajeh Eshaq Khuttalani said, "Zahaba Abdullah" ("Abdullah is gone"). The road taken by Seyyed Abdullah Borzeshabadi became known as Zahabiya, a branch of the Kubrawiya order.

== Qutb ==
Sufis believe that a seeker should follow the one who leads him, and a Sufi should choose a mentor. This guide is known as pir ("elder"), wali ("guardian"), sheikh ("lord, master") and Qutb (a perfect human). A Qutb is a person who is in the sight of God and like the heart of Muhammad. A Qutb is also called Abdul Elah ("servant of God").

Asadullah Khavari introduced Qutb from the point of view of Zahabiya: "The meaning of the Qutb in Zahabiya view is perfect men and partial saints who have attained degrees and perfections through conduct and divine passion, and after the stage of annihilation [of the Ego], revived by God and they have reached the degree of the understanding of the immediate guardian of God and the owner of time, who is the Qutb of all Qutbs of the time."

=== Qutb genealogy ===
In the appendices of the book Tohfeh Abbasi, the names of the Qutbs of Zahabiya order are listed in the following order:

Zahabiya genealogy

From Imam Reza through:
1. Ma'ruf al-Karkhi	2. Sari al-Saqati	3. Junayd of Baghdad	4. Abu Usman Al-Maghribi	5. Abu Ali al-Rudbari
6. Abu Ali Kateb Mesri	7. Abul Qasim Gurgani	8. Abubakr Nassaj Toosi	9. Ahmad Ghazali	10. Abu al-Najib Suhrawardi
11. Ammar Yaser Bedlisi	12. Najm al-Din Kubra	13. Majduddin Baghdadi	14. Raziuddin Ali Lala	15. Ahmad Jurfani (Gurpani)
16. Nooreddin Abdulrahman Esfarayeni	17. 'Ala' al-Dawla Simnani	18. Mahmoud Mazdaqani	19. Mir Sayyid Ali Hamadani	20. Khajeh Eshaq Khuttalani
21. Seyyed Abdullah Borzeshabadi	22. Rashiduddin Mohammad Bidaavaazi	23. Shah Ali Esfarayeni	24. Mohammad Khabushani	25. Qolamali Neyshaburi
26. Tajuddin Hossein Tabadakani	27. Mohammad Karandehi	28. Hatam Zaravandi Khorasani	29. Mohammad Ali Moazzen Khorasani	30. Najibuddin Reza Tabrizi
31. Ali Naghi Estahbanati	32. Seyyed Qutb al-Din Mohammad Neyrizi	33. Agha Mohammad Hashem Darvish Shirazi	34. Mirza Abdunnabi Sharifi Shirazi	35. Mirza Abulghasem Raz Shirazi
36. Jalaleddin Mohammad Majdolashraf Shirazi	37. Mirza Ahmad Abdulhay Mortazavi Tabrizi	38. Abulfotuh Haaj Mirza Mohammad Ali Hobb Heydar	39. Abdulhamid Ganjavian	40. Hossein Asaarian

=== Qutb of Nateq-Samet ===
In Zahabiya, the Qutb (the current leader) is called Qutb-e Nateq ("the rhetorical Qutb"); his successor is called Qutb-e Samet ("the silent Qutb") during the life of Qutb-e Nateq. These terms are also used by the Shiite Isma'ilism sect.

== Other names ==
Zahabiya is the best-known name of the order, but it is also known as Elahieh, Mohammadiyyah, Alawiyah, Razaviyyah, Mahdieh, Marufiyah, Kubrawiya, and Ahmadiyya. The latter name was bestowed by Mirza Ahmad Abdulhay Mortazavi Tabrizi (known as Vahid al-Owlia, the 37th Qutb of Zahabiya).

Mohammad Ali Moazzen Khorasani (the 29th Qutb of Zahabiya) cites Umm al-Salasel ("mother of the branches") as a name for Zahabiya: "In Iran, after the formation of the Safavid dynasty and the promotion of the Shiite religion, only the Zahabiya order, which was specific to the Shiites, expanded; and for this reason, it is also called Umm al-Salasl because over the last few centuries, many branches have been formed of it."

The order is said to have been named Zahabiya ("golden") because its Qutbs practice an alchemy of the soul; a seeker becomes spiritually refined, like gold. Until a seeker reaches this level of purity, they cannot guide anyone. There were no Sunnis person in the order; their elders and guardians were all Twelvers. The Hadith of Golden Chain is also considered to authorize the order.

== Claims ==
A number of claims have been made about the authenticity of Zahabiya genealogy. The order has been attributed to The Fourteen Infallibles. Some followers believe that it originated with Imam Reza (the eighth Shiite Imam) through Ma'ruf al-Karkhi. Imam Reza was a descendant of Muhammad. Ma'ruf al-Karkhi was a mystic from Karkh in Baghdad. Born c. 750–760 CE, he reportedly died in 815 CE (200 AH). It was said that fourteen sects, known as the Marufiyah sects, branched out from him. Ma'ruf al-Karkhi's connection to, and meeting with, Imam Reza and his conversion to Islam are somewhat controversial. Some (including Ibn al-Husayn al-Sulami in his book, Tabaqat al-Sufiah) believe that he was converted by Imam Reza; Ali Hujwiri wrote: "Ma'ruf al-Karkhi was converted to Islam by Imam Reza, and was very dear to him." In the book, Wafyat al-A'yan, Ibn Khallikan mentioned Ma'ruf al-Karkhi's conversion to Islam by Imam Reza and considered him one of the Imam's patrons. According to some sources, Ma'ruf al-Karkhi's Christian parents also converted to Islam after he did. He was described elsewhere as Imam Reza's gatekeeper. Ma'ruf al-Karkhi broke a bone in a crowd at the imam's house and later died. In the book, Tazkirat al-Awliya, Attar of Nishapur wrote that he became ill after the fracture; according to other sources, he was disabled for the rest of his life.

Others question a connection between Ma'ruf al-Karkhi and Imam Reza. The story of Ma'ruf al-Karkhi's conversion to Islam and his responsibility as gatekeeper was first told by Ibn al-Husayn al-Sulami without documentation. Others who told this story after him narrated it in the form of a messenger. Ma'ruf al-Karkhi was not mentioned in any rijali dealing with the companions and patrons of the imams. According to Ayatollah Borqei, "There is no name of "Ma'ruf al-Karkhi" in the books of Shiite rijals and his condition is unknown and not even a single hadith from him - neither in the principles of religion nor in the ancillaries - has been narrated by the Imams through him and some of the hadiths attributed to him are undocumented and has no evidence." Mohammad-Baqer Majlesi wrote, "Ma'ruf al-Karkhi" is not known to have served Imam Reza and to say that he was the gatekeeper of the Imam is of course wrong; Because all the servants and patrons of that Imam from Sunni and Shiite have been recorded in the books of our rijals and the fanatical Sunnis who used to travel and narrate the hadith of that Imam have mentioned their names, if this man was the patron of that Imam, of course they quoted." Crowds at Imam Reza's house large enough to trample a person are incompatible with the fact that the imam was guarded by the Abbasid caliph al-Ma'mun, and Shiites could not approach the imams. According to Sufi scholars, the position of Qutb cannot be transferred to the next Qutb during the lifetime of the imam who is Qutb at the time. Imam Reza died in 818 CE (203 AH), and Ma'ruf al-Karkhi reportedly died in 815 CE (200 AH). Ma'ruf al-Karkhi was not Qutb during his lifetime, because two Qutbs could not simultaneously exist. However, Sari al-Saqati was a student of Ma'ruf al-Karkhi. According to histories, the al-Ma'mun summoned Imam Reza to Merv in 815 CE (200 AH). The imam traveled to Merv through Basra, Ahvaz and Fars because the cities of Qom and Kufa were Shiite and believed in Ahl al-Bayt; passing through them would support Imam Reza against al-Ma'mun's agents. Morteza Motahhari wrote, "The route that al-Ma'mun chose for Imam Reza was a specific path that did not pass through the Shiite-settled locations because they were afraid of them. Al-Ma'mun ordered not to bring the Imam through Kufa, to bring him to Nishapur through Basra, Khuzestan and Fars". There was no mention of a trip to Baghdad for Imam Reza before 815; he lived Medina until that year, and Ma'ruf al-Karkhi never left Baghdad. Therefore, Ma'ruf al-Karkhi could not have been converted to Islam by Imam Reza.

Because followers of Zahabiya attribute their authenticity to Imam Reza through Ma'ruf al-Karkhi, they believe that the imam narrated the Hadith of Golden Chain in Nishapur and the order became known as Zahabiya ("golden"). Ma'ruf al-Karkhi's relationship with Imam Reza is questionable. The Hadith of the Golden Chain is a proof of the guardianship which the imam received from his father and entrusted to his son, Imam Jawad, not something he gave to Ma'ruf al-Karkhi. There is no logical connection between this hadith and the name Zahabiya.

Another claim is that no Sunnis were in the Zahabiya order; its elders and guardians were Twelvers, and their authenticity reaches the Infallible Imam. For this reason, they became known as Zahabiya; like gold, they are free of the disagreement and enmity of the family of Muhammad. However, most Zahabiya Qutbs were Sunni; some, such as Junayd Baghdadi, Ahmad Ghazali, Abul Qasim Gurgani, Abubakr Nassaj Toosi and Abu al-Najib Suhrawardi, were not Twelvers.

Through their Qutbs, Zahabiya seekers' existential copper turns into gold; they became free of materialism and egotistical temptation, and may guide other seekers. However, some Zahabiya Qutbs or followers have moral, political or social problems; some Qutbs have drifted towards Freemasonry. When Seyyed Abdullah Borzeshabadi rebelled and disobeyed the order of his master Khajeh Eshaq Khuttalani to pledge allegiance to Muhammad Nurbakhsh Qahistani, Khajeh Eshaq Khuttalani said: "Zahaba Abdullah" ("Abdullah is gone" or "Abdullah became gold"). For this reason, the order was formed and named Zahabiya. It is sometimes known as Zahabiya Eqteshashiah ("Anarchy Zahabiya") because Sufis called sectarian unrest without the permission of a sect's current leader Eqteshash ("Anarchy"); if it led to the formation of other independent sects, they were identified as baseless and unreliable with the addition of Eqteshashiah.

== Path of growth ==
Asadullah Khavari has divided the history of eleven and a half centuries of the Zahabiya order (from the death of Ma'ruf al-Karkhi, the first Zahabiya Qutb, in 815 CE to the death of Jalaleddin Mohammad Majdolashraf Shirazi, the 36th Zahabiya Qutb in 1913) into five periods:

- The period of asceticism and worship: This period began with the death of Ma'ruf al-Karkhi and ended at the end of the fifth century AH and the death of Abubakr Nassaj Toosi (the eighth Zahabiya Qutb) in 1094 CE (487 AH). During this period, the Zahabiya Qutbs have no written works other than scattered sentences and short words.
- The period of the rise of Sufism, or the period of scholarship and authorship: This period began at the beginning of the sixth century AH with Ahmad Ghazali (the ninth Zahabiya Qutb, who died in 1131 CE) and ended at the end of the ninth century AH and the death of Khajeh Eshaq Khuttalani (the 20th Zahabiya Qutb, who died in 1424 or 1425 CE). Less than a century had passed when the Mongol invasion began, and the defeat of Muhammad II of Khwarazm by the Hulagu Khan ended the Khwarazmian Empire in 1231 CE (628 AH). Elders, seekers and disciples produced literature in the Persian language.
- The period of Sufi stagnation: This period lasted from the second half of the ninth century AH and the time of Seyyed Abdullah Borzeshabadi (the 21st Zahabiya Qutb, who died in 1485–1488 CE) to the end of the twelfth century AH and the death of Seyyed Qutb al-Din Mohammad Neyrizi (the 32nd Zahabiya Qutb) in 1760 CE (1173 AH). From the beginning of the ninth century, the basic principle of Sufism (monotheism) weakened and was replaced by the Tawassul with the Alids and their descendants. Higher monastic teachings evolved into dervishes. At this time, Qutbs and elders such as Seyyed Qutb al-Din Mohammad Neyrizi, Mohammad Ali Moazzen Khorasani (the 29th Zahabiya Qutb) and Najibuddin Reza Tabrizi (the 30th Qutb) emerged.
- The Walayah period: This period began at the end of the twelfth century AH and the beginning of the guidance of Agha Mohammad Hashem Darvish Shirazi (the 33rd Qutb) in 1760 CE, and ended in the early fourteenth century AH and the death of Jalaleddin Mohammad Majdolashraf Shirazi (the 36th Qutb) in 1913 (1331 AH). Sufism and its monastic teachings evolved from monotheism into the Walayah and guardianship of the imams, and Shia Islam turned from outward customs inward to the guardianship. From this period, many works by Agha Mohammad Hashem Darvish Shirazi, Jalaleddin Mohammad Majdolashraf Shirazi and Mirza Abulghasem Raz Shirazi (the 35th Qutb) survive.
- Sufi modern period: From the beginning of the fourteenth century AH to the early 1990s, modern works have influenced Sufism.

== Walayah ==
Zahabiya has divided the Walayah (religious guardianship) into two parts:

1. The Walayah of the whole: Shamsiya ("Sun")
2. The Walayah of the part: Qamariya ("Moon")

According to Zahabiya, Shamsiya belongs to Muhammad and his twelve descendants. Qamariya also belongs to Sufi elders and Qutbs. Since all beings in the universe have to reach perfection and humanity through a perfect human being, and Mahdi is in occultation, a person who has Qamariya from Mahdi is always present like the Moon which reflects the light of the Sun, purifies the mirror of the heart and illuminates the world. For this reason, he is the instructor of the lunar world and obtains light from the Sun. Zahabiya believes that the authenticity of its Qamariya reaches Imam Reza through Ma'ruf al-Karkhi, and the authenticity of its Shamsiya leads to Muhammad through Imam Reza and his ancestors.

== Exaggeration and esotericism ==
Some believe that Zahabiya believe in exaggeration (ascribing divine characteristics to figures of Islamic history) and esotericism; the inside of the Quran can be easily understood from its appearance. Zahabiya interprets appearance without analogy; the heart of the mystic is the spiritual house of God, and the Masjid al-Haram is the physical house.

== Monastic ceremonies ==
Zahabiya, like other Sufi orders, is associated with monastic ceremonies in khanqahs. One ceremony is the transfer of the cloak from the current Qutb to the next one. Another is Sama ("listening while dancing"). Another tradition is the culture of mastership and discipleship.

== Place of origin ==
Zahabiya originated in Greater Khorasan and the Khuttal region, the center of the Qutbs and Kubrawiya elders (especially Mir Sayyid Ali Hamadani and Khajeh Eshaq Khuttalani). This region was the center of Zahabiya's Qutbs from the ninth to eleventh centuries AH. The center of Zahabiya order then moved to Shiraz; during the time of Najibuddin Reza Tabrizi (the 30th Qutb), its center moved to Isfahan. Due to the pressure of Islamic jurists during the reign of Sultan Husayn, its center moved back to Shiraz. The order also has followers outside Iran, whose activities continue.

== Criticism ==
Zahabiya was formed with the rebellion and disobedience of Seyyed Abdullah Borzeshabadi at the orders of his master, Khajeh Eshaq Khuttalani, based on allegiance to Muhammad Nurbakhsh Qahistani. It was Shia Islam's first coup. Zahabiya's followers connect their line of Qutbs to Imam Reza through Ma'ruf al-Karkhi and attribute themselves to the Fourteen Infallibles, but there may not have been a connection between the imam and Ma'ruf al-Karkhi. Although they say that all members of this genealogy were Shiites, some have been Sunni. The discussion of Qamariya and its succession is problematic. Their division of Walayah into Shamsiya and Qamariya considers their Qutbs the Walayah of Qamariya without evidence from the Quran and hadiths. Some Qutbs are ethically suspect.

Zahabiya considers their Qutbs and elders as superhuman, and claims to be pure. The hadiths they cite to indicate their authenticity are weak and often invalid. The genealogy of their Qutbs contains gaps, although the existence of a Qutb is obligatory at all times. Zahabiya is related to anarchy, (Eqteshashiah) and its history is vague and unreliable. According to Islamic narratives, Sufism was not approved by Imam Reza. Zahabiya's claims contain superstitions, and some believe that they have corrupted Islam.

== Gallery ==
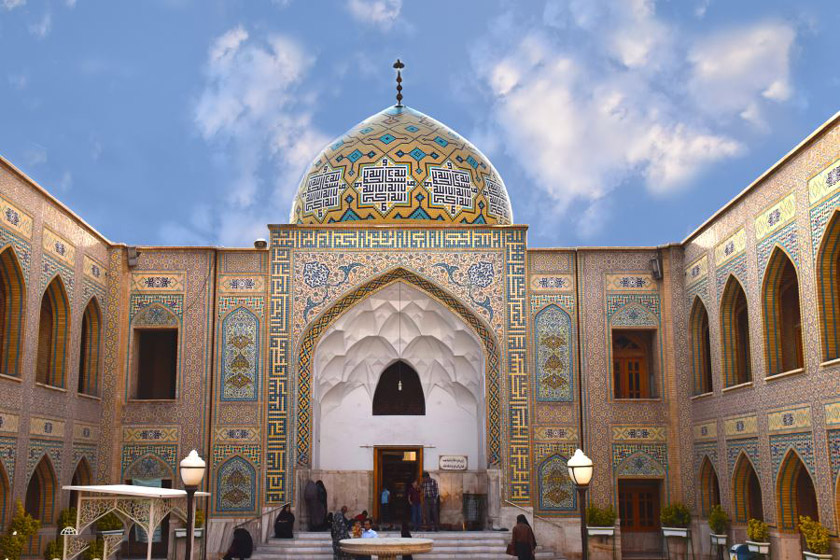
Tomb of Mohammad Karandehi, known as Pire Palandouz (27th Qutb of Zahabiya)

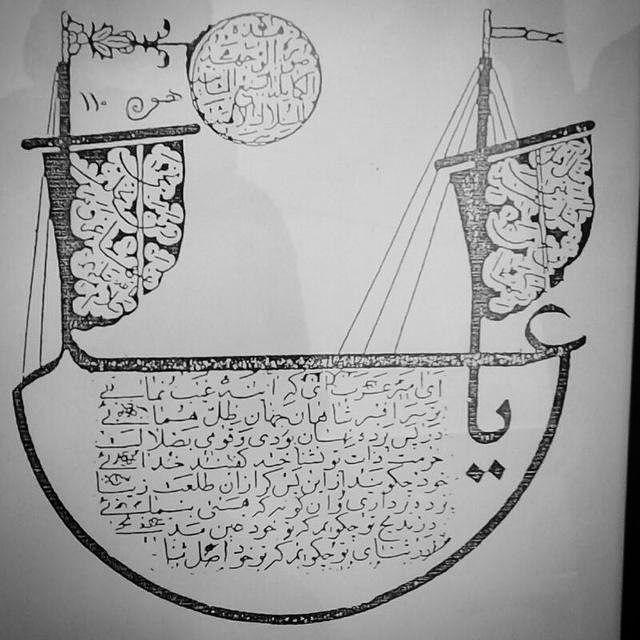
Rescue Ship, a mystical painting by Jalaleddin Mohammad Majdolashraf Shirazi (36th Qutb)

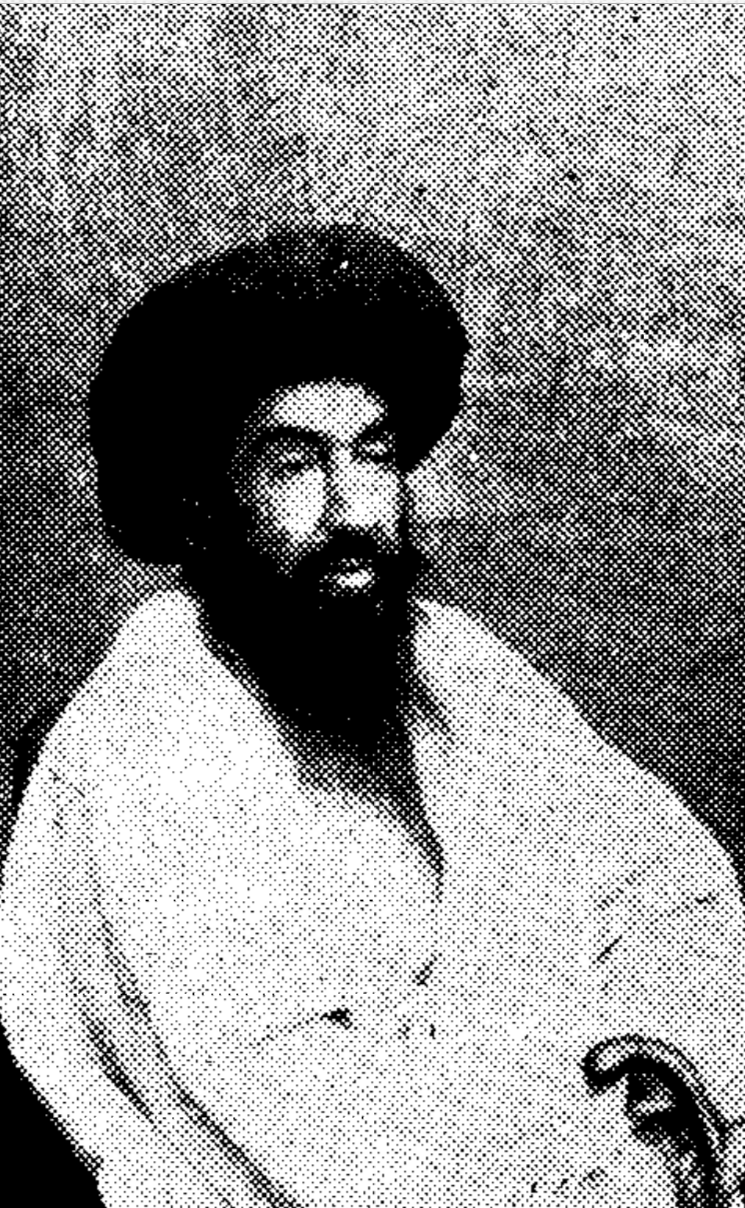
Jalaleddin Mohammad Majdolashraf Shirazi

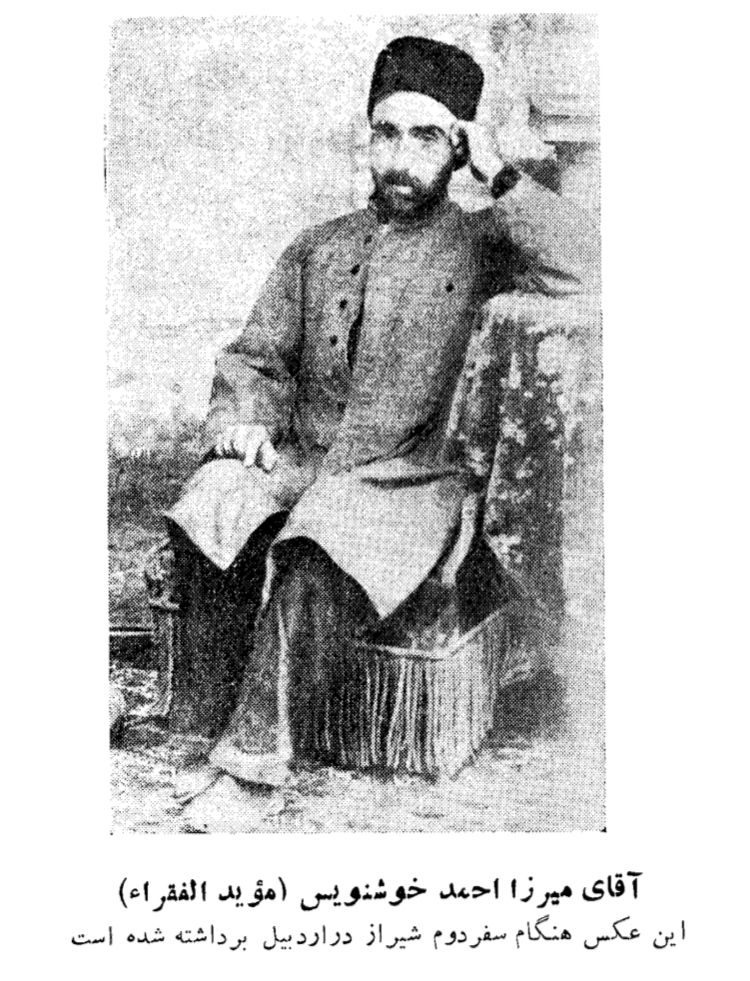
Mirza Ahmad Khoshnevis, 37th Qutb

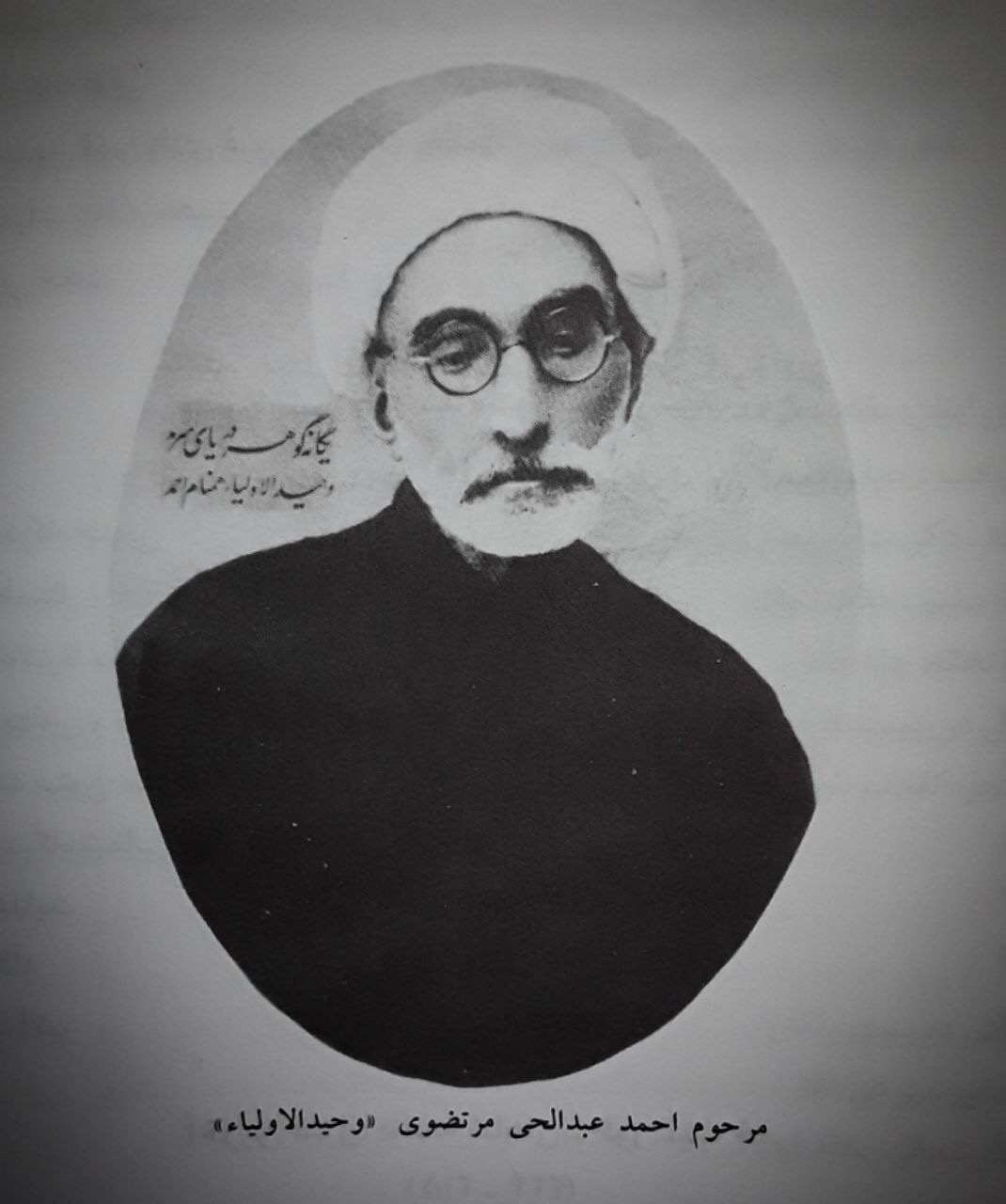
Mirza Ahmad Abdulhay Mortazavi Tabrizi, known as Khoshnevis and Vahid al-Owlia (37th Qutb)

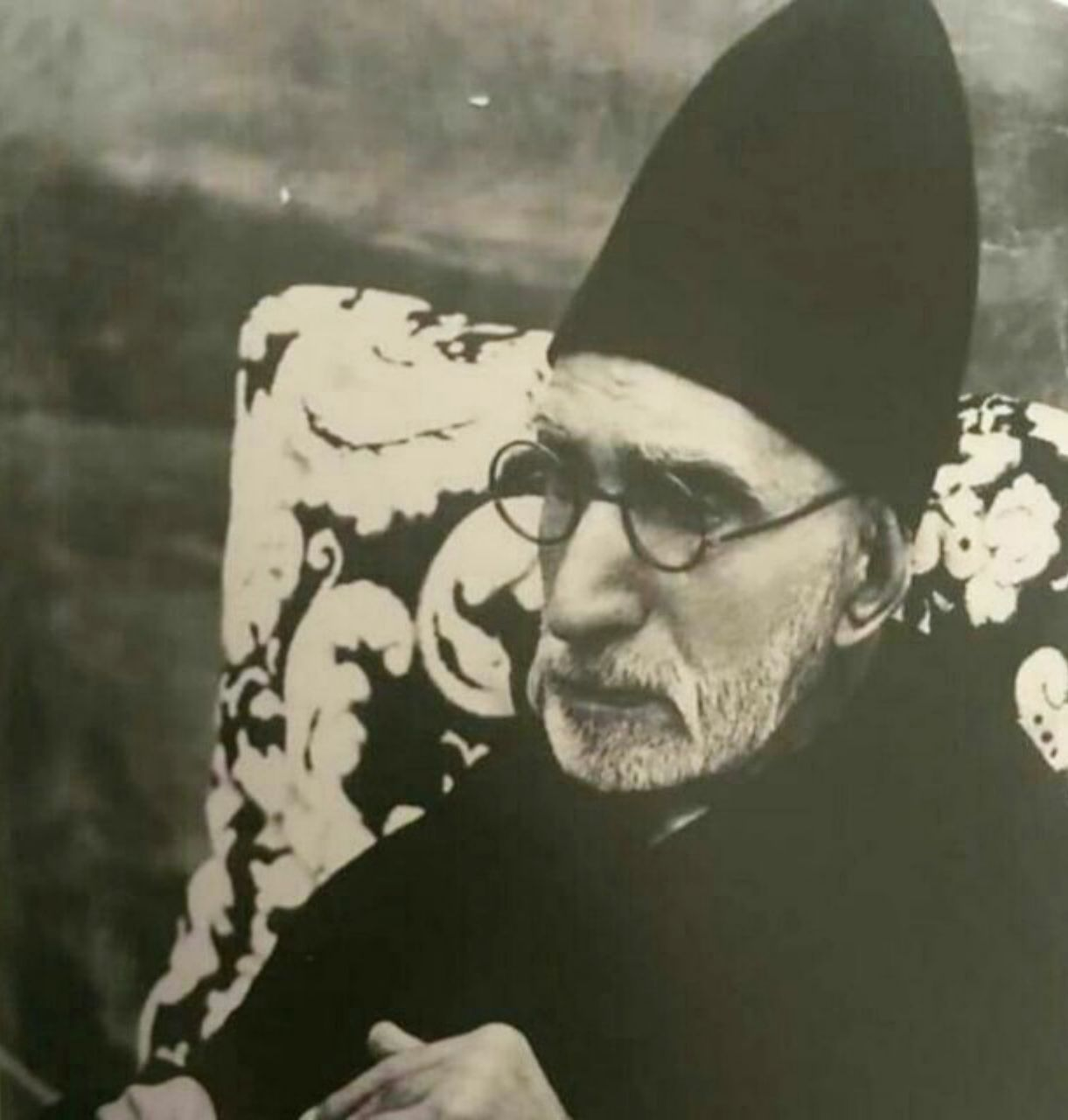
Abulfotuh Haaj Mirza Mohammad Ali Hobb Heydar, 38th Qutb

== See also ==
- Kubrawiya
- Sufi dynasty
- Naqshbandi
- Tijaniyyah
- Senusiyya
- Suhrawardiyya
- Mevlevi Order
- Seyyed Qutb al-Din Mohammad Neyrizi
- List of Sufi orders
