= Syed Muhammad Shah Noorani =

Spiritual leader of Noorbakhshia (born 1951)

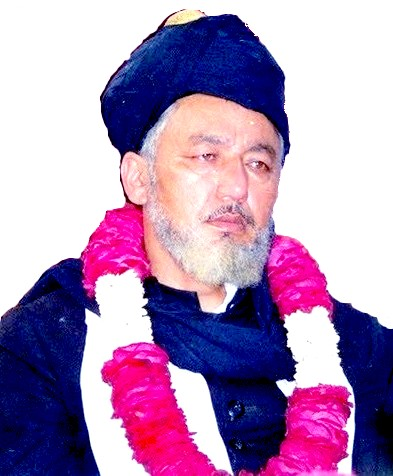

Personal life
- Born: 1951 (age 74–75) Khaplu, Ghanche District, Gilgit-Baltistan
- Era: Modern era
- Region: Gilgit-Baltistan, Pakistan
- Main interest(s): Aqeedah, Fiqh, Tasawwuf

Religious life
- Religion: Islam
- Jurisprudence: Sufism

Muslim leader
- Influenced by: Ali, Shi'a Imams, Syed Aun Ali, Mir Sayyid Ali Hamadani, Khwaja Ishaq Khatlani
- Influenced: Syed Shams ud-Din

Syed Muhammad Shah Noorani (Urdu: سید محمد شاہ نورانی) is the current spiritual leader of the Noorbakhshia Order of Sufism.

== Biography ==
Noorani was born in Khaplu in 1951. He received his early Islamic education from his father and received further education from Syed Ali Shah. He remained a member of the Northern Areas Council from 11 October 1979 to 1983. He became the supreme leader (pir) of Noorbakhshia after the death of his father Syed Aun Ali Shah on 8 November 1991.

== Spirtual lineage ==
=== Qutb genealogy ===
Noorbakshia genealogy

From Imam Reza (Silsila Zahab):
1. Ma'ruf al-Karkhi	2. Sari al-Saqati	3. Junayd of Baghdad (Silsila Junaidia)	4. Abu Zar Rudbari	5. Abu Ali Katebi
6. Abu Usman Al-Maghribi	7. Abul Qasim Gurgani	8. Abubakr Nassaji	9. Ahmad Ghazali
10. Abu al-Najib Suhrawardi (Silsila e Suhrawardia)	11. Ammar Yaser Bedlisi
12. Najm al-Din Kubra (Kubrawiya Silsila)	13. Ali Ibn lala Ghaznavi	14. Ahmed Zakir Jurjani	15. Abdul Rehman Asfraini	16. 'Ala' al-Dawla Simnani	17. Mahmoud Mazdaqani
18. Mir Sayyid Ali Hamadani(Silsila e Hamdania)	19. Khawaja Ishaq Khatlani
20. Shah Syed Muhammad Noorbaksh (Silsila Nurbakshia)
21. Shah Qasim Faiz Baksh	22. Mir Shams-ud-Din Araqi	23. Mir Daniyal Shaheed	24. Mir Shamsudin Rasheed	25. Mir Hassan Rehnuma
26. Mir Daniyal Dana	27. Mir Abu Saeed Sauda	28. Mir Mukhtar Akhyar	29. Mir Jalal ud Din Muhammad Masoom	30. Mir Najam ud Din Saqib
31. Mir Jalal din Masoom	32. Mir Muhammad Noorani	33. Mir Muhammad Shah Makhdom ul Fuqra	34. Mir Shah Jalal Syed ul Akhyiar	35. Mir Syed Khana elom Fakhr ul Akhiyar
36. Mir Muhammad Akbar Sharaf ul Akhiyar	37. Mir Muhammad Shah Zain ul Akhiyar	38. Mir Syed Aun Ali Shah Aun ul Momineen
39. Mir Syed Muhammad Shah Noorani (current)
