= Mir Mukhtar Akhyar =

Mir Mukhtar Akhyar (1653–1719; Urdu: میرمختار اخیار) was a Sufi scholar of the Noorbakshi order in Baltistan. He was the son of Abu Saeed Sauda, a Muslim scholar. He established twelve khanqahs (sufi lodges) around Baltistan. Akhyar translated the book Fiqh-i-Ahwat (the book of jurisprudence) also known as the Siraj-ul-Islam written in Arabic by his teacher Shah Syed Muhammad Nurbakhsh Qahistani. He died in 1719 or 1722. His grave is in Keris, Khaplu.

Mukhtar Akhyar helped to consolidate the Noorbakshi order in Baltistan and Ladakh by establishing several mosques and khanqahs throughout the region.

== Nurbakshia Sufi Order ==
=== Qutb genealogy ===
Noorbakshia genealogy

From Imam Reza (Silsila Zahab):
1. Ma'ruf al-Karkhi	2. Sari al-Saqati	3. Junayd of Baghdad (Silsila Junaidia)	4. Abu Zar Rudbari	5. Abu Ali Katebi
6. Abu Usman Al-Maghribi	7. Abul Qasim Gurgani	8. Abubakr Nassaji	9. Ahmad Ghazali
10. Abu al-Najib Suhrawardi (Silsila e Suhrawardia)	11. Ammar Yaser Bedlisi
12. Najm al-Din Kubra (Kubrawiya Silsila)	13. Ali Ibn lala Ghaznavi	14. Ahmed Zakir Jurjani	15. Abdul Rehman Asfraini	16. 'Ala' al-Dawla Simnani	17. Mahmoud Mazdaqani
18. Mir Sayyid Ali Hamadani(Silsila e Hamdania)	19. Khawaja Ishaq Khatlani
20. Shah Syed Muhammad Noorbaksh (Silsila Nurbakshia)
21. Shah Qasim Faiz Baksh	22. Mir Shams-ud-Din Araqi	23. Mir Daniyal Shaheed	24. Mir Shamsudin Rasheed	25. Mir Hassan Rehnuma
26. Mir Daniyal Dana	27. Mir Abu Saeed Sauda	28. Mir Mukhtar Akhyar	29. Mir Jalal ud Din Muhammad Masoom	30. Mir Najam ud Din Saqib
31. Mir Jalal din Masoom	32. Mir Muhammad Noorani	33. Mir Muhammad Shah Makhdom ul Fuqra	34. Mir Shah Jalal Syed ul Akhyiar	35. Mir Syed Khana elom Fakhr ul Akhiyar
36. Mir Muhammad Akbar Sharaf ul Akhiyar	37. Mir Muhammad Shah Zain ul Akhiyar	38. Mir Syed Aun Ali Shah Aun ul Momineen
39. Mir Syed Muhammad Shah Noorani (current)

== See also ==
- Khanqah-e-Mualla Noorbakshia Khaplu Bala
