= Mir Shams-ud-Din Araqi =

Muslim preacher and mystic

Mir Syed Shams-ud-Din Arāqi
- میر شمس الدین عراقی
- Title: میر سید شمس الدین عراقی

Personal life
- Born: 13 September 1440 (13 Rajab 861 AH) Isfahan, Iran
- Died: 28 January 1515 (aged 74) (01 Rabīʿ al-ʾAwwal 936 AH) Srinagar, Kashmir Valley, (Present-day India)
- Resting place: Tomb of Shams-ud-Din Araqi, Chadoora, Kashmir Valley
- Other name: Hazrat Syed Muhammad Musavi Isfahani

Religious life
- Religion: Islam
- Tariqa: Noorbakshia

Muslim leader
- Based in: Srinagar, Jammu and Kashmir
- Post: Allama, Sufi cleric
- Period in office: 1460–1515
- Predecessor: Mir Syed Ibrahim Musavi Isfahani
- Successor: Mir Syed Daniyal Araqi

Mir Syed Shams-ud-Din Muhammad Arāqi (Note: Also spelt Shams-ud-Din Iraqi, Shamsuddin Iraqi, Shams al-Din Iraqi, in dua Pir Shams Cota.) (Persian: میر شمس الدین محمد عراقی; c. 1440–1515) was an Iranian wali (Sufi saint). Araqi was part of the order of Noorbakshia Islam in Jammu and Kashmir who greatly influenced the social fabric of the Kashmir Valley and its surrounding regions.

== Early life ==
Araqi was born in Kundala, a village near Suliqan, to Darvish Ibrahim and Firuza Khatun. Darvish was a Sufi dedicated to Muhammad Nurbakhsh Qahistani while Firuza was descended from a Sayyid family from Qazvin. As an adolescent, Araqi first encountered Nurbakhsh when the latter arrived in Suliqan but was told by Nurbakhsh himself not to engage in Sufi devotions due to family responsibilities. Soon after Nurbaksh's death around 1464, Araqi visited his grave and chose to follow the Noorbakshia path.

== Career in Herat ==
Soon after deciding to join the Noorbakshia order, Araqi spent nineteen years traveling and studying under various khanqah masters throughout Iran and Iraq. He eventually rose in the order's hierarchy and became settled in Durusht near Tehran under master Qasim Fayzbakhsh.

When Timurid Sultan Husayn Bayqara invited Qasim to join his court at Herat, Araqi accompanied him. In Herat, Araqi apparently undertook a mission for Bayqara to investigate if a king from Iraq was planning to conquer parts of Khurasan under Timurid control. Once back in Herat after determining that the plans were untrue, Araqi and Qasim were given rewards and elevated positions within the court.

Soon after the earlier mission, Araqi was sent as an envoy of Bayqara to Kashmir under the pretext of a diplomatic visit to the Kashmir royal court and gathering medicinal herbs for Qasim. However, the embassy is not mentioned in Timurid histories and Qasim seems to have been the main supporter of the mission, likely meaning that the main purpose of the assignment was to expand the Noorbakshia order into Kashmir.

== Career in Kashmir ==
From Herat, Araqi traveled to Multan and eventually arrived in Kashmir at around 1483. He was greeted by Sultan Hasan Shah and subsequently resided in Kashmir for 8 years. Initially taking the role of an ambassador, he eventually became an independent religious missionary. Araqi established himself in various khanqahs or other venues during his stay and attracted followers to his order. However, Araqi also faced several political conflicts with other scholars in the royal court during this period. Around 1491, Araqi left Kashmir to return to Durusht but appointed one of his students, Mulla Ismail, to lead the order.

Araqi returned to Kashmir in 1503 after hearing that Mulla Ismail was allegedly going against the rules given to him over initiation and expansion of the order, although the unforeseen success of the order was likely what actually convinced Araqi to return. The Noorbakshia order throughout the rest of Araqi's life saw the order attain significant success along with influence in Kashmiri politics. He was able to convert several nobles and other powerful figures to the order.

=== Exile in Baltistan ===
For a brief period when Araqi was banished from Kashmir in 1505 due to political tensions at the court, he along with 50 other disciples sought refuge at Skardu in Baltistan. The local rulers welcomed him and treated him as a royal guest. He would soon return to Kashmir after staying in Baltistan for around 2 months. According to local traditions, Araqi and his followers converted many local Balti to the order. Araqi chose one of his disciples, Haidar Hafiz, to stay in Skardu and continue to lead the order there.

== Death ==
While sources do not give a specific year in which Araqi died, common dates given include 1515 and 1526. He was buried at Zadibal in Srinagar, Jammu and Kashmir. His body was later shifted to Chadoora for unknown reasons, and buried in a dargah (tomb shrine).

== Legacy ==
He is considered by some to be the effective founder of Shia Islam in Ladakh and Gilgit–Baltistan, as well as in the rest of Jammu and Kashmir and its adjoining areas.

== Noorbakshia Order ==
=== Qutb genealogy ===
Noorbakshia genealogy

From Imam Reza (Silsila Zahab):
1. Ma'ruf al-Karkhi	2. Sari al-Saqati	3. Junayd of Baghdad (Silsila Junaidia)	4. Abu Zar Rudbari	5. Abu Ali Katebi
6. Abu Usman Al-Maghribi	7. Abul Qasim Gurgani	8. Abubakr Nassaji	9. Ahmad Ghazali
10. Abu al-Najib Suhrawardi (Silsila e Suhrawardia)	11. Ammar Yaser Bedlisi
12. Najm al-Din Kubra (Kubrawiya Silsila)	13. Ali Ibn lala Ghaznavi	14. Ahmed Zakir Jurjani	15. Abdul Rehman Asfraini	16. 'Ala' al-Dawla Simnani	17. Mahmoud Mazdaqani
18. Mir Sayyid Ali Hamadani(Silsila e Hamdania)	19. Khawaja Ishaq Khatlani
20. Shah Syed Muhammad Noorbaksh (Silsila Nurbakshia)
21. Shah Qasim Faiz Baksh	22. Mir Shams-ud-Din Araqi	23. Mir Daniyal Shaheed	24. Mir Shamsudin Rasheed	25. Mir Hassan Rehnuma
26. Mir Daniyal Dana	27. Mir Abu Saeed Sauda	28. Mir Mukhtar Akhyar	29. Mir Jalal ud Din Muhammad Masoom	30. Mir Najam ud Din Saqib
31. Mir Jalal din Masoom	32. Mir Muhammad Noorani	33. Mir Muhammad Shah Makhdom ul Fuqra	34. Mir Shah Jalal Syed ul Akhyiar	35. Mir Syed Khana elom Fakhr ul Akhiyar
36. Mir Muhammad Akbar Sharaf ul Akhiyar	37. Mir Muhammad Shah Zain ul Akhiyar	38. Mir Syed Aun Ali Shah Aun ul Momineen
39. Mir Syed Muhammad Shah Noorani (current)

== Sources ==
- Bashir, Shahzad (2003). Messianic Hopes and Mystical Visions: The Nūrbakhshīya Between Medieval and Modern Islam. University of South Carolina Press. ISBN 9781570034954
