= Muhammad Nurbakhsh Qahistani =

Iranian Sufi (1392–1464/1465)

Personal life
- Born: Friday 27 Muharram 795 (December 13, 1392 CE)
- Died: 869 AH (1464/1465 CE)
- Era: Medieval
- Region: Asia
- Main interest(s): Aqeedah, Fiqh, Tasawwuf
- Occupation: Islamic scholar

Religious life
- Religion: Islam (Sunni & Shi'i elements)
- Jurisprudence: Sufism
- Creed: The Twelve Imams

Senior posting
- Influenced by: Ali, The Twelve Imams, Sayyid Ali Hamadani, Khuwaja Ishaq Khtlani
- Influenced: Shah Qasim Faiz Baksh, Mir Shams-ud-Din Araqi

Mir Sayyid Muhammad Nurbakhsh Qahistani (1392-1464; Persian: محمد بن عبد الله الموسوئی قہستانی) was a mystic (Sufi) who laid the foundation of the Noorbakshia school of Islam. He authored several books like al Fiqh al-Ahwat (Moderate Islamic Jurisprudence) and Kitab al-Aetiqadia (Book of Faith).

== Life ==
Nurbakhsh's real name was Muhammad bin Abdullah. His father was born in Qain and his grandfather in al-Hasa, whence in some ghazals (lyrics) he styles himself as Lahsavi (one from al-Hasa). His father migrated from Bahrain to Qain in Qahistan, where Nurbakhsh was born in 795 A.H. (1393 C.E.). Thus his full name as appeared in his prose works is Sayyid Muhammad Nurbakhsh Qahistani.

Nurbakhsh became a disciple of Sayyid Ishaq al-Khatlani, himself a disciple of Mir Sayyid Ali Hamadani. Through his writings Nurbakhsh made an attempt to bridge the gap between the orthodox Sunni'ism and Shi'ism and gave an Islamic Fiqh of religious moderation in his book titled Al-Fiqh al-Ahwat (Moderate Islamic Jurisprudence).

His tomb is in Suleqan near Tehran.

== Works ==
Syed Muhammad Nurbakhsh wrote about 150 works in Arabic or Persian.

1. Al-Fiqh Al-Ahwat (Islamic Jurisprudence)
2. Kitab al-Aetiqadia (Book of Faith)
3. Silsila Dhahab (in Arabic and Persian)
4. Risal fi Ilm Firasat or Insan-nama
5. Kashf al-Haqaeeq
6. Risala Maash al-Salikeen
7. Makarim al-Akhlaq
8. Silsila al-Auliya (Arabic)
9. Risala Nooria or Nur al-Haq
10. Risala Miraajia (Persian)
11. Risal al Huda (Arabic)
12. Risala Aqsam-e-Dil (Persian)

== Noorbakshia Order ==
=== Qutb genealogy ===
Noorbakshia genealogy

From Imam Reza (Silsila Zahab):
1. Ma'ruf al-Karkhi	2. Sari al-Saqati	3. Junayd of Baghdad (Silsila Junaidia)	4. Abu Zar Rudbari	5. Abu Ali Katebi
6. Abu Usman Al-Maghribi	7. Abul Qasim Gurgani	8. Abubakr Nassaji	9. Ahmad Ghazali
10. Abu al-Najib Suhrawardi (Silsila e Suhrawardia)	11. Ammar Yaser Bedlisi
12. Najm al-Din Kubra (Kubrawiya Silsila)	13. Ali Ibn lala Ghaznavi	14. Ahmed Zakir Jurjani	15. Abdul Rehman Asfraini	16. 'Ala' al-Dawla Simnani	17. Mahmoud Mazdaqani
18. Mir Sayyid Ali Hamadani(Silsila e Hamdania)	19. Khawaja Ishaq Khatlani
20. Shah Syed Muhammad Noorbaksh (Silsila Nurbakshia)
21. Shah Qasim Faiz Baksh	22. Mir Shams-ud-Din Araqi	23. Mir Daniyal Shaheed	24. Mir Shamsudin Rasheed	25. Mir Hassan Rehnuma
26. Mir Daniyal Dana	27. Mir Abu Saeed Sauda	28. Mir Mukhtar Akhyar	29. Mir Jalal ud Din Muhammad Masoom	30. Mir Najam ud Din Saqib
31. Mir Jalal din Masoom	32. Mir Muhammad Noorani	33. Mir Muhammad Shah Makhdom ul Fuqra	34. Mir Shah Jalal Syed ul Akhyiar	35. Mir Syed Khana elom Fakhr ul Akhiyar
36. Mir Muhammad Akbar Sharaf ul Akhiyar	37. Mir Muhammad Shah Zain ul Akhiyar	38. Mir Syed Aun Ali Shah Aun ul Momineen
39. Mir Syed Muhammad Shah Noorani (current)

== See also ==
- Haji Bektash Veli
