= Chahal Asrar =

Collection of Persian poems attributed to Mir Syed Ali Hamadani

- Author: Mir Syed Ali Hamdani
- Language: Persian

Chahal Asrar (Persian: چهل اسرار, lit. 'Forty Secrets') also spelled Chahal e Asrar, Chahalul Asrar, or Chahlul Asrar is a collection of forty Persian ghazals attributed to Mir Syed Ali Hamadani (1314–1384 CE), a Sufi saint and scholar of the Kubrawiya order, known as Shah-e-Hamadan in Kashmir. Also referred to as "The Forty Secrets," the poems explore themes of divine love and spiritual enlightenment and are recited during religious occasions in Kashmir, particularly Mawlid (the Prophet Muhammad's birthday). The collection is a significant part of Hamadani's legacy, reflecting his role in shaping Kashmir's Islamic and cultural traditions.

== Background ==
Mir Syed Ali Hamadani, a Persian Sufi, visited Kashmir three times (1372, 1379, 1383), contributing to the spread of Islam and Persian arts like shawl-making and calligraphy.

He authored numerous works, including Zakhirat-ul-Muluk (on governance) and Awraad-ul-Fatehah (prayers), with Chahal Asrar being a key poetic contribution.

Likely composed during his travels, the ghazals reflect his Kubrawiya emphasis on mystical devotion.

== Content ==
Chahal Asrar consists of forty ghazals, a form of Persian lyric poetry, exploring Sufi themes such as:

- Divine love and yearning for God.
- Spiritual enlightenment and the quest for divine truth.
- The mystical significance of the number forty, symbolising spiritual trials.

The poems are recited during Maulood celebrations, honoring the Prophet Muhammad, and reflect Hamadani's poetic skill and spiritual insight.

== Significance and legacy ==
Chahal Asrar is integral to Kashmir's Islamic devotional culture, recited during Maulood and Hamadani's annual Urs on the 6th of Zil Haj at shrines like Seer Hamdan and Srinagar.

Its use in religious gatherings, alongside Awraad-ul-Fatehah, underscores its role in Kashmiri Hanafi practices.

Allama Iqbal noted that Hamadani's works, including Chahal Asrar, transformed Kashmir into a "mini Iran" by enriching its cultural landscape.

The text is celebrated for its poetic beauty and spiritual depth, contributing to Hamadani's legacy as a reformer and mystic.

== Availability ==
A digitised manuscript of Chahal Asrar is preserved by the University of Kashmir, accessible through Maktabah Mujaddidiyah and Mohrasharif.

Additional manuscripts may exist in collections like the Raza Library, Rampur, or the Oriental Research Department, Srinagar.

The text is available online via Sufinama, supporting its accessibility to scholars and devotees.

Its recitation in Kashmiri religious gatherings ensures its continued use.

== Scholarly reception ==
Chahal Asrar is referenced in studies of Kashmiri Sufism, with Hamid Naseem Rafiabadi noting its role in devotional practices.

Articles in Milli Gazette and Kashmir Watch highlight its significance during Maulood celebrations.

Compared to Zakhirat-ul-Muluk, which has extensive academic analysis, Chahal Asrar receives less scholarly attention, likely due to its poetic form, but its cultural impact is well-documented.
