= Awraad-ul-Fatehah =

Arabic-language collection of supplicatory prayers and litanies

- Author: Mir Sayyid Ali Hamadani
- Language: Arabic
- Publication date: 14th century

Awraad-ul-Fatehah (Persian: اوراد فتحیه, lit. 'Prayers of Victory') also known as Aurad-e-Fatiha is an Arabic-language collection of supplicatory prayers and litanies attributed to Mir Syed Ali Hamadani (1314–1384 CE), a prominent Sufi saint, scholar, and missionary of the Kubrawiya order. Known as Shah-e-Hamadan in Kashmir, Hamadani composed these prayers to promote spiritual devotion and divine remembrance (dhikr), focusing on the unity of God (tawhid) and His attributes. Recited daily in Kashmiri mosques and Sufi gatherings, the text is a cornerstone of the region’s Islamic devotional practices and a key element of Hamadani's spiritual legacy.

== Background ==
Mir Syed Ali Hamadani, a Persian Sufi, significantly influenced Kashmir’s religious, cultural, and economic landscape during his visits in the 1370s.

He authored numerous works, including Zakhirat-ul-Muluk (on governance) and Risalah Maktubaat (letters), with Awraad-ul-Fatehah being his most widely practiced devotional text.

Composed during his travels in Central and South Asia, the prayers reflect his Kubrawiya emphasis on spiritual discipline and communal worship.

== Content ==
Awraad-ul-Fatehah consists of prayers and litanies, primarily centered on Surah Al-Fatiha (the Quran’s opening chapter) and other supplications.

The affirmation of tawhid and reflection on divine attributes. The spiritual purification through structured dhikr. The accessible guidance for daily worship, suitable for Sufi disciples and lay Muslims.

The text is praised for its intellectual and spiritual depth, blending mystical insights with practical devotion, making it integral to Kashmiri religious life.

== Significance and legacy ==
Awraad-ul-Fatehah is a vital part of Kashmir's Islamic tradition, recited daily in mosques and during Sufi gatherings, alongside practices like Naat Khwani (praise poetry).

Its widespread use distinguishes it from Hamadani's scholarly works, such as Zakhirat-ul-Muluk, and underscores its role in embedding Sufi practices within Kashmiri Islam.

Described as a "gift for the people of Kashmir," it remains a living tradition, celebrated for its spiritual accessibility.

The text is honoured during Hamadani's annual Urs on the 6th of Zil Haj, a major religious event in Kashmir.

Its integration into communal worship reflects Hamadani’s lasting influence, merging Kubrawiya Sufism with local traditions. Scholars like Hamid Naseem Rafiabadi emphasise its role in shaping Kashmiri devotional culture.
