= Ala al-Dawla =

Ala al-Dawla may refer to:

- Ala al-Dawla Bozkurt, Beg of Dulkadir
- Ala al-Dawla Muhammad, Kakuyid emir
- Ala al-Dawla Mirza, Timurid prince
- Ala al-Dawla Simnani, Persian Sufi
