= Khanqah-e-Mualla Noorbakshia Khaplu Bala =

Khanqah in Gilgit-Baltistan, Pakistan

- خانقاہ معلیٰ نوربخشیہ خپلو بالا
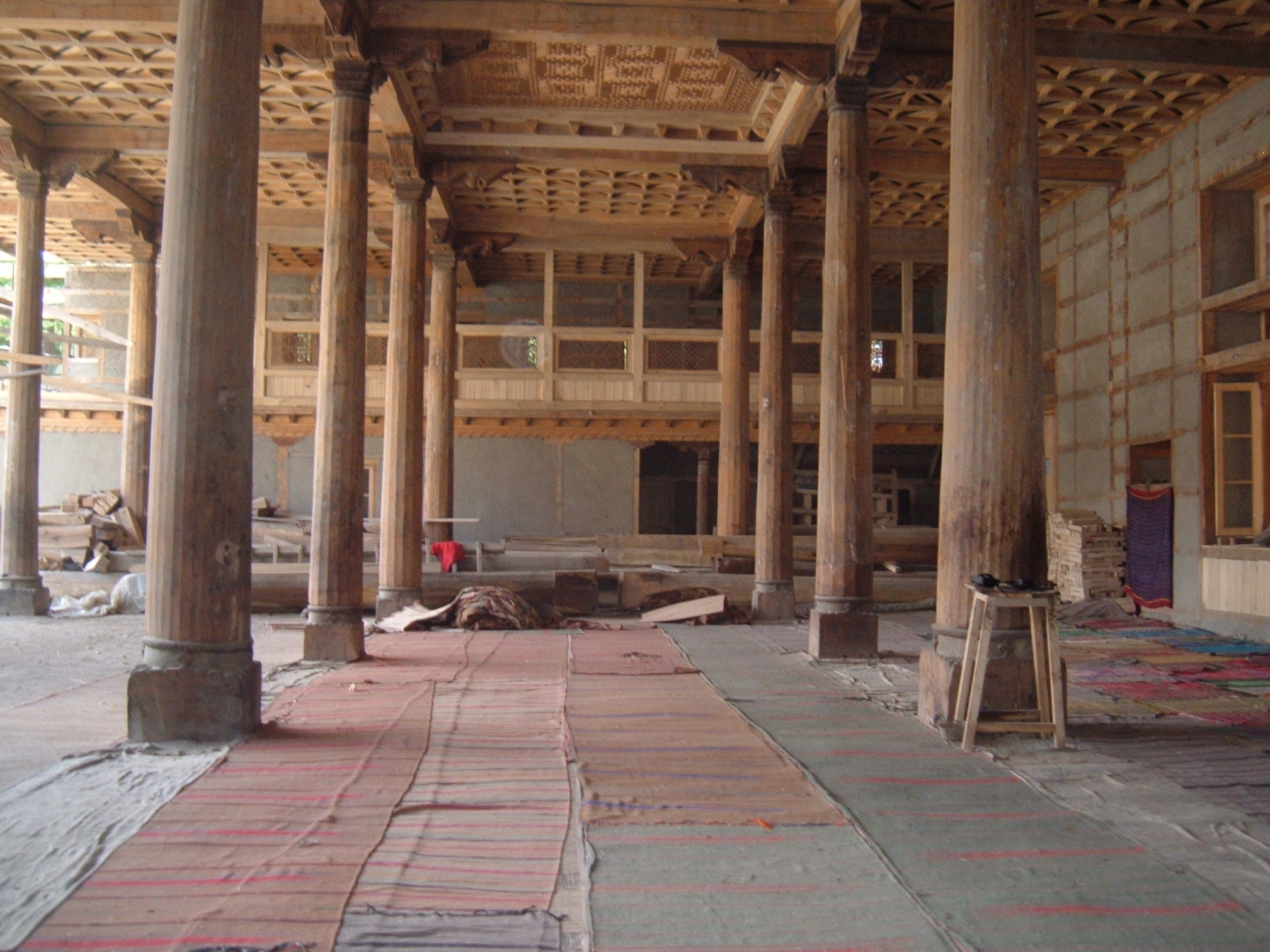

Religion
- Affiliation: Noorbakshia, Islam

Location
- Location: Khaplu Bala, Pakistan
- Interactive map of Khanqah-e-Mualla Noorbakshia Khaplu Bala
- Coordinates: 35.15703°N 76.34522°E

Architecture
- Type: Mosque
- Style: Tibetan, Iranian, Mughal
- Established: 1370
- Construction cost: 35 million
- Capacity: 3000 within the adjoining grounds areas,

Khanqah-e-Mualla Noorbakshia Khaplu Bala (Urdu: خانقاہ معلیٰ نوربخشیہ خپلو بالا) is a religious monument and largest Khanqah built by mud and wood in the region of Gilgit-Baltistan, northern Pakistan. It is located in Khaplu and was built by Noorbakhshi Sufi mystic Mir Mukhtar Akhyar. It was started in 1109 and completed in 1124. As of 2025, repairs and reconstruction is ongoing. There is a space of six thousand Namazi. Syed Mubarek Ali is the current Imam and Khateeb. Khanqaah is a Persian word made up of two words - khan and qaah, khan means living area and qaah means spiritual training. Khanqaah means the spiritual training center, a Sufi master of the Nurbakshi Order around the 14th century. It is one of the oldest mosques in the Baltistan region, and is one of the areas most famous for its landmarks and a major tourist attraction.

== See also ==
- Khaplu Palace
- Chaqchan Mosque
- Khaplu
