= Risalah Maktubaat =

Collection of letters by Mir Syed Ali Hamadani

- Letters of Mir Saiyid Ali Hamadani An Annotated Edition with English Translation and Historical Analysis.
- Author: Mir Syed Ali Hamdani
- Language: Farsi

Risalah Maktubaat (Persian: رساله مکتوبات, lit. ‘Treatise of Letters’) is a collection of Persian-language letters written by Mir Syed Ali Hamadani (1314–1384 CE), a prominent Sufi scholar, missionary, and saint of the Kubrawiya order. Known as Shah-e-Hamadan in Kashmir, Hamadani addressed these letters to disciples, rulers, and followers, offering guidance on spiritual practices, moral conduct, and governance. The work is significant for its insights into Hamadani’s role as a spiritual leader and diplomat in 14th-century Kashmir.

== Background ==
Mir Syed Ali Hamadani was a Persian Sufi who played a key role in spreading Islam in Kashmir, influencing its religious and cultural landscape.

He authored numerous works, including Zakhirat-ul-Muluk and Awrad-e-Fathiya, with Risalah Maktubaat being a collection of his correspondence.

The letters were written during his travels in Central and South Asia, likely in the late 14th century.

== Content ==
Risalah Maktubaat comprises letters addressing:

• Sufi spiritual practices and devotion.

• Advice to rulers, such as Kashmir’s Sultan Qutbu'd-Din Shah, on just governance.

• Guidance for disciples on piety and community relations.

The letters reflect Hamadani’s Kubrawiya Sufi teachings and his diplomatic efforts, including mediating peace between Qutbuddin and Firuz Shah Tughlaq, Sultan of Delhi.

== Significance and legacy ==
Risalah Maktubaat is valued as a primary source for Hamadani’s interactions with contemporaries and his contributions to Kashmir’s Islamization.

It complements his other works, like Zakhirat-ul-Muluk, by documenting his practical leadership.
