= Zakhirat-ul-Muluk =

Persian-language treatise written by Mir Syed Ali Hamadani

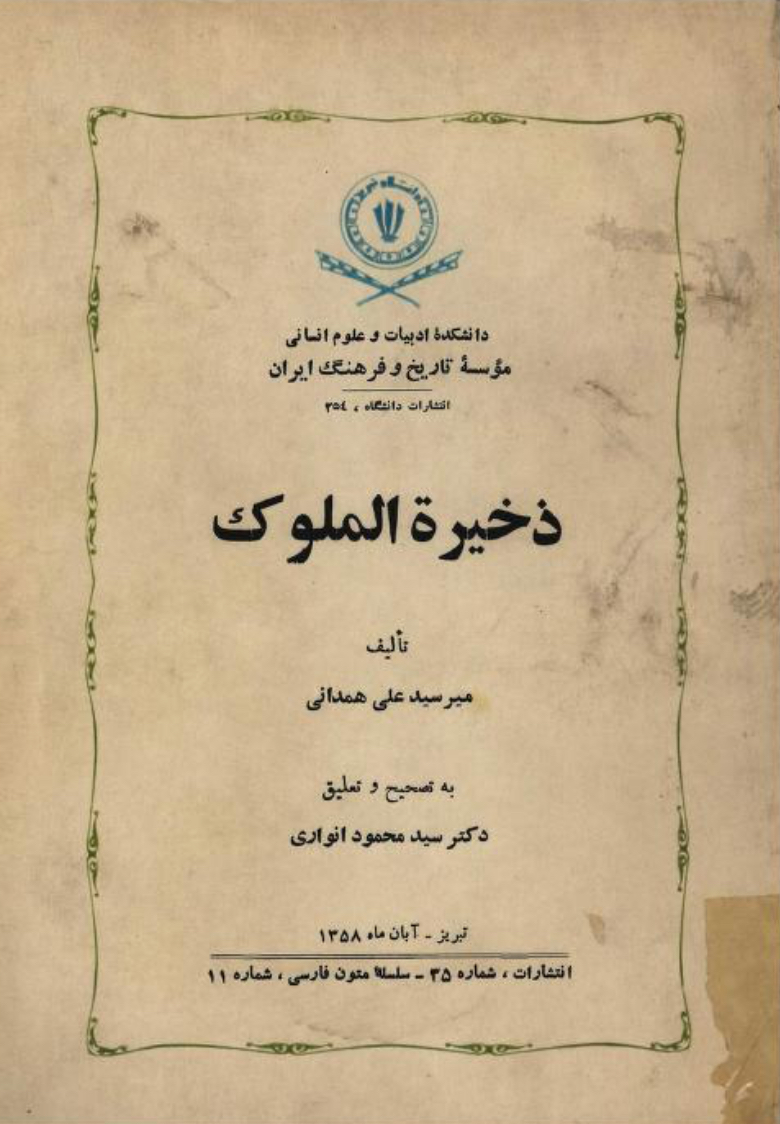
- Author: Mir Syed Ali Hamdani
- Language: Farsi

Zakhirat-ul-Muluk (Persian: ذخیرة الملوک, lit. ‘Treasure of the Kings’) is a Persian-language treatise on political ethics, governance, and Islamic spirituality written by the 14th-century Sufi scholar and missionary Mir Syed Ali Hamadani (1314–1384 CE). The work, one of Hamadani’s most significant contributions, outlines principles of just governance, moral conduct, and spiritual duties, drawing on Islamic teachings and historical examples. It has been influential in shaping socio-cultural and religious thought, particularly in Kashmir, where Hamadani is revered as a key figure in the spread of Islam.

It has been a significant work for scholars during the early pre-Mughal period in India.

== Background ==
Mir Sayyid Ali Hamadani, also known as Shah-e-Hamadan or Amir-e-Kabir, was a Persian Sufi of the Kubrawiya order, born in Hamadan, Iran.

He traveled extensively across Central and South Asia, preaching Islam and establishing Sufi networks.

Hamadani is credited with authoring numerous works, with Zakhirat-ul-Muluk being among his most prominent, alongside texts like Awrad-e-Fathiya and Chahal Asrar.

Written in Persian, Zakhirat-ul-Muluk reflects Hamadani’s synthesis of Islamic political philosophy and Sufi ethics, addressing rulers, scholars, and the general populace.

The text was composed during Hamadani’s travels, likely in the late 14th century, and its manuscript is preserved in institutions such as the Raza Library, Rampur.

== Content ==
The book explores themes of politics, social relationships, and governance, offering guidance for rulers and those in positions of authority.

It is structured in ten chapters, covering a range of topics related to governance, ethics, and spirituality:

1. Principles of faith and belief

2. Duties of individuals in society

3. Moral virtues and their cultivation

4. Rights and responsibilities within families

5. Rules and ethics of governance

6. Spiritual guidance for rulers and subjects

7. Lawful conduct in personal and public life

8. Importance of gratitude

9. Practice of patience

10. Value of humility

The text emphasises just governance, advocating for rulers to embody simplicity, justice, and benevolence, drawing on examples from the Prophet Muhammad, the Rashidun Caliphs, and earlier prophets such as Moses and Joseph.

Hamadani contrasts these ideals with corrupt practices, urging leaders to prioritise public welfare.

The book also promotes tolerance and forbearance, presenting these as Quranic virtues essential for social harmony.

== Manuscripts and editions ==
Manuscripts of Zakhirat-ul-Muluk are preserved in several institutions, including the Raza Library, Rampur, and the Oriental Research Department, Srinagar.

The text has been published in various editions, with some sections available online, such as through Google Books.

Its academic study is supported by translations and critical editions, making it accessible to researchers and scholars.

== Scholarly reception ==
Scholars have praised Zakhirat-ul-Muluk for its comprehensive approach to governance and ethics. Mohammad Behnamfar and Mohammad Bakhshaee-zadeh highlight its advocacy for tolerance and forbearance, rooted in Islamic principles.

The text’s relevance to modern governance and interfaith relations has been noted in academic discussions.

However, some studies note that the text’s citations are limited in certain research platforms, suggesting a need for further global engagement.
