= Noorbakhshia Islam =

Sufi mystic order in Islam

Sofia Noorbakhshia or Sufia Nūrbakhshia (Balti: སོཕིཡ ནུར་བཀྵིཡ; Urdu: نوربخشیہصوفیہ) is a Sufi order primarily present in the Baltistan region of Pakistan & with fewer followers in Ladakh / Kargil in India. Along with its sufi identity, Sufia Nurbakhshia is also a proper school of Islamic jurisprudence developed under the teaching of Persian Sufi master Muhammad Nurbakhsh (d.1465).

As a school of jurisprudence, it drives its basic islamic tenets from a short treatise Al Aitaqadiya written by Nurbakhsh and as a legal source it follows Fiqh ul Ahwat.

Its jurisprudence, places significant emphasis on the concept of Muslim unity and discourgages takfeeriyat of muslims over issues of creed and practices. Removal of Bid'ah is also a goal as mentioned by Nurbaksh in the introduction of Fiqh ul Ahwat.

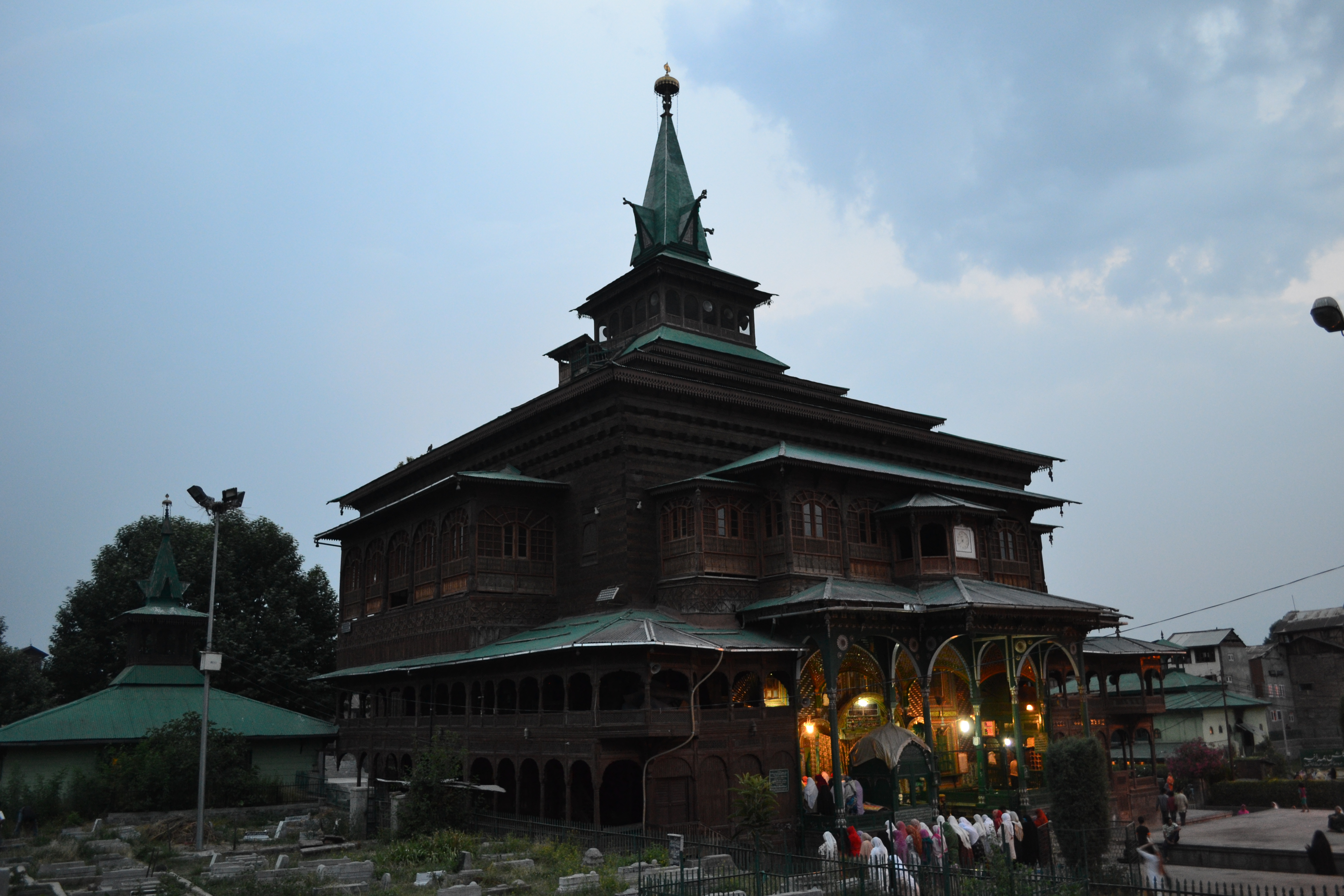
Khanqah Shah Hamdan in Srinagar, Kashmir, was a Noorbakshia center for centuries.

The Sufia Nurbakhshia tradition, as sufi tariqa, is an offshoot of Kubruwiya order. The lineage known as the Silsila-e-Zahab Sufia Nurbakhshia, or the Golden Chain. This spiritual lineage claims to trace its origins back to Prophet Muhammad PBUH through the Imam-e Haqiqi real Imam (Imam Ali a.s) via Ali al-Rida. Ma'ruf al-Karkhi was the first Qutb of Nurbakhsi Tariqa.

In Nurbakhsi Sufism, Ali is Adam ul Awliya, (first of all saint) and Al Mahdi as Khatam ul Awliya. Nurbakhshia stands out among Sufi orders within Islam for its foundational principles deeply rooted in the teachings of the twelve imams, or Fourteen Infallibles. The followers of this lineage are known as Sufia Nurbakhshia and Sufia Imamia Nurbakhshia. Sufi chains with fewer followers also exist in Iran. However, their presence in Kashmir, Kurdistan, Turkey, Afghanistan and Tajikistan have been replaced by other sufi traditions completely- mostly by Naqshbandis and mainstream twelver shias.

== Doctrine ==
The primary doctrinal sources of Noorbakhshi teachings are encapsulated within three key things: "Al-Fiqh al-Ahwat" and "Kitab al-Aitiqadia," given by Muhammad Nurbakhsh Qahistani, and "Dawat-e-Noorbakhshia".

== History ==
In its country of origin, Iran, the Noorbakhshia underwent a transition towards Shia Islam, particularly Twelver Shi'ism, several decades after the Safavid dynasty officially established Twelver Shi'ism as the state religion in 1501. A similar transformation occurred in Kashmir, either during the lifetime of Shams ud-Din Iraqi, who died in 1527, or in the subsequent decades, coinciding with the brief reign of the Chak dynasty. The order began declining in the mid-16th century in Kashmir and persecution by Sunni authorities led to its eventual demise. Eventually, the order was assimilated into mainstream Twelver Shi'a Islam.

In regions such as Baltistan and Purig in the Kargil district, the Nurbakhshia persisted as a distinct sect with its own doctrinal framework, blending elements of both Shi'ism and Sunni Islam although much of its teaching, law and doctrine is derived from Imami Shia doctrine.

Muhammad Nurbakhsh Qahistani, the Sufi master of the 15th century, has received relatively little attention from researchers despite his significant influence. Although Nurbakhsh had numerous scholar-disciples, such as Shaikh Asiri Lahiji, none of them undertook substantial efforts to document Nurbakhsh's biography or to preserve his teachings.

Nurbakhshis believe that the practices are not an assemblage of his personal views but were originally conceived by him from Muhammad through the masters of the spiritual chain. They state that anyone who questions this connection is invited to travel on the long road through the history of mysticism and to compare it with that of Nurbakhsh's teachings.

== In Baltistan and Ladakh ==
The Noorbakshia order persists in Baltistan and Kargil in Ladakh as a distinct sect with its own unique doctrinal blend encompassing elements of Shi'a and Sunni Islam. While the order formerly had numerous adherents in the region, its prominence has waned in recent times, after the deaths of notable figures such as Mir Danial Shahīd, although the specific timeframe of these events requires further specification. Significant pockets of adherents continue to exist, particularly with many residing in Baltistan, and in villages scattered throughout Kargil and the Nubra Valley in Ladakh.

== See also ==
- Nurbakhshi Order The spirtual lineage.
- Mir Sayyid Ali Hamadani
- Mir Shams-ud-Din Araqi
