= Ahmad Ghazali =

Muslim theologian and writer

Ahmad Ghazālī
- احمد غزالی
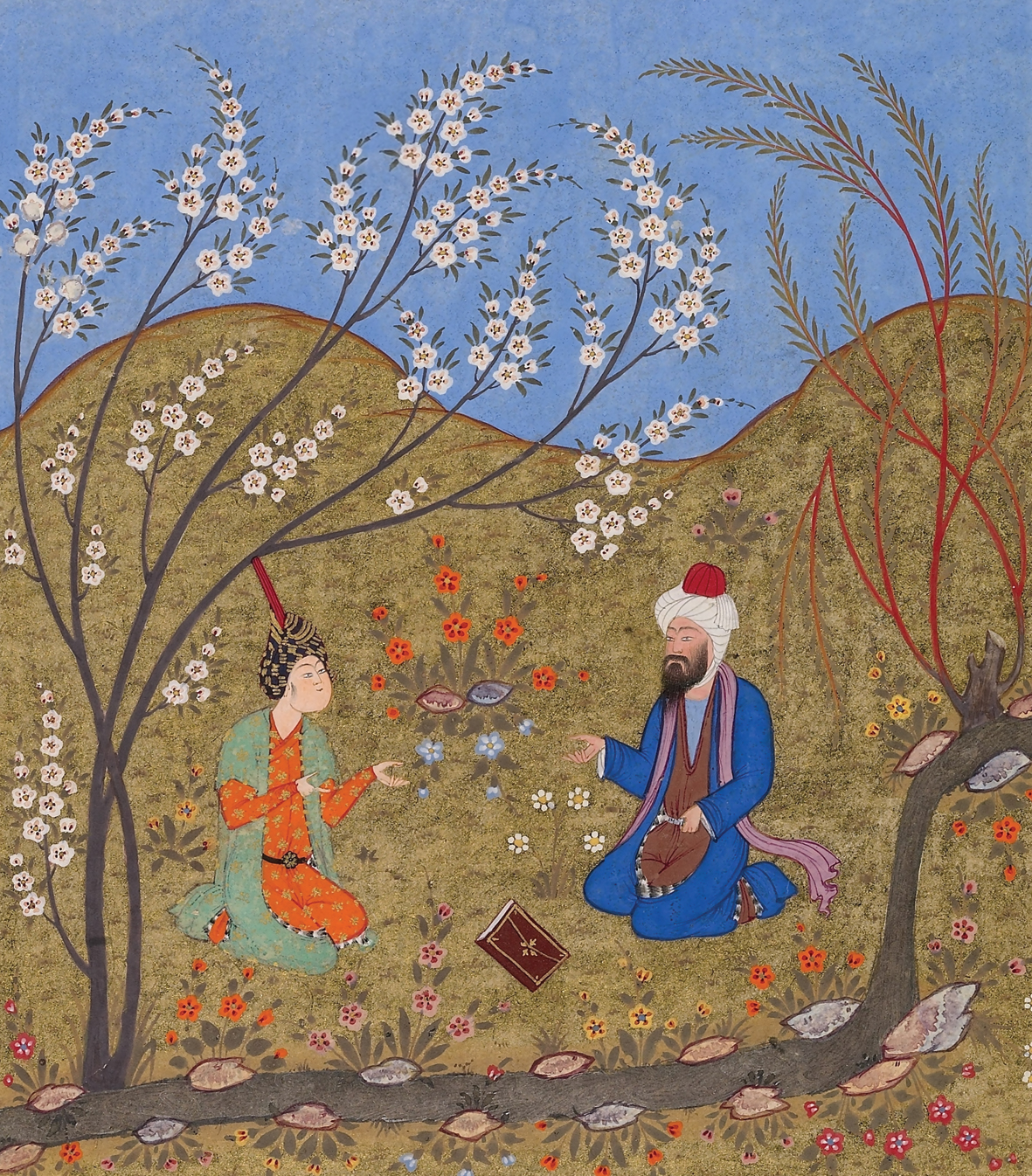
- Ahmad Ghazālī pictured with a disciple in a 1552 miniature.
- Born: Majd al-Dīn Abū al-Fotuḥ Aḥmad Ghazālī; 1061 near Tūs, Khorasan
- Died: 1123; Qazvin, Iran
- Known for: Persian Sufi mystic, writer, preacher, and head of the Nizamiyya of Baghdad
- Notable work: Sawāneḥ, Risālat al-ṭayr, Al-tajrīd fī kalimat al-tawḥīd
- Relatives: Abū Ḥāmid Muḥammad al-Ghazālī (brother)
- Scientific career

Ahmad Ghazālī (Persian: احمد غزالی; full name Majd al-Dīn Abū al-Fotuḥ Aḥmad Ghazālī) was a Sunni Muslim Sufi mystic, writer, preacher, and the head of the Nizamiyya of Baghdad (c. 1061–1123 or 1126). He is best known in the history of Islam for his ideas on love and the meaning of love, expressed primarily in the book Sawāneḥ.

== Life ==
The younger brother of the better known theologian, jurist, and Sufi, Abū Ḥāmid Muḥammad al-Ghazālī, Ahmad Ghazālī was born in a village near Tūs, in Khorasan. Here he was educated primarily in jurisprudence. He turned to Sufism while still young, becoming the pupil first of Abu Bakr Nassaj Tusi (died 1094) and then of Abu Ali Farmadi (died 1084). He was advanced in Sufism by 1095, and his brother Abū Ḥāmid asked him to teach in his place in the Nizamiyya of Baghdad and assume responsibility during his planned absence.

Ahmad Ghazālī’s thought, centered as it was on the idea of love, left a profound mark on the development of Persian Islamic mystical literature, especially poetry celebrating love. Many of the topoi (maẓāmīn) used by later poets such as ʿAṭṭār, Saʿdī, ʿIrāqī, and Ḥāfeẓ, to name but a few, can be traced to his works, particularly the Sawāneḥ.

Among his predecessors, he was influenced most strongly by Ḥallāj, and he made of his idea of essential love the basis of his own thought. His belief that all created beauty is an emanation of divine beauty was likewise Hallajian or neo-Platonic in origin. Since God is both absolute beauty and the lover of all phenomenal beauty, Ahmad Ghazālī maintained, to adore any object of beauty is to participate in a divine act of love. Hence the practice of naẓar-bāzī or šāhed-bāzī, gazing on young and beautiful faces, a practice for which he became notorious.

== Students of Ahmad Ghazali ==
Ahmad Ghazālī travelled extensively in the capacities of both Sufi master and a popular preacher. He visited Nishapur, Maragheh, Hamadan and Isfahan. He initiated and trained eminent masters of Sufism including Ayn al-Quzat Hamadani, Sheikh Adi ibn Musafir, Abu al-Najib al-Suhrawardi, The latter was the founder of the Suhrawardiyya Order and its derivatives such as the Kubrawiyya, Mevlevi and Ni'matullāhī orders.

He died in Qazvin in 1123 or 1126 and is buried there.

== Works ==
- Sawāneḥ, a little book written around 1114 and comprising some 77 short chapters. It was innovative in form, for at a time when Persian Sufi authors used only prose, Ghazālī had recourse to verse in order to illustrate in metaphorical fashion the themes he expounded more technically in the prose sections of his work.
- Risālat al-ṭayr (or al-ṭuyūr) (Epistle of the Birds): In this work Ghazālī employs the metaphor of a bird and its journey to speak of the spiritual path to illumination in God. This work set a precedent for the Conference of the Birds by Attar of Nishapur.
- Al-tajrīd fī kalimat al-tawḥīd, a theological and mystical interpretation of the basic testimony of Islam, Lā ilāha illā Allāh, which reflects his adherence to the Ashʿarite school of theology.
- Risālah-yi ʿAyniyyah (Treatise for ʿAyn al-Quḍāt), a Persian treatise written in response to a letter from his most celebrated disciple, Ayn al-Quzat Hamadani, addressing several aspects of the spiritual life.
- Mukātabāt (Letters), a collection of letters, most believed to have been written to Ayn al-Quzat Hamadani; Lumbard includes them among the Persian works "definitely of his hand," though he notes that their authenticity is not fully established.
- Majālis Aḥmad al-Ghazālī (The Sessions of Ahmad Ghazālī), a collection of his public preaching sessions delivered in Baghdad and recorded by Saʿīd b. Fāris al-Labbānī, about whom no biographical information survives; of the original eighty-three sessions, only about twenty are known to survive.

== Works of disputed attribution ==
Several additional works have circulated under Ahmad Ghazālī's name but are considered by scholars, notably Joseph E. B. Lumbard, to be misattributed or of doubtful authenticity.

- Bawāriq al-ilmāʾ fī l-radd ‘alā man yuḥarrim al-samāʾ, a treatise on the Sufi Sama ritual and the compatibility of music and Islam, traditionally attributed to Ahmad Ghazālī. This attribution has since been disputed; Joseph E. B. Lumbard identifies it as "foremost among" several works misattributed to Ahmad Ghazālī, noting that an edited and translated edition of the text was the first Arabic work attributed to him to reach Euro-American academia, and that the resulting misunderstandings were perpetuated in later scholarship. Lumbard reaches the same conclusion in his earlier monograph on Ahmad Ghazālī, stating plainly that the attribution "is erroneous."
- Baḥr al-maḥabba fī asrār al-mawadda, a Sufi commentary on Sūrat Yūsuf (Koran 12), traditionally attributed to Ahmad Ghazālī; Lumbard considers this attribution dubious on stylistic grounds, noting that the earliest of its fourteen known manuscripts dates from roughly four centuries after Ahmad Ghazālī's death.
- Lubāb al-Iḥyāʾ, an abridgment of his brother's Iḥyāʾ ʿulūm al-dīn, attributed to Ahmad by some biographers but credited to Abū Ḥāmid al-Ghazālī himself in most surviving manuscripts.
- Sirr al-asrār fī kashf al-anwār (The Secret of Secrets Concerning the Unveiling of Lights), sometimes catalogued under Ahmad Ghazālī's name; Lumbard argues it is instead the work of a different, similarly named author, Aḥmad b. Muḥammad al-Ṭūsī, based on stylistic and terminological differences from Ahmad Ghazālī's authenticated writings.
