= Rudbari =

Persian sufi saint of the 8th century

Saint Rudbari
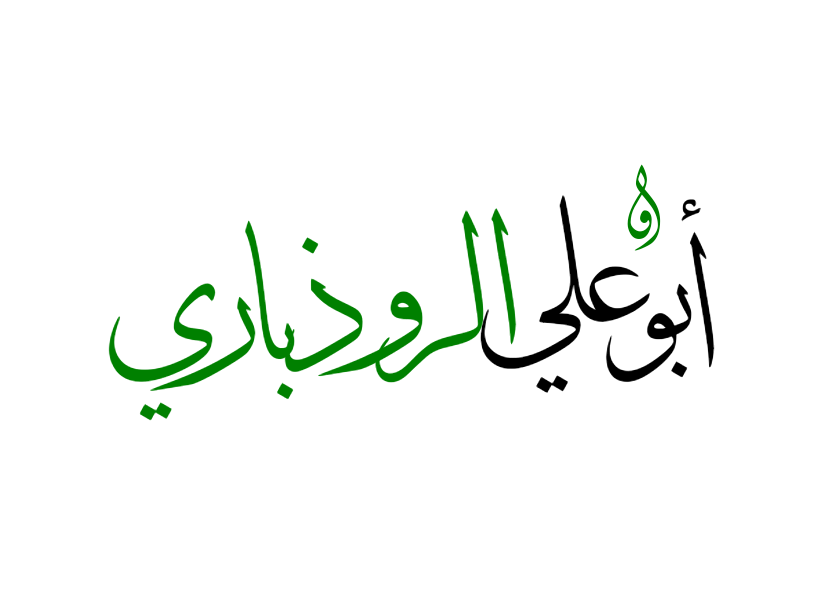

Mystic
- Born: c. 850-70 C.E.
- Died: c. 933-40 C.E. Baghdad (?)
- Venerated in: Islam
- Influences: Muhammad, Junayd Baghdadi

Abu Ali al-Rudbari or Abuzer Rudbari (Persian: ابو علی رودباری), known also as Rudbari, was a famous early Persian sufi saint of the 9th century. He claimed descent from the Sassanid king Anushiravan and was a disciple of Junayd Baghdadi.

Rudbari's statements are recounted in many sayings of the Islamic world. One of his most famous sayings is:

No prison confines more closely than the society of those whose outlook is contrary to one's own.

== See also ==
- Ma'ruf al-Karkhi
- Junayd of Baghdad
- Sari al-Saqati
- Najm al-Din Kubra
- Shaikh Asiri Lahiji
- Seyyed Qutb al-Din Mohammad Neyrizi
- Abu al-Najib Suhrawardi
- 'Ala' al-Dawla Simnani
