= Abu al-Qasim Gurgani =

Shaykh Abul Qasim Gurgani (990/380–1058/450 AH) (Persian:ابو القاسم گرگانی) was an Iranian Sufi of Kubruwia Sufi tariqah as well as other Sufi orders. Shaykh Gurgani authored a book titled "Fusūl al-Tarīqah wa Fusūl al-Haqīqah". His grave is located in a small village, three kilometers south of Torbat Ḥeydarīyeh in Iran.

== Early life ==
He was born in Gorgan in 380 AH. He received the spiritual Knowledge of Sufism from the master of Abu Usman Almaghribi.

== Companions ==
His spiritual successor was Abubakr Nisaj and some other disciples were.

- Abu Ali al-Farmadi
- Khwaja Ali Hallaj
- Abubakr Abdullah Tusi
