= Mir Sayyid Ali Hamadani =

Sufi kubrawiyyah scholar and Alim (c. 1312–1384)

Shah e Hamadan; Amir e Kabir; Mir Sayyid Ali Hamadani
- میر سید علی همدانی
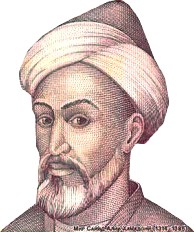
- Hamadani as depicted on a Tajikistani banknote
- Title: Shāh-e-Hamadān

Personal life
- Born: c. 1314 CE (710 AH) Hamadan, Ilkhanate (present-day Iran)
- Died: 1384 (aged 71–72) (786 AH) Hazara, Swat
- Resting place: Kulob, Timurid Empire (present-day Tajikistan)
- Children: Mir Muhammad Hamadani & Mah e Khurasan (daughter) Khwaja Ishaq (son in law)
- Parent: Syed Shahab Ud Din (father)
- Notable idea(s): Zakhirat-ul-Muluk, Risalah Maktubaat, Awraad-ul-Fatehah, Chahal Asrar
- Other names: Amīr-i Kabīr; Ali Sani

Religious life
- Religion: Islam
- Denomination: Sunni
- Jurisprudence: Shafi’i
- Tariqa: Kubrawiya
- Creed: Ashari

Muslim leader
- Predecessor: Sheikh Mahmood Muzdaqani
- Successor: Khwaja Ishaq Khatlani

Mir Sayyid Ali Hamadani (Persian: میر سید علی همدانی; c. 1314–1384 CE) was a Persian Sufi saint, scholar, poet and missionary of the Shafi’i Kubrawiya order, widely revered for spreading Islam in Kashmir and Central Asia. He played a pivotal role in shaping the region's religious, cultural, and economic landscape through his teachings, writings, and introduction of Persian handicrafts. Hamadani authored numerous treatises on Sufism and Islamic theology, including Dhakhirat al-Muluk and Risala-i Nuriyya, and established religious institutions across Persia, Central Asia, and South Asia. His legacy endures through the Khanqah-e-Mu'alla shrine in Srinagar and his lasting influence on Kashmiri culture.

Hamadani was also addressed honorifically throughout his life as the Shāh-e-Hamadān ("King of Hamadan"), Amīr-i Kabīr ("the Great Commander"), and Ali Sani ("second Ali").

== Early life ==
Mir Sayyid Ali Hamadani was born around 1314 in Hamadan, Persia (modern-day Iran), into a Sayyid family claiming descent from the Prophet Muhammad through his cousin Ali ibn Abi Talib.

His father, Sayyid Shihabuddin, was a local governor, and his family was steeped in Islamic scholarship and Sufism. Hamadani studied under prominent Sufi masters of the Kubrawi order, including Sharafuddin Mahmud Mazdaqani, mastering theology, mysticism, and Persian poetry.

His early education emphasized the Kubrawi focus on spiritual purification and divine remembrance (dhikr), which shaped his later missionary work.

Hamadani spent his early years under the tutelage of Ala ad-Daula Simnani, a famous Kubrawiya saint from Semnan, Iran, the first of the Sufis to criticize the teachings of the School of Ibn Arabi in general, and the concept of "oneness of being" (waḥdat al-wujūd) in particular. As a successor of Simnānī, Hamadānī was an heir to this debate, and Asrār al-Nuqṭah must be viewed in this context.

== Travels ==
Sayyid Ali Hamadani travelled widely and preached Islam in Afghanistan, Uzbekistan, China, Syria, Kashmir, and Turkestan.

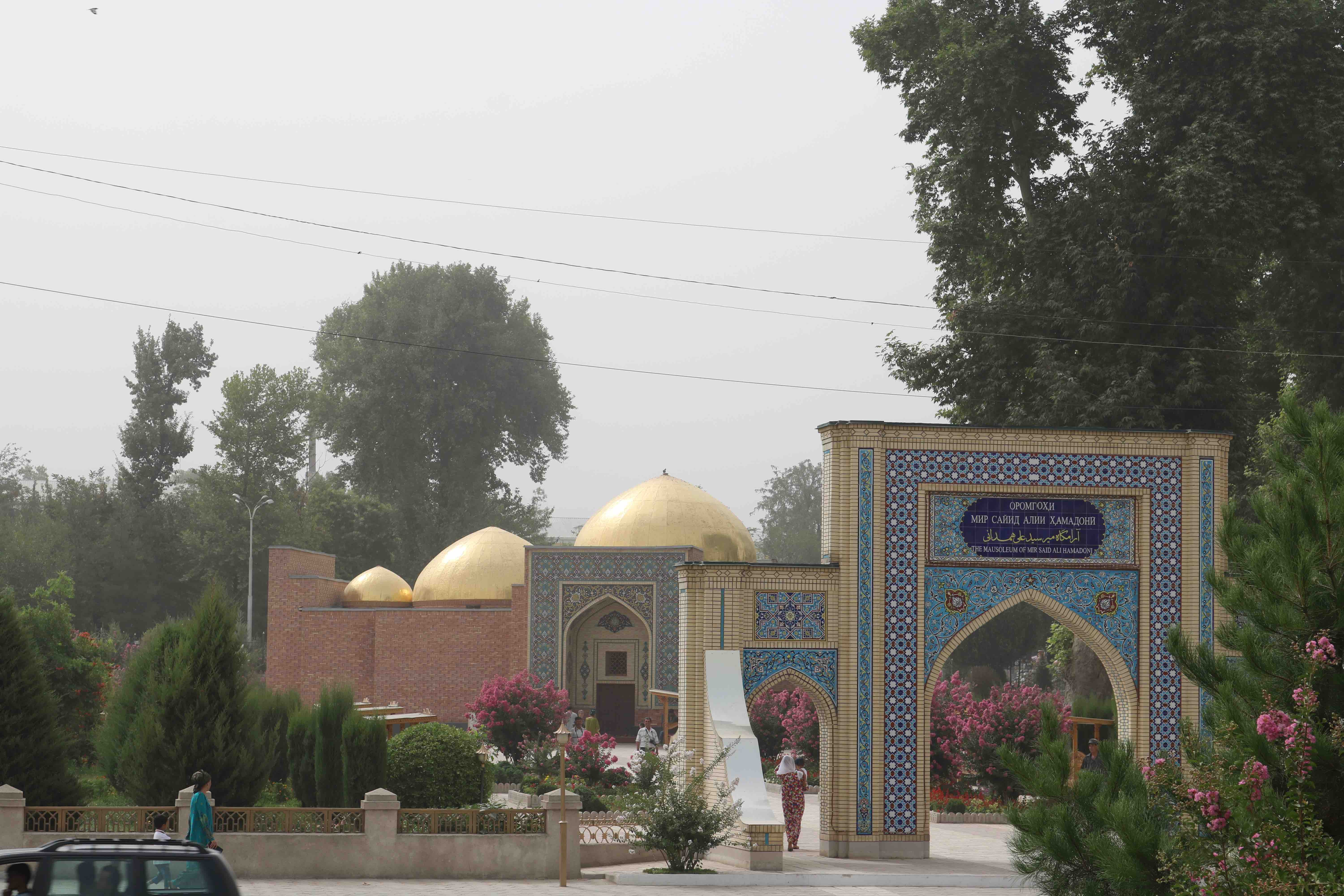
Mausoleum of Mir Sayyid Ali Hamadani in Kulab, Tajikistan

The third visit of Sayyid Ali was caused by the third invasion of Persia by Timur in 1383, when he conquered Iraq and decided to oust the Alid Sayyids of Hamadan, who, until his time, had played an important part in local affairs. Sayyid Ali, therefore, left Hamadan with 700 Sayyids and set out towards Kashmir, where he expected to be safe from the wrath of Timur. He had already sent two of his followers, Syed Taj ad-din Hamadani and Mir Syed Hasan Semnani Hamadani, to take stock of the situation. Shib ad-Din became a follower of Mir Syed Hasan Semnani, and so Hamadani was welcomed in Kashmir by the king and his heir apparent Qutbu'd-Din Shah. At that time, the Kashmiri ruler, Qutub ad-Din Shah, was at war with Firuz Shah Tughlaq, the Sultan of Delhi, but Hamadani brokered a peace. Hamdani stayed in Kashmir for six months. After Sharaf-ad-Din Abdul Rehman Bulbul Shah, Hamadani was the second important Muslim to visit Kashmir. Hamadani went to Mecca and then returned to Kashmir in 1379/80 CE, during the reign of Qutub ad-Din, and spent a year spreading Islam in Kashmir before returning to Turkestan via Ladakh in 1381/82 CE. He returned to Kashmir for the third time in 1383/84 CE to stay for a longer period, but had to return earlier owing to illness. Hamadani died on his way back to Central Asia at a site close to the present-day town of Mansehra in North-West Pakistan. His body was carried by his disciples to Kulab, Tajikistan, where his shrine is located.

== Death and legacy ==
Hamadani died in 1384, with historical accounts differing on the location—either in the Kunar Valley (modern-day Afghanistan) or Swat (modern-day Pakistan), on his way from Srinagar to Mecca, and was buried in Kulob, Khatlan, Tajikistan, where his shrine remains a site of veneration.

In Kashmir, he is revered as “Shah-e-Hamadan,” (The King of Hamadan) and the Khanqah-e-Moula in Srinagar attracts thousands of pilgrims annually.

Hamadani's teachings influenced subsequent Sufi orders in Kashmir, including the Rishi order, and his writings continue to be studied in Islamic scholarship.

His introduction of handicrafts laid the foundation for Kashmir's textile industry, and his emphasis on ethical governance inspired rulers in the region. Modern scholars view him as a key figure in the Islamisation of Kashmir and Central Asia, blending spiritual and cultural contributions.

== Influence ==
The historical Eidgah Srinagar is also known as Eidgah Shah-i-Hamdan. Hamadani is regarded as having brought various crafts and industries from Iran into Kashmir, notably carpet weaving; it is said that he brought 700 Sayyids with him to the country.

The growth of the textile industry in Kashmir increased its demand for fine wool, which in turn meant that Kashmiri Muslim groups settled in Ladakh, bringing with them skills such as minting and literary writing.

Hamadani started organized efforts to convert Kashmir to Islam. His book on politics, governance and social behaviour, called the Zakhirat ul-Muluk, includes twenty rules for non-Muslims:

1. They should not construct a new temple, church, shrine, or house for idols in a country which is governed by a Muslim ruler.
2. When such places of worship fall to ruin, they should not be re-built.
3. Muslim travellers should not be allowed to lodge in churches and temples.
4. They should desist from providing food to a Muslim for three days, should one have to stay in their house.
5. They should not act as spies in a Muslim country and should not provide space to spies in their houses.
6. If their relatives wish to convert to Islam, they should not stop them.
7. They should respect Muslims.
8. If they are sitting at a gathering, they should give up their place to any Muslim who arrives.
9. They should not dress like Muslims.
10. They should not take Muslim names.
11. They should not ride horses with saddles and reins.
12. They should not travel with swords or bows.
13. They should not wear rings with precious stones or signets.
14. They should not sell wine nor offer it publicly.
15. They should not stop wearing the clothing that they wore before the arrival of Islam, so that a distinction is maintained between them and Muslims.
16. They should not display traditions and rites of non-Muslims among Muslims.
17. They should not build houses in Muslim neighbourhoods.
18. They should not carry their dead near the burial places of Muslims.
19. They should not raise their voices when mourning their dead.
20. They should not buy Muslim slaves.

Hamadani further dictated that if the non-Muslims violated any of these conditions then they forfeited their rights to life and property and those may be rightfully taken away by Muslims as though they were captured infidels. These efforts laid the groundwork for the large-scale forced conversion of Kashmiri Hindus to Islam under Sikandar Shah Miri (1389-1413). (Note: The zunnars of all these dead men weighed three ass-loads, when taken for incineration.)

== Writings ==
Hamadani was a prolific author, producing over 70 treatises and books on Sufism, Islamic theology, and ethics.

Syed Abdur-Rehman Hamdani, in his book Salar-e-Ajjam, lists 68 books and 23 pamphlets by Sayyid Ali Hamadani.

One manuscript (Raza Library, Rampur, 764; copied 929/1523) contains eleven works ascribed to Hamadani (whose silsila runs to Naw'i Khabushani; the manuscript contains two documents associated with him).

His writings combined Kubrawi mysticism with practical guidance, influencing both scholars and laypeople in the regions he visited.

His most notable works include:

- Awraad-ul-Fatehah
- Chahal Asrar
- Zakhirat-ul-Muluk
- Risalah Maktubaat
- Risalah Nooriyah
- Dur Mu’rifati Surat wa Sirat-i-Insaan
- Dur Haqaa’iki Tawbah
- Hallil Nususi allal Fusus
- Sharhi Qasidah Khamriyah Fariziyah
- Risalatul Istalahaat
- ilmul Qiyafah or Risalah-i qiyafah
- Dah Qa’idah
- Kitabul Mawdah Fil Qurba
- Kitabus Sab’ina Fi Fadha’il Amiril Mu’minin
- Arba’ina Amiriyah
- Rawdhtul

== Bibliography ==
- John Renard 2005: Historical Dictionary of Sufism (Historical Dictionaries of Religions, Philosophies and Movements, 58), ISBN 0810853426
