= Hadith of the Golden Chain =

Hadith narrated by the eighth Shia Imam

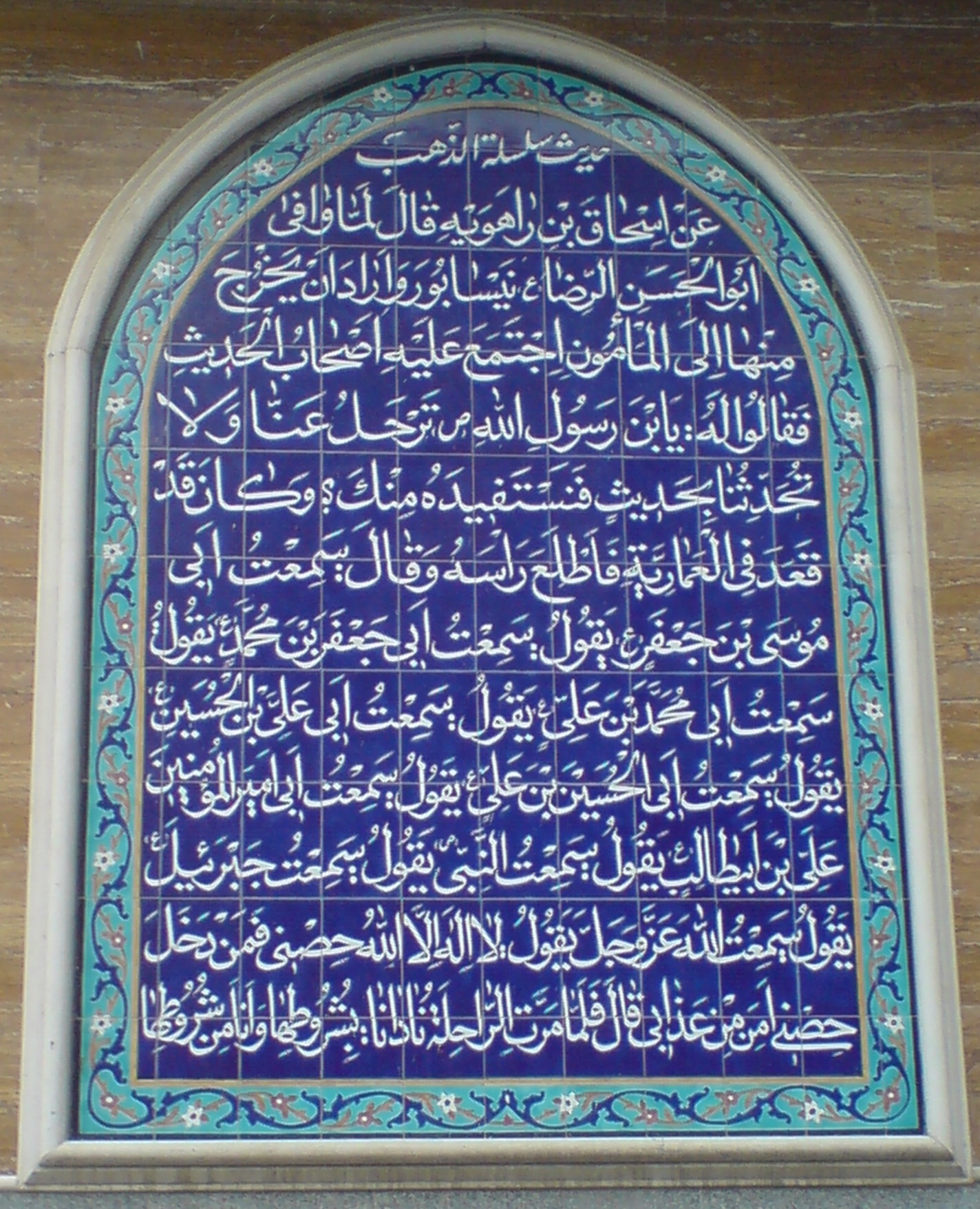
The Hadith of the Golden Chain on tiles on a wall in Nishapur, the city where Imam al-Rida recited the hadith during his journey from Medina to Khorasan. Thirty thousand scholars and locals were present and wrote down the hadith.

The Hadith of the Golden Chain or Hadith Silsilat al-Dhahab (Arabic: حدیث سلسلة الذهب) is a hadith narrated from Ali al-Rida, the eighth of the Twelve Imams. It is particularly renowned for its chain of transmission through members of the Prophet Muhammad's family and for its emphasis on Tawhid (the oneness of God). Al-Rida recited the hadith in Nishapur during his journey from Medina to Khorasan. The narration was written down and transmitted by thirty thousands scholars and locals present at the gathering. The addition concerning the “conditions” is especially significant in Twelver Shi'ism, connecting monotheism with acceptance of divinely appointed religious authority and Imamate. For this reason, the hadith has become one of the most important traditions associated with Imam al-Rida and the doctrine of Imamate.

The hadith is not exclusive to Shia sources. Multiple versions of it are also found in Sunni hadiths, although its wording and interpretation differ between sources. Consequently, the Hadith of the Golden Chain is significant not only in Shia Islam, but also in Sunni Islam. It is valued as among the most truthful and accurate of all hadiths in Shia Islam. The hadith is important because it states that, on the one hand, monotheism leads believers to "God's fortress," a place of protection, and on the other hand, acceptance of the Imamate is a fundamental condition for entering this fortress.

== Background ==
When thousands of people gathered to welcome Imam Reza's arrival at the entrance to Nishapur, scholars requested him to narrate a hadith. According to some Shia scholars, ten, twenty, or thirty thousands wrote down and transmitted this hadith at the gathering. Only fifty narrations are available today. The chain of the narrators of the hadith reaches the Prophet of Islam through Ahl al-Bayt, hence called Hadith of Golden Chain. Several Important hadith collections quoted it as Al-Tawhid, Ma'ani al-Akhbar, the Uyoun Akhbar Al-Ridha of ibn Babawayh and the Al-Amali of Shaykh Tusi. The hadith is also narrated in Sunni hadith books. Regarding the implications of the hadith, there are two extreme opinions by Sunni scholars; While some of them discrediting the hadith by implying that the Sunni books lack it, some others hold that all Sunni scholars accepted it.

== Hadith ==
The hadith is narrated by Imam Ali al-Rida while entering Nishapur, Khorasan. Many historians have recorded it. Old documents quote the hadith with small different wordings. When Imam Reza was entering the city a large crowd had gathered outside the city and some of the great scholars such as Muhammad ibn al-Rafi, Ahmad ibn al-Harith, Ishaq ibn al-Rahuwayh, and Yahya ibn al-Yahya were accompanying him. Twenty (or ten or thirty) thousands have reported the event. The narrations mentioning twenty thousands reporters are more famous and reliable. Many Sunni laymen and scholars participated in welcoming the Imam. Scholars asked Ali al-Rida to narrate hadith for them. So al-Rida announced the Hadith of the Golden Chain.

=== Shia narrations ===
Shia hadith collections such as Al-Tawhid, Maani Al-Akhbar, and Uyoun Akhbar Al-Ridha of Shaykh al-Saduq and Al-Amali of Shaykh Tusi has narrated the hadith:

- Ahsan al-Maqaal:
  I have heard my father Musa ibn Ja’far (al-Kazim) saying that he heard from his father Ja’far ibn Muhammad (al-Sadiq) saying that he heard his father Muhammad ibn Ali (al-Baqir) saying that he heard from his father Ali ibn al-Husain (al-Sajjad) saying that he heard from his father Husayn ibn Ali saying that he heard from his father Ali ibn Abi Talib saying that he heard from the Holy Prophet saying that he heard from Gabriel saying that Allah told him: The kalimatu Laa ilaaha illallah (the saying that there's no god but Allah) is my fortress. Whoever chants it, enters my fortress; and whoever enters my fortress shall be safe from my punishment’”. The Imam then paused for a moment and continued, “There are few conditions entitling entrance to the fortressو and I am one of its conditions
- Ma'ani al-Akhbar, Oyoun Akhbar Al-Ridha, Al-Tawhid:
  Ishaq Ibn Rahwayh said: When Abu al-Hasan al-Ridha arrived at Nishapur and decided to leave the city to join Ma'mun, the hadith scholars gathered around him and said: "O son of Allah's apostle, are you leaving us without pronouncing a beneficial hadith for us?" He (Ali al-Rida) while sitting in palanquin let his out head and said: "I heard from my father Musa ibn Jafar (al-Kazim) who said he heard from his father Jafar ibn Mohammad (al-Sadiq) who said he heard from his father Mohammad ibn Ali (al-Baqir) who said he heard from Ali ibn Husayn (al-Sajjad) who said he heard from his father Husayn ibn Ali who said he heard from his father, Amir al Momenin Ali ibn abi Talib who said he heard from Allah's apostle, peace be upon him and his household, who said he heard from Gabriel who said he heard that Allah said: "There is no god but Allah is my fortress whoever enters my fortress shall be safe from my punishment" and when the convoy moved he (Ali al-Ridha) shouted: "There are few conditions and I am one of its conditions". (Note: حدثنا محمدبن موسى بن المتوکل ـ رضى الله عنه ـ قال حدثنا ابوالحسین محمدبن جعفر الاسدى، قال حدثنا محمدبن الحسین الصولى (الصوفى)، قال حدثنا یوسف بن عقیل عن اسحق بن راهویة، قال لما وفى ابوالحسن الرضا علیه السلام نیسابور واراد أن یخرج منها الى المأمون، اجتمع علیه اصحاب الحدیث فقالوا له: «یا ابن رسول الله ترحل عنا ولا تحدّثنا بحدیث فنستفیده منک؟» وکان قد قعد فى العماریة فاطلع رأسه وقال: «سمعت ابى موسى بن جعفر یقول سمعت ابى جعفربن محمد یقول سمعت ابى محمدبن على یقول سمعت ابى على بن الحسین یقول سمعت ابى الحسین بن على بن ابى طالب یقول سمعت ابى امیرالمؤمنین على بن ابى طالب یقول سمعت رسول الله صلى الله علیه وآله وسلم یقول سمعت جبرئیل یقول سمعت الله جل جلاله یقول: لااله الاالله حصنى فمن دخل حصنى امن من عذابى». قال فلمّا مرّت الراحلة نادانا «بشروطها وانا من شروطها».)

=== Sunni narrations ===
Many Sunni scholars have narrated this event. (Note: Yahya ibn Yahya, Ahmad ibn Harb Neshabouri, Abu al-Salt Abd al-Salam ibn Heravi, al-Hakim Nishapuri, Abu Nu`aym al-Isfahani, Abu Ḥamid Muḥammad ibn Muḥammad al-Ghazali, Ibn al-Jawzi Hanbali, Sibt ibn al-Jawzi, Al-Suyuti, Muttaqi al-Hindi, Qazi Behjat Afandi.) Two of the important narrations are the "Fortress narration" and the "Faith narration".

==== The Fortress narration ====
There exists two different viewpoints among Sunni scholars regarding the Fortress Narration. Some of them mention Abu al-Salt Abd al-Salam ibn Heravi as the only narrator of this hadith and have disqualified him as a narrator, and consequently disregard the hadith. On the other hand, some of the Sunni scholars regard Abu al-Salt as highly credible and therefore confirm the hadith, and some others even suggested healing powers for the hadith.

Ali ibn Musa al-Rida, peace be upon him, said: "My father Musa al-Kazim told me from his father Jafar al-Sadiq, from his father Muhammad al-Baqir, from his father Ali Zayn al-Abidin, from his father Husayn, the martyr of Karbala, from his father Ali ibn Abi Talib, peace be upon him, who said: I heard from, the apple of my eye, Allah's apostle peace be upon him and his household, who heard from Gabriel saying that Allah said:"There is no god but Allah is my fortress, whoever chants this enters my fortress, and whoever enters my fortress shall be safe from my punishment." " (Note: قال علیّ بن موسی الرضا علیه السلام، حدّثنی ابی موسی الکاظم، عن ابیه جعفرالصادق، عن أبیه محمد الباقر، عن ابیه علیّ زین العابدین، عن ابیه الحسین الشهید بکربلاء، عن ابیه علی بن ابی طالب علیهم السلام، قال: حدّثنی حبیبی و قرّه عینی رسول الله صلی الله علیه و آله و سلم، قال: حدّثنی جبرائیل، قال: سمعت رب العزّه سبحانه و تعالی یقول: کلمه لا إله إلا الله حِصْنی فمن قالها دَخَل حِصْنی و من دخل حصنی امِن من عذابی)

==== The part specifying 'condition' ====
Although the last part of the hadith ("There are few conditions and I am one of its conditions") is omitted in most Sunni hadith books, some of the Sunni scholars such as Khaje Parsa Hanafi and Qazi Bahjat Affandi Shafi'i have mentioned this part in their narration as well.

== Al-Silsilah al-Dhahab in Hadith terminology ==
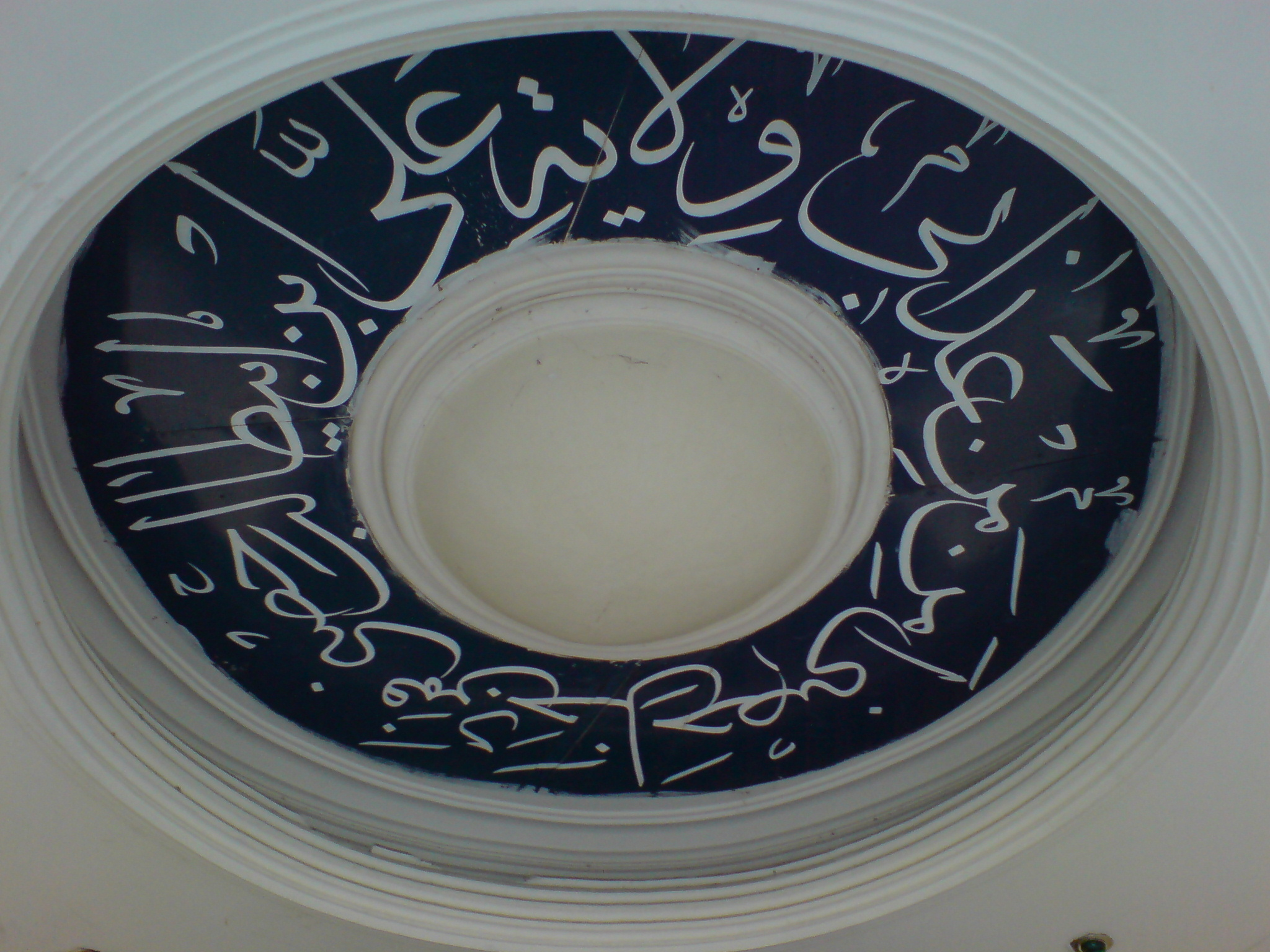
A mural of al-Silsilah al-Dhahab hadith on the ceiling of Al-Ghadir library located in Neyshabour

Hadith terminology categorize the hadith into several sections. The following are some important topics that are discussed about Al-Silsilah al-Dhahab. Al-Silsilah al-Dhahab is a Hadith Qudsi, i.e., the word of God, but differs from the Quran. Gabriel transmitted the hadith from God to Prophet. Al-Silsilah al-Dhahab is Mutawatir. Shia and Sunni scholars have narrated the hadith by different expressions with authenticity. The hadith is Musalsal, meaning that it's a word of God and is conveyed from the prophet through Ahl al-Bayt to Ali al-Rida. In other word, narrators of the hadith are Prophet and Ahl al-Bayt. According to Shia view, they are infallible and immune from error in practical matters, in inviting people to the religion and in perceiving the realm of cognition. Because of that, the hadith is called Golden Chain.

== See also ==
- Al-Risala al-Dhahabiyya
- Al-Sahifat al-Ridha
- Hadith of the two weighty things
- Hadith of the pond of Khumm
