= Abu al-Najib Suhrawardi =

Persian Sunni Muslim scholar (1097–1168)

Abu al-Najib Abd al-Qahir al-Suhrawardi (Persian: ابوالنجیب عبد القاهر سهروردی) (1097–1168) was a Sunni Persian Sufi who was born in Sohrevard, near Zanjan, and founded the Suhrawardiyya Sufi order. He studied Islamic law in Baghdad, later becoming professor of Shafi'ite law at the Nizamiyya of Baghdad.

He then later on set up a retreat by the river Tigris, where he gathered disciples, which eventually came to be the Sufi order of Suhrawardiyya which included Ahmed Al-Ghazali, the younger brother of Abu Hamid Al-Ghazali. His paternal nephew Shahab al-Din Abu Hafs Umar Suhrawardi expanded the order. His name is also sometimes transcribed as Diya al-din Abu 'n-Najib as-Suhrawardi.

== See also ==
- Suhrawardiyya
