= Suhrawardiyya =

Sufi order founded by Abu al-Najib Suhrawardi

The Suhrawardi order (Arabic: سهروردية, Persian: سهروردیه) is a Sufi order founded by Abu ’l-Nad̲j̲īb Suhrawardī (died 1168). Lacking a centralised structure, it eventually divided into various branches. The order was especially prominent in India. The ideology of the Suhrawardi order was inspired by Junayd of Baghdad (d. 910), a Persian scholar and mystic from Baghdad.

Under the Ilkhanate (1256–1335), the Suhrawardi was one of the three leading Sufi orders and was based in western Iran. The order had its own khanqahs (Sufi lodges), which helped them spread their influence throughout Persianate society. The order included prominent members such as the Akbari mystics Abd al-Razzaq Kāshānī (died 1329), Sa'id al-Din Farghani (died 1300), and the Persian poet Saadi Shirazi (died 1292).

Today, most orders have dissolved in Middle Eastern countries such as Syria. However, the order is still active in Iraq, where it recruits new members.

The presence of the Suhrawardi order in India was established by three disciples of S̲h̲ihāb al-Dīn Abū Ḥafṣ ʿUmar Suhrawardī, who established branches in Delhi, Bengal, and Multan. The most successful proselytizer of the order was Bahāʾ al-Dīn Zakariyyāʾ Multānī. One of his disciples, Sayyid D̲j̲alāl Buk̲h̲ārī aka D̲j̲alāl Surk̲h̲ founded the Jalali branch of the order. Bahāʾ al-Dīn’s most notable disciple was the poet Fak̲h̲r al-Dīn Ibrāhīm ʿIrāḳī. Bahāʾ al-Dīn's descendants remained in Multān, such as his grandson Rukn al-Dīn Abu ’l-Fatḥ. The line ended with the execution of Rukn al-Dīn's successor, Hūd, by the sultān due to embezzlement charges. In Uččh, D̲j̲alāl al-Dīn Buk̲h̲ārī “Mak̲h̲dūm-i D̲j̲ahāniyān", became the most notable figure of the Multān branch, who was also a member of the Chishti order and was notably puritanical. The descendants and disciples of the Mak̲h̲dūm spread to Kalpī, Gujarat, and notably Delhi. The greatest presence of the Suhrawardi order in India was in Kashmir. The king of Kashmir, Rinchana, was converted to Islam by Sayyid S̲h̲araf al-Dīn aka Bulbul Shah.

The Suhrawardi order had a strong relationship and exerted influence over Indian rulers and governments such the Delhi Sultanate, Gujarat Sultanate, and Mughal Empire. The Suhrawardīs supported the forced conversion of Hindus and Buddhists to Islam, and its converts were mainly upper caste. Suhrawardiyya spirituality focused on dhikr and Ramadan fasting and followed classical Ṣūfī doctrine.

== Sources ==
- Babaie, Sussan (2019). Iran After the Mongols. Bloomsbury Publishing. ISBN 978-1788315289.
- Sobieroj, F. (1997). "Suhrawardiyya". In Bosworth, C. E.; van Donzel, E.; Heinrichs, W. P. & Lecomte, G. (eds.). The Encyclopaedia of Islam, Second Edition. Volume IX: San–Sze. Leiden: E. J. Brill. pp. 784–786. ISBN 978-90-04-10422-8.
- Feuillebois, Ève (2018). "ʿIzz al-Dīn Kāshānī". In Fleet, Kate; Krämer, Gudrun; Matringe, Denis; Nawas, John; Rowson, Everett (eds.). Encyclopaedia of Islam (3rd ed.). Brill Online. ISSN 1873-9830.
