= 'Ala' al-Dawla Simnani =

Persian Sufi

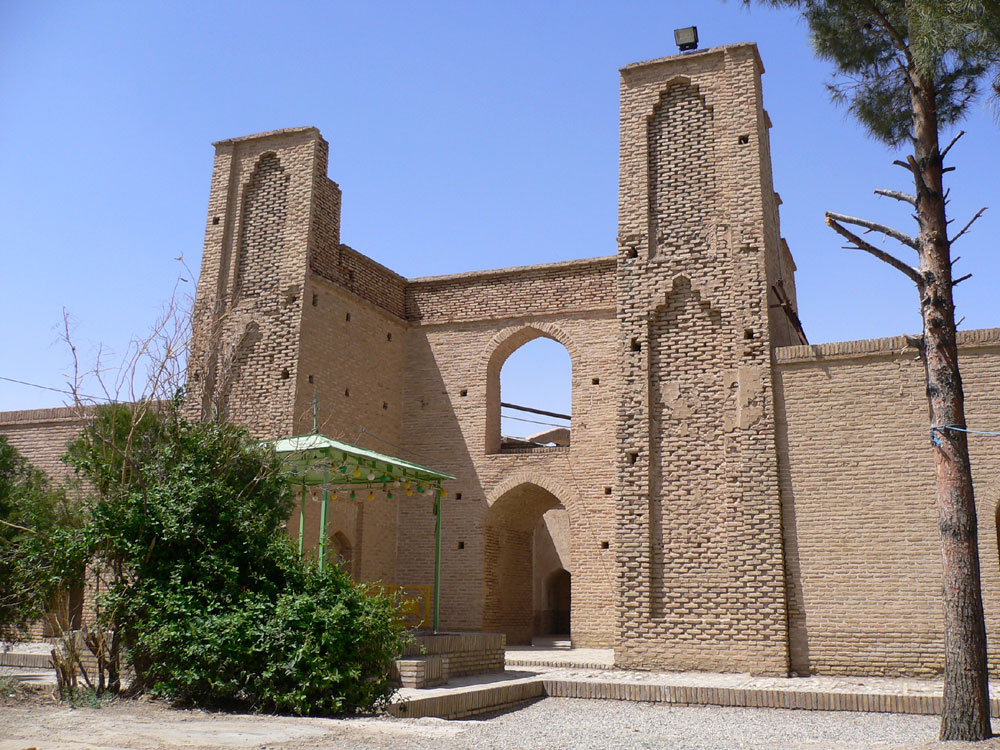
Mausoleum of 'Ala' al-Dawla Simnani in Sorkheh, Iran

'Ala' al-Dawla Simnani (Persian: علاءالدوله سمنانی; November 1261 – 6 March 1336) was a Persian Sūfī of the Kubrāwī order, a writer and a teacher of Sufism. He was born in Semnan, Iran. He studied the tradition of Sufism from Nur al-Din Isfarayini. He also wrote many books on Sufism and Islam. Among his students were great Islamic Preacher Mir Sayyid Ali Hamadani and Ashraf Jahangir Semnani

There was disagreement in those days among ulema and Sufis about various cultural issues, most notably the distinction of Persianate Ajami Islam that was more widespread than the more puritanical Arabized forms. Some proponents of Arabized Islam were furious at Sufi elements that blended elements of Hinduism and deviated from the most strict interpretations of Shari'a. Simnani was a central figure in these debates as the intellectual wellspring of Central Asian mysticism, contrasted with the views of Ibn Arabi, who decried the Sufi philosophies.
