= Abu Uthman al-Maghribi =

Egyptian Sufi scholar of the Kubruwi Order

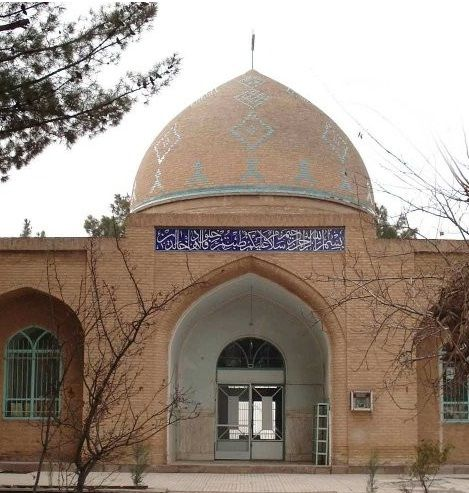
Abū 'Uthmān al-Maghrībī's Mausoleum

Abū 'Uthmān Sa'īd Bin Salām Al-Maghrībī (Persian: ابوعثمانمغربی) was an Egyptian Sufi scholar of the Kubruwi Order. He was instructed in Sufism by Abū 'Alī al-Katib. He was the teacher of famous Asharite scholars, such as Al-Hakim al-Nishapuri. He died in 983 (373 AH) and was buried in Neshabur, Iran. He would have been born in 857, so he would have lived to 130 years old.
