= Kubrawiya =

Sufi mystic order in Sunni Islam

The Kubrawiya order (Arabic: سلسلة کبرویة) or Kubrawi order, also known as Kubrawi Hamadani, is a Sufi order. The Kubrawiya order is named after its 13th-century founder Najm al-Din Kubra, who lived in Konye-Urgench (present day Turkmenistan) under the Khwarazmian dynasty. In 1221, the Mongols captured Konye-Urgench and killed much of its population, including Sheikh Najmuddin Kubra.

The Kubrawiya order places emphasis on the universality of its approach. It is popular in Bangladesh, Mauritius, eastern India, and some areas of Pakistan.

== Branches ==
Mir Sayyid Ali Hamadani was a missionary, scholar, and saint of the Kubrawiyyah, who—starting in the 14th century—helped the order to expand into parts of South Asia, China, and Central Asia (especially among nomads).

In Iran, the Kubrawiya order was split into branches after Khwaja Ishaq Khatlani succeeded the founder. Eventually, differences arose between two claimants to the succession, and between their respective supporters: one group supported Mir Sayyid Muhammad Nurbakhsh Qahistani, who lived in Qaen, and thus they were called the Noorbakshia or Nurbakshia; the other group instead supported Syed Abdullah Barzish Abadi, who was based in Mashhad.

The present Noorbakshia are found in areas such as Baltistan and western Ladakh (Kargil); the supporters of Barzish Abadi initially spread mainly within Khorasan, though they later spread to other countries as well.

== Notable Kubrawiya ==
- Najm al-Dīn Rāzī Dāya (1177–1256)
- Saʿd al-Dīn al-Ḥamuwayī (1190–1260)
- Sayf al-Dīn Bākharzī (1190–1261)
- Emīr Sulṭān (1368–1429)
