= Shah Mir–Lohara War =

War in 14th century Kashmir

Date	1338–1339
Location	Kashmir Valley (now in Jammu and Kashmir, India)
Result	Shah Mir victory
Territorial changes	Lohara Dynasty replaced by Shah Mir dynasty in Kashmir

Belligerents
Shah Mir dynasty	Lohara dynasty

Commanders and leaders
Shamsu'd-Din Shah Mir; Jamshid Shah Miri; Alau'd-Din Shah Miri	Kota Rani; Bhatta Bhikshana

The Shah Mir–Lohara War (Kashmiri: شاہ میر–لوہارا جنگ; Shah meer–Lohara Jang), also known as Kashmir Civil War (1338–1339), was a military conflict in the Kashmir Valley (now in Indian Administered Jammu and Kashmir) between the royal forces of the ruling Hindu Lohara dynasty, led by Kota Rani, against the rebellious Muslim Shah Mir dynasty, led by former courtier Shah Mir. It resulted in the overthrowing of the Loharas and the revival of the Kashmir Sultanate.

== Background ==
With the decline of the Hindu rule, a Buddhist prince from Ladakh, Lhachen Rinchan, entered the service of the Kashmiri commander-in-chief Ramachandra. At the start of 1320, a Mongol invader Zulju, along with his army, invaded Kashmir. King Suhadeva fled the country after putting up a valiant fight and suffering a great deal of havoc, Zulju sacked and left the country. Rinchan, after secretly assassinating Ramachandra, won the favour of the majority of the nobles and ascended the throne as Rinchan Shah. He also married Suhadeva's widow, Kota Rani.

Rinchan converted to Islam after the teachings of saint Bulbul Shah and took the title of Sadr'ud-Din Shah. He also appointed a trader from Swat, Shah Mir, his close associate, and a courtier. Rinchan ruled until 1323 when he died after sustaining an injury on his head in a civil war while his son, Haidar, was given in the care of Shah Mir. Lohara rule was initiated again when Suhadeva's brother Udyanadeva was installed on the throne on the orders of Kota Rani. Even though Udayanadeva ruled as a king, the real power was wielded by Kota Rani herself.

== War ==
In 1338, Udayanadeva died, and Kota Rani ascended the throne while appointing Bhatta Bhikshana as her Prime Minister ignoring Shah Mir. She also moved the capital from Srinagar to Andarkot. This angered Shah Mir as he considered himself as the top contender for the post of the Prime Minister and raised a revolt against her. Through a conspiracy, he assassinated Bhatta Bhikshana and threatened the Queen that he'll send his army to Andarkot if she didn't agree to marry him and share power. Kota Rani declined and prepared to face Shah Mir's forces. Shah Mir sent his forces and defeated the Royal army at the outskirts of Andarkot.

The majority of her chiefs and troops deserted her and joined Shah Mir. Kota Rani, seeing no other way to contend with Shah Mir's army, surrendered and agreed to marry him. Although the marriage was formally solemnized, Shah Mir didn't trust Kota Rani, nor did she. Citations needed most probably present in Kalhana's Rajatarangini Shah Mir tried marrying Kota Rani after killing her sons then she offered her intestines and committed suicide .

== See also ==
- History of Kashmir
