= 14th century =

One hundred years, from 1301 to 1400

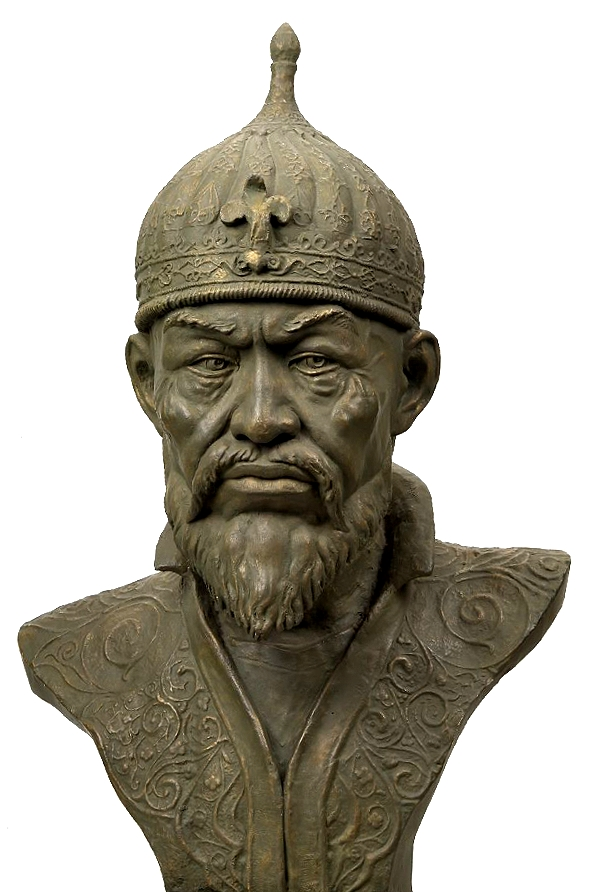
Timur, the founder of the Timurid Empire

The 14th century lasted from 1 January 1301 (represented by the Roman numerals MCCCI) to 31 December 1400 (MCD). It is estimated that the century witnessed the death of more than 45 million lives from political and natural disasters in both Europe and the Mongol Empire. West Africa experienced economic growth and prosperity.

In Europe, the Black Death claimed 25 million lives – wiping out one third of the European population – while the Kingdom of England and the Kingdom of France fought in the protracted Hundred Years' War after the death of King Charles IV of France led to a claim to the French throne by King Edward III of England. This period is considered the height of chivalry and marks the beginning of strong separate identities for both England and France as well as the foundation of the Italian Renaissance and the Ottoman Empire.

In Asia, Tamerlane (Timur), established the Timurid Empire, history's third largest empire to have been ever established by a single conqueror. Scholars estimate that Timur's military campaigns caused the deaths of 17 million people, amounting to about 5% of the world population at the time. Synchronously, the Timurid Renaissance emerged. In the Arab world, historian and political scientist Ibn Khaldun and explorer Ibn Battuta made significant contributions. In India, the Bengal Sultanate separated from the Delhi Sultanate, a major trading nation in the world. The sultanate was described by the Europeans as the richest country to trade with. The Mongol court was driven out of China and retreated to Mongolia, the Ilkhanate collapsed, the Chaghatayid dissolved and broke into two parts, and the Golden Horde lost its position as a great power in Eastern Europe.

In Africa, the wealthy Mali Empire, a huge producer of gold, reached its territorial and economic height under the reign of Mansa Musa I of Mali, the wealthiest individual of medieval times, and perhaps the wealthiest ever.

In the Americas, the Mexica founded the city of Tenochtitlan, while the Mississippian mound city of Cahokia was abandoned.

== Events ==
=== 1301–1309 ===
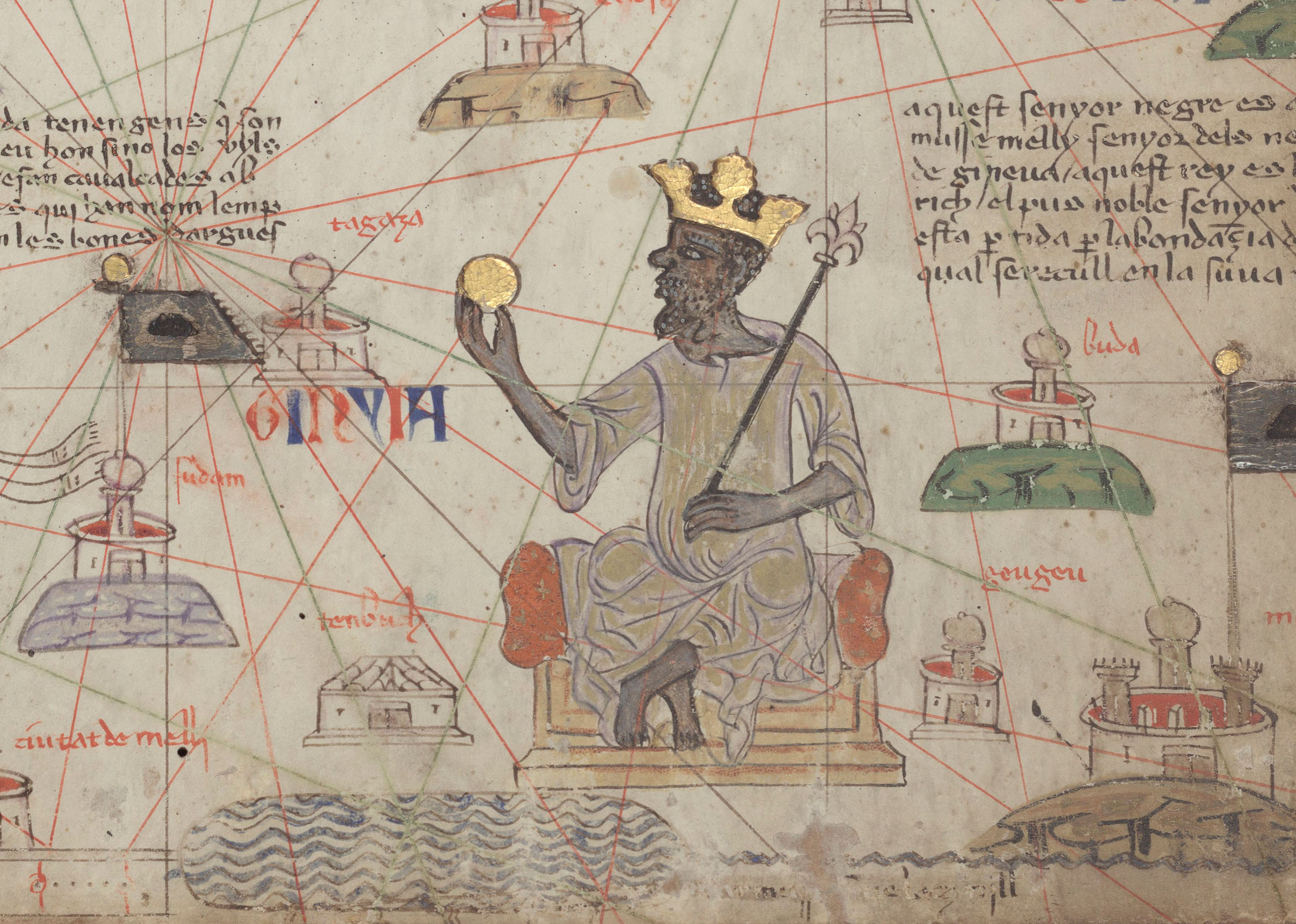
Mansa Musa I of Mali, described as the wealthiest individual in history

- The Little Ice Age was a period of widespread cooling which, while conventionally defined as extending from around the 16th to the 19th centuries, is dated by some experts to a timespan from about 1300 to about 1850, during which average global temperatures dropped by as much as 2 °C (3.6 °F), particularly in Europe and North America. This created conditions for a shortened growing season and reduced crop yields that led to the famines in those areas.
- 1302: Fall of Outremer: Egyptians seize all the Crusader campaign’s possessions in the Holy Land.
- 1303: Mamluk Sultanate of Egypt defeats the Mongols in the Battle of Marj al-Saffar. Egyptians enter Damascus and chases the Mongols as far as Al-Qaryatayn in Syria.
- 1305–1314: The Trials of the Knights Templar. The Knights Templar arrested and tried Jacques de Molay, the last grand master of the Templars, who was executed in 1314.
- 1309: King Jayanegara succeeds Kertarajasa Jayawardhana as ruler of Majapahit.
- 1309–1377: The Avignon papacy transfers the seat of the Popes from Italy to France.

=== 1310s ===
- The Great Famine of 1315–1317 kills millions of people in Europe.
- 1318–1330: An Italian Franciscan friar, Mattiussi, visited Sumatra, Java, and Banjarmasin in Borneo. In his record he described the kingdom of Majapahit.

=== 1320s ===
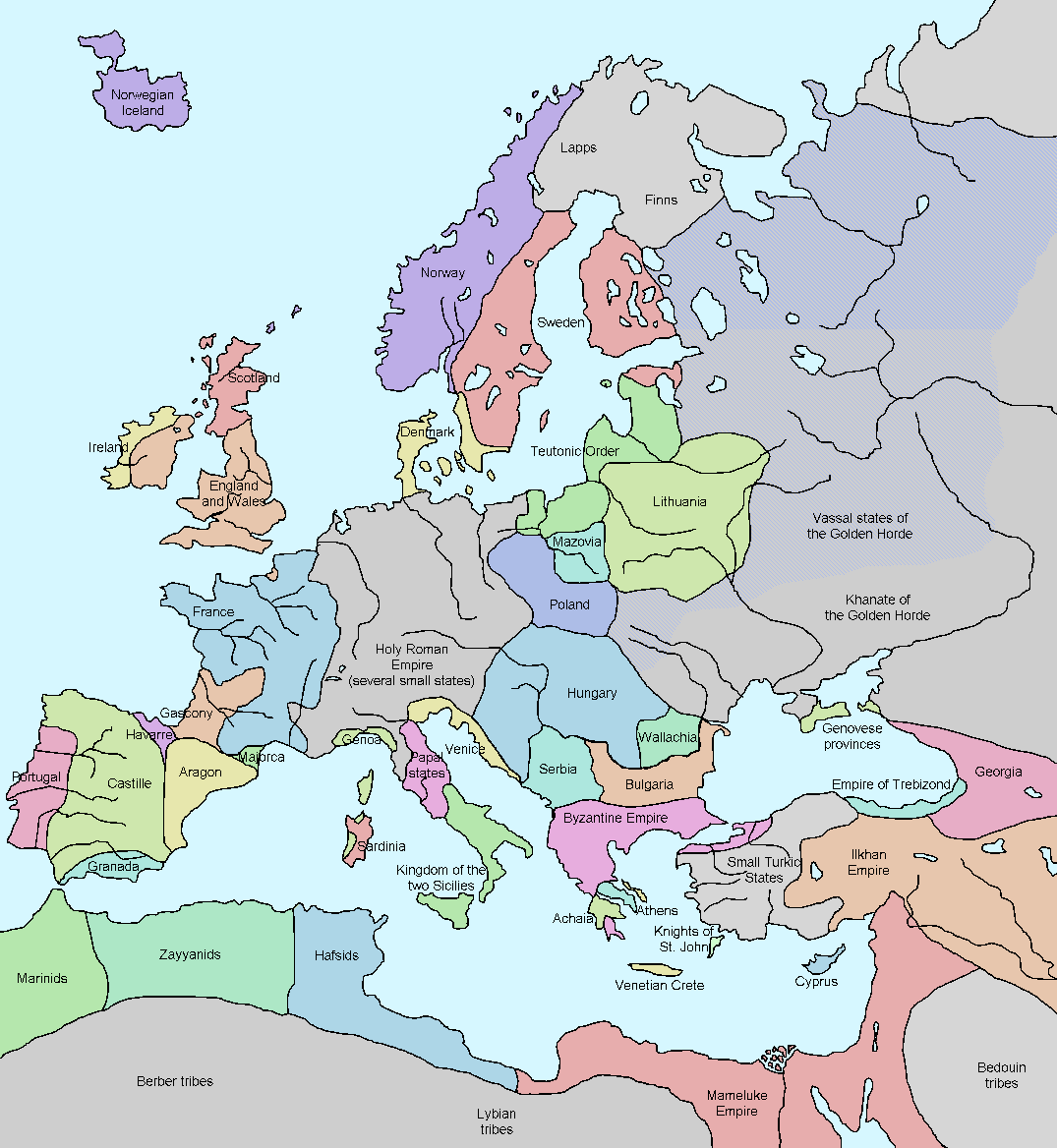
Europe in 1328

- 1320: Władysław I the Elbow-high is crowned King of Poland which leads to its later unification.
- 1320: Rinchan Shah converts to Islam, establishing the Kashmir Sultanate.
- 1321: Dante Alighieri: Divine Comedy.
- 1323: Malietoafaiga ordered cannibalism to be abolished in Tutuila (present-day American Samoa).
- 1325: Forced out of previous habitations, the Mexica found the city of Tenochtitlan.
- 1327: Tver Uprising against the Golden Horde.
- 1328: Tribhuwana Wijayatunggadewi succeeds Jayanegara as ruler of Majapahit.
- 1328–1333: Wang Dayuan, a traveller from Quanzhou, China during the Yuan dynasty, visited Luzon and Mindanao in the Philippines, many places in Southeast Asia, Sri Lanka and India, and reached Dhofar and Aden.

=== 1330s ===
The successor states of the Mongol Empire in 1335: the Ilkhanate, Golden Horde, Yuan dynasty and Chagatai Khanate. The Mongol expansion into the Middle East was halted by the Mamluk Sultanate of Egypt.

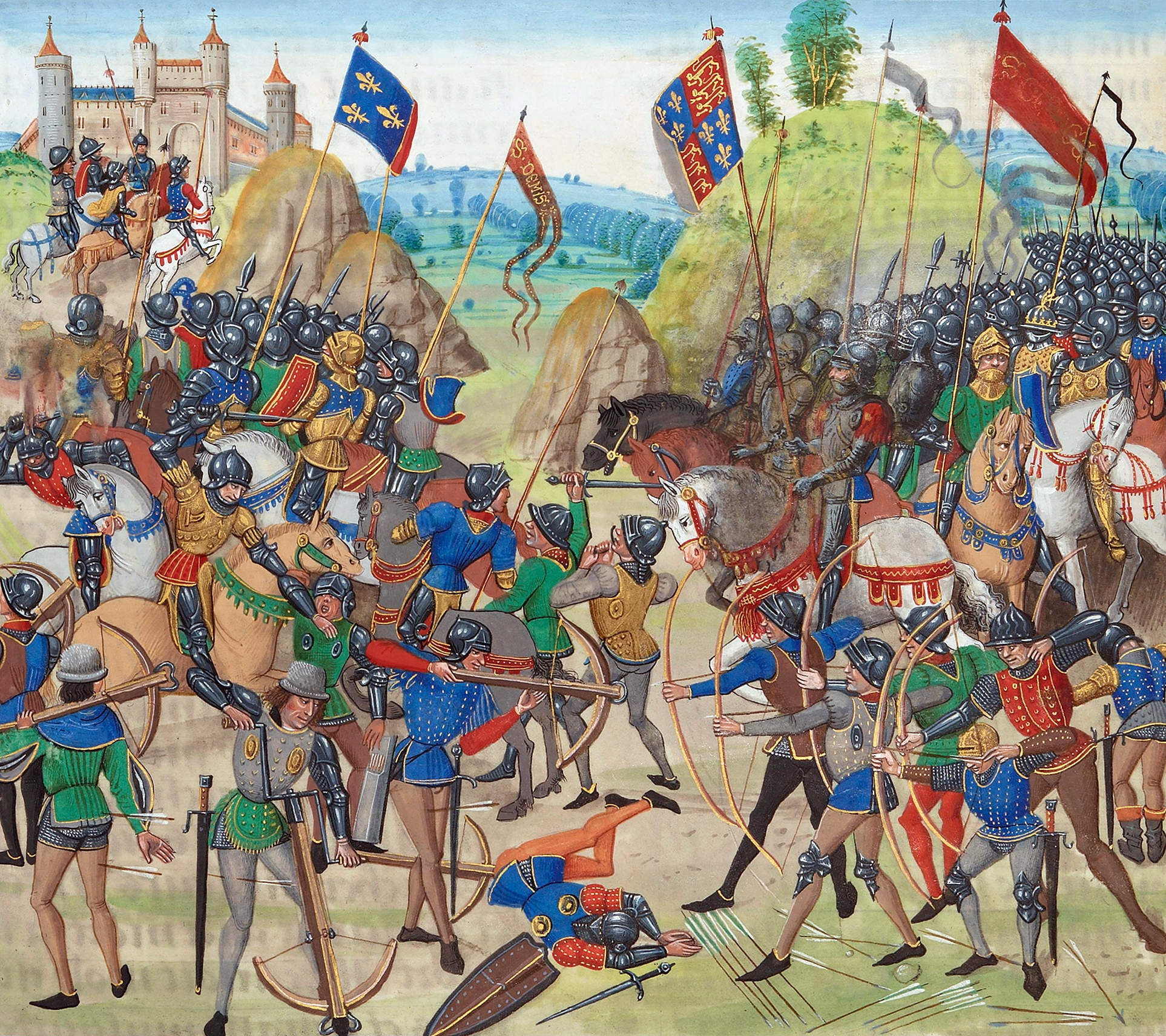
The Battle of Crécy, one of the most important battles of the Hundred Years' War, from Froissart's Chronicles

- 1330: The Battle of Posada results in a major Wallachian victory, sanctioning the independence of the first Romanian principality, Wallachia.
- 1331–1333: The Genkō War in Japan deposes the Kamakura Shogunate, ending the Kamakura Period and beginning the Kenmu Restoration under Emperor Go-Daigo.
- 1335: Jalaluddin Ahsan Khan, Governor of Madurai, declares independence from the Delhi Sultanate.
- 1335: The death of the Ilkhan Abu Said causes the disintegration of the Mongol rule in Persia.
- 1336: The Vijayanagara Empire is founded in South India by Harihara I.
- 1336: The Kenmu Restoration ends and the Muromachi period begins in Japan; start of the Nanboku-chō period.
- 1337: The Hundred Years' War begins when Edward III of England lays claim to the French throne.
- 1338–1339: The Shah Mir–Lohara War results in the revival of the Kashmir Sultanate.

Burying coffins of Black Death victims in Tournai

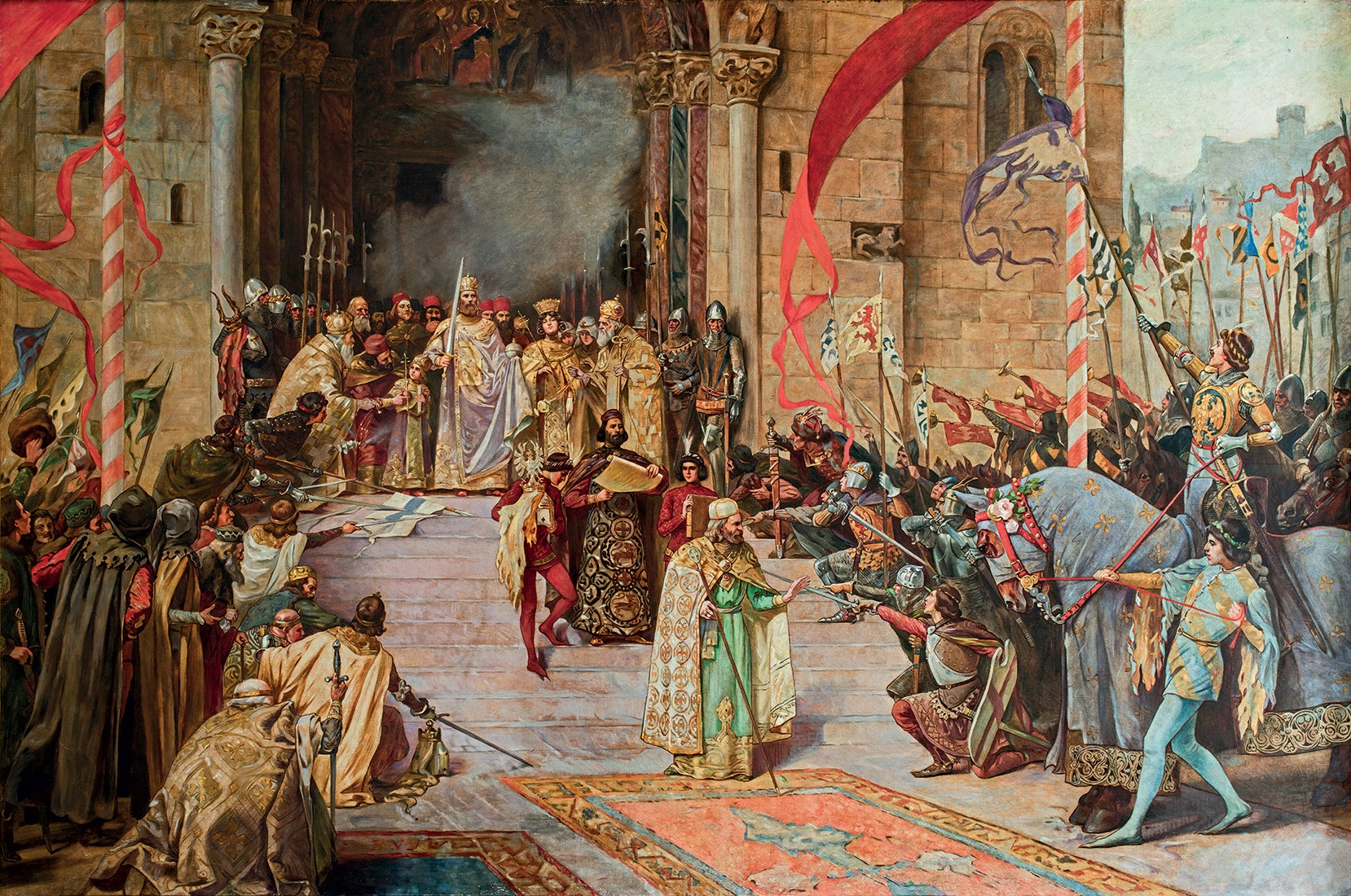
The Coronation of the tsar Stefan Dušan, known as Dušan the Mighty, in Skopje, as Emperor of Serbs and Greeks in 1346

=== 1340s ===
- 1343–1345: In Saint George's Night Uprising, pagan Estonians launch a last large-scale attempt to rid themselves of the non-indigenous Christian religion.
- 1345–1346: The French recruit troops and ships in Genoa, Monaco, and Nice.
- 1346: English forces led by Edward III defeat a French army led by Philip VI of France in The Battle of Crécy, a major point in the Hundred Years' War which marks the rise of the longbow as a dominant weapon in Western Europe.
- 1346: King Valdemar IV of Denmark sells the Duchy of Estonia to the Teutonic Order.
- 1346: The principality of Moldavia emerges between the Eastern Carpathians and the Prut river.
- 1346–1347: The Rebellion of Ismail Mukh spreads across the Deccan; establishing the Bahmani Sultanate.
- 1347–1351: The Black Death kills around a third of the population of Europe.
- 1347: Adityawarman moved the capital of Dharmasraya and established the kingdom of Malayupura in Pagarruyung, West Sumatra.
- 1348: The 6.9-magnitude 1348 Friuli earthquake centered in Northern Italy was felt across Europe. Contemporaries linked the quake with the Black Death and Great Famine, fueling fears that the Biblical Apocalypse had arrived.
- 1346 : official elevation to Patriarchate of an independent national Church in Europe, the Serbian Orthodox Church.

=== 1350s ===
- 1350: Ramathibodi I establishes the Ayutthaya Kingdom.
- 1350: Hayam Wuruk, styled Sri Rajasanagara, succeeds Tribhuwana Wijayatunggadewi as ruler of Majapahit; his reign is considered the empire's 'Golden Age'. Under its military commander Gajah Mada, Majapahit stretches over much of modern-day Indonesia.
- 1351: The Red Turban Rebellions break out along the Huai River valley, beginning a nearly 20-year period of uprisings against the Mongol-led Yuan dynasty in China.
- 1353: Fa Ngum established the Lan Xang kingdom in Laos.
- 1356: The Imperial Diet of the Holy Roman Empire headed by Emperor Charles IV issues the Golden Bull of 1356, establishing various constitutional aspects of the Empire, the most significant being the electoral college to elect future emperors.
- 1356: The Diet of the Hansa is held in Lübeck, formalising what up until then had only been a loose alliance of trading cities in northern Europe and officially founding the Hanseatic League.
- 1357: Scotland retains its independence with the signing of the Treaty of Berwick, thus ending the Wars of Scottish Independence.
- 1357: In the Battle of Bubat, the Sundanese royal family is massacred by the Majapahit army by the order of Gajah Mada; the death toll includes Sundanese king Lingga Buana and princess Dyah Pitaloka Citraresmi, who committed suicide.

=== 1360s ===
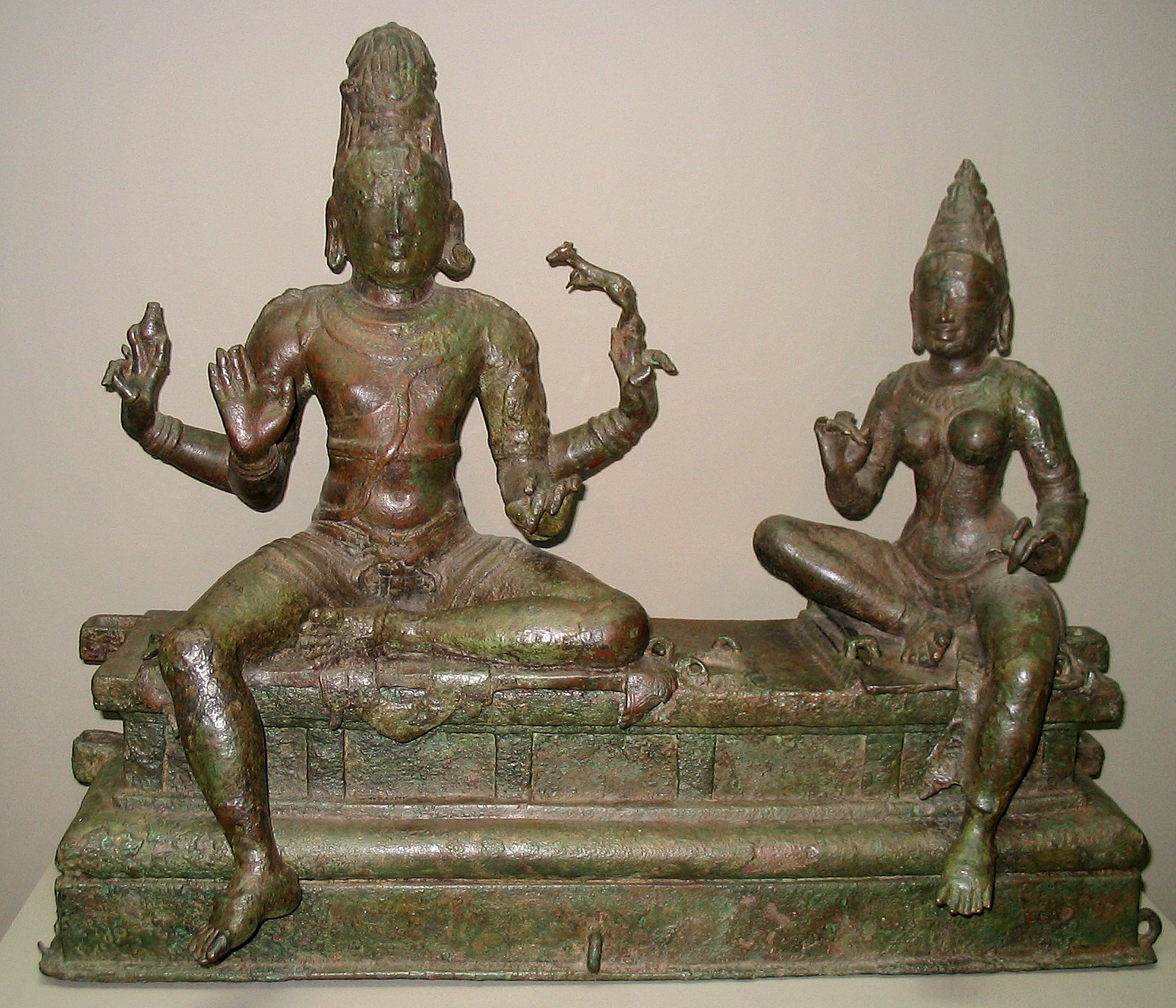
This 14th-century statue from Tamil Nadu, present day India depicts the gods Shiva (on the left) and Uma (on the right). It is housed in the Smithsonian Institution in Washington, D.C.

- 1363: The Battle of Lake Poyang, a naval conflict between Chinese rebel groups led by Chen Youliang and Zhu Yuanzhang, takes place from August to October, constituting one of the largest naval battles in history.
- 1364: Foundation of the University of Kraków
- 1365: The Old Javanese text Nagarakertagama is written.
- 1366: Tepanec Tlatoani Acolnahuácatl accepts Acamapichtli as the first tlatoani of Tenochtitlan for the Mexica Empire.
- 1367: Mamluk Sultanate of Egypt defeats a coalition of Kingdom of Cyprus, Republic of Genoa, and Knights Hospitaller in the Battle of Tripoli, ending the raid in a disaster.
- 1368: The end of the Mongol-led Yuan dynasty in China and the beginning of the Ming dynasty.

=== 1370s ===
- 1371: The Battle of Maritsa, the Serbs are defeated by the Ottomans, with most of Serb nobility being killed.
- 1373: First pound lock in Europe reportedly built in Vreeswijk, Netherlands
- 1377: Majapahit sends a punitive expedition against Palembang in Sumatra. Palembang's prince, Parameswara (later Iskandar Syah) flees, eventually finding his way to Malacca and establishing it as a major international port.
- 1378: The Great Schism of the West splits the Catholic Church, eventually leading to three simultaneous popes and not resolved until 1417.
- 1378: Battle of the Vozha River between Russians and Mongols.
- 1378–1382: Ciompi Revolt occurs in Florence.

=== 1380s ===
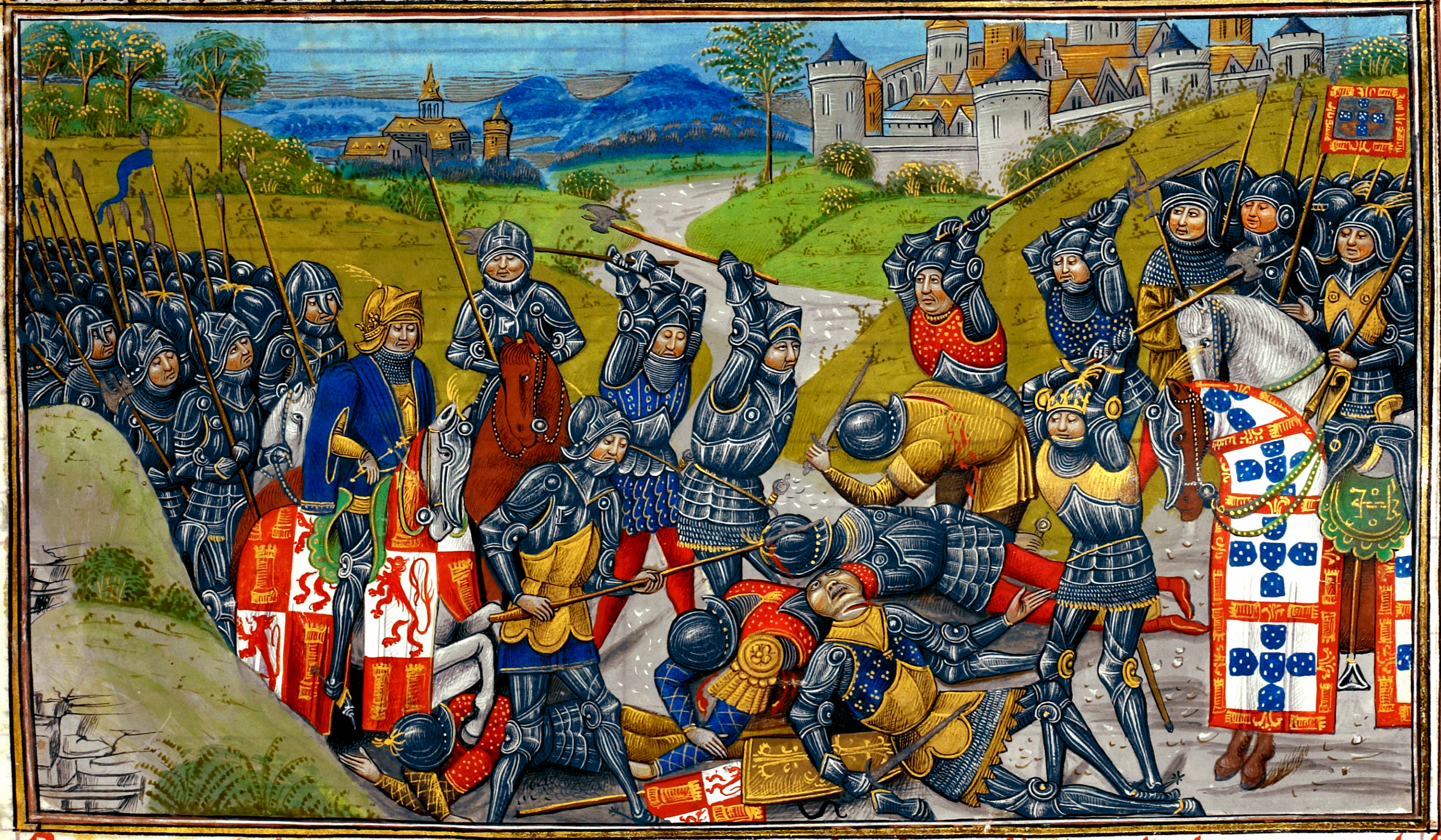
The Portuguese interregnum, Battle of Aljubarrota between the Portuguese and Castilians in 1385

- 1380: Russian principalities defeat the Golden Horde at the Battle of Kulikovo.
- 1381: John Wycliffe is dismissed from the University of Oxford for criticism of the Catholic Church, leading to the Lollardy movement in England.
- 1381: Peasants' Revolt in England.
- 1382: Khan Tokhtamysh captures Moscow.
- 1382: Barquq rise to power to start the Burji dynasty, the Circassian Mamuluk Dynasty in Egypt.
- 1385: Battle of Aljubarrota between Portugal and Castile. Portugal maintains independence.
- 1385: Union of Krewo between Poland and Lithuania.
- 1389: Battle of Kosovo between Serbs and Ottoman Turks; Prince Lazar, Sultan Murad I and Miloš Obilić are killed.
- 1389: Wikramawardhana succeeds Sri Rajasanagara as ruler of Majapahit.

=== 1390–1400 ===
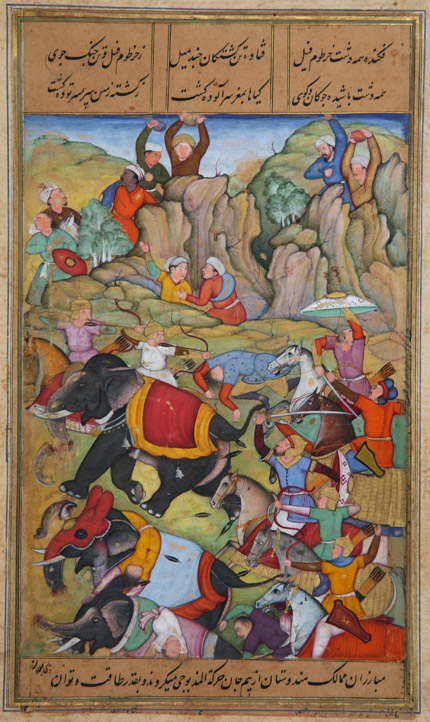
Timur defeats the Sultan of Delhi, Nasir-ud-Din Mahmud Shah Tughluq, in the winter of 1397–1398, painting dated 1595–1600.

- 1391: Anti-Jewish pogroms spread throughout Spain and Portugal, and many thousands of Jews are massacred.
- 1392: Taejo of Joseon establishes the Joseon Dynasty.
- 1392: Emperor Go-Kameyama of Japan abdicates in favor of rival claimant Go-Komatsu, in order to end the Nanboku-chō period of conflict between the Northern and Southern imperial courts.
- 1394: Capture of Baghdad: Baghdad returns to the Jalayirid Sultanate under Egyptian patronage.
- 1394: Malik Sarwar, Governor of Jaunpur, declares de facto independence from the Delhi Sultanate.
- 1394: Zafar Khan, Governor of Gujarat, declares de facto independence from the Delhi Sultanate.
- 1396: The Battle of Nicopolis, in which the Ottoman Empire defeats a large Crusader army of knights and infantry from various Christian kingdoms including Hungary, France, the Holy Roman Empire, Burgundy and Wallachia.
- 1396: The Second Bulgarian Empire ends, with the capture of the last stronghold fortress of Vidin and its king Ivan Sratsimir by the Ottomans.
- 1397: The Kalmar Union is established, uniting Norway, Sweden and Denmark into one kingdom.
- 1397: Reign of Chimalpopoca begins as the third tlatoani of Tenochtitlan.
- 1399: Zhu Di launches the Jingnan campaign from Beiping (Beijing) to unseat his nephew, the Jianwen Emperor.

== Undated ==
- Transition from the Medieval Warm Period to the Little Ice Age.
- Crisis of the Late Middle Ages
- The poet Petrarch coins the term Dark Ages to describe the preceding 900 years in Europe, beginning with the fall of the Western Roman Empire in 476 through to the renewal embodied in the Renaissance.
- Beginning of the Ottoman Empire, early expansion into the Balkans.
- Iwan vault, Jamé Mosque of Isfahan, Isfahan, Iran, is built.
- Early 14th century: Kao Ninga paints Monk Sewing (attributed) in the Kamakura period (Cleveland Museum collection).
- An account of Buddha's life, translated earlier into Greek by Saint John of Damascus and widely circulated to Christians as the story of Barlaam and Josaphat, became so popular that the two were venerated as saints.
- Singapore emerges for the first time as an important fortified city and trading centre.
- Islam reaches Terengganu, on the Malay Peninsula as evidence by the Terengganu Inscription Stone.
- The Hausa found several city-states in the south of modern Niger.
- Work begins on the Great Enclosure at Great Zimbabwe, built of non-cemented, dressed stone. Research suggests the city's population to be between less than 10,000 to 18,000 at its peak.

== Inventions, discoveries, introductions ==
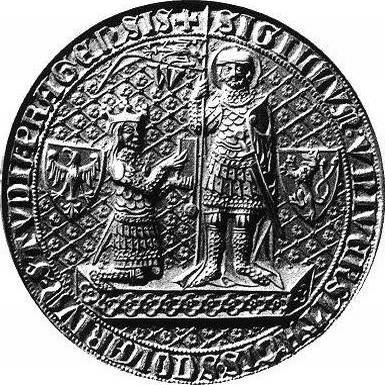
Founded in April 1348 by Holy Roman Emperor Charles IV, Charles University in Prague is the oldest university in Central Europe.

- Music of Ars nova
- Chinese text the Huolongjing by Jiao Yu describes fire lances, fire arrows, rocket launchers, land mines, naval mines, bombards, cannons, and hollow cast iron cannonballs filled with gunpowder, and their use to set ablaze enemy camps
