= Battle of the Sutlej =

14th-century military confrontation between Kashmir Sultanate and Delhi Sultanate

Battle of the Sutlej (1370)
| Date | c. 1370 |
| Location | Banks of the Sutlej River, near Sirhind |
| Result | Inconclusive § Outcome |
| Territorial changes | West of Sutlej given to Kashmir while east of Sutlej remains under Delhi's control |

Belligerents
| Kashmir Sultanate | Delhi Sultanate |

Commanders and leaders
| Shihabu'd-Din Shah | Firuz Shah Tughlaq |

Strength
| 50,000 | Unknown |

Battle of the Sutlej (Note: Persian: نبرد ستلج) (also known as the Treaty of the Sutlej) was a 14th-century military standoff in the Punjab region between the armies of Shihabu'd-Din Shah Miri (r. 1354–1373), the fifth Sultan of the Kashmir Sultanate from the Shah Mir dynasty, and Firuz Shah Tughluq (r. 1351–1388), Sultan of Delhi from the Tughluq dynasy. The conflict arose from the Kashmiri Sultan's ambitious southern expeditions into the Punjab and the Tughlaq monarch's attempt to defend the northern frontiers of the Delhi Sultanate. The armies met on the banks of the Sutlej River, leading to an indecisive confrontation followed by a peace treaty.

This conflict and subsequent agreement significantly expanded the Kashmir Sultanate's western territories while establishing marital alliances between the two ruling houses.

== Historiography ==
The event is primarily documented in Kashmiri chronicles such as the Baharistan-i-Shahi and later Persian histories like those by Haidar Malik Chadura and Jonaraja's continuations of the Rajatarangini, as well as modern analyses drawing on them (e.g., Mohibbul Hasan's Kashmir Under the Sultans). Delhi Sultanate sources, including Shams-i Siraj Afif's Tarikh-i-Firuz Shahi, do not emphasize or detail the encounter, consistent with Firuz Shah's focus on other campaigns (e.g., Bengal and Kangra). No exact date is recorded in primary sources, but it occurred during Shihabu'd-Din's reign (1354–1373), likely in late 1360s or early 1370s.

== Background ==
Sultan Shihabu'd-Din, often called the "Lalitaditya of Medieval Kashmir," was a prolific conqueror. He consolidated the Kashmir Valley and subdued the regions of Ladakh, Baltistan, Gilgit, Chitral, and Jammu. Emboldened by these successes, Shihabu'd-Din marched westward toward Delhi, encroaching on territories claimed by the Delhi Sultanate.

According to the chronicler Jonaraja, Shihabu'd-Din marched through the Punjab, receiving submission from several local Hindu and Muslim chieftains. His rapid expansion brought him into direct contact with the territories of Firuz Shah Tughlaq, who was then the ruler of the Delhi Sultanate. Tughluq responded by deploying forces to intercept the advance.

== Battle ==
The two armies met on the banks of the Sutlej River (near or involving the region around Sirhind in some accounts). Contemporary and later Kashmiri sources describe it as a confrontation or standoff rather than a full-scale battle. The encounter proved "indecisive" or "motive-less" for the Delhi side, with no prolonged fighting recorded. Jonaraja records that both Sultans realized that a prolonged war would be mutually destructive.

Shihabu'd-Din was far from his supply lines in the mountains as his forces had advanced deep into Punjab (having already secured areas like the Pothohar Plateau), but Firuz Shah's army halted further progress without committing to a decisive engagement. A key turning point was the intervention of Mir Sayyid Ali Hamadani, a Sufi saint. He reportedly mediated between the two rulers and urged peace, which both sides accepted.

== Outcome ==
The conflict ended with a negotiated settlement known as the Treaty of Sirhind.

- The territory from Sirhind to Kashmir would belong to the Kashmir Sultanate while land from Sirhind to Delhi would belong to Delhi Sultanate.
- Firuz Shah effectively recognized Shihabu'd-Din as an independent and equal sovereign, a rarity for the Delhi Sultans of that era.
- Daughters of Firuz Shah were married to Shihabu'd-Din and his brother and successor Qutbu'd-Din. Consequently, a daughter of Shihabu'd-Din was married to Firuz Shah.
