= Jamshid Shah Miri =

Sultan of Kashmir (r. 1342–1343)

Jamshid جمشید
- Sultan of Kashmir

3rd Sultan of Kashmir
- Reign: 6 July 1342 – 6 May 1343
- Coronation: 1342
- Predecessor: Shamsu'd-Din Shah
- Successor: Alau'd-Din Shah
- Died: 1343; Kashmir, Shah-Mir Sultanate
- Burial: Kashmir
Names
- Jamshid Shah Miri
- Dynasty: Shah Mir dynasty
- Father: Shamsu'd-Din Shah Mir
- Religion: Sunni Islam

Jamshid Shah Miri (Kashmiri and Persian: جمشید شاہ میری) also known as Jamshid Shah or Jamshed Shah) was the third Sultan of Kashmir who ruled from 1342 to 1343.

== Early life ==
Jamshid was born in the wake of his father Shah Mir's military and serviced exertion in Kashmir during the invasion of Mongol commander Zulchu in the early 14th century. Jamshid grew up along with his brother Ali Sher in the court of Rinchan and later Udayanadeva.

== Rise to power ==
=== As governor of Kamraz ===
Jamshid's sheer expertise and martial adeptness with regards to his strong nature were well cherished even by the Maharaja himself. By gaining the trust of Maharaja Udayanadeva, Jamshid was appointed as the governor of Kamraj, the office which solidified his armoured wall even further.

Jamshid carried his laws in the region and worked efficiently for the people of Kamraj. Warmly welcomed, he established himself in Sopore from where the orders were executed. Jamshid carried out his role as a governor till Shah Mir started an armed rebellion against the Maharani Kota.

=== As heir apparent of Kashmir ===
Jamshid supported his father in his campaign against the Maharani. He played a crucial role in subduing the Lohara army. In 1339, Shah Mir overcame the Lohara forces and revived the Kashmir Sultanate, once established by Rinchan, by founding his own dynasty named Shah Mir after him. He also proclaimed himself the 2nd Sultan of Kashmir while Jamshid was selected as the heir apparent. Jamshid was also appointed in other important offices in the government of his father.
