= Shah Mir =

Sultan of Kashmir (1339–1342)

Shams-ud-Din Shah
- Sultanu'l-A'zam
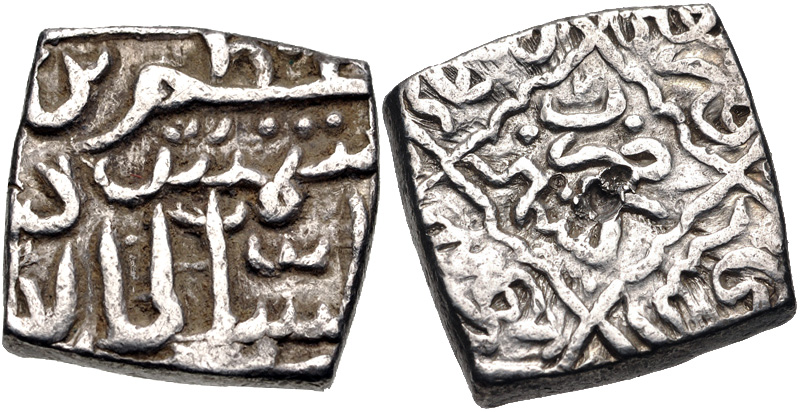
- Silver Sasnu Coin of Kashmir Sultanate

Sultan of Kashmir
- Reign: 4 July 1339 – 6 July 1342
- Coronation: 4 July 1339
- Predecessor: Kota Rani (as Maharani of Kashmir); Sadr'ud-Din Shah (as Sultan of Kashmir)
- Successor: Jamshid Shah
- Born: c. 1300; Sultanate of Swāt (present-day Swat District, Khyber Pakhtunkhwa, Pakistan)
- Died: 6 July 1342 (aged 41–42); Inderkot Sumbal, Kashmir Sultanate (Srinagar, Jammu and Kashmir, India)
- Issue: Jamshid Shah; Alauddin Shah
Names
- Shāh Mīr bin Ṭāhir bin Waqūr Shāh
Regnal name
- Shamsu'd-Dīn Shāh
Posthumous name
- Fāteh-e-Kashmīr (Conqueror of Kashmir)
- House: Jahangiri (by birth) (disputed); Shah Mir (founder)
- Dynasty: Gibari (disputed)
- Father: Tahir bin Waqur Shah
- Religion: Sunni Islam

Shamsu'd-Din Shah Mir (Persian: سلطان شمس الدین شاه میر, romanized: Sultān Mīr Shams ad-Dīn Shāh; c. 1300 – 6 July 1342), also known simply as Shah Mir or Shah Mirza, was the second Sultan of Kashmir and founder of the Shah Mir dynasty. Shah Mir is believed to have come to Kashmir during the rule of Suhadeva, where he rose to prominence. After the death of Suhadeva and his brother, Udayanadeva, Shah Mir proposed marriage to the reigning queen, Kota Rani. She refused and continued her rule for five months till 1339, appointing Bhutta Bhikshana as prime minister. After the death of Kota Rani, Shah Mir established his own kingship, founding the Shah Mir dynasty in 1339, which lasted till 1561.

== Origin ==
Modern scholarship differ on the origins of Shah Mir. However, modern historians generally accept that Shah Mir was from Swāt in Dardistan. Some accounts trace his descent from the rulers of Swāt. (Note: The chronicles include those of Tahir, Haidar Malik, Rafiu'd Din Ahmad and Muhammad A'azam.)

Some scholars state that Shah Mir arrived from the Panjgabbar Valley (Panchagahvara), which was populated by Khasa people, and so ascribe a Khasa ethnicity to Shah Mir.

Encyclopaedia of Islam (second edition) suggests a possible Turkish origins. Andre Wink puts forward the opinion that Shah Mir was possibly of Afghan, Qarauna Turk, or even Tibetan origin, while A.Q. Rafiqi believes that Shah Mir was a descendant of Turkish or Persian immigrants to Swat.

Older sources by contemporary Kashmiri historians, such as Jonaraja, state that Shah Mir was the descendant of Partha (Arjuna) of the ancient Sanskrit epic Mahabharata. Abu ’l-Fadl Allami, Nizam al-Din and Firishta, also state that Shah Mir traced his descent to Arjuna, the basis of their account being Jonaraja's Rajatarangini, which Mulla Abd al-Qadir Bada’uni translated into Persian at Akbar's orders. This seems to be official genealogy of the Sultanate. Based on this tradition, Aziz Ahmad considers it more probable that Shah Mir was a descendant of a convert from Hinduism only a few generation earlier, probably by a Sufi mystic.

== Early career ==
=== Early Service ===
A. Q. Rafiqi states:

Shah Mir arrived in Kashmir in 1313 along with his family, during the reign of Suhadeva (1301–1320), whose service he entered. In subsequent years, through his tact and ability Shah Mir rose to prominence and became one of the most important personalities of his time.

Annemarie Schimmel suggests that Shah Mir belonged to a family from Swat which accompanied the sage Mir Sayyid Ali Hamadani, and were associated with the Kubrawiya, a Sufi group active in Kashmir. During the reign of Suhadeva, a Tatar chief by the name of Zulju invaded Kashmir and ravaged it. Suhadeva fled the country and his general Ramachandra occupied the throne. In the confusion, an exiled Ladakhi prince in Kashmir, Rinchan (r. 1320–1323), sought the aid of various generals, including Shah Mir, and led an internal uprising, seizing the throne. Rinchan embraced Islam at the hands of the ascetic, Bulbul Shah, and took the Muslim name of Sultan Sadruddin. He was later attacked by rebels and was badly wounded, dying in 1323.

Just before his death Sultan Sadruddin summoned his trusted minister, Shah Mir, who had since then risen to some prominence, and put his son, Haider, and wife, Kota Rani, in his care. After the death of Sadruddin, Kota Rani married Udayanadeva, the brother of Suhadeva. However he was a weak ruler, so nearly all duties associated with governance fell on Kota Rani.

=== During and After the Later Turco-Mongol Invasion ===
During the reign of Udayanadeva, the Kashmir Valley was again invaded by Mongol-Turk forces, and Udayanadeva fled to Ladakh. Kota Rani, along with Shah Mir, called upon the many disorganized Damara (warlords of Kashmir), rallying them together. This now unified resistance defeated the invading armies, prompting their retreat from the valley.

==== Revolt Against Kota Rani ====
In the aftermath of the conflict, Shah Mir won prestige for his role in unifying the people. Kota Rani took notice of his increasing popularity, and in an effort to check him, appointed Bhatta Bhiksana, a powerful man within the kingdom, as her Prime Minister. She also decided to move her capital to Andarkot, away from Srinagar, where Shah Mir had a great influence. This enraged Shah Mir, as he felt ignored in spite of his great labors for the kingdom. He had Bhiksana assassinated, and asked Kota Rani to marry him and share power, threatening to wage war on her if she was to refuse. She declined, and the two of them began organizing their armies.

Shah Mir set out with his army from Srinagar towards Andarkot. Kota Rani sent out a force to check his advance, but it was promptly defeated. The fort at Andarkot was then laid siege to. While this was going on, many of Kota Rani's troops, seeing the futility of the situation, deserted and joined Shah Mir, to whom most important chiefs in the kingdom had already pledged allegiance.

Kota Rani soon surrendered, and accepted Shah Mir's earlier proposal. However given the awkward situation in which Kota Rani accepted, and the possibility for a counter-uprising, made more probable when accounting for the small slivers of support Kota Rani still had, Shah Mir could not take any risks. Kota Rani and her two sons were imprisoned, where they later died.

== Reign ==
With Kota Rani defeated and having already secured the allegiance of the powerful damara warlords, Shah Mir declared himself the ruler of Kashmir, taking on the title of Sultan Shams-ud-Din.

Shams-ud-Din worked to firmly establish Islam in Kashmir and was aided by his descendants. In an effort to keep the local feudal chiefs in check, he raised to power two indigenous families, the Magres and the Chaks. He also introduced a new era to the people of Kashmir, called the Kashmiri Era. This replaced the Laukika Era that had existed prior to this. The Kashmiri Era began with Rinchan's accession and conversion to Islam in 1320 CE (720 AH). This era remained in use until the Mughal conquest of Kashmir in 1586. Shams-ud-Din had two sons, Jamshed and Ali Sher.

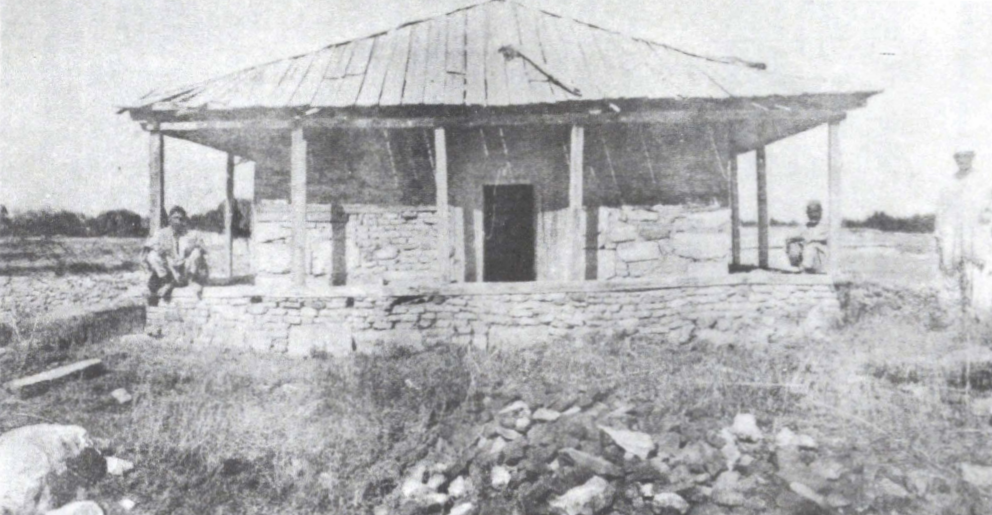
The Tomb of Sultan Shams-ud-Din Shah Mir.

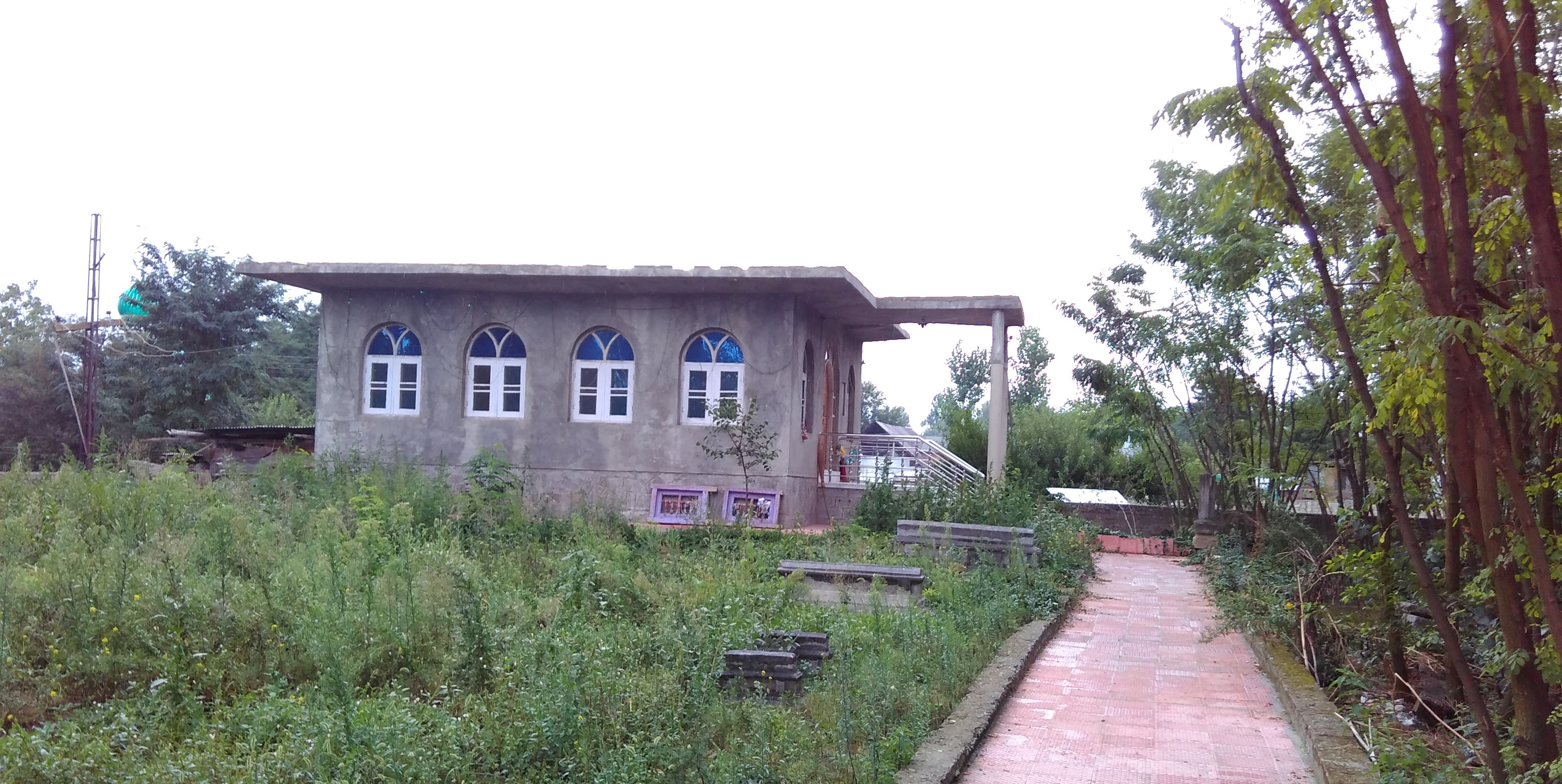
Renovated tomb of Sultan Shahmir in Indrakot Sumbal

He reigned for three years and five months from 1339–42. He is currently buried in Andarkot, near Sumbal.

== Succession ==
Sultan Shah Mir died in 1342. He was succeeded by Sultan Jamshid Shah Miri as the second sultan of Shah Mir Dynasty.

== See also ==
- Shah Miri dynasty – Muslim dynasty of Kashmir (1339–1561)
- Sikandar Butshikan – Sultan of Kashmir from 1389 to 1413
- Mir Sayyid Ali Hamadani – Sufi kubrawiyyah scholar and Alim (c. 1312–1384)

== Bibliography ==
- Baloch, N. A.; Rafiq, A. Q. (1998), "The Regions of Sind, Baluchistan, Multan and Kashmir" (PDF), in M. S. Asimov; C. E. Bosworth (eds.), History of Civilizations of Central Asia, Vol. IV, Part 1 — The age of achievement: A.D. 750 to the end of the fifteenth century — The historical, social and economic setting, UNESCO, pp. 297–322, ISBN 978-92-3-103467-1
- Schimmel, Annemarie (1980), Islam in the Indian Subcontinent, BRILL, pp. 44–, ISBN 90-04-06117-7
- Wink, André (2004), Indo-Islamic society: 14th - 15th centuries, BRILL, ISBN 90-04-13561-8
