= 1339 =

1339 in various calendars
- Gregorian calendar: 1339; MCCCXXXIX
- Ab urbe condita: 2092
- Armenian calendar: 788; ԹՎ ՉՁԸ
- Assyrian calendar: 6089
- Balinese saka calendar: 1260–1261
- Bengali calendar: 745–746
- Berber calendar: 2289
- English Regnal year: 12 Edw. 3 – 13 Edw. 3
- Buddhist calendar: 1883
- Burmese calendar: 701
- Byzantine calendar: 6847–6848
- Chinese calendar: 戊寅年 (Earth Tiger); 4036 or 3829 — to — 己卯年 (Earth Rabbit); 4037 or 3830
- Coptic calendar: 1055–1056
- Discordian calendar: 2505
- Ethiopian calendar: 1331–1332
- Hebrew calendar: 5099–5100
- Hindu calendars
- Vikram Samvat: 1395–1396
- Shaka Samvat: 1260–1261
- Kali Yuga: 4439–4440
- Holocene calendar: 11339
- Igbo calendar: 339–340
- Iranian calendar: 717–718
- Islamic calendar: 739–740
- Japanese calendar: Ryakuō 2 (暦応２年)
- Javanese calendar: 1251–1252
- Julian calendar: 1339; MCCCXXXIX
- Korean calendar: 3672
- Minguo calendar: 573 before ROC 民前573年
- Nanakshahi calendar: −129
- Thai solar calendar: 1881–1882
- Tibetan calendar: ས་ཕོ་སྟག་ལོ་ (male Earth-Tiger); 1465 or 1084 or 312 — to — ས་མོ་ཡོས་ལོ་ (female Earth-Hare); 1466 or 1085 or 313

Year 1339 (MCCCXXXIX) was a common year starting on Friday of the Julian calendar.

== Events ==
=== January–December ===
- June – Battle of Laupen: The Canton of Bern defeats the forces of Fribourg.
- September 18 – Emperor Go-Murakami accedes to the throne of Japan.
- September 24 (or 28) – Simone Boccanegra is elected, as the first Doge of Genoa.

=== Date unknown ===
- Shams-ud-Din Shah Mir, having defeated Kota Rani, Hindu queen regnant of Kashmir, in battle at Jayapur (modern Sumbal), asks her to marry him, but she commits suicide rather than do so; thus he takes over sole rule of Kashmir, beginning the Muslim Shah Mir Dynasty.
- All streets in the city of Florence are paved, the first European city in post-Roman times where this has happened.
- The Moscow Kremlin is first referred to as a kremlin.

== Births ==
- July 23 – Louis I, Duke of Anjou (d. 1384)
- November 1 – Rudolf IV, Duke of Austria (d. 1365)
- date unknown:
  - Pope Alexander V, Antipope (d. 1410)
  - Erik Magnusson (Erik XII), king of parts of Sweden 1356–1359 (d. 1359)
  - Frederick, Duke of Bavaria-Landshut (d. 1393)
  - Pope Innocent VII (d. 1406)
  - Duke John IV of Brittany (d. 1399)
  - Juana Manuel of Castile, queen consort of Castile (d. 1381)
  - Ali ibn Mohammed al-Jurjani, Persian Arab encyclopaedist (d. 1414)

== Deaths ==
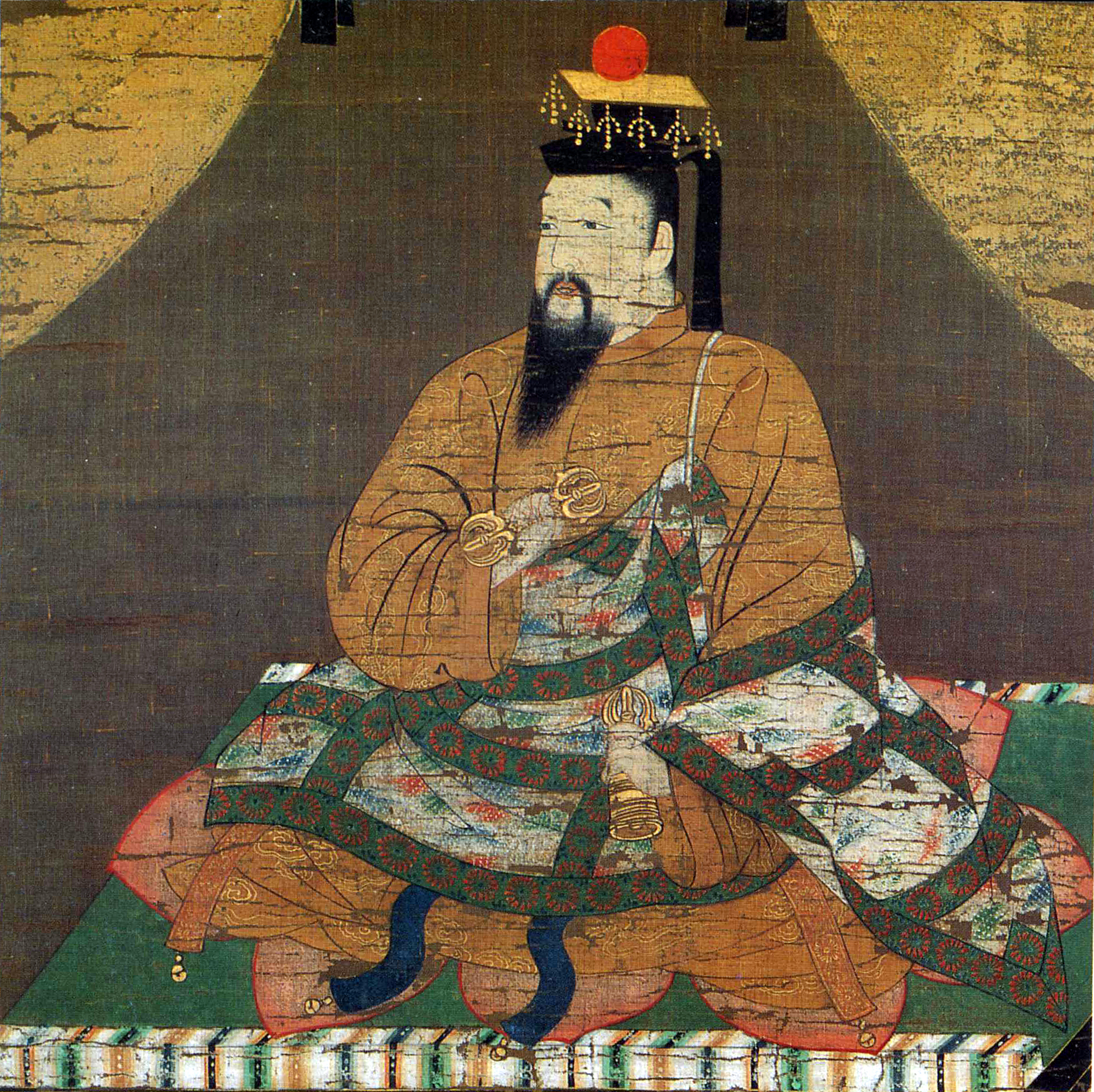
Emperor Go-Daigo

- February 17 – Otto, Duke of Austria (b. 1301)
- May 26 – Aldona Ona, Queen of Poland (b. c. 1309)
- August 16 – Azzone Visconti, founder of the state of Milan (b. 1302)
- August 25 – Henry de Cobham, 1st Baron Cobham (b. 1260)
- September 1 – Henry XIV, Duke of Bavaria (b. 1305)
- September 19 – Emperor Go-Daigo of Japan (b. 1288)
- October 29 – Grand Prince Aleksandr Mikhailovich of Tver (b. 1301)
