= Kutte Kol =

Canal in Jammu and Kashmir

- The Kutte Kol canal in Srinagar (marked orange)

Specifications
- Status: active

Geography
- Start point: Jhelum River
- End point: Jhelum River

Kutte Kol (Urdu pronunciation: [kʊʈɑː koːl] ; Kashmiri pronunciation: [kɨʈɨ kɔl]) is a navigational canal running through the Srinagar city of Jammu and Kashmir in India. It is believed to be commissioned by Kota Rani, a ruler of medieval Kashmir, initially to regulate floods on the Jhelum. Later it was also used for navigation to carry food grains to the city. At present, the canal suffers from massive encroachments and its flow has been drastically reduced. The Srinagar Municipal Corporation plans to restore the canal by dredging and removal of encroachments.

== Etymology ==
Although believed to be named after its supposed commissioner, Kota Rani, a more analytical explanation holds that the name is derived from 'Ksipt Kulya', which means a rivulet of 'Ksipt' (another name for Jhelum).
