= Sultanate of Swat =

Medieval Dardic state in present-day Pakistan

Coordinates: 34°24′30″N 73°10′30″E

The Sultanate of Swat was a medieval Dardic kingdom centred around the city of Manglawar between the 12th and 16th centuries. It was strongest of the several Dardic-speaking states in the region, and encompassed the present-day Malakand, Buner, Panjkora and Swat valleys.

The kingdom bordered Hazara region to the east, Peshawar Valley to the south, Bajaur to the west and the Kohistan region to the north. The last notable ruler was Sultan Awes Jahangiri, during whose reign Swat was ultimately conquered between 1510 and 1518 after a series of battles by Yusufzai Pashtuns under the leadership of Malik Ahmad Khan. This led to the Pashtunization of the Swat and Panjkora regions along with the displacement of Dardic peoples, such as Torwalis and Gawris, to Swat Kohistan and Dir Kohistan. Some accounts trace the origins of Shah Mir dynasty of Kashmir from these rulers of Swat.
