= Qutbu'd-Din Shah =

Sultan of Kashmir from 1373 to 1389

Qutbu'd-Din
- Sultanu'l-A'zam
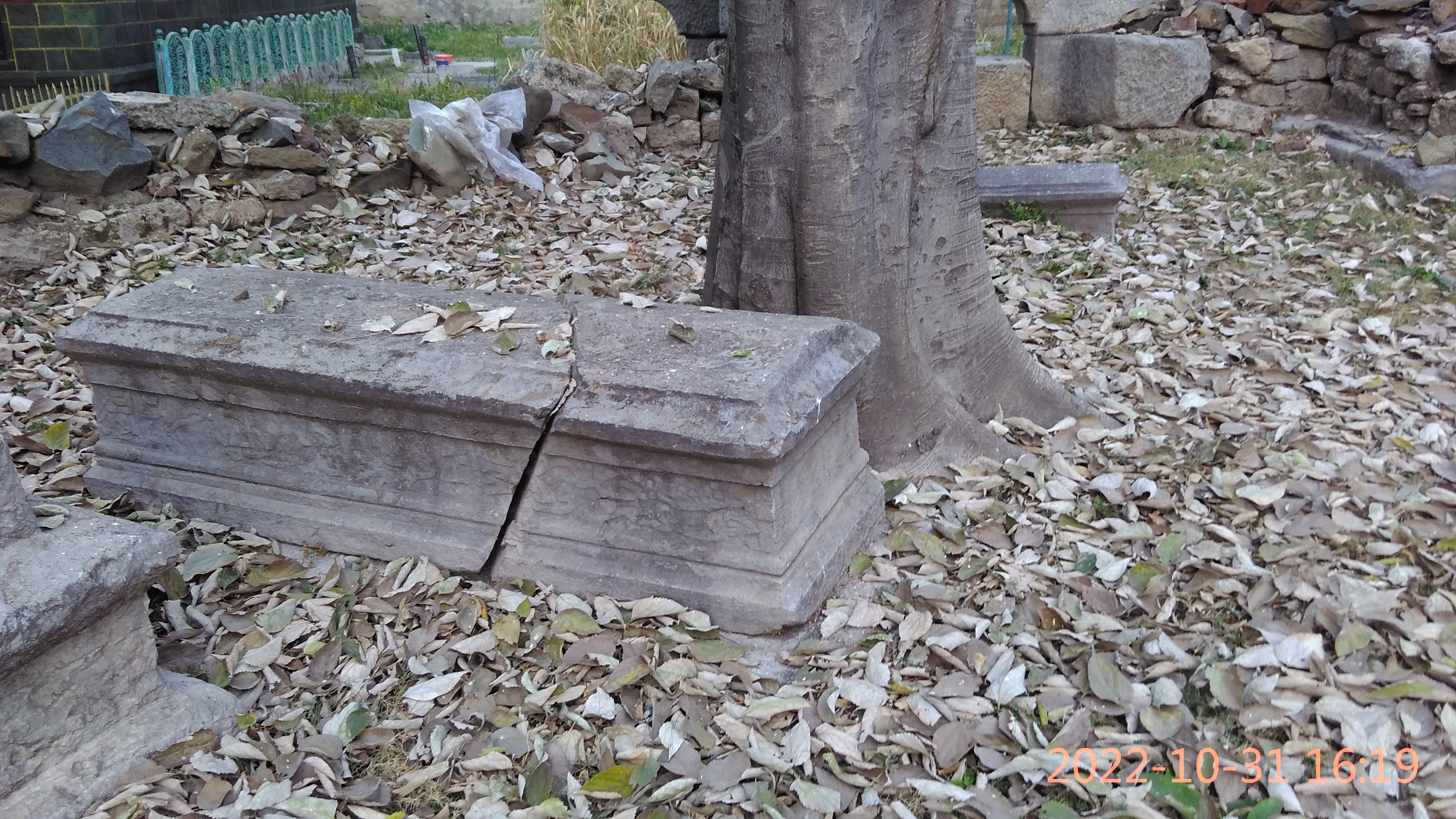
- Grave of Sultan Qutbu'd-Din Shah

6th Sultan of Kashmir
- Reign: 6 June 1373 – 24 August 1389
- Predecessor: Shihabu'd-Din Shah
- Successor: Sikandar Shah
- Died: 24 August 1389; Srinagar, Kashmir Sultanate (present-day Srinagar, Jammu and Kashmir, India)
- Consort: Sura Rani
- Issue: Sikandar Shah; Haibat Khan
Names
- Qutbu'd-Din Shah Miri
- Dynasty: Shah Mir dynasty
- Father: Alau'd-Din Shah
- Religion: Sunni Islam

Qutbu'd-Din Shah Miri (Kashmiri: قُطبُ الدیٖن شاہ میٖری, Persian: قُطُب اُلدِین شَاہ مِیری); reigned 6 June 1373 – 24 August 1389), commonly known as Qutbu'd-Din Shah, born Hindal (lit. The Conqueror of India). was a ruler from the Shah Mir dynasty of Kashmir. He was the sixth Sultan of Kashmir and ruled from 1373 till his death in 1389.
