= Shihabu'd-Din Shah =

Sultan of Kashmir from 1354 to 1373

- Sultan of Kashmir; The Lion's Claw; Badshah

5th Sultan of Kashmir
- Reign: 19 April 1354 – 6 June 1373
- Predecessor: Alau'd-Din Shah
- Successor: Qutbu'd-Din Shah
- Died: 6 June 1373; Srinagar, Kashmir Sultanate (present-day Srinagar, Jammu and Kashmir, India)
- Consort: Rani Lakshmi
- Issue: Hasan Khan; Ali Khan
Names
- Shihabu'd-Din Shah Miri
- Dynasty: Shah Mir dynasty
- Father: Alau'd-Din Shah
- Religion: Sunni Islam

Shihabu'd-Din Shah Miri (Kashmiri and Persian: شهاب الدین شاه میری) commonly known as Sherashamak (شِیراشَامَک The Lion's Claw; reigned 19 April 1354 – 6 June 1373), or simply Shihabu'd-Din Shah, was a ruler from the Shah Mir dynasty based in Kashmir. He was the fifth Sultan of Kashmir who ruled from 1354 to 1373. Shihab is considered to be one of the most powerful kings of Kashmir as his empire extended from Kashgar Ladakh to West Punjab and from Kabul to Chamba.

== Reign ==
Sultan Shihabu’d-din Shah, the fifth Sultan of Kashmir, reigned from 1354 to 1373. Born as (Kashmiri: شِیراشَامَک) meaning "The Lion's Claw". Shihabu’d-din is considered to be one of the most powerful kings of Kashmiri rulers. His rule marked a period of significant expansion, consolidating an empire that stretched from Kashgar, Ladakh to West Punjab and from Kabul to Chamba Under his reign Kashmiri Sultanate reached its greatest territorial extent.

=== Military triumphs ===
==== Conquests ====
As a broad minded intellectual, Shihab'ud-Din, in the first half of his tenure, took care of the Sultanate and brought stability to the social and integral structure of Kashmir. Full of animation and efficiency, Shihab'ud-Din set out to conquer its neighbour polities to expand and glorify his state. Marching through Baramulla, he first occupied Pakhli and went on to add Swat to his realm. Next, he invaded the Khokhar dominated Pothohar, which extended from Attock to Sialkot. His commander-in-chief (Mir Bakhshi), Malik Candra, on the other hand, subdued Jammu, Kishtwar, Chamba, and other hill states. Occupying all the bordering states in the south, Shihab'ud-Din went on to defeat the Dardic forces of Gilgit and the hill states of the north. Baltistan under the Maqpons and Ladakh under the Maryuls were, at that time, tributary states of Moghulistan and Tibet, respectively. Shihab'ud-Din, along with Malik Candra, faced the Baltis and Kashgaris, defeating them easily and soundly. He then moved towards Ladakh, beating the joint forces of Ladakhis and Tibetis. After all these conquests, Shihab'ud-Din returned to Srinagar around 1370 and rather ought to live the rest of his life peacefully but just after some years, in 1373, he died due to a viral illness. One of Sultan Shihabu’d-din's remarkable feats was his victory against the ruler of Kashgar, who invaded Kashmir with a formidable army. Despite numerical inferiority, Shihabu’d-din's strategic prowess led to the defeat of the Kashgar forces. This triumph resulted in the annexation of Ladakh and Baltistan into the Kashmiri rule

=== March towards Delhi ===
Sultan Shihabu’d-din's ambitions extended beyond Kashmir, prompting a march towards Delhi. The confrontation occurred at the banks of the River Satluj against Feroz Shah Tughlaq's army. A peace agreement was reached, stipulating that territories from Sirhind to Kashmir now belonged to the Kashmiri Empire.

=== Administration ===
==== Hindu Courtiers in a Muslim Court ====
An intriguing aspect of Shihabu’d-din's reign was his embrace of diversity. He notably retained Hindu courtiers in his administration, with Kota Bhat and Udyashri being prominent figures. This unusual practice set him apart from his predecessors.
