= Outcome =

Outcome may refer to:

- Outcome (probability), the result of an experiment in probability theory
- Outcome (game theory), the result of players' decisions in game theory
- The Outcome, a 2005 Spanish film
- Outcome (film), a 2026 American film
- An outcome measure (or endpoint) in a clinical trial
- The National Outcomes adopted as targets by the Scottish Government

== See also ==
- Outcome-based education
- Outcomes theory
