= Alauddin Shah =

Sultan of Kashmir (r. 1343–1354)

Alaud'din Shah علاءالدین شاہ
- Sultan of Kashmir; Shah

4th Sultan of Kashmir
- Reign: 6 May 1343 – 19 April 1354
- Coronation: 1347
- Predecessor: Jamshid Shah
- Successor: Shihabu'd-Din Shah
- Died: 1353; Srinagar, Kashmir Sultanate (present-day Srinagar, Jammu and Kashmir, India)
- Burial: Srinagar, Kashmir
- Issue: Shirashamak; Hindal
- Alāu'd-Dīn Shāh Mīrī
- Dynasty: Shah Mir dynasty
- Father: Shamsu'd-Din Shah Mir
- Religion: Sunni Islam

Alau'd-Din Shah Miri (Kashmiri and Persian: علاءالدین شاہ میری) also known as Alau'd-Din Shah, born as Ali Sher, was a ruler from the Shah Mir dynasty of Kashmir. He was the fourth Sultan of Kashmir who ruled from 1343 to 1353.

== Details ==
Sultan Shamsu'd-Din Shah was succeeded by his elder son Sultan Jamshid who ruled for a year and two months. In 1343 CE, Sultan Jamshid suffered a defeat by his brother who ascended the throne as sultan Alauddin in 1347 CE.

Sultan Alauddin ruled from 1343 to 1353. His ruled was generally peaceful.

Sultan Alau'd-Din's two sons became rulers in succession, Sultan Shihabu'd-Din and Sultan Qutbu'd-Din.

== See also ==
- Ali Shah
- Muhammad Shah
