= Shah Mir dynasty =

Muslim dynasty of Kashmir (1339–1561)

- Royal Standard
- Country: Kashmir Sultanate
- Founded: 4 July 1339; 687 years ago
- Founder: Shah Mir
- Final ruler: Habib Shah
- Titles: List: Sultan‐i-Kashmir; Shah; Padishah; Sultan al-Az'am; Budshah; Na'ib Amir al-Mu'minin; Ghazi; Khan; Malik; Amir al-umara; Mirza; Khan-i-Zaman
- Style: Sultan
- Traditions: Kashmiri, Persian, Islamic
- Deposition: 1561

The Shah Mir dynasty (or the House of Shah Mir) ruled the Kashmir Sultanate in the northern Indian subcontinent from 1339 to 1561. The dynasty is named after its founder, Shah Mir.

== Origins ==
Modern scholarship differ on the origins of Shah Mir. However, modern historians generally accept that Shah Mir was from Swāt in Dardistan. Some accounts trace his descent from the rulers of Swāt. (Note: The chronicles include those of Tahir, Haidar Malik, Rafiu'd Din Ahmad and Muhammad A'azam.)

Some scholars based on the statement of Jonaraja, the 15th-century Kashmiri court historian, state that Shah Mir arrived from the Panjgabbar Valley (Panchagahvara), which was populated by Khasa people, and so ascribe a Khasa ethnicity to Shah Mir.

Encyclopaedia of Islam (second edition) suggests a possible Turkish origins. André Wink puts forward the opinion that Shah Mir was possibly of Afghan, Qarauna Turk, or even Tibetan origin, while A. Q. Rafiqi believes that Shah Mir was a descendant of Turkish or Persian immigrants to Swat.

Older sources by contemporary Kashmiri historians, such as Jonaraja, state that Shah Mir was the descendant of Partha (Arjuna) of the ancient Sanskrit epic Mahabharata; Abu ’l-Fadl Allami, Nizam al-Din and Firishta also state that Shah Mir traced his descent to Arjuna, the basis of their account being Jonaraja's Rajatarangini, which Mulla ʽAbd al-Qadir Badayuni translated into Persian at Akbar's orders. This seems to be official genealogy of the Sultanate. Based on this tradition, Aziz Ahmad considers it more probable that Shah Mir was a descendant of a convert from Hinduism only a few generation earlier, probably by a Sufi mystic. According to Walter Slaje, Shah Mir himself may have been the first to become Muslim, and that when he first appeared in Kashmir in 1313, he was treated as a member of nobility.

== History ==
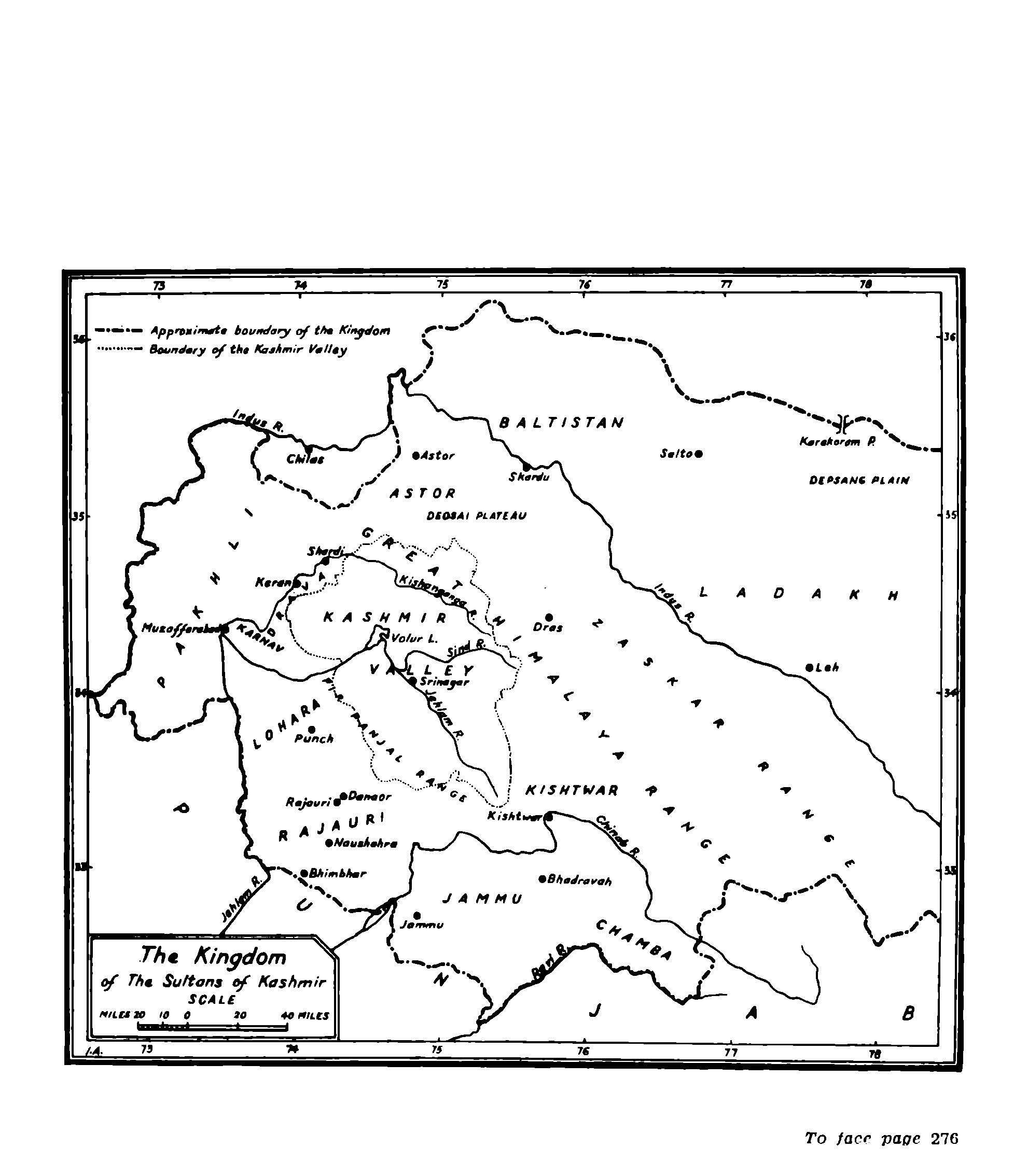
A map of Sultanate of Kashmir

=== Shah Mir ===
A. Q. Rafiqi states:

Shah Mir arrived in Kashmir in 1313 along with his family, during the reign of Suhadeva (1301–1320), whose service he entered. In subsequent years, through his tact and ability Shah Mir rose to prominence and became one of the most important personalities of his time.

Annemarie Schimmel suggests that Shah Mir belonged to a family from Swat which accompanied the sage Mir Sayyid Ali Hamadani, and were associated with the Kubrawiya, a Sufi group active in Kashmir. He worked to establish Islam in Kashmir and was aided by descendants of Shah Mir, especially Sikandar Shah Miri. Shah Mir reigned as Shamsu'd-Din Shah for three years and five months from 1339 to 1342. He was followed by his two sons who became kings in succession.

=== Jamshid ===
Sultan Shah Mir was succeeded by his elder son Sultan Jamshid who ruled for a year and two months. In 1343, Sultan Jamshid suffered a defeat from his brother who ascended the throne as Sultan Alau'd-Din in 1347.

=== Alau'd-Din ===
Sultan Alau'd-Din's two sons became kings in succession, Sultan Shihabu'd-Din and Sultan Qutbu'd-Din.

=== Shihabu'd-Din ===
He was one of the only Shah Miri rulers to keep Hindu courtiers in his court. Prominent among them were Kota Bhat and Udyashri. Ruler of Kashgar in Central Asia attacked Kashmir with a large army during his reign. Despite numerical inferiority, Sultan Shihabu’d-din fought and defeated the army of Kashgar. Sultan also marched towards Delhi, and the army of Feroz Shah Tughlaq opposed him at the banks of Sutlej. After a brief confrontation, a peace treaty concluded between the two with Delhi Sultanate ceding the territories from Sirhind to Kashmir to the Shah Miris.

As a broad minded intellectual, Shihab'ud-Din, in the first half of his tenure, took care of the sultanate and brought stability to the social and integral structure of Kashmir. He also to expand his state. Marching through Baramulla, he first occupied Pakhli and went on to add Swat to his realm. Next, he invaded the Khokhar domains, which extended from Attock to Sialkot. His commander-in-chief (Mir Bakhshi), Malik Candra, on the other hand subdued Jammu, Kishtwar, Chamba, and other hill states. Occupying all the bordering states in the south, Shihab'ud-Din went on to defeat the Dardic forces of Gilgit and the hill states of the north. Baltistan under the Maqpons and Ladakh under the Maryuls were, at that time, tributary states of Moghulistan and Tibet, respectively. Shihab'ud-Din, along with Malik Candra, faced the Baltis and Kashgaris, defeating them easily and soundly. He then moved towards Ladakh, beating the joint forces of Ladakhis and Tibetis. After all these conquests, Shihab'ud-Din returned to Srinagar around 1370 but just after some years, in 1373, he died due to a viral illness.

=== Qutubu'd-Din ===
He succeeded Shihab'ud-Din. The only significant event of his rule was the arrival of Sufi saint Mir Sayyid Ali Hamadani at Kashmir in his reign. In 1380 Qutbud’din died and was succeeded by his son Sultan Sikander, also known as the Sikander Butshikan.

=== Sikandar ===
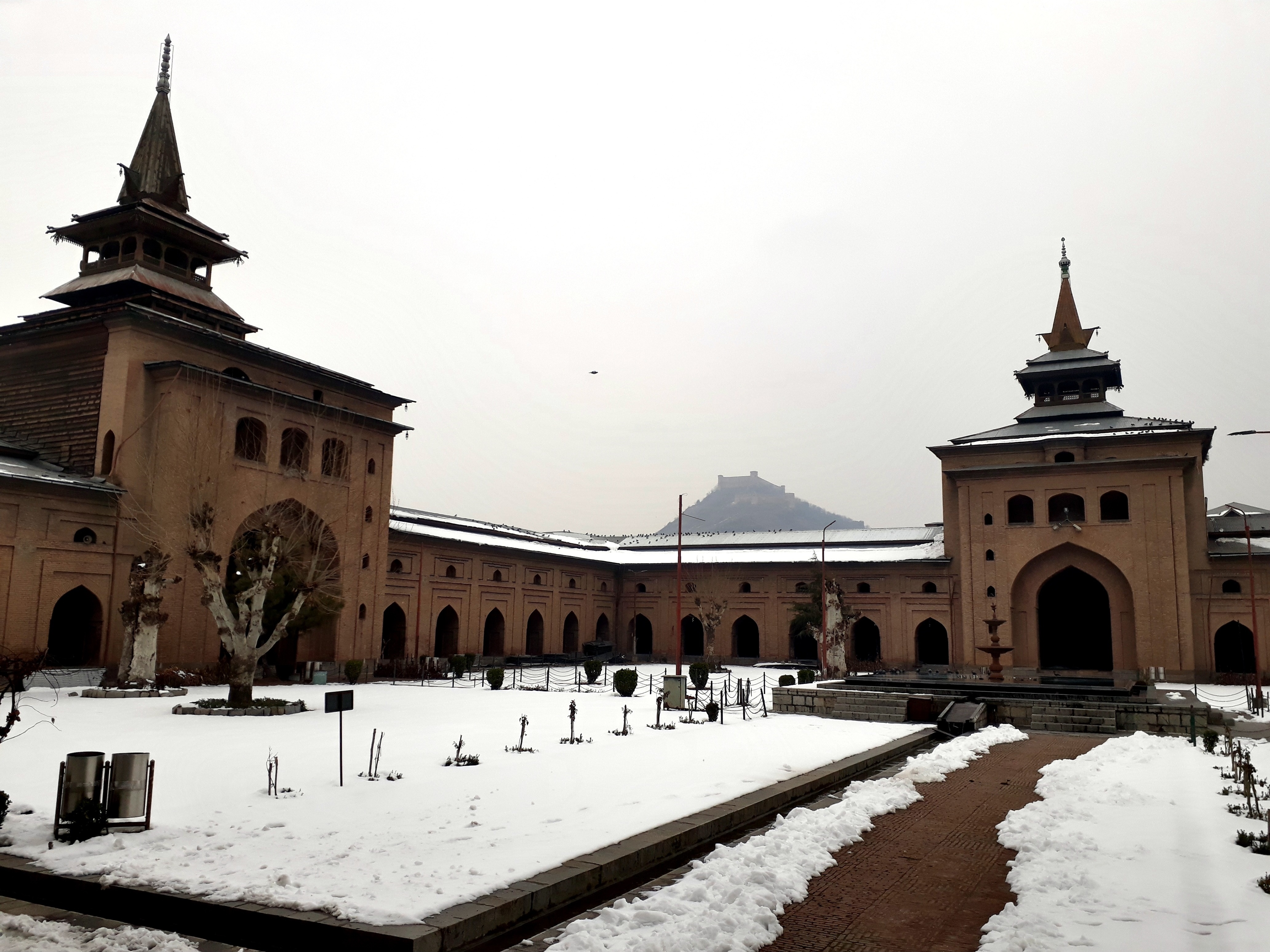
Jamia Masjid of Srinagar. It was built in 1394 by Sikandar Shah Miri.

Sultan Sikandar (1389–1413 CE), was the sixth ruler of the Shah Miri dynasty. Barring a successful invasion of Ladakh, Sikandar did not annex any new territory. Internal rebellions were ably suppressed. A welfare-state was installed — oppressive taxes were abolished, and free schools and hospitals were commissioned. Waqfs were endowed to shrines, mosques were commissioned, numerous Sufi preachers were provided with jagirs and installed in positions of authority, and feasts were regularly held. Economic condition was decent.

Jonaraja and later Muslim chroniclers accuse Sikandar of terminating Kashmir's longstanding syncretic culture by persecuting Pandits and destroying numerous Hindu shrines; Suhabhat — a Brahman neo-convert and Sikandar's Chief Counsel — is particularly blamed for having instigated him. Scholars caution against accepting the allegations at face value and attributing them solely to religious bigotry. His policies, like with the previous Hindu rulers, were likely meant to gain access to the immense wealth controlled by Brahminical institutions; further, Jonaraja's polemics stemmed, at least in part, from his aversion to the slow disintegration of caste society under Islamic influence. However, Sikandar was also the first Kashmiri ruler to convert destroyed temples into Islamic shrines, and such a display of supremacy probably had its origins in religious motivations.

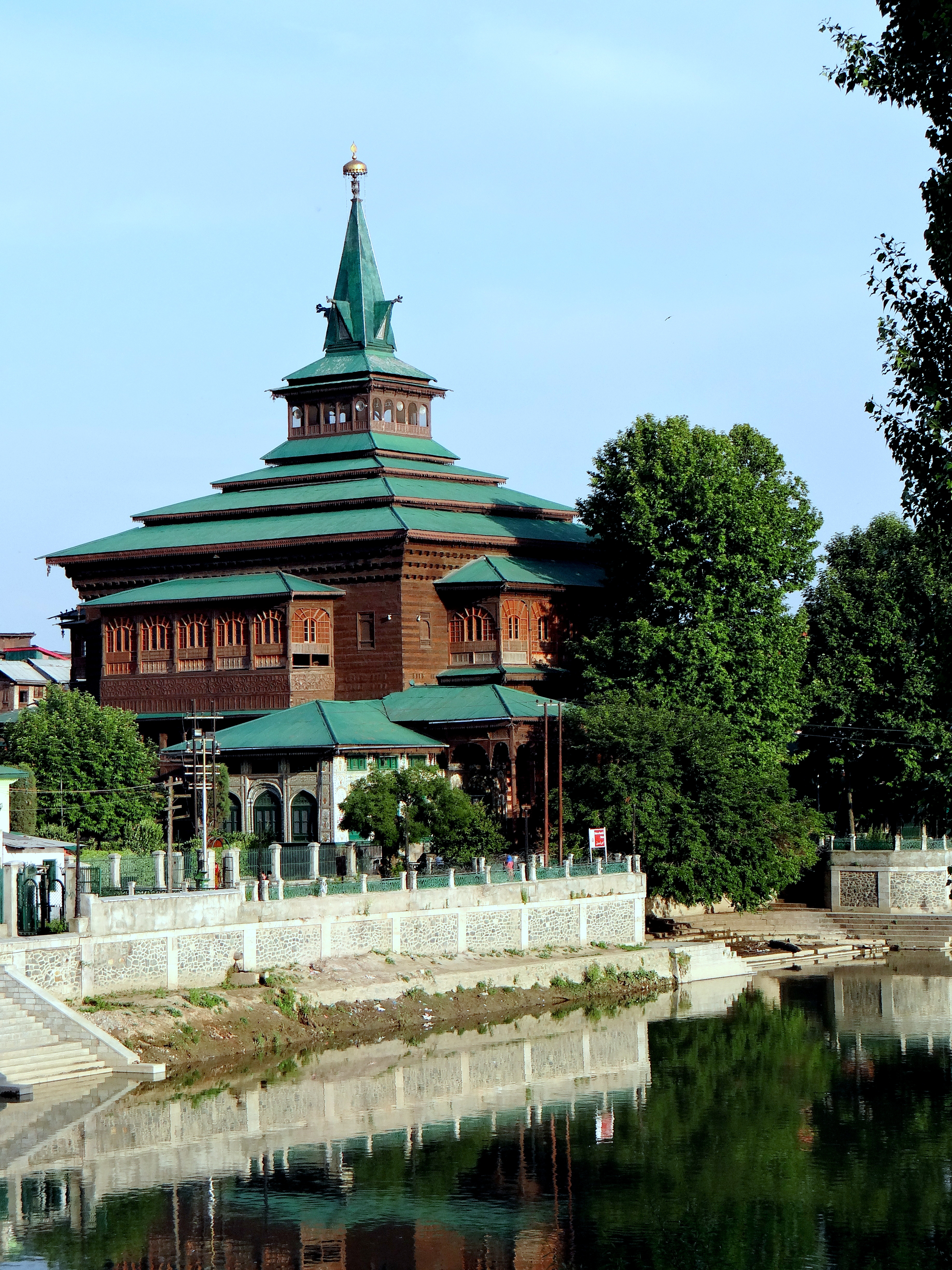
The Khanqah-e-Moula on the banks of Jhelum river, built during reign of Sikandar Shah

Sikandar died in April, 1413 upon which, the eldest son 'Mir' was anointed as the Sultan having adopted the title of Ali Shah.

=== Ali Shah ===
He was the seventh ruler of the Shah Mir dynasty, and reigned between 1413 and 1420. He was defeated by Sultan Zain-ul-Abidin at Thanna with the help of Jasrat, a Khokhar chieftain from Punjab. The fate of Ali Shah is uncertain: he may have died in captivity or have been put to death by the Khokhar.

=== Zain-ul-Abidin ===
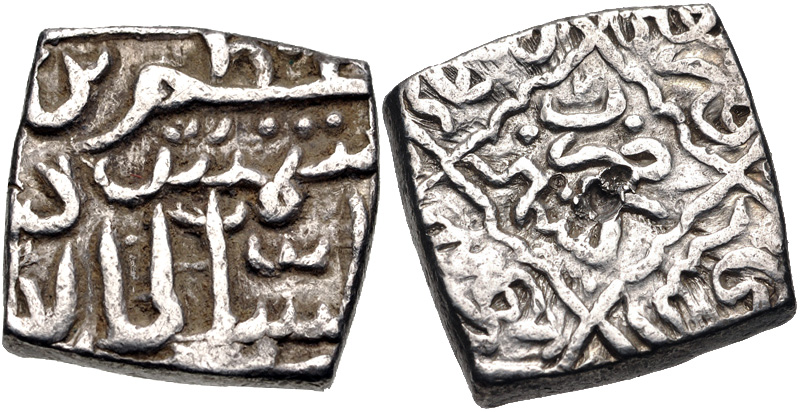
Coin from the reign of Zain-ul-Abidin, dated AH 842 (1438 CE) on reverse. Kashmir mint.

Zain-ul-Abidin was the eighth sultan of Kashmir. He was known by his subjects as Bod Shah or Budshah (lit. 'Great King') and ruled from 1418 to 1470.

Zain-ul-Abidin established a fair rule in Kashmir. He called back the Hindus who had left Kashmir during his father's reign and allowed building of temples. Jizya was also abolished during his reign. From the regulation of commodities to the reviving of old crafts, Zain-ul-Abidin did everything for overall development of Kashmir and his subjects. He revived Kashmir’s industries by inviting Persian and Central-Asian craftsmen who introduced shawl-weaving, carpet-making, silk, wood-carving, and papier-mâché arts. He also promoted paper-making and bookbinding, transforming Kashmir into a centre of fine handicrafts and learning. He launched major public-works and agricultural projects, digging canals such as the Zaingair, building bridges including Zaina Kadal, and founding new settlements like Naushahr (Zainagir). These measures improved irrigation and communication across the valley.

=== Haider Shah ===
Next Sultan of Kashmir was Haji Khan, who succeeded his father Zain-ul-Abidin and took the title of Haider Khan, and ruled from 1470 to 1472.

=== Interruption by Haidar Dughlat ===
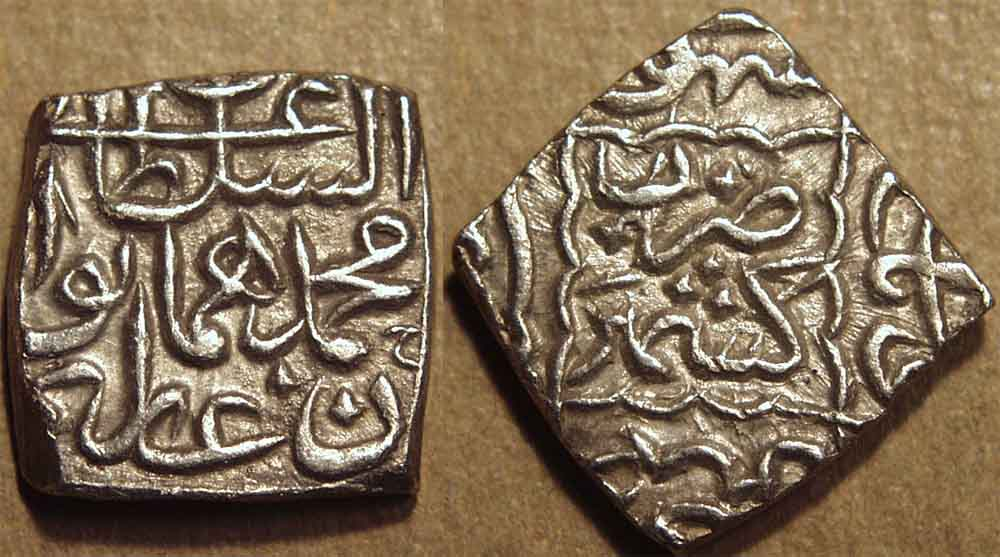
Silver sasnu issued during 1546–50 in Kashmir by Haidar Dughlat, in the name of the Mughal emperor Humayun.

In 1540, the Sultanate was briefly interrupted when Mirza Muhammad Haidar Dughlat, a Chagatai Turco-Mongol military general attacked and occupied Kashmir. Arriving in Kashmir, Haidar installed as sultan by the head of the Sayyid faction, Nazuk. In 1546, after Humayun recovered Kabul, Haidar removed Nazuk Shah and struck coins in the name of the Mughal emperor. He died in 1550 after being killed in battle with the Kashmiris. He lies buried in the Gorstan e Shahi in Srinagar.

== Architecture ==
Some of the architectural projects commissioned by the dynasty in Kashmir include:

- Jamia Masjid in Srinagar, Jammu and Kashmir
- Khanqah-e-Moulah in Srinagar, Jammu and Kashmir
- Aali Masjid in Srinagar, Jammu and Kashmir
- Tomb of the Mother of Zain-ul-Abidin in Srinagar, Jammu and Kashmir
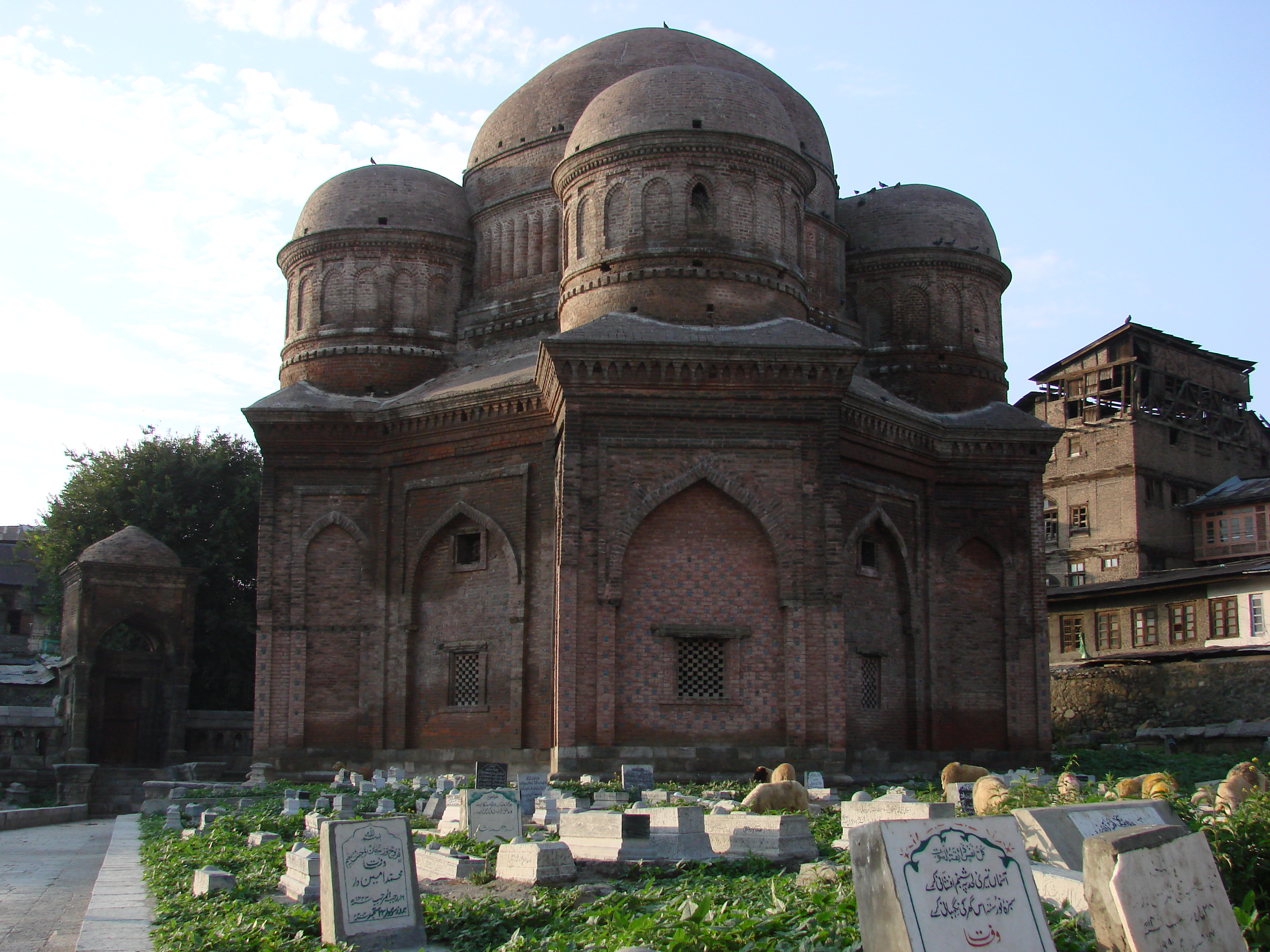
Tomb of the Mother of Zain-ul-Abidin in Srinagar

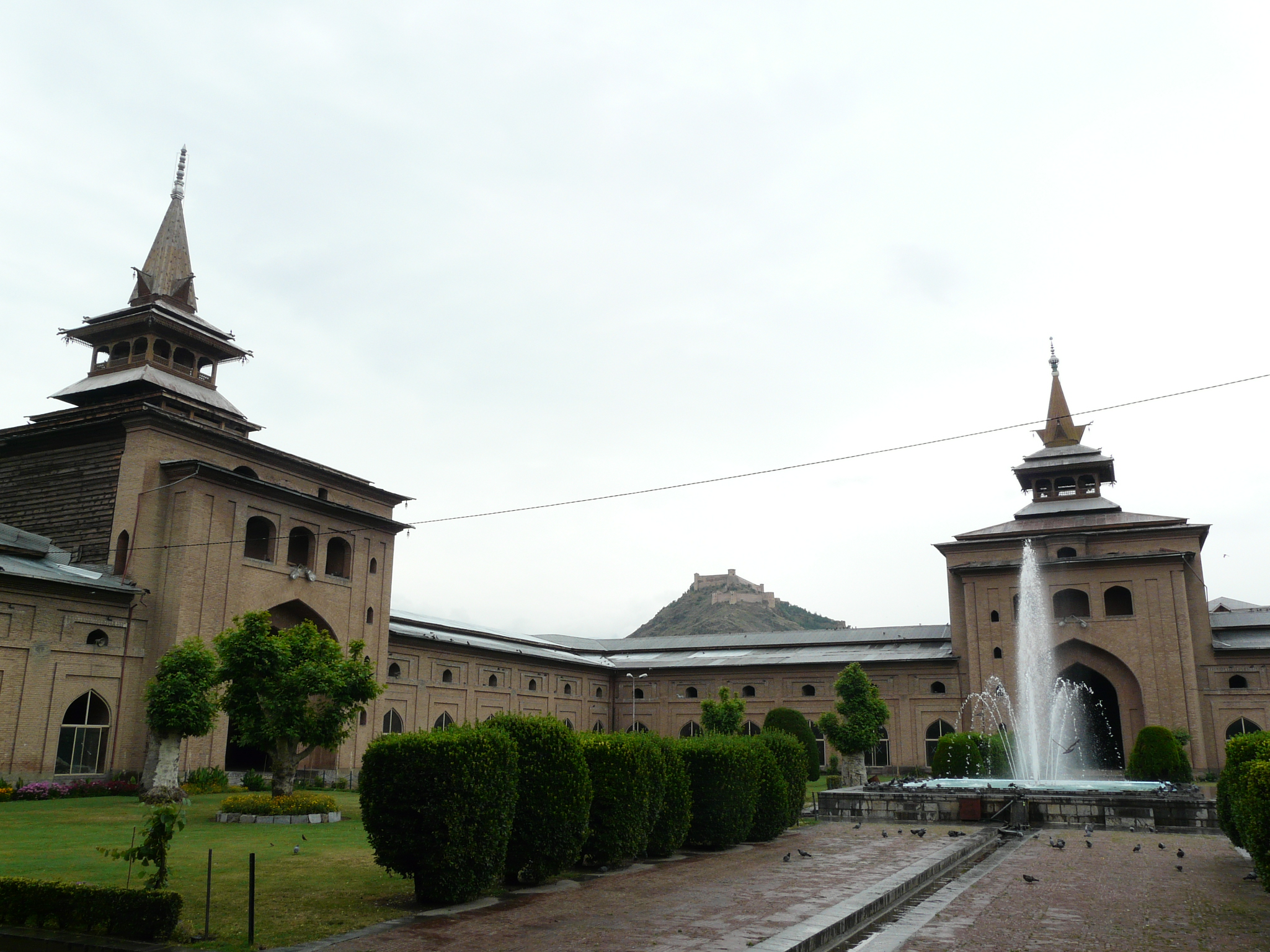
The courtyard of the Jama Masjid, Srinagar. Hari Parbat is visible in the background.

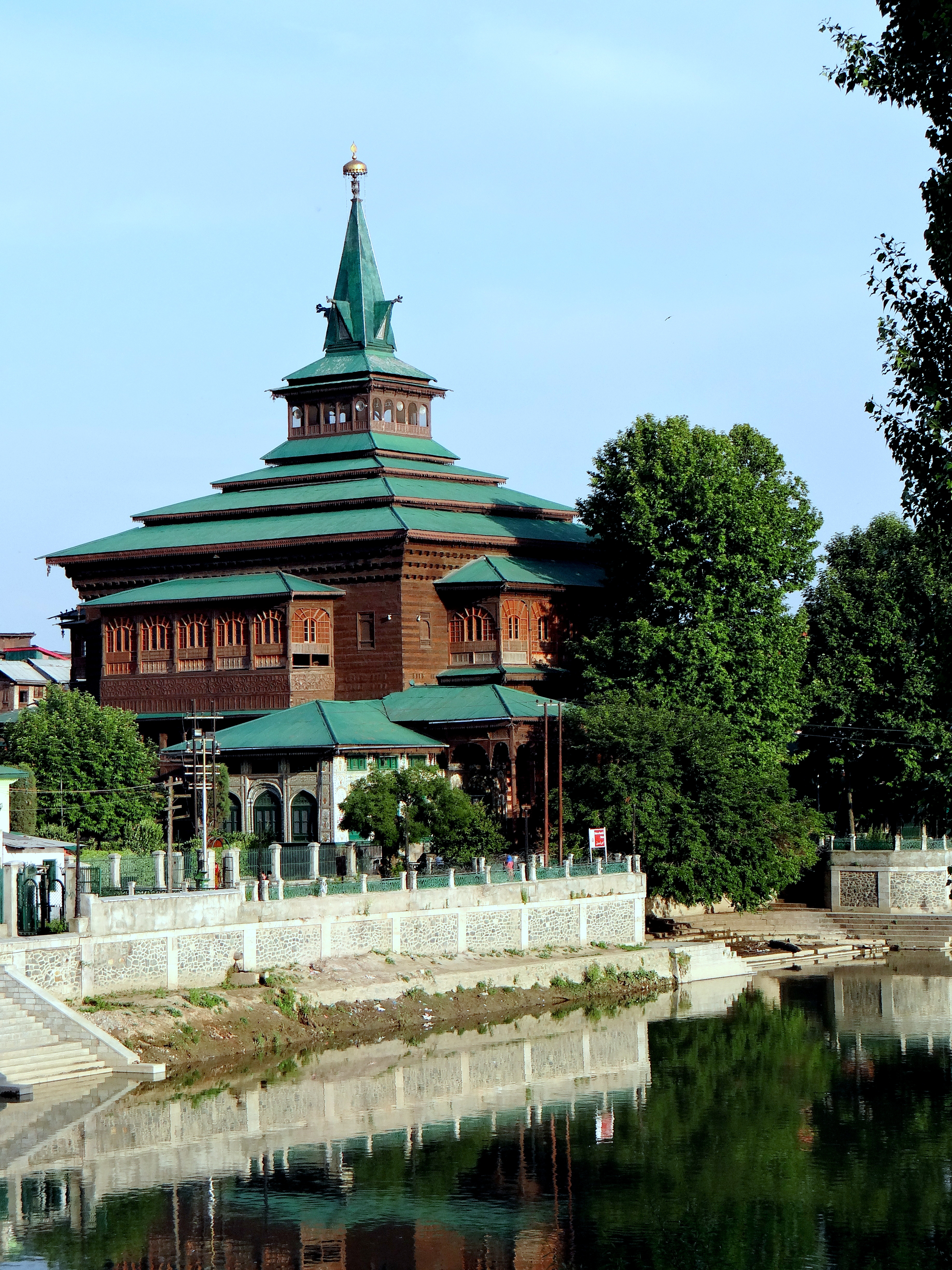
The Khanqah on the banks of Jhelum

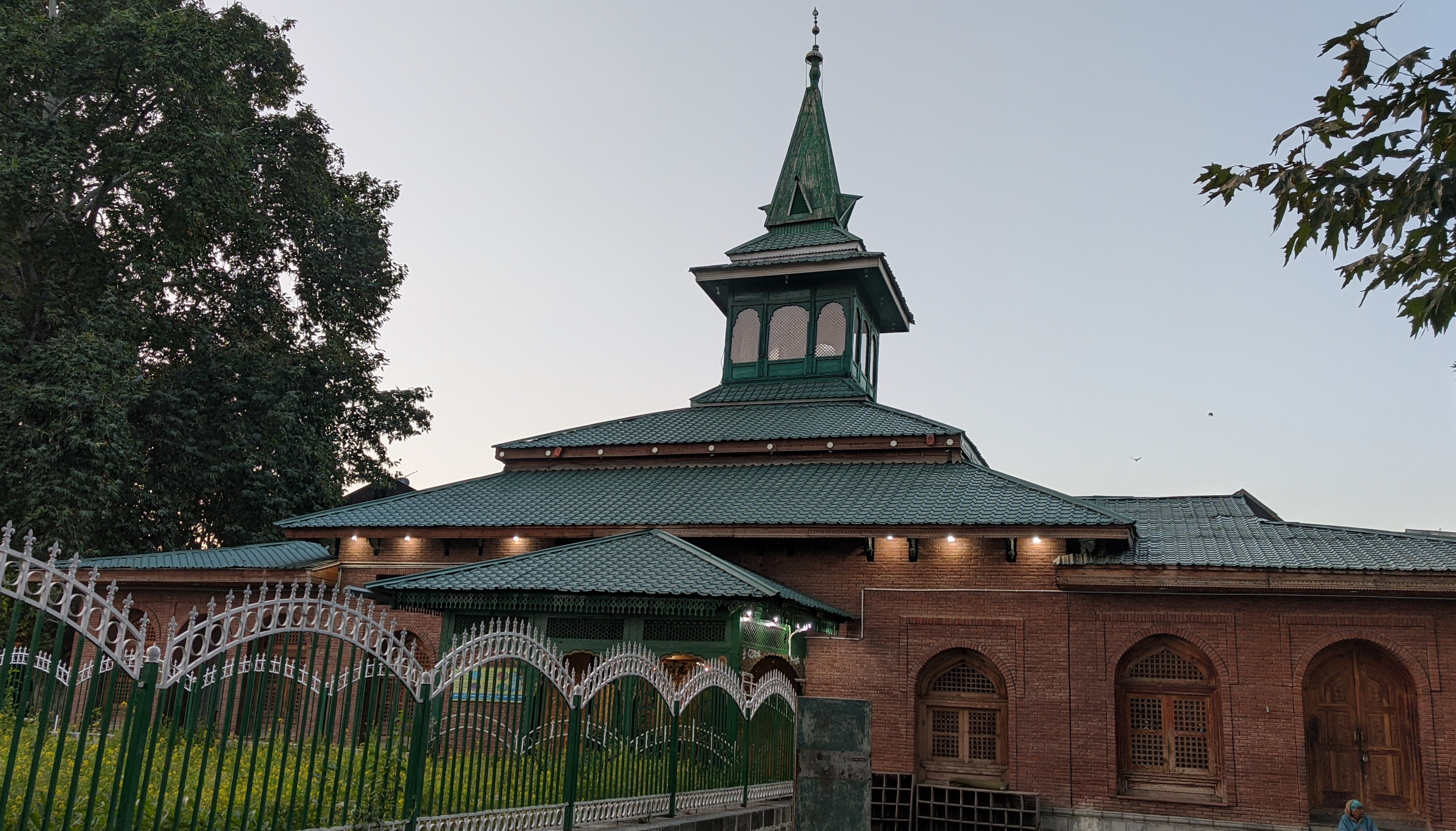
A view of Ziyarat Naqshband Sahab from its yard.

== Reign and successions ==
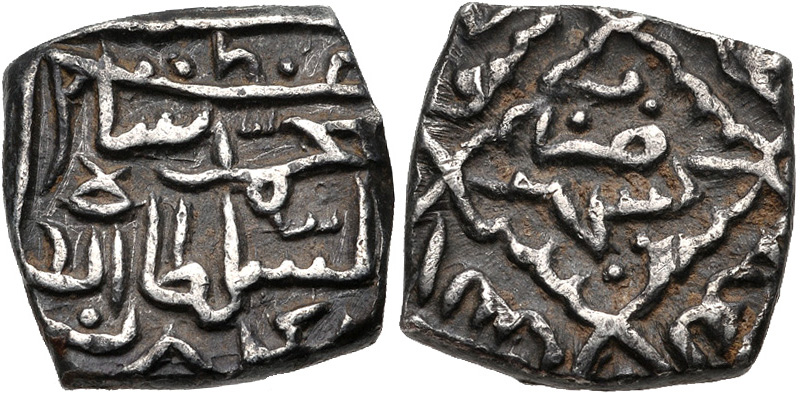
Coinage of Muhammad Shah (r. 1484 CE). Kashmir Sultanate.

The list of Shah Miri sultans of Kashmir is as follows:

No.	Titular Name	Birth Name	Reign
1	Shamsu'd-Dīn Shāh شَمس اُلدِین شَاہ	Shāh Mīr شَاہ مِیر	1339 – 1342
2	Jamshīd Shāh جَمشید شَاہ	Jamshīd جَمشید	1342 – 1342
3	Alāu'd-Dīn Shāh عَلاؤ اُلدِین شَاہ	Alī Shēr عَلی شیر	1343 – 1354
4	Shihābu'd-Dīn Shāh شِہاب اُلدِین شَاہ	Shīrashāmak شِیراشَامَک	1354 – 1373
5	Qutbu'd-Dīn Shāh قُتب اُلدِین شَاہ	Hindāl حِندَال	1373 – 1389
6	Sikandar Shāh سِکَندَر شَاہ	Shingara شِنگَرَہ	1389 – 1412
7	Alī Shāh عَلی شَاہ	Mīr Khān مِیر خَان	1412 – 1418
8	Zainu'l-'Ābidīn زین اُلعَابِدِین	Shāhī Khān شَاہی خَان	1418 – 1419
9	Alī Shāh عَلی شَاہ	Mīr Khān مِیر خَان	1419 – 1420
10	Zainu'l-'Ābidīn زین اُلعَابِدِین	Shāhī Khān شَاہی خَان	1420 – 12 May 1470
11	Haider Shāh حیدِر شَاہ	Hāji Khān حَاجِی خَان	12 May 1470 – 13 April 1472
12	Hasan Shāh حَسَن شَاہ	Hasan Khān حَسَن خَان	13 April 1472 – 19 April 1484
13	Muhammad Shāh مُحَمَد شَاہ	Muhammad Khān مُحَمَد خَان	19 April 1484 – 14 October 1486
14	Fatēh Shāh فَتح شَاہ	Fatēh Khān فَتح خَان	14 October 1486 – July 1493
15	Muhammad Shāh مُحَمَد شَاہ	Muhammad Khān مُحَمَد خَان	July 1493 – 1505
16	Fatēh Shāh فَتح شَاہ	Fatēh Khān فَتح خَان	1505 – 1514
17	Muhammad Shāh مُحَمَد شَاہ	Muhammad Khān مُحَمَد خَان	1514 – September 1515
18	Fatēh Shāh فَتح شَاہ	Fatēh Khān فَتح خَان	September 1515 – August 1517
19	Muhammad Shāh مُحَمَد شَاہ	Muhammad Khān مُحَمَد خَان	August 1517 – January 1528
20	Ibrahīm Shāh اِبرَاہِیم شَاہ	Ibrahīm Khān اِبرَاہِیم خَان	January 1528 – April 1528
21	Nāzuk Shāh نَازُک شَاہ	Nādir Shāh نَادِر شَاہ	April 1528 – June 1530
22	Muhammad Shāh مُحَمَد شَاہ	Muhammad Khān مُحَمَد خَان	June 1530 – July 1537
23	Shamsu'd-Dīn Shāh II شَمس اُلدِین شَاہ دوم	Shamsu'd-Dīn شَمس اُلدِین	July 1537 – 1540
24	Ismaīl Shāh اِسمَاعِیل شَاہ	Ismaīl Khān اِسمَاعِیل خَان	1540 – December 1540
25	Nāzuk Shāh نَازُک شَاہ	Nādir Shāh نَادِر شَاہ	December 1540 – December 1552
26	Ibrahīm Shāh اِبرَاہِیم شَاہ	Ibrahīm Khān اِبرَاہِیم خَان	December 1552 – 1555
27	Ismaīl Shāh اِسمَاعِیل شَاہ	Ismaīl Khān اِسمَاعِیل خَان	1555 – 1557
28	Habīb Shāh حَبِیب شَاہ	Habīb Khān حَبِیب خَان	1557 – 1561

Note: Muhammad Shah had five separate reigns from 1484 to 1537.

== See also ==
- Sikandar Butshikan
- Mir Sayyid Ali Hamadani
- List of Sunni Muslim dynasties
- List of Monarchs of Kashmir
- Mir (clan)
