= Aziz Ahmad (writer) =

Pakistani-Canadian academic (1914–1978)

RSC Aziz Ahmad
- عزیز احمد
- Born: 11 November 1914; Hyderabad, Hyderabad State, British India
- Died: 16 December 1978 (aged 64); Toronto, Canada
- Education: Osmania University
- Writing career
- Language: Urdu

Aziz Ahmad (11 November 1914 in Hyderabad, India – 16 December 1978 in Toronto, Canada) was a Pakistani-Canadian academic who worked as a professor of Islamic studies at the University of Toronto and is best known for his work in Islamic history with a focus on South Asia. In addition, he was a noted Urdu poet, novelist, translator, Iqbal scholar and literary critic.

== Life ==
Aziz Ahmad was born on 11 Nov 1914 in Hyderabad, India. He was educated at the Osmania University, Hyderabad (BA, 1934) and in London (BA Honours, English Literature 1938). From 1938 to 1941, he was a lecturer in the Department of English at Osmania University. In 1941, he entered service for Princess Durr-e-Shahwar as her private secretary. From 1946 to 1948, he was a reader at Osmania University. He spent 9 years thereafter in Pakistan, working for the Department of Advertising, Films and Publications. From 1957 to 1962, he was employed by the London School of Oriental and African Studies as a teacher of Urdu. In 1962, he relocated to the University of Toronto first as an associate professor of Islamic Studies before becoming a full professor in 1968. He died of cancer on 16 Dec 1978 in Toronto.

== Works ==
Apart from Urdu, Ahmad spoke English, French, German, Arabic, Persian, Italian and Turkish fluently and focused on translation early in his career. Later he started writing short stories, of which he would publish five collections, and novels, authoring ten. He penned a number of non-fiction works about history and culture and two books of literary criticism.

== Writing style ==
The Canadian Encyclopedia notes that "Aziz Ahmad's writings, in general, have been very critical of the feudal system and of social injustices resulting in degrading, inhuman exploitation of the underprivileged, oppressed sectors of the society at large." Syed Ehtesham Hussain in Urdu Adab ki Tanqeedi Tareekh (1983) wrote, "Like his short stories, his novels are replete with hide-and-seek with the deity of sex. Almost all characters of his, are overwhelmed by libido. Undoubtedly, he is a master of the art of novel writing. Owing to his knowledge of many European languages, he has been influenced by better European literary styles but his biggest mistake is that he closes his eyes to life's other big issues while analyzing sexual life".

== Significance ==
Ahmad is regarded as an important Urdu short-story writer and novelist. Histories of Urdu literature mention him as a famous and eminent writer of his time. However, Aazam Raahi, in his book on Ahmad, notes that he was not accorded the respect commensurate with his contributions. He writes, "Despite his extraordinary works in research, criticism and fiction, he was ignored by the critics and was not given the honour that he deserved" The Canadian Encyclopedia indicates that his 1946 critical assessment of the Progressive Writers Movement in Urdu, Taraqqi Pasand Adab, "is considered one of the few authentic books on the subject."

== Awards ==
- Fellow, Royal Society of Canada.
- Honorary Degree, University of London.

== Bibliography ==
Novels:

- Hawas (1931)
- Murmur aur Khoon (1932)
- Gurez (1940)
- Aag (1946)
- Aisi Balandi Aisi Pasti (1947). Translated by Ralph Russell as "The shore and the wave" (1971).
- Shabnam (1950)

Short story collections:

- Raqs-e-Natamaam (?)
- Bekaar Din Bekaar Raatein (?)

Other Books:

- Taraqqi Pasand Adab (1946)
- Political History and Institutions of the Early Turkish empire of Dilhi : 1206-1290 A.D. (1949)
- Iqbal Nai Tashkeel (?)
- Islamic law in theory and practice (1956)
- Sayyid Ahmad Khan, Jamal al-din al-Afghani and Muslim India (1960)
- Studies in Islamic Culture in the Indian Environment (1964)
- Islamic Modernism in India and Pakistan 1857–1964 (1967)
- An Intellectual History of Islam in India (1969)
- Muslim Self-statement in India and Pakistan : 1857-1968 (1970)
- Religion and Society in Pakistan (1971)
- A History of Islamic Sicily (1975)

Edited Volumes:

- Intekhab-e-Jadeed (in collaboration with Aal-e-Ahmad Suroor) (1943). It is an anthology of selected Urdu poetry from 1914 to 1942.
