= Bulbul Shah =

14th c. Sufi missionary to Kashmir

Syed Sharf-Ud-Din Abdul Rehman Shah
- سيد شرف الدين عبد الرحمن شاه
- Title: Bulbul Shah

Personal life
- Born: 13th-century Turkestan
- Died: 1327 (727 AH) Srinagar, Kashmir Valley
- Home town: Turkestan
- Known for: Islamic Missionary

Religious life
- Religion: Islam
- Denomination: Sunni
- School: Hanafi
- Tariqa: Suharwardiyya
- Creed: Maturidi

Syed Sharf-Ud-Din Abdul Rehman Shah, (Note: Persian: سيد شرف الدين عبد الرحمن شاه) popularly known as Bulbul Shah, (Note: Persian: بلبل شاه) was a 14th-century Uyghur Sufi associated with the Suhrawardi order. He is traditionally credited with introducing Islam to Kashmir through the conversion of the Kashmiri ruler Rinchan Shah, who later adopted the name Sadruddin Shah.

Bulbul Shah is reported to have been a disciple of Mir Syed Niymatullah, who is said to have directed him to undertake Islamic missionary activity to Kashmir. References to his life and role appear in works such as Asrar-ul-Abrar by Baba Dawood Mishkati and Nawadir-ul-Akhbar by Rafi-ud-Din.

== Early life and spiritual training ==
Bulbul Shah, was born into a Uyghur Muslim family, in 13th-century. He was associated with the Suhrawardiyya order of Sufism. Sources differ on his exact place and date of birth, but accounts consistently link him to the cultural and religious traditions of Central Asia. He is said to have shown an early inclination toward spirituality, which led him to pursue the study of Islamic mysticism under established Sufi masters.

Bulbul Shah studied Sufism under prominent teachers, including Shahabuddin Suhrawardi and Syed Shah Niyamatullah. Following the guidance of his spiritual mentors, he embarked on missionary activity, with the objective of propagating Islam through Sufi teachings and practice. According to historical accounts, he entered Kashmir around 1302 CE on what he regarded as a spiritual command.

== Missionary activity in Kashmir ==
Bulbul Shah is traditionally credited with introducing Islam to Kashmir during the reign of King Suhadeva in the early 14th century. He is said to have converted Rinchan, a Ladakhi Buddhist ruler who had seized power in Kashmir and later adopted the name Sadruddin Shah after embracing Islam. Under Sadruddin’s patronage, Bulbul Shah established a khanqah (Sufi hospice) and a mosque, regarded as the first such institutions in Kashmir. His shrine, located in Srinagar’s old city, became a centre of spiritual devotion and continues to attract pilgrims.

Several hagiographical traditions are associated with his life. One account narrates that while performing ablution on the banks of the Jhelum River, Bulbul Shah witnessed a nightingale (Persian: بلبل, romanized: bulbul). His disciples interpreted the bird’s flight and disappearance as a symbol of his soul’s spiritual ascent. Following this, he is said to have demonstrated a mystical experience to a follower, leading to his being popularly known as “Bulbul Shah.”

Religious leaders and community members often regard his arrival, along with that of Mir Syed Ali Hamadani later in the century, as a significant milestone in Kashmir's spiritual and cultural history.

== Death and legacy ==
Bulbul Shah died in 1327 CE (726 AH) and was buried near his khanqah in Srinagar, on the banks of the Jhelum River. The site, which had originally served as a langar (community kitchen), developed into a shrine that has since remained an important place of devotion. Annual commemorations are held there on 7th Rajab, attracting large gatherings of devotees, scholars, and political figures.

In 2011, the Archaeological Survey of India rejected a proposal to designate the shrine as a national monument, despite a High Court directive ordering its consideration. A contempt petition was subsequently filed by petitioner G. A. Lone against the official respondents, leading the High Court to direct the Jammu and Kashmir Chief Secretary, the Director of Archives, and others to submit a compliance report.

== See also ==
- Abdul Qadir Gilani
- Mir Sayyid Ali Hamadani
- Nund Rishi
- Hamza Makhdoom
