= Rinchan =

Sultan of Kashmir from 1320 to 1323

Rinchan Shah

Sultan of Kashmir (Note: Rinchan embraced Islam in December 1320)
- Reign: December 1320 – 25 November 1323
- Predecessor: himself (as Maharaja of Kashmir)
- Successor: Udayānadeva (as Maharaja of Kashmir); Shamsu'd-Din Shah (as Sultan of Kashmir)

Maharaja of Kashmir
- Reign: 13 November 1320 – December 1320
- Predecessor: Sūhadeva
- Successor: himself (as Sultan of Kashmir)
- Died: 25 November 1323; Srinagar, Kashmir Sultanate (present-day Srinagar, Jammu and Kashmir, India)
- Spouse: Kota Rani
- Issue: Haidar Khan
Regnal name
- Al-Sultān Sadr al-Dunyā Wa'l-Dīn Rinchan Shāh
- House: Maryul
- Religion: Sunni Islam (Note: School of Jurisprudence: Hanafi) (1320 onwards); Tibetan Buddhism (Note: Tradition: Kadampa) (until 1320)

Sadr al-Din Rinchan Shah (Kashmiri: رِنژھن شاہ, Persian: رِنچَن شَاہ; died 25 November 1323), born as Lhachen Rinchan Bhoti, was the founder and the first sultan of the Sultanate of Kashmir from 1320 to 1323. Originally said to have been a Ladakhi Buddhist, he converted to Islam, becoming the first Muslim ruler of Kashmir.

== Early life ==
Little is known about the antecedents of Rinchan. While Baharistan-i-shahi (BIS) claims him to have arrived from "Tibet", Jonaraja says that he was a Ladakhi nobleman of Buddhist faith whose father and other relatives were treacherously murdered at the hands of Kalamanya (probably a Balti) clan. Rinchan took his revenge by feigning to make peace with the Kalamanyas, lured them unarmed to drink the chalice at a river-bank and had them murdered with a hidden axe. Despite this success, there were ample adversaries left in Ladakh, and he chose to ply his trade in northern Kashmir.

== Ascension ==
Rinchan was allowed to reside at Gaganagiri by Ramchandra, governor of Lahara and began to ascend the hierarchy of power; Suhadeva allowed this with the aim of keeping Ramchandra in check. Before long, Rinchan had gained tremendous wealth by selling off Kashmiris as slaves to Ladakh — this trade ran in parallel to Qadr's depredations and did not draw any imperial response. By the time, Qadr decided to return (Jonaraja blames the impending winters whereas BIS blames the lack of food), Kashmir was in a state of total ruin with the elites dead or distant; Suhadeva lacked popular legitimacy and Rinchan had his eyes set on the throne.

That the people were allowed to form armed groups to ward off robbers etc. helped Rinchan; he utilized the loopholes to raise a group of faithful soldiers in Lahar. However, Ramchandra proved to be a hard obstacle to his machinations and Rinchan had him assassinated by sneaking in fellow Ladakhis into Lahara Fort as cloth-merchants over the course of days. The fort was seized, his relatives imprisoned, and Kota — the daughter of Ramchandra — married to Rinchan himself, by force.

Around 1320, an invader named "Da'lacha" — mentioned by the 15th century Kashmiri chronicler Jonaraja as the commander of "Karmasena" — invaded Kashmir with heavy cavalry. Baharistan-i-shahi (BIS), a 17th century chronicle of Kashmir written by an anonymous author, notes him to be a Turko-Mongol raider; the name is given as "Zulchu" or "Zulju".

Jonaraja notes that Suhadeva, then ruler of Kashmir, received him with all honors; he sought to pay his way out of a conflict and levied new taxes on all subjects. This did not go down well with the Brahmins who threatened to fast until death, bringing Suhadeva's plans to an end and spurring the inevitable. (Note: In Dharmashastra cannon, Brahmins are exempted from being levied with taxes.) In contrast, BIS does not mention any negotiation—the sole aim was said to be to massacre Kashmiris and gain wealth. Suhadev tried to resist Zulju's invasion but was unsuccessful. He ultimately fled, leaving the people at the mercy of the Mongols, who committed attrocities on them. After about 8 months when Julju returned back, there was a power vacuum in Kashmir, which was exploited by Rinchan.

According to Jonaraja, there was none left to oppose Rinchan's rise to power, Suhadeva fled Kashmir; however, BIS notes of a battle where Suhadeva was defeated.

== Rule and conversion ==
Both Jonaraja and BIS commend Rinchan to be a kind and just ruler. The rule of law was sacrosanct for everybody irrespective of closeness to the King and his sagacious ways led subjects to believe that the Golden Age of Kashmir had been restored. (Note: Both the sources mention the same incident about him resolving an (apparently) intractable dispute in an ingenious way.) Shah Mir was appointed as the prime minister.

Jonaraja notes that soon after his ascension, Rinchan had sought initiation into Śaivism, the predominant religious denomination of Kashmir, but the Devasmamin (the priest) felt him to be unworthy. Jonaraja does not discuss the religious aspects of Rinchan any further but given the Islamic names of his son, it is obvious that he had converted to Islam sometime later. According to BIS, Rinchan was confused about his religious conversion, with both Hindus and Muslims beseeching him to join their faith to the extent of engaging in theological debates. Eventually, one morning he saw Bulbul Shah — an Uyghur Sufi missionary of the Ni'matullah Order — and was taken in by his devotion as well as preaching; thus, he became the first ruler of the Kashmir Valley to embrace Islam.

In the meanwhile, Udayandeva — a member of the erstwhile nobility, who had fled to Gandhara on the heels of a failed negotiation with Qadr — scoped for opportunities to usurp the throne. He is said to have instigated Takka, whose brother Timi was earlier executed by Rinchan for having drunk stolen milk, into a rebellion; Udayandeva particularly emphasized how Rinchan cared about nothing but fame and how Takka was kept in the sidelines of Rinchan's administration unlike Vyala.

Subsequently, Rinchan was sworded in the royal palace and the conspirators, taking him for dead, planned to seize the city. In reality, Rinchan was seriously injured but not dead; he stood up once they were at a distance. Despite spotting this, no one bothered to have him overpowered but fought among themselves about who was to blame for not pulling off the assassination. Eventually, Rinchan staked the assassins and massacred their families to the extent of disemboweling pregnant women. The rebellion was suppressed ruthlessly but the injuries inflicted a chronic headache.

=== Art and Architecture ===
Rinchan built a khanqah in Shah's honor near his palace and even commissioned a jagir. He also constructed the Baed Masheed (lit. Big Mosque). (Note: BIS reports that the original structure caught fire and was replaced with a smaller structure at an unknown date.) Jonaraja also constructed the fortification of Rinchanpora.

== Death ==
The winters of 1323 worsened Rinchan's headache; he never recovered and died on 25 November. His remains remain interred near Bud Masheed — the tomb was discovered by archaeologist A. H. Francke in 1909 and reconstructed by Kashmiri Government in 1990. He had a son, Haidar Khan, by his queen Kota, whom he entrusted to the care of Shah Mir.

Shah Mir would later imprison Haider along with Kota Rani, establishing the Shah Mir dynasty.
