= Kota Rani =

Last Queen of Kashmir

Maharani of Kashmir
- Reign: 1338 − July 1339
- Predecessor: Udayānadeva
- Successor: Position abolished Shah Mir (as Sultan of Kashmir)

Regent of Kashmir
- Regency: 1323 − 1338
- Monarch: Udayānadeva
- Died: 1344; Srinagar, Kashmir Sultanate (Srinagar, Jammu and Kashmir, India)
- Spouse: Sūhadeva; Rinchan; Udayānadeva
- Children: Haidar Khan; Second son (son of Udayanadeva)
- House: Lohara dynasty
- Father: Rāmachandra
- Religion: Hinduism

Kota Rani (died 1344) was the final ruler of the Hindu Lohara dynasty in Kashmir. She was also the last female ruler of Kashmir. She acted as regent for her son during his minority from 1323 to 1338 and ruled as monarch from 1338 to 1339. She was deposed by Shah Mir, the second Muslim ruler of Kashmir after Rinchan, who had converted to Islam and ruled as Sultan Sadr-ud-din.

== Life ==
Kota Rani was the daughter of Ramachandra, the commander-in-chief of Suhadeva, the king of Lohara dynasty in Kashmir.

When in 1320 a Mongol army led by one Zulju invaded Kashmir, Suhadeva tried to resist the Mongols. However, he failed to stop the invasion and fled. After about 8 months when the Mongols were satisfied with their looting, they returned, leaving a power vacuum in Kashmir. This vacuum was filled by Rinchan (a Ladakhi), an administrator who had been appointed earlier by Ramachandra. He sent a force to the fort, in the guise of merchants, who took Ramachandra's men by surprise. Ramachandra was killed and his family was taken prisoner.

To earn local support, Rinchan appointed Rawanchandra, the son of Ramachandra, as administrator of Lar and Ladakh, and married his sister Kota Rani. He employed Shah Mir as a trusted courtier, who had entered Kashmir earlier and had been given an appointment in the government. Rinchan converted to Islam and adopted the name of Sultan Sadruddin. In 1323, he died as a result of an assassination after ruling for three years.

=== Rule ===
Kota Rani was first appointed as a regent for Rinchan's young son. Later, on the advice of the nobles and elders that without a sovereign the kingdom might lapse into anarchy, she recalled Udayanadeva, the brother of Suhadeva, and married him.

Udayanadeva became the ruler of Kashmir, but was cowardly and incompetent. Soon after Udayanadeva ascended the throne, Kashmir faced a major Turkish invasion via Hirapir. Terrified, he fled to Ladakh, but Kota Rani took charge. With support from key officers like Rawancandra, Shah Mir, and Bhatta Bhiksana, she organized resistance.

She urged local chiefs—who had turned independent—to unite against the invaders, warning that disunity had earlier led to disaster during Zulji invasion of Kashmir. Emphasizing courage over cowardice, she called on them to defend their land and people.

Her appeal succeeded: the chiefs rallied, the campaign was fought vigorously, and the Turks were defeated and forced to withdraw. Afterward, Udayanadeva returned to Srinagar, but his flight had damaged his reputation, leaving Kota Rani as the true authority in the kingdom.

After Udayanadeva died in 1338, Kota Rani became the ruler of Kashmir in her own right.

Kota Rani had two sons. Rinchan's son was under the charge of Shah Mir and Udayanadeva's son was taught by Bhatta Bhikshana. Wary of Shah Mir's rising popularity, Kota Rani appointed Bhatta Bhikshana as her prime minister, which angered Shah Mir, who decided to overthrow Kota Rani.

Shah Mir pretended to be sick, and when Bhatta Bhikshana visited him, Shah Mir jumped out of his bed and killed him. Thereafter, he asked her to marry him and share power with him, but she refused. Further angered, he set out with an army and laid siege to Andarkot, where she had retreated. After many of her soldiers deserted her and joined Shah Mir, she surrendered and was taken prisoner along with her two sons. She died in prison, in 1339.

== Legacy ==
She was considered an intelligent and great thinker. She saved the city of Srinagar from frequent floods with the construction of a canal, named "Kute Kol" after her. This canal gets water from Jhelum River at the entry point of city and again merges with Jhelum river beyond the city limits.

== In popular culture ==
- Rakesh Kaul's historical novel The Last Queen of Kashmir is based on Kota Rani's life and legend.
- In August 2019, Reliance Entertainment and Phantom Films announced that they would be making a movie on Kota Rani.

== See also ==
- Rajatarangini
- Sayyid Dynasty
- Razia Sultana
- Queen Didda
- Rinchan

== Bibliography ==
- Hasan, Mohibbul (1959). Kashmir under the Sultans. Aakar Books. ISBN 978-81-87879-49-7.
