= Dardistan =

Region in South Asia

Dardistan (داردستان) refers to the linguistic area where Dardic languages are spoken. The region also includes many non-Dardic peoples and languages. The legitimacy of the term has been questioned.

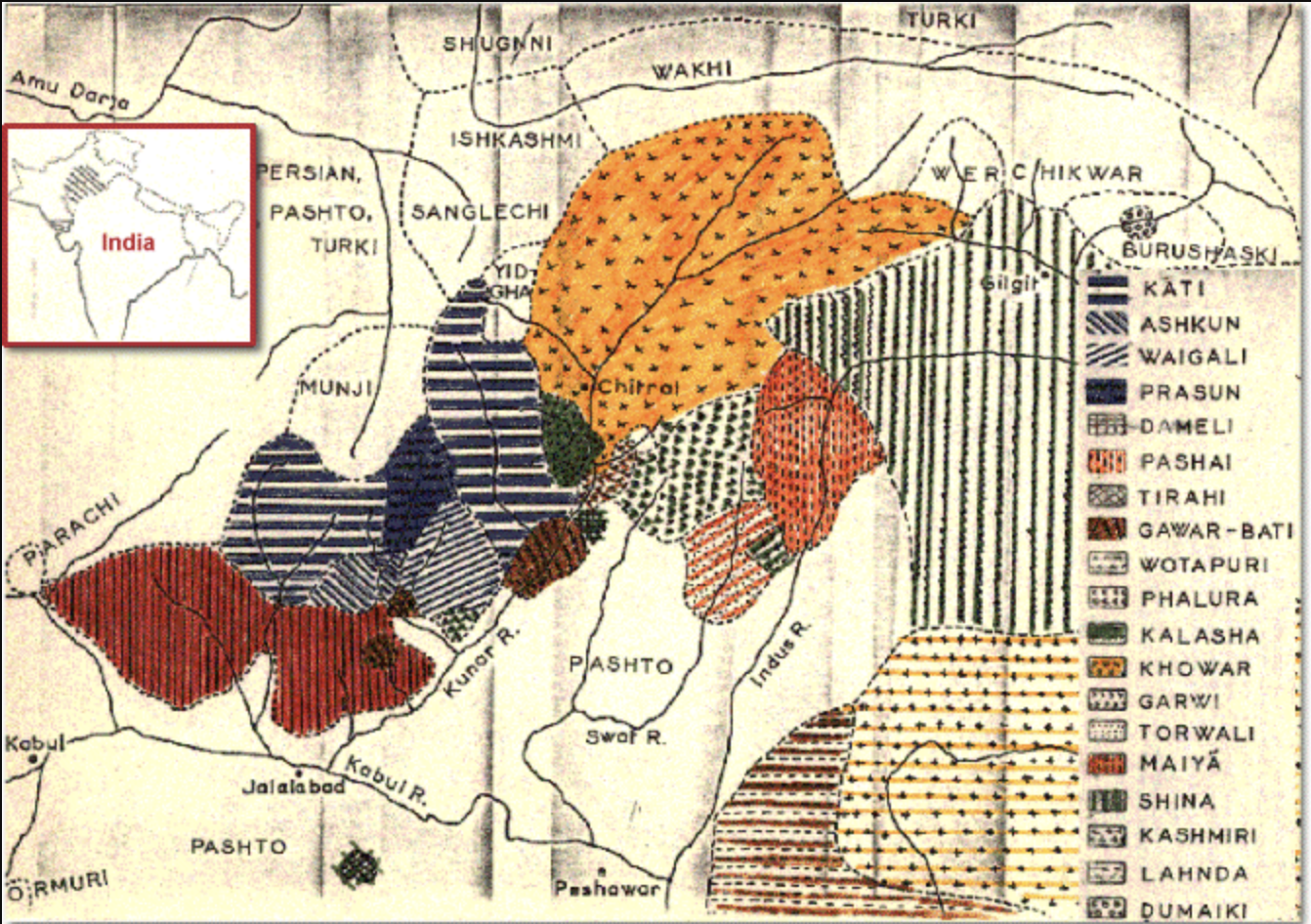
Dardic languages by Georg Morgenstierne (Note: Nuristani languages such as Kamkata-vari (Kati), Kalasha-ala (Waigali), etc. are now separated)

== History ==
The 19th-century Hungarian-born British orientalist Gottlieb Wilhelm Leitner is generally credited with coining the term Dardistan. Leitner traced the first reference to "the country of the Dards" to the writings of the Greek historian and geographer Herodotus, who placed it on the frontier of Kashmir near Afghanistan. However, some scholars, such as Wolfgang Holzwarth, note that a Persian chronicle, Tarikh-i-Badakhshan (written in 1810), describes Chitral as part of Dardistan long before him, and that the term Dard, at least as an exonym, had also been used sporadically in the region.

The British initially grouped almost all the people and languages of the upper Indus River, between Kashmir and Kabul, into a single category. This led to the creation of distinct identities for all other groups in the region, giving rise to terms such as Dard, Dardistan, and Dardic.

However, the names Dards and Dardistan are not common in the region. Dard is not recognized in any local language, except Khowar, where it translates to 'way of the language' or 'dialect'. The broad application of this term has been criticised by many scholars. The languages and peoples are often referred to as "Kohistani", mostly by the Pashtuns. In academic linguistic contexts, however, Kohistani refers to a subgroup of Dardic languages mainly spoken in the Kohistan district of Khyber Pakhtunkhwa.

In a historical context, Herodotus (4th century B.C.), in one of his stories, mentioned warring people named Dadikai on India's frontier. Later, Strabo and Pliny referred to the warlike tribe known as Dardae. Alexander, whose journeys contribute significantly to the classical geography of the subcontinent, did not encounter any Dard people. However, he did visit a place called Daedala, where he reportedly fought a group known as the Assakenoi.

Herodotus' Dadikai appears to be the Persian name for the Daradas mentioned in the Puranic sources. Rather than identifying a specific group, the term described a fierce population living in the northwest, beyond the confines of established society. In Rajatarangini, Kalhana refers to the Darads as inhabitants of the area north of Kashmir, known for their frequent attempts to invade and plunder Kashmir.

The term eventually gained acceptance through frequent use. GW Leitner introduced the labels 'Dard' and 'Dardistan' even though no local population identified as 'Dard'. John Biddulph, who resided in Gilgit for an extended period, also noted that none of the tribes typically referred to as 'Dard' recognized the term. Biddulph acknowledged that Leitner's label 'Dardistan' was based on a misunderstanding, but he accepted it as a useful term for referring to the complex, diverse, and largely unexplored Karakoram region between Kashmir and the Hindu Kush. This usage mirrors Sanskrit interpretation, where it refers to unspecified fierce outsiders residing in the mountainous regions beyond the area's borders.
