= Qalandariyya =

Unorthodox Sufi mystical order

The Qalandariyya (Arabic: قلندرية), is a sufi spiritual order associated with the Qalandar, a title used in Islamic mysticism. Emerging in the medieval Islamic world, the Qalandariyya became associated with a small number of prominent mystics and ascetics across different historical periods, including Huzoor Makki Qalandar (Sahabi-e Rasool), Rabia al-Basri, Lal Shahbaz Qalandar, Bu Ali Shah Qalandar, Khawaja Emaduddin Qalandar Badshah, and more recently Qalandar Baba Auliya, whose influence extended across Persia, Central Asia, and South Asia.

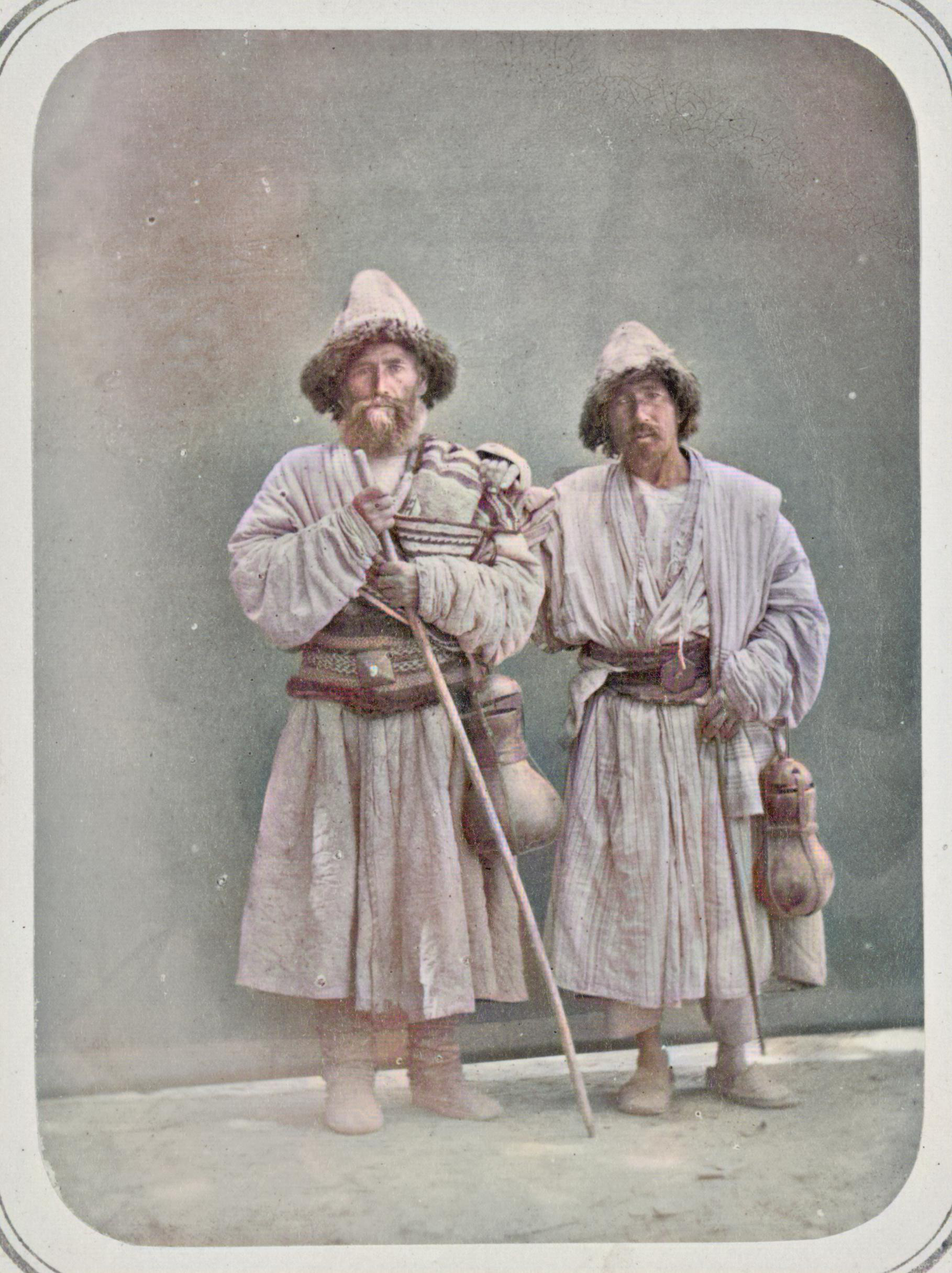
Qalandar beggars in Turkestan between 1865 and 1872

Several later spiritual movements and Sufi schools trace inspiration or lineage to the Qalandari tradition. Among these is the Azeemia order, founded in the 20th century by Qalandar Baba Awliya.

== Origin ==
According to Qalandari hagiographical traditions, the Qalandariyya order traces its origins to Abdul Aziz Makki, who is described as a descendant of the prophet Salih and among the Ashab al-Suffa, the companions who resided in the Suffa area of the Prophet's Mosque Masjid-e-Nabvi in Medina. Tradition holds that after learning of the coming of the Islamic prophet Muhammad, Abdul Aziz Makki prayed to God to allow him to live long enough to witness his era. According to these accounts, his prayer was accepted, he embraced Islam at the hands of Muhammad, and was given the name of Qalandar by the prophet.

Some Sufi traditions associate the early spiritual foundations of the Qalandariyya silsila with the Egyptian mystic Dhu al-Nun al-Misri.

According to some secondary sources, the Qalandariyya are an unorthodox Tariqa of Sufi dervishes that originated in medieval al-Andalus as an answer to the state sponsored Zahirism of the Almohad Caliphate.

According to other secondary sources, the Qalandariyya may have arisen from the earlier Malamatiyya, and exhibited some Buddhist and Hindu influences in South Asia. The Malamatiyya condemned the use of drugs and dressed only in blankets or in hip-length hairshirts.

One could perhaps describe them as ‘‘ostentatious’’ Malamatis. Thus they shaved their eyebrows and beards, wore strange clothing, led an errant life, living off the charity of the local populations. They had no (or very few) zawiyas and wandered about in bands accompanied by flags, drums, and strange music. Their greatest appeal, generally, was to members of the lower and uneducated classes. Their doctrine of disregard for formal religious observances led to great laxity and immorality in their behavior.

== Spread ==
From al-Andalus the Qalandariyya quickly spread into North Africa, the Levant, Arabia, the Iranosphere, Anatolia, Central Asia and Pakistan. In the early 12th century the movement gained popularity in Greater Khorasan and neighbouring regions, including South Asia.

The Qalandariyya played an important role in the historical development of Anatolia, urging the Turkoman chieftains into revolts against the Sultanate of Rum, while exciting them to the idea of militant jihad against the Christians.

The Qalandariyya spread to Hazrat Pandua in Bengal and places in Pakistan through the efforts of multiple Qalandari figures.

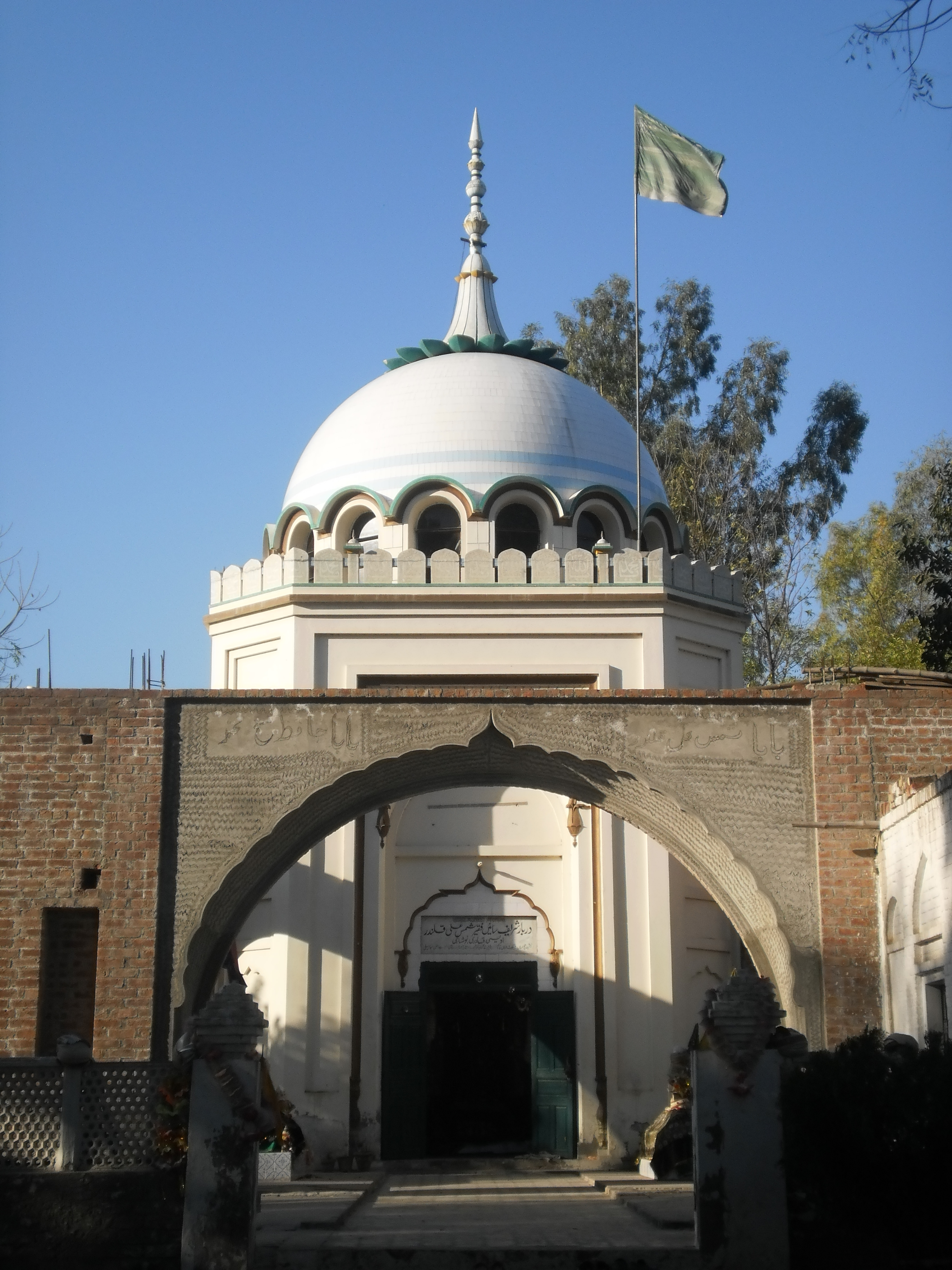
Front view of a shrine dedicated to Shams Ali Qalandar in Pakistan

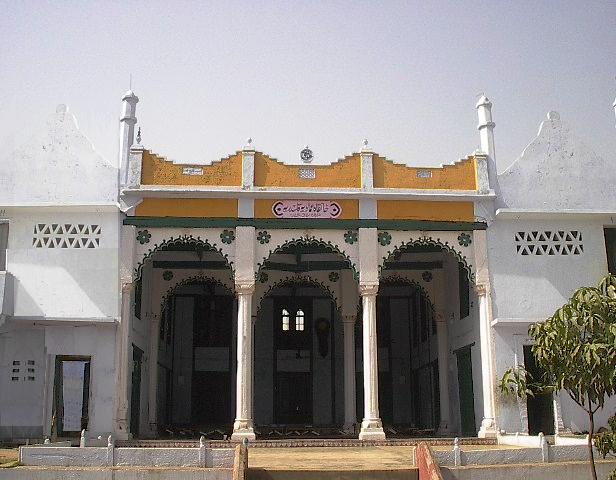
Khanquah Emadia Qalandaria of Khawaja Emaduddin Qalandar Badshah, located in Patna City

Qalandari songs in Pakistan typically incorporate Qawwali styles as well as different local folk styles, such as Bhangra and intense Naqareh or Dhol drumming.

== See also ==
- Azeemiyya
- Suhrawardiyya
- Chishtiyya
- Mawlawiyya
- Rifa'iyya
- Qadiriyya
- Bektashiyya
- Naqshbandiyya
- Zahediyya
- Khalwatiyya
- Bayramiyya
- Safaviyya
- Emadia

== Bibliography ==
- De Bruijn, The Qalandariyya in Persian Mystical Poetry from Sana'i, in The Heritage of Sufism, 2003.
- Ashk Dahlén, The Holy Fool in Medieval Islam: The Qalandariyya of Fakhr al-din Araqi, Orientalia Suecana, vol.52, 2004.
