= Shamsuddin Azeemi =

Pakistani Sufi scholar (1927–2025)

Khawaja Shamsuddin Azeemi
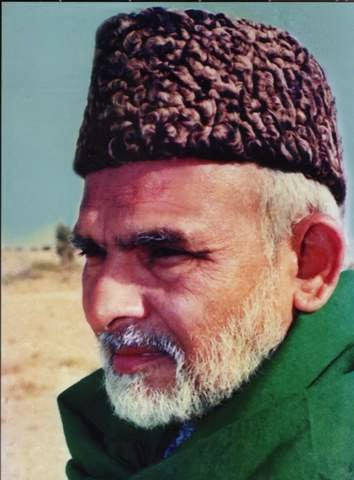
- Azeemi in 1990
- Born: 17 October 1927; Saharanpur, United Provinces of Agra and Oudh, British India
- Died: 21 February 2025 (aged 97); Karachi, Sindh, Pakistan
- Notable work: Muraqaba
- Website: https://azeemiasilsila.org/

Khawaja Shamsuddin Azeemi (Urdu: خواجه شمس الدين عظيمي; 17 October 1927 – 21 February 2025) was a Pakistani Islamic scholar and a prominent master of Tassawuf (Sufism), holding Ijazah and authorisation from his Murshid, Muhammad Azeem Barkhiya, the founder and Shaykh of Silsila Azeemiyya. As the second head of the Azeemiyya order, he played a pivotal role in its expansion and teachings.

Azeemi authored over 20 books on Rūhaniyat (spirituality) and Muraqaba (meditation) and served as the chief editor of the monthly Roohani Digest and Qalander Shaoor in Karachi, Pakistan. He also established a global network of 53 meditation centres, promoting spiritual development and self-awareness.

== Personal life and death ==
Shamsuddin Azeemi was the son of Anis Ahmed Ansari and Umat-ur-Rehman. He traced his lineage to Abu Ayyub al-Ansari, a companion of the Prophet Muhammad, through Abdullah Ansari Herawi of Herat.

Khawaja Shamsuddin Azeemi died on Friday, 21 February 2025 (22 Sha'ban 1446 Hijri) at the age of 97 in Karachi, Pakistan.

== Family and Lineage ==
=== Ancestral Line ===
The lineage of Khawaja Shamsuddin Azeemi is traditionally traced to:

- Abu Ayyub al-Ansari (Khalid ibn Zayd al-Ansari)

[Intervening generations as shown in Khawaja Shamsuddin Azeemi Research Society website's (ksars.org) genealogical records, See last reference in the References list.]

- Qazi Shamsuddin
- Qazi Muhammad Adil
- Khawaja Abdul Malik
- Qazi Usman
- Qazi Miran
- Qazi Abdullah
- Qazi Abdul Latif
- Qazi Muhammad Zahid
- Wali Muhammad
- Yar Muhammad
- Bahauddin
- Ghulam Quddus
- Muhammad Hayat
- Ghulam Jilani
- Haji Nizamuddin

=== Children of Haji Nizamuddin ===
- Munshi Nihal Ahmad
- Munshi Sadiq Ahmad
- Haji Maqbool Ahmad
- Munshi Fazl Ahmad
- Munir-un-Nisa (married to Maulana Khalil Ahmad Bahadurpuri)

=== Immediate Family Branch ===
- Muhammad Akbar
- Khawaja Shamsuddin Azeemi
- Amina Khatun
- Khursheeda Khatun
- Molvi Ilyas Ahmad
- Maulana Idris Ahmad Ansari

=== Descendants of Khawaja Shamsuddin Azeemi ===
- Waqar Yousaf
- Farakh Azam
- Kanwal Gulzar
- Nasira
- Salam Arif
- Noor Ajam
- Nida Afraz
- Shah Alam

== See also ==
- Qalandar Baba Auliya
- Silsila Azeemiyya
- Tajuddin Muhammad Badruddin
