= Islamic schools and branches =

Diagram showing the various branches of Islam: Sunnīsm, Shīʿīsm, Ibadism, Quranism, Non-denominational Muslims, Mahdavia, Ahmadiyya, Nation of Islam, and Sufism.

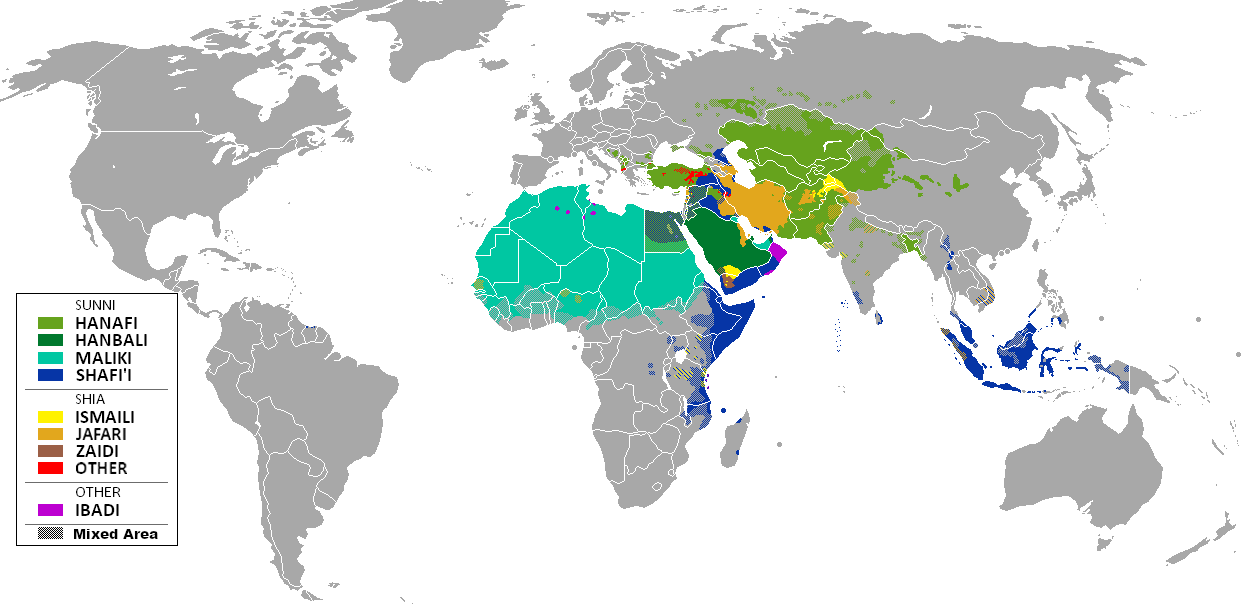
Geographical distribution of the main Islamic branches and their schools of jurisprudence

Islamic schools and branches have different understandings of Islam. There are many different sects or denominations, schools of Islamic jurisprudence, and schools of Islamic theology, or ʿaqīdah (creed). Within Sunnī Islam, there may be differences, such as different orders (tariqa) within Sufism, different schools of theology (Atharī, Ashʿarī, Māturīdī) and jurisprudence (Ḥanafī, Mālikī, Shāfiʿī, Ḥanbalī). Groups in Islam may be numerous (Sunnīs make up 87-90% of all Muslims), or relatively small in size (Ibadis, Ismāʿīlīs, Zaydīs).

Differences between the groups may not be well known to Muslims outside of scholarly circles, or may have induced enough passion to have resulted in political and religious violence (Barelvism, Deobandism, Salafism, Wahhabism). There are informal movements driven by ideas (such as Islamic modernism and Islamism), as well as organized groups with governing bodies (such as Nation of Islam). Some of the Islamic sects and groups regard certain others as deviant or not being truly Muslim (for example, Sunnīs frequently discriminate against Ahmadiyya, Alawites, Quranists, and sometimes Shīʿas). Some Islamic sects and groups date back to the early history of Islam between the 7th and 9th centuries CE (Kharijites, Mu'tazila, Sunnīs, Shīʿas), whereas others have arisen much more recently (Islamic neo-traditionalism, liberalism and progressivism, Islamic modernism, Salafism and Wahhabism), or even in the 20th century (Nation of Islam). Still others were influential historically, but are no longer in existence (non-Ibadi Kharijites and Murji'ah).

Muslims who do not belong to, do not self-identify with, or cannot be readily classified under one of the identifiable Islamic schools and branches are known as non-denominational Muslims.

== Overview ==
The original schism between Kharijites, Sunnīs, and Shīʿas among Muslims was disputed over the political and religious succession to the guidance of the Muslim community (Ummah) after the death of the Islamic prophet Muhammad. From their essentially political position, the Kharijites developed extreme doctrines that set them apart from both mainstream Sunnī and Shīʿa Muslims. Shīʿas believe ʿAlī ibn Abī Ṭālib is the true successor to Muhammad, while Sunnīs consider Abu Bakr to hold that position. The Kharijites broke away from both the Shīʿas and the Sunnīs during the First Fitna (the first Islamic Civil War); they were particularly noted for adopting a radical approach to takfīr (excommunication), whereby they declared both Sunnī and Shīʿa Muslims to be either infidels (kuffār) or false Muslims (munafiqun), and therefore deemed them worthy of death for their perceived apostasy (ridda).

In addition, there are several differences within Sunnī and Shīʿa Islam: Sunnī Islam is separated into four main schools of jurisprudence, namely Mālikī, Ḥanafī, Shāfiʿī, and Ḥanbalī; these schools are named after their founders Mālik ibn Anas, Abū Ḥanīfa al-Nuʿmān, Muḥammad ibn Idrīs al-Shāfiʿī, and Aḥmad ibn Ḥanbal, respectively. Shīʿa Islam, on the other hand, is separated into three major sects: Twelvers, Ismāʿīlīs, and Zaydīs. The vast majority of Shīʿa Muslims are Twelvers (a 2012 estimate puts the figure as 85%), to the extent that the term "Shīʿa" frequently refers to Twelvers by default. All mainstream Twelver and Ismāʿīlī Shīʿa Muslims follow the same school of thought, the Jaʽfari jurisprudence, named after Jaʿfar al-Ṣādiq, the sixth Shīʿīte Imam.

Zaydīs, also known as Fivers, follow the Zaydī school of thought (named after Zayd ibn ʿAlī). Ismāʿīlīsm is another offshoot of Shīʿa Islam that later split into Nizārī and Musta'lī, and the Musta'lī further divided into Ḥāfiẓi and Ṭayyibi. Ṭayyibi Ismāʿīlīs, also known as "Bohras", are split between Dawudi Bohras, Sulaymani Bohras, and Alavi Bohras.

Similarly, Kharijites were initially divided into five major branches: Sufris, Azariqa, Najdat, Adjarites, and Ibadis. Of these, Ibadi Muslims are the only surviving branch of Kharijites. In addition to the aforementioned groups, new schools of thought and movements like Ahmadi Muslims, Quranist Muslims, and African-American Muslims later emerged independently.

Muslims who do not belong to, do not self-identify with, or cannot be readily classified under one of the identifiable Islamic schools and branches are known as non-denominational Muslims.

== Main branches or denominations ==
Demographic distribution of the main three Islamic branches:
1. Sunnīsm (87.3%)
2. Shīʿīsm (11.8%)
3. Ibadism and others (0.90%)

=== Sunnī Islam ===
Sunnī Islam, also known as Ahl as-Sunnah waʾl Jamāʾah or simply Ahl as-Sunnah, is by far the largest denomination of Islam, comprising around 87-90% of the Muslim population in the world. The term Sunnī comes from the word sunnah, which means the teachings, actions, and examples of the Islamic prophet Muhammad and his companions (ṣaḥāba).

Sunnīs believe that Muhammad did not specifically appoint a successor to lead the Muslim community (Ummah) before his death in 632 CE, however they approve of the private election of the first companion, Abū Bakr. Sunnī Muslims regard the first four caliphs—Abū Bakr (632–634), ʿUmar ibn al-Khaṭṭāb (Umar І, 634–644), ʿUthmān ibn ʿAffān (644–656), and ʿAlī ibn Abī Ṭālib (656–661)—as al-Khulafāʾ ur-Rāshidūn ("the Rightly-Guided Caliphs"). Sunnīs also believe that the position of caliph may be attained democratically, on gaining a majority of the votes, but after the Rashidun, the position turned into a hereditary dynastic rule because of the divisions started by the Umayyads and others. After the fall of the Ottoman Empire in 1923, there has never been another caliph as widely recognized in the Muslim world.

Followers of the classical Sunnī schools of jurisprudence and kalām (rationalistic theology) on one hand, and Islamists and Salafists such as Wahhabis and Ahle Hadith, who follow a literalist reading of early Islamic sources, on the other, have laid competing claims to represent the "orthodox" Sunnī Islam. Anglophone Islamic currents of the former type are sometimes referred to as "traditional Islam". Islamic modernism is an offshoot of the Salafi movement that tried to integrate modernism into Islam by being partially influenced by modern-day attempts to revive the ideas of the Muʿtazila school by Islamic scholars such as Muhammad Abduh.

=== Shīʿa Islam ===
Shīʿa Islam is the second-largest denomination of Islam, comprising around 10–13% of the total Muslim population. Although a minority in the Muslim world, Shīʿa Muslims constitute the majority of the Muslim populations in Iran, Iraq and Azerbaijan, as well as significant minorities in Syria, Turkey, South Asia, Yemen, Bahrain, Saudi Arabia, Lebanon, as well as in other parts of the Persian Gulf.

In addition to believing in the supreme authority of the Quran and teachings of Muhammad, Shīʿa Muslims believe that Muhammad's family, the Ahl al-Bayt ("People of the Household"), including his descendants known as Imams, have distinguished spiritual and political authority over the community, and believe that ʿAlī ibn Abī Ṭālib, Muhammad's cousin and son-in-law, was the first of these Imams and the rightful successor to Muhammad, and thus reject the legitimacy of the first three Rāshidūn caliphs.

==== Major sub-denominations ====
- The Twelvers believe in the Twelve Shīʿa Imams and are the only school to comply with the Hadith of the Twelve Successors, where Muhammad stated that he would have twelve successors. This sometimes includes the Alevi and Bektashi schools.
- The Isma'ili are an esoteric Shīʿīte branch that accept Isma'il ibn Jafar as the sixth Imam. Their thought is heavily influenced by philosophy of Neoplatonism. Isma'ilism includes the Nizārī, Sevener, Musta‘lī, Dawudi Bohra, Hebtiahs Bohra, Sulaymani Bohra, and Alavi Bohra sub-denominations.
- The Zaydīs historically derive from the followers of Zayd ibn ʿAlī. In the modern era, they "survive only in northern Yemen". Although they are a Shīʿa sect, "in modern times" they have "shown a strong tendency to move towards the Sunni mainstream".

==== Ghulat movements ====
Shīʿīte groups and movements who either ascribe divine characteristics to some important figures in the history of Islam (usually members of Muhammad's family, the Ahl al-Bayt) or hold beliefs deemed deviant by mainstream Shīʿa Muslims were designated as Ghulat.

- The Alawites—a distinct Arab ethno-religious group—is the only ghulat sect still in existence today. Their movement was developed between the 9th and 10th centuries CE. Historically, Twelver Shīʿīte scholars such as Shaykh Tusi did not consider Alawites Shīʿa Muslims while condemning their beliefs, perceived as heretical. The medieval Sunnī Muslim scholar Ibn Taymiyyah also pointed out that the Alawites were not Shīʿītes. However, the Sunni Grand Mufti of Jerusalem, Haj Amin al-Husseini, issued a fatwa recognizing them as part of the Muslim community in the interest of Arab nationalism. During the Syrian regime of Hafez al-Assad and his son and successor Bashar al-Assad, Alawites have shown a tendency to move towards the regular Twelver Shīʿa Islam.

==== Offshoots of Shīʿa Islam ====
- The Ali-Illahis are a distinct syncretic religious movement which has been practiced in parts of the Luristan region in Iran which combines elements of Shīʿa Islam with older religions. It centers on the belief that there have been successive incarnations of the Deity throughout history, and Ali-Illahis reserve particular reverence for ʿAlī who is considered one such incarnation.
- The Druze are a distinct monotheistic Abrahamic religion and ethno-religious group that developed in the 11th century CE, originally as an offshoot of Ismāʿīlīsm. The Druze faith further split from Ismāʿīlīsm as it developed its own unique doctrines, and finally separated from both Ismāʿīlīsm and Islam altogether; these include the belief that the Imam Al-Ḥākim bi-Amr Allāh was God incarnate. Thus, the Druze do not identify themselves as Muslims, and are not considered as such by Muslims either (See: Islam and Druze). According to the medieval Sunnī Muslim scholar Ibn Taymiyyah, the Druze were not Muslims, neither ′Ahl al-Kitāb (People of the Book), nor mushrikin (polytheists); rather, he labeled them as kuffār (infidels).
- The Baháʼí Faith is a distinct monotheistic universal Abrahamic religion that developed in 19th-century Persia, originally derived as a splinter group from Bábism, another distinct monotheistic Abrahamic religion, itself derived from Twelver Shīʿīsm. Baháʼís believe in an utterly transcendent and inaccessible Supreme Creator of the universe, nevertheless seen as conscious of the creation, with a will and purpose that is expressed through messengers recognized in the Baháʼí Faith as the Manifestations of God (all the Jewish prophets, Zoroaster, Krishna, Gautama Buddha, Jesus, Muhammad, the Báb, and ultimately Baháʼu'lláh). Baháʼís believe that God communicates his will and purpose to humanity through his intermediaries, the prophets and messengers who have founded various world religions from the beginning of humankind up to the present day, and will continue to do so in the future. Bahá'ís and Bábis do not consider themselves Muslims, since both of their religions have superseded Islam, and are not considered as such by Muslims either; rather, they are seen as apostates from Islam. Since both Baháʼís and Bábis reject the Islamic dogma that Muhammad is the last prophet, they have suffered religious discrimination and persecution both in Iran and elsewhere in the Muslim world due to their beliefs. (See: Persecution of Baháʼís).

=== Kharijites ===
The Kharijites (literally, "those who seceded") are a branch who originated during the First Fitna, the struggle for political leadership over the Muslim community, following the assassination in 656 of the third caliph Uthman. It is an extinct sect, except the Ibadis, whose roots go back to them. Kharijites originally supported the caliphate of Ali, but then later on fought against him and eventually succeeded in his martyrdom while he was praying in the mosque of Kufa. While there are few remaining Kharijite or Kharijite-related groups, the term is sometimes used to denote Muslims who refuse to compromise with those with whom they disagree.

Sufris were a major sub-sect of Kharijite in the 7th and 8th centuries, and a part of the Kharijites. Nukkari was a sub-sect of Sufris. Harūrīs were an early Muslim sect from the period of the Four Rightly-Guided Caliphs (632–661 CE), named for their first leader, Habīb ibn-Yazīd al-Harūrī. Azariqa, Najdat, and Adjarites were minor sub-sects.

==== Ibadism ====
The only Khariji Islam sub-sect extant today is Ibadism, which developed out of the 7th century CE. There are currently two geographically separated Ibadi groups—in Oman, where they constitute the majority of the Muslim population in the country, and in North Africa where they constitute significant minorities in Algeria, Tunisia, and Libya. Similarly to another Muslim minority, the Zaydīs, "in modern times" they have "shown a strong tendency" to move towards the Sunnī branch of Islam.

== Schools of Islamic jurisprudence ==
Islamic schools of jurisprudence, known as madhhab, differ in the methodology they use to derive their rulings from the Quran, ḥadīth literature, the sunnah (accounts of the sayings and living habits attributed to the Islamic prophet Muhammad during his lifetime), and the tafsīr literature (exegetical commentaries on the Quran).

=== Sunnī ===
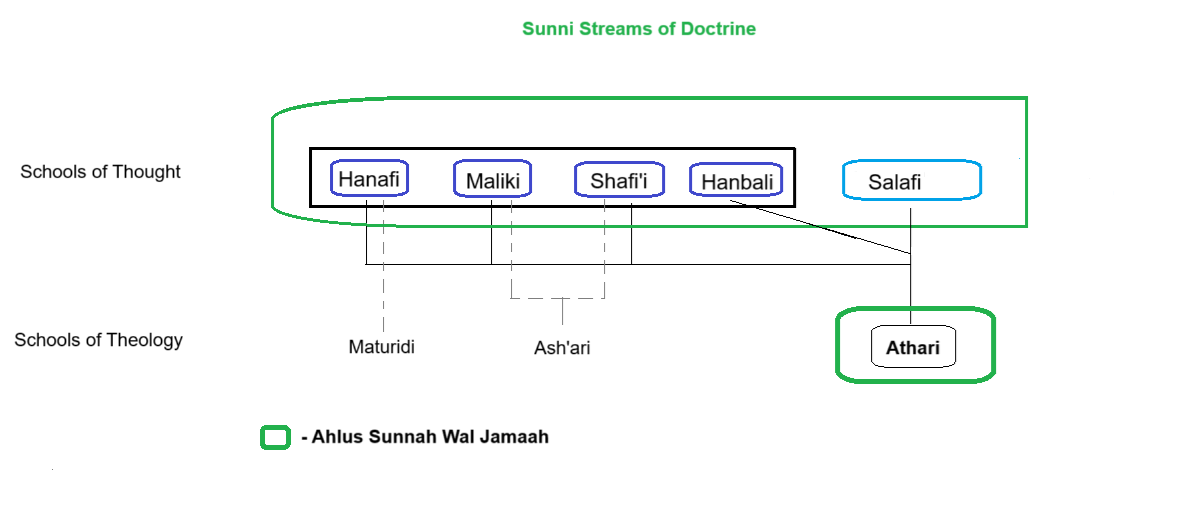
Main schools of thought within Sunni Islam, and other prominent streams

Sunnī Islam contains numerous schools of Islamic jurisprudence (fiqh) and schools of Islamic theology (ʿaqīdah). In terms of religious jurisprudence (fiqh), Sunnism contains several schools of thought (madhhab):

- the Ḥanafī school, named after Abū Ḥanīfa al-Nuʿmān (8th century CE);
- the Mālikī school, named after Mālik ibn Anas (8th century CE);
- the Shāfiʿī school, named after Muḥammad ibn Idrīs al-Shāfiʿī (8th century CE);
- the Ḥanbalī school, named after Aḥmad ibn Ḥanbal (8th century CE);
- the Ẓāhirī school, founded by Dāwūd al-Ẓāhirī (9th century CE).

In terms of religious creed (ʿaqīdah), Sunnism contains several schools of theology:

- the Atharī school, a scholarly movement that emerged in the late 8th century CE;
- the Ashʿarī school, founded by Abū al-Ḥasan al-Ashʿarī (10th century CE);
- the Māturīdī school, founded by Abū Manṣūr al-Māturīdī (10th century CE).

The Salafi movement is a conservative reform branch and/or revivalist movement within Sunnī Islam whose followers do not believe in strictly following one particular madhhab. They include the Wahhabi movement, an Islamic doctrine and religious movement founded by Muhammad ibn ʿAbd al-Wahhab, and the modern Ahle Hadith movement, whose followers call themselves Ahl al-Ḥadīth.

=== Shīʿa ===
In Shīʿa Islam, the major Shīʿīte school of jurisprudence is the Jaʿfari or Imāmī school, named after Jaʿfar al-Ṣādiq, the sixth Shīʿīte Imam. The Jaʿfari jurisprudence is further divided into two branches: the Usuli school, which favors the exercise of ijtihad, and the Akhbari school, which holds the traditions (aḵbār) of the Shīʿīte Imams to be the main source of religious knowledge. Minor Shīʿa schools of jurisprudence include the Ismāʿīlī school (Mustaʿlī-Fāṭimid Ṭayyibi Ismāʿīlīs) and the Zaydī school, both of which have closer affinity to Sunnī jurisprudence. Shīʿīte clergymen and jurists usually carry the title of mujtahid (i.e., someone authorized to issue legal opinions in Shīʿa Islam).

=== Ibadism ===
The fiqh or jurisprudence of Ibadis is relatively simple. Absolute authority is given to the Quran and ḥadīth literature; new innovations accepted on the basis of qiyas (analogical reasoning) were rejected as bid'ah (heresy) by the Ibadis. That differs from the majority of Sunnīs, but agrees with most Shīʿa schools and with the Ẓāhirī and early Ḥanbalī schools of Sunnism.

== Schools of Islamic theology ==
Aqidah is an Islamic term meaning "creed", doctrine, or article of faith. There have existed many schools of Islamic theology, not all of which survive to the present day. Major themes of theological controversies in Islam have included predestination and free will, the nature of the Quran, the nature of the divine attributes, apparent and esoteric meaning of scripture, and the role of dialectical reasoning in the Islamic doctrine.

=== Sunnism ===
==== Classical ====
Kalām is the Islamic philosophy of seeking theological principles through dialectic. In Arabic, the word literally means "speech/words". A scholar of kalām is referred to as a mutakallim (Muslim theologian; plural mutakallimūn). There are many schools of Kalam, the main ones being the Ashʿarī and Māturīdī schools in Sunni Islam.

===== Ashʿarī =====
Ashʿarīsm is a school of theology founded by Abū al-Ḥasan al-Ashʿarī in the 10th century. The Ashʿarīte view was that comprehension of God's unique nature and characteristics was beyond human capability. Ashʿarī theology is considered one of the orthodox creeds of Sunni Islam alongside the Māturīdī theology. Historically, the Ashʿarī theology prevails in Sufism.

===== Māturīdīsm =====
Māturīdism is a school of theology founded by Abū Manṣūr al-Māturīdī in the 10th century, which is a close variant of the Ashʿarī school. Māturīdī theology is considered one of the orthodox creeds of Sunni Islam alongside the Ashʿarī theology, and prevails in the Ḥanafī school of Islamic jurisprudence. Points which differ are the nature of belief and the place of human reason. The Māturīdites state that imān (faith) does not increase nor decrease but remains static; instead, it's taqwā (piety) which increases and decreases. The Ashʿarītes affirm that belief does, in fact, increase and decrease. The Māturīdites affirm that the unaided human mind is able to find out that some of the more major sins, such as alcohol or murder, are evil without the help of revelation. The Ashʿarītes affirm that the unaided human mind cannot know if something is good or evil, lawful or unlawful, without divine revelation.

==== Atharism ====
The Atharī school derives its name from the word "tradition" as a translation of the Arabic word hadith or from the Arabic word athar, meaning "narrations". The traditionalist creed is to avoid delving into extensive theological speculation. They rely on the Qur'an, the Sunnah, and sayings of the Sahaba, seeing this as the middle path where the attributes of Allah are accepted without questioning their nature (bi-la kayf). Ahmad ibn Hanbal is regarded as the leader of the traditionalist school of creed. Western scholars of Islamic studies remark that it would be incorrect to consider Atharism and Hanbalism as synonymous, since there have been Hanbali scholars who have explicitly rejected and opposed the Athari theology. The modern Salafi movement associates itself with the Atharī creed.

=== Muʿtazilism ===
Muʿtazilite theology originated in the 8th century in Basra when Wasil ibn Ata left the teaching lessons of Hasan al-Basri after a theological dispute. He and his followers expanded on the logic and rationalism of Greek philosophy, seeking to combine them with Islamic doctrines and show that the two were inherently compatible. The Mu'tazilite resolved many theological and philosophical discourse issues, such as whether the Qur'an was created or eternal with God, whether evil was created by God or existed by itself, the problem of destiny versus free will, and whether the Qur'an should be interpreted allegorically or literally. In this regard, Mu'tazila places more emphasis on rationality in answering Islamic theological and philosophical questions.

=== Murji'ah ===
Murji'ah was a name for an early politico-religious movement that referred to all those who identified faith (iman) with belief to the exclusion of acts. Originating during the caliphates of Uthman and Ali, Murijites opposed the Kharijites, holding that only God has the authority to judge who is a true Muslim and who is not, and that Muslims should consider all other Muslims as part of the community. Two major Murijite sub-sects were the Karamiya and Sawbaniyya.

=== Qadariyyah ===
Qadariyya is an originally derogatory term designating early Islamic theologians who asserted that humans possess free will, whose exercise makes them responsible for their actions, justifying divine punishment and absolving God of responsibility for evil in the world. Some of their doctrines were later adopted by the Mu'tazilis and rejected by the Ash'aris.

=== Jabriyah ===
In direct contrast to the Qadariyyah, Jabriyah was an early Islamic philosophical school based on the belief that humans are controlled by predestination, without having choice or free will. The Jabriya school originated during the Umayyad dynasty in Basra. The first representative of this school was Al-Ja'd ibn Dirham, who was executed in 724. The term is derived from the Arabic root j-b-r, in the sense which gives the meaning of someone who is forced or coerced by destiny. The term Jabriyah was also a derogatory term used by different Islamic groups that they considered wrong, The Ash'ariyah used the term Jabriyah in the first place to describe the followers of Jahm ibn Safwan, who died in 746, in that they regarded their faith as a middle position between Qadariyah and Jabriya. On the other hand, the Mu'tazilah considered the Ash'ariyah as Jabriyah because, in their opinion, they rejected the orthodox doctrine of free will. The Shiites used the term Jabriyah to describe the Ash'ariyah and Hanbalis.

=== Jahmiyya ===
Jahmis were the alleged followers of the early Islamic theologian Jahm bin Safwan who associated himself with Al-Harith ibn Surayj. He was an exponent of extreme determinism according to which a man acts only metaphorically in the same way in which the sun acts or does something when it sets.

=== Batiniyyah ===
Bāṭiniyyah is a name given to an allegoristic type of scriptural interpretation developed among some Shia groups, stressing the bāṭin (inward, esoteric) meaning of texts. It has been retained by all branches of Isma'ilism and its Druze offshoot. Alevism, Bektashism and folk religion, Hurufis and Alawites practice a similar system of interpretation.

== Sufism ==
Sufism is Islam's mystical-ascetic dimension and is represented by schools or orders known as Tasawwufī-Ṭarīqah. It is seen as that aspect of Islamic teaching that deals with the purification of the inner self. By focusing on the more spiritual aspects of religion, Sufis strive to obtain direct experience of God by making use of "intuitive and emotional faculties" that one must be trained to use.

The following list contains some notable Sufi orders:

- The Azeemiyya order was founded in 1960 by Qalandar Baba Auliya, also known as Syed Muhammad Azeem Barkhia.
- The Bektashi order was founded in the 13th century by the Islamic saint Haji Bektash Veli, and greatly influenced during its formative period by the Hurufi Ali al-'Ala in the 15th century and reorganized by Balım Sultan in the 16th century. Because of its adherence to the Twelve Imams, it is classified under Twelver Shia Islam.
- The Chishti order (Persian: چشتیہ) was founded by (Khawaja) Abu Ishaq Shami ("the Syrian"; died 941) who brought Sufism to the town of Chisht, some 95 miles east of Herat in present-day Afghanistan. Before returning to the Levant, Shami initiated, trained, and deputized the son of the local Emir (Khwaja) Abu Ahmad Abdal (died 966). Under the leadership of Abu Ahmad's descendants, the Chishtiyya as they are also known, flourished as a regional mystical order. The founder of the Chishti Order in South Asia was Moinuddin Chishti. The founder of the Chishti Order in South Africa was Hajee Shah Goolam Mohamed Soofie Siddique Chishti Al-Qadiri Habibi or commonly known has Hazrat Soofie Saheb.
- The Kubrawiya order was founded in the 13th century by Najmuddin Kubra in Bukhara in modern-day Uzbekistan.
- The Mevlevi order is better known in the West as the "whirling dervishes".
- Mouride is most prominent in Senegal and The Gambia, with headquarters in the holy city of Touba, Senegal.
- The Naqshbandi order was founded in 1380 by Baha-ud-Din Naqshband Bukhari. It is considered by some to be a "sober" order known for its silent dhikr (remembrance of God) rather than the vocalized forms of dhikr common in other orders. The Süleymani and Khalidiyya orders are offshoots of the Naqshbandi order.
- The Ni'matullahi order is the most widespread Sufi order of Persia today. It was founded by Shah Ni'matullah Wali (d. 1367), established and transformed from his inheritance of the Ma'rufiyyah circle. There are several suborders in existence today, the most known and influential in the West following the lineage of Javad Nurbakhsh, who brought the order to the West following the 1979 Iranian Revolution.
- The Noorbakshia order, also called Nurbakshia, claims to trace its direct spiritual lineage and chain (silsilah) to the Islamic prophet Muhammad, through Ali, by way of Ali Al-Ridha. This order became known as Nurbakshi after Shah Syed Muhammad Nurbakhsh Qahistani, who was aligned to the Kubrawiya order.
- The Oveysi (or Uwaiysi) order claims to have been founded 1,400 years ago by Uwais al-Qarni from Yemen.
- The Qadiri order is among the oldest Sufi Orders. It derives its name from Abdul-Qadir Gilani (1077–1166), a native of the Iranian province of Gīlān. The order is one of the most widespread Sufi orders in the Islamic world, and can be found in Central Asia, Turkey, Balkans, and much of East and West Africa. The Qadiriyyah have not developed any distinctive doctrines or teachings outside mainstream Islam. They believe in the fundamental principles of Islam, but interpret them through mystical experience. The Ba'Alawi order is an offshoot of Qadiriyyah.
- Senussi is a religious-political Sufi order established by Muhammad ibn Ali as-Senussi. As-Senussi founded this movement due to his criticism of the Egyptian ulema.
- The Shadhili order was founded by Abu-l-Hassan ash-Shadhili. Followers (murids Arabic: seekers) of the Shadhiliyya are often known as Shadhilis.
- The Suhrawardiyya order (Arabic: سهروردية) is a Sufi order founded by Abu al-Najib al-Suhrawardi (1097–1168).
- The Tijaniyyah order attaches a large importance to culture and education, and emphasizes the individual adhesion of the disciple (murid).

== Later movements ==
=== African-American movements ===
Many slaves brought from Africa to the Western Hemisphere were Muslims, and the early 20th century saw the rise of distinct Islamic religious and political movements within the African-American community in the United States, such as Darul Islam, the Islamic Party of North America, the Mosque of Islamic Brotherhood (MIB), the Muslim Alliance in North America, the Moorish Science Temple of America, the Nation of Islam (NOI), and the Ansaaru Allah Community. They sought to ascribe Islamic heritage to African Americans, thereby giving much emphasis on racial and ethnic aspects (see black nationalism and black separatism). These black Muslim movements often differ greatly in matters of doctrine from mainstream Islam. They include:

- Moorish Science Temple of America, founded in 1913 by Noble Drew Ali (born Timothy Drew). The Moorish Science Temple of America is characterized by a strong African-American ethnic and religious identity.
  - Moorish Orthodox Church of America
- Nation of Islam, founded by Wallace Fard Muhammad in Detroit in 1930, with a declared aim of "resurrecting" the spiritual, mental, social, and economic condition of the black man and woman of America and the world. The Nation of Islam believes that Wallace Fard Muhammad was God on earth. The Nation of Islam doesn't consider the Arabian Muhammad as the final prophet and instead regards Elijah Muhammad, successor of Wallace Fard Muhammad, as the true Messenger of Allah.
  - American Society of Muslims: Warith Deen Mohammed established the American Society of Muslims in 1975. This offshoot of the Nation of Islam wanted to bring its teachings more in line with mainstream Sunni Islam, establishing mosques instead of temples, and promoting the Five pillars of Islam.
  - Five-Percent Nation
  - United Nation of Islam

=== Ahmadiyya Movement in Islam ===
The Ahmadiyya Movement in Islam was founded in British India in 1889 by Mirza Ghulam Ahmad of Qadian, who claimed to be the promised Messiah ("Second Coming of Christ"), the Mahdi awaited by the Muslims as well as a "subordinate" prophet to the Islamic prophet Muhammad. Ahmadis claim to practice the pristine form of Islam as followed by Muhammad and his earliest followers. They believe that it was Mirza Ghulam Ahmad's task to restore the original sharia given to Muhammad by guiding the Ummah back to the "true" Islam and defeat the attacks on Islam by other religions.

There are a wide variety of distinct beliefs and teachings of Ahmadis compared to those of most other Muslims, which include the interpretation of the Quranic title Khatam an-Nabiyyin, interpretation of the Messiah's Second Coming, complete rejection of the abrogation/cancellation of Quranic verses, belief that Jesus survived the crucifixion and died of old age in India, conditions of the "Jihad of the Sword" are no longer met, belief that divine revelation (as long as no new sharia is given) will never end, belief in cyclical nature of history until Muhammad, and belief in the implausibility of a contradiction between Islam and science. These perceived deviations from normative Islamic thought have resulted in severe persecution of Ahmadis in various Muslim-majority countries, particularly Pakistan, where they have been branded as Non-Muslims and their Islamic religious practices are punishable by the Ahmadi-Specific laws in the penal code.

The followers of the Ahmadiyya Movement in Islam are divided into two groups: the first being the Ahmadiyya Muslim Community, currently the dominant group, and the Lahore Ahmadiyya Movement for the Propagation of Islam. The larger group takes a literalist view believing that Mirza Ghulam Ahmad was the promised Mahdi and a Ummati Nabi subservient to Muhammad, while the latter believing that he was only a religious reformer and a prophet only in an allegorical sense. Both Ahmadi groups are active in dawah or Islamic missionary work, and have produced vasts amounts of Islamic literature, including numerous translations of the Quran, translations of the Hadith, Quranic tafsirs, a multitude of sirahs of Muhammad, and works on the subject of comparative religion among others. As such, their international influence far exceeds their number of adherents. Muslims from more Orthodox sects of Islam have adopted many Ahmadi polemics and understandings of other religions, along with the Ahmadi approach to reconcile Islamic and Western education as well as to establish Islamic school systems, particularly in Africa.

=== Barelvi/Deobandi split ===
Sunni Muslims of the Indian subcontinent, comprising present-day India, Pakistan, and Bangladesh, are overwhelmingly Hanafi by fiqh and have split into two schools or movements—the Barelvi and the Deobandi. While the Deobandi is revivalist in nature, the Barelvi are more traditional and inclined towards Sufism.

=== Gülen / Hizmet movement ===
The Gülen movement, usually referred to as the Hizmet movement, established in the 1970s as an offshoot of the Nur Movement and led by the Turkish Islamic scholar and preacher Fethullah Gülen in Turkey, Central Asia, and in other parts of the world, is active in education, with private schools and universities in over 180 countries as well as with many American charter schools operated by followers. It has initiated forums for interfaith dialogue. The Cemaat movement's structure has been described as a flexible organizational network. Movement schools and businesses organize locally and link themselves into informal networks. Estimates of the number of schools and educational institutions vary widely; it appears there are about 300 Gülen movement schools in Turkey and over 1,000 schools worldwide.

=== Islamic modernism ===
Islamic modernism, also sometimes referred to as "modernist Salafism", is a movement that has been described as "the first Muslim ideological response" attempting to reconcile Islamic faith with modern Western values such as nationalism, democracy, and science.

=== Islamism ===
Islamism is a set of political ideologies, derived from various fundamentalist views, which hold that Islam is not only a religion but a political system that should govern the legal, economic, and social imperatives of the state. Many Islamists do not refer to themselves as such; it is not a single particular movement. Religious views and ideologies of its adherents vary, and they may be Sunni Islamists or Shia Islamists depending upon their beliefs. Islamist groups include groups such as Al-Qaeda, the organizer of the September 11, 2001 attacks and perhaps the most prominent; and the Muslim Brotherhood, the largest and perhaps the oldest. Although violence is often employed by some organizations, most Islamist movements are nonviolent.

==== Muslim Brotherhood ====
The Al-Ikhwan Al-Muslimun (with Ikhwan الإخوان brethren) or Muslim Brotherhood, is an organisation that was founded by Egyptian scholar Hassan al-Banna, a graduate of Dar al-Ulum. With its various branches, it is the largest Sunni movement in the Arab world, and an affiliate is often the largest opposition party in many Arab nations. The Muslim Brotherhood is not concerned with theological differences, accepting both Muslims of any of the four Sunni schools of thought and Shi'a Muslims. It is the world's oldest and largest Islamist group. It aims to re-establish the Caliphate and, in the meantime, push for more Islamisation of society. The Brotherhood's stated goal is to instill the Qur'an and sunnah as the "sole reference point for... ordering the life of the Muslim family, individual, community... and state".

==== Jamaat-e-Islami ====
The Jamaat-e-Islami (or JI) is an Islamist political party in the Indian subcontinent. It was founded in Lahore, British India, by Sayyid Abul Ala Maududi (with alternative spellings of last name Maudoodi) in 1941 and is the oldest religious party in Pakistan. Today, sister organizations with similar objectives and ideological approaches exist in India (Jamaat-e-Islami Hind), Bangladesh (Jamaat-e-Islami Bangladesh), Kashmir (Jamaat-e-Islami Kashmir), and Sri Lanka, and there are "close brotherly relations" with the Islamist movements and missions "working in different continents and countries", particularly those affiliated with the Muslim Brotherhood (Akhwan-al-Muslimeen). The JI envisions an Islamic government in Pakistan and Bangladesh governs by Islamic law. It opposes Westernization—including secularization, capitalism, socialism, or such practices as interest-based banking, and favours an Islamic economic order and Caliphate.

==== Hizb ut-Tahrir ====
Hizb ut-Tahrir (Arabic: حزب التحرير) (Translation: Party of Liberation) is an international, pan-Islamist political organization which describes its ideology as Islam, and its aim the re-establishment of the Islamic Khilafah (Caliphate) to resume Islamic ways of life in the Muslim world. The caliphate would unite the Muslim community (Ummah) upon their Islamic creed and implement the Shariah, so as to then carry the proselytizing of Islam to the rest of the world.

==== Revivalism ====
===== Ahle Hadith =====
Ahl-i Hadith (Persian: اهل حدیث, Urdu: اہل حدیث: transl. People of the traditions of the Prophet) is a movement which emerged in the Indian subcontinent in the mid-19th century. Its followers call themselves Ahl al-Hadith and are considered to be a branch of the Salafiyya school. Ahl-i Hadith is antithetical to various beliefs and mystical practices associated with folk Sufism. Ahl-i Hadith shares many doctrinal similarities with the Wahhabi movement and hence is often classified as being synonymous with the "Wahhabis" by its adversaries. However, its followers reject this designation, preferring to identify themselves as "Salafis".

===== Salafiyya movement =====
The Salafiyya movement is a conservative, Islahi (reform) movement within Sunni Islam that emerged in the second half of the 19th century and advocate a return to the traditions of the "devout ancestors" (Salaf al-Salih). It has been described as the "fastest-growing Islamic movement"; with each scholar expressing diverse views across social, theological, and political spectrum. Salafis follow a doctrine that can be summed up as taking "a fundamentalist approach to Islam, emulating the Prophet Muhammad and his earliest followers—al-salaf al-salih, the 'pious forefathers'....They reject religious innovation, or bidʻah, and support the implementation of Sharia (Islamic law)." The Salafi movement is often divided into three categories: the largest group are the purists (or quietists), who avoid politics; the second largest group are the militant activists, who get involved in politics; the third and last group are the jihadists, who constitute a minority. Most of the violent Islamist groups come from the Salafi-Jihadist movement and their subgroups. In recent years, Jihadi-Salafist doctrines have often been associated with the armed insurgencies of Islamic extremist movements and terrorist organizations targeting innocent civilians, both Muslims and Non-Muslims, such as al-Qaeda, ISIL/ISIS/IS/Daesh, Boko Haram, etc. The second largest group are the Salafi activists who have a long tradition of political activism, such as those that operate in organizations like the Muslim Brotherhood, the Arab world's major Islamist movement. In the aftermath of widescale repressions after the Arab Spring, accompanied by their political failures, the activist-Salafi movements have undergone a decline. The most numerous are the quietists, who believe in disengagement from politics and accept allegiance to Muslim governments, no matter how tyrannical, to avoid fitna (chaos).

====== Wahhabism ======
The Wahhabi movement was founded and spearheaded by the Ḥanbalī scholar and theologian Muhammad ibn ʿAbd al-Wahhab, a religious preacher from the Najd region in central Arabia, and was instrumental in the rise of the House of Saud to power in the Arabian peninsula. Ibn ʿAbd al-Wahhab sought to revive and purify Islam from what he perceived as non-Islamic popular religious beliefs and practices by returning to what, he believed, were the fundamental principles of the Islamic religion. His works were generally short, full of quotations from the Quran and Hadith literature, such as his main and foremost theological treatise, Kitāb at-Tawḥīd (Arabic: كتاب التوحيد; "The Book of Oneness"). He taught that the primary doctrine of Islam was the uniqueness and oneness of God (tawḥīd), and denounced what he held to be popular religious beliefs and practices among Muslims that he considered to be akin to heretical innovation (bidʿah) and polytheism (shirk).

Wahhabism has been described as a conservative, strict, and fundamentalist branch of Sunnī Islam, with puritan views, believing in a literal interpretation of the Quran. The terms "Wahhabism" and "Salafism" are sometimes evoked interchangeably, although the designation "Wahhabi" is specifically applied to the followers of Muhammad ibn ʿAbd al-Wahhab and his reformist doctrines. The label "Wahhabi" was not claimed by his followers, who usually refer themselves as al-Muwaḥḥidūn ("affirmers of the singularity of God"), but is rather employed by Western scholars as well as his critics. Starting in the mid-1970s and 1980s, the international propagation of Salafism and Wahhabism within Sunnī Islam favored by the Kingdom of Saudi Arabia and other Arab states of the Persian Gulf has achieved what the French political scientist Gilles Kepel defined as a "preeminent position of strength in the global expression of Islam."

22 months after the September 11 attacks, when the FBI considered al-Qaeda as "the number one terrorist threat to the United States", journalist Stephen Schwartz and U.S. Senator Jon Kyl have explicitly stated during a hearing that occurred in June 2003 before the Subcommittee on Terrorism, Technology, and Homeland Security of the U.S. Senate that "Wahhabism is the source of the overwhelming majority of terrorist atrocities in today's world". As part of the global "War on terror", Wahhabism has been accused by the European Parliament, various Western security analysts, and think tanks like the RAND Corporation, as being "a source of global terrorism". Furthermore, Wahhabism has been accused of causing disunity in the Muslim community (Ummah) and criticized for its followers' destruction of many Islamic, cultural, and historical sites associated with the early history of Islam and the first generation of Muslims (Muhammad's family and his companions) in Saudi Arabia.

=== Quranism ===
Quranism or Quraniyya (Arabic: القرآنية; al-Qur'āniyya) is a quran only branch of Islam. It holds the belief that Islamic guidance and law should only be based on the Quran, thus opposing the religious authority and authenticity of the hadith literature. Quranists believe that God's message is already clear and complete in the Quran and it can therefore be fully understood without referencing outside texts. Quranists claim that the vast majority of hadith literature are forged lies and believe that the Quran itself criticizes the hadith both in the technical sense and the general sense.

=== Liberal and progressive Islam ===
Liberal Islam originally emerged from the Islamic revivalist movement of the 18th–19th centuries. Liberal and progressive Islamic organizations and movements are primarily based in the Western world, and have in common a religious outlook which depends mainly on ijtihad or re-interpretation of the sacred scriptures of Islam. Liberal and progressive Muslims are characterized by a rationalistic, critical examination and re-interpretation of the sacred scriptures of Islam; affirmation and promotion of democracy, gender equality, human rights, LGBT rights, women's rights, religious pluralism, interfaith marriage, freedom of expression, freedom of thought, and freedom of religion; opposition to theocracy and total rejection of Islamism and Islamic fundamentalism; and a modern view of Islamic theology, ethics, sharia, culture, tradition, and other ritualistic practices in Islam.

=== Mahdavia ===
Mahdavia, or Mahdavism, is a Mahdiist sect founded in late 15th century India by Syed Muhammad Jaunpuri, who declared himself to be the Hidden Twelfth Imam of the Twelver Shia tradition. They follow many aspects of the Sunni doctrine. Zikri Mahdavis, or Zikris, are an offshoot of the Mahdavi movement.

=== Non-denominational Muslims ===
"Non-denominational Muslims" (Arabic: مسلمون بلا طائفة, romanized: Muslimūn bi-la ṭā’ifa) is an umbrella term that has been used for and by Muslims who do not belong to a specific Islamic denomination, do not self-identify with any specific Islamic denomination, or cannot be readily classified under one of the identifiable Islamic schools and branches. A quarter of the world's Muslim population see themselves as "just a Muslim".

Non-denominational Muslims constitute the majority of the Muslim population in seven countries, and a plurality in three others: Albania (65%), Kyrgyzstan (64%), Kosovo (58%), Indonesia (56%), Mali (55%), Bosnia and Herzegovina (54%), Uzbekistan (54%), Azerbaijan (45%), Russia (45%), and Nigeria (42%). They are found primarily in Central Asia. Kazakhstan has the largest number of non-denominational Muslims, who constitute about 74% of the population. While the majority of the population in the Middle East identify as either Sunni or Shi'a, a significant number of Muslims identify as non-denominational. Southeastern Europe also has a large number of non-denominational Muslims.

In 1947, the non-sectarian movement Jama'ah al-Taqrib bayna al-Madhahib al-Islamiyyah was founded in Cairo, Egypt. Several of its supporters were high-ranking scholars of Al-Ahzar University. The movement sought to bridge the gap between Sunnis and Shi'is. At the end of the 1950s, the movement reached a wider public, as the Egyptian president Gamal Abdel Nasser discovered the usefulness of pan-Islamism for his foreign policy.

== Population of the branches ==
Denomination	Population
Sunni	Varies: 87% – 90%
Non-denominational Muslim	25%
Shia	Varies: 10% – 13%
Ibadi	2.7 million
Quranism	n/a

== See also ==
- Muslim sectarian violence
- Amman Message
- Aqidah
- International Islamic Unity Conference (Iran)
- Islamic eschatology
- Iran-Saudi Arabia proxy conflict
- Islamic studies
- Madhhab
- Schools of Islamic theology
- Shia crescent
- Shia–Sunni relations
- Succession to Muhammad
- Glossary of Islam
- Outline of Islam
- Index of Islam-related articles
