= Qalandar (title) =

Honorific denoting high spiritual rank

Qalandar (قلندر) in Sufism is used as a title for some Sufis who are considered especially spiritual. Some people for whom the title is used are Lal Shahbaz Qalandar, Bu Ali Shah Qalandar, Syed Shah Abdul Latif Kazmi Al-Mashhadi Qalandar, Shams Ali Qalandar, Rabia Basri, and Qalandar Baba Auliya.

In Sufi tradition, the title of Qalandar is a designation for an elevated spiritual status of a Wali, often linked with the Hadith Qudsi:

“I become his hearing with which he hears, his sight with which he sees, and his tongue with which he speaks.” — Sahih al-Bukhari, Hadith 6502

== Origin of the title ==
According to traditions of the Qalandari Sufi order, the title Qalandar was first bestowed upon Abdul Aziz Makki, who was described as a descendant of prophet Salih among the Ashab al-Suffa, the companions who resided in the Suffa area of the Prophet's Mosque Masjid-e-Nabvi in Medina. The tradition states that after hearing of the coming of the Islamic prophet Muhammad, Abdul Aziz Makki prayed to God to allow him to live long enough to witness the era of prophet Muhammad. His prayer was answered, and after embracing Islam at the hands of Muhammad, he was given the name of Qalandar. The account is mentioned in the book Munaqib-e-Qalanderiyat.

Some Sufi traditions associate the early spiritual foundations of the Qalandariyya silsila with the Egyptian mystic Dhu al-Nun al-Misri.

== See also ==
- Dervish
- Fakir

== Sources ==
- Ewing, Katherine Pratt (1997). Arguing Sainthood: Modernity, Psychoanalysis, and Islam. Durham, North Carolina: Duke University Press. ISBN 0-8223-2026-6.
