= Muhammad Azeem Barkhiya =

Muslim mystic, spiritual teacher and founder of the Azeemia Sufi Order (c. 1898–1979)

Hazrat Qalandar Baba Auliya Muhammad Azeem Barkhiya
- حسن اخریٰ محمد عظیم برخیا قلندر بابا اولیاء
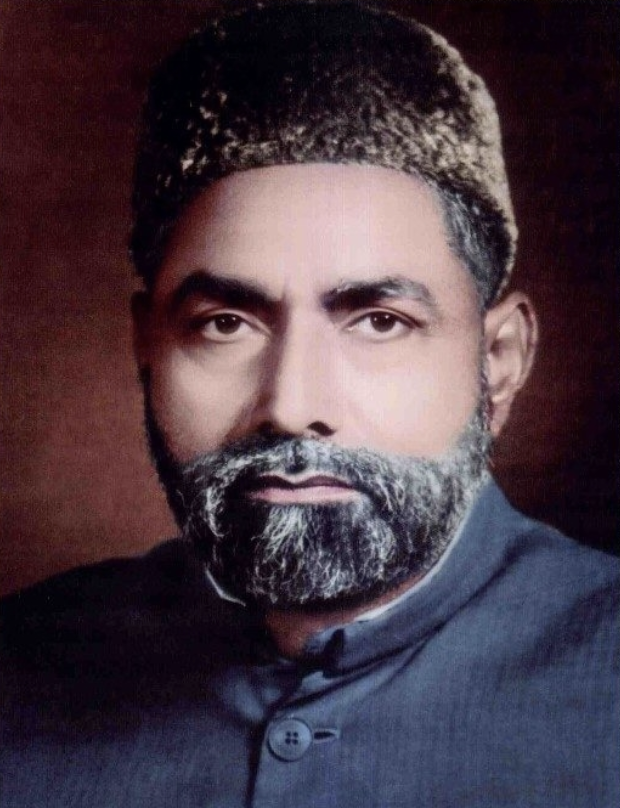
- Title: Qalandar Baba Auliya

Personal life
- Born: c. 1898 Khurja, United Provinces of Agra and Oudh, British India
- Died: 27 January 1979 CE Karachi, Sindh, Pakistan
- Resting place: Shadman, Karachi, Pakistan
- Era: 20th century
- Main interest(s): Sufism, spirituality
- Notable works: لوح و قلم (Loh-o-Qalam) - spiritual teachings; رباعیات (Rubaiyat) - mystical poetry; تذکرہ تاج الدین بابا (Tazkira Tajuddin Baba) - a brief hagiography of Tajuddin Baba
- Known for: Founder of the Azeemia Sufi Order and teachings on Roohani science

Religious life
- Religion: Islam
- Order: Sufi
- Tariqa: Silsila Azeemiyya (founder)

Muslim leader
- Successor: Shamsuddin Azeemi
- Disciples: Shamsuddin Azeemi, Abdul Qadir Qalandari Azeemi, Badar-u-Zaman Azeemi

Imam Hassan Ukhra Muhammad Azeem Barkhiya (Urdu: امام حسن اخرٰی محمد عظیم برخیا; 1898 – 27 January 1979), commonly referred to as Qalandar Baba Auliya (قلندر بابا اولیاء), was the founding Imam of the Azeemiyya sufi order. The title Qalandar reflects his recognized authority in Tasawwuf, and he is also regarded as an Abdāl, commonly known by the honorific "Abdāl Haqq" (ابدال حق). He received supervision in spiritual matters by his maternal grandfather, Tajuddin Baba, who oversaw his early spiritual development for nine years. A second initiation is mentioned in some accounts from 1956, when he sought discipleship under Abul Faiz Qalandar Ali Suhrawardi, a Pakistani Sufi figure of the Suhrawardiyya. He also oversaw the training of his main student and spiritual inheritor Khawaja Shamsuddin Azeemi for 16 years, who went on to lead Silsila Azeemia for over 45 years.

Muhammad Azeem Barkhiya traced both his paternal and maternal ancestry to Imam Hasan al-Askari. Loh-o-Qalam (لوح و قلم), a compilation of his teachings, remains a foundational metaphysical text on the attainment of irfan in modern Urdu, and has inspired a substantial body of literature on Sufism. Accounts of mystical experiences attributed to him are recorded in Tazkirah Qalandar Baba Awliya.

== Affiliation with Sufi orders ==
Azeemiyya tradition maintains that Muhammad Azeem Barkhiya was designated the principal spiritual heir (خانوادہ) of eleven distinct Sufi orders from historical masters. This authority is believed to have been conferred through the Nisbah Uwaisiyya (نسبت اویسیہ), a non-physical mode of transmission where spiritual succession and permission are granted directly by masters who lived centuries prior. The eleven lineages associated with this transmission are:

- Qalandariyya (قلندریہ): Dhu al-Nun al-Misri
- Nuriyya (نوریہ): Musa al-Kazim
- Chishtiyya (چشتیہ): Khwāja Mumshād ʿUlū Ad-Dīnawarī
- Naqshbandiyya (نقشبندیہ): Khwaja Baqi Billah
- Suhrawardiyya (سہروردیہ): Abu al-Najib Suhrawardi
- Qadriyya (قادریہ): Abdul Qadir Gilani
- Tayfuriyya (طیفوریہ): Bayazid Bastami
- Junaydiyya (جنیدیہ): Junayd Baghdadi
- Malamatiyya (ملامتیہ): Dhu al-Nun al-Misri
- Firdousiyya (فردوسیہ): Najm al-Din Kubra
- Tajiyya (تاجیہ): Muhammad Sughra Tajuddin

== Death and succession ==
He appointed Khawaja Shamsuddin Azeemi as head of the Silsila, and passed away on 27 January 1979. On this date, his Urs (Death Anniversary) is organized in which members of the Silsila congregate to recite the Quran and commemorate his contributions on matters of Tassawuf. The Silsila also marks his Urs annually as a two-day series of workshops and seminars, which is attended by thousands of supporters from around Pakistan and abroad. His resting place is located in the Shadman district of Karachi, Pakistan.
