= Meetha Neem Dargah =

Sufi shrine in Maharashtra, India

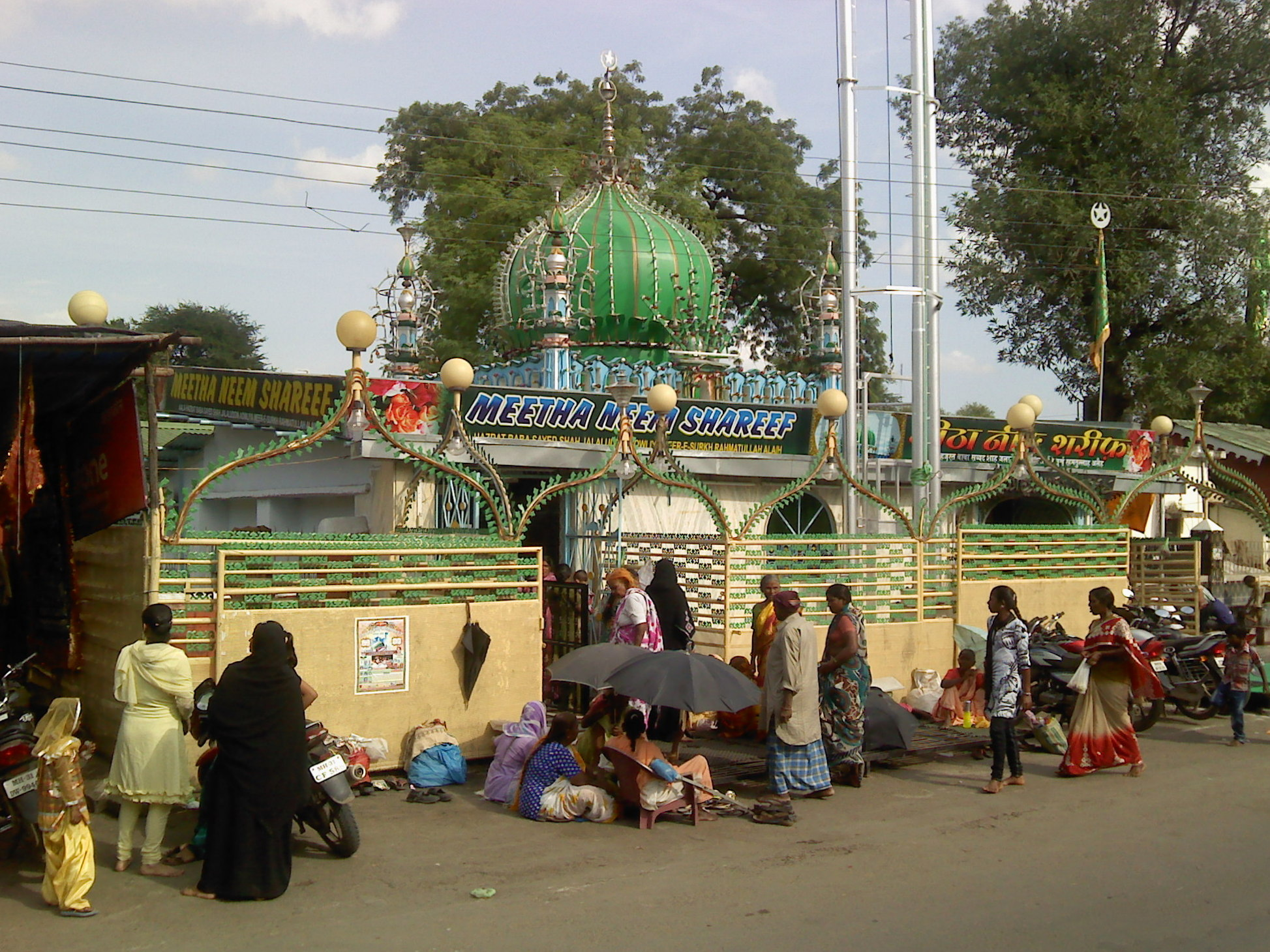

Religion
- Affiliation: Sufism
- District: Nagpur
- Region: Vidarbha
- Rite: Qadiriyya Sufi
- Festival: Urs
- Ecclesiastical or organizational status: Mosque and shrine
- Governing body: Dargah Trust
- Status: Active

Location
- Location: Civil lines Nagpur
- Municipality: Nagpur
- State: Maharashtra
- Country: India
- Interactive map of Meetha Neem Dargah
- Coordinates: 21°09′06″N 79°04′43″E

Architecture
- Type: Islamic architecture

Meetha-Neem Dargah also known as Meetha-Neem Sharif is the resting place of Aala Hazrat Sufi Saint Sayyad Jalaluddin Meer Surkh. It is located at civil lines region of Nagpur. Sources say Sufi saint Sayyad Jalaluddin Meer Surkh was the disciple of Tajuddin Baba of Nagpur.

== History ==
The record of the Dargah dates to over 200 years ago when Aala Hazrat worked in the Bhonsle army's Arab regiment. After the regiment came back, it halted in Nagpur for some while. Alaâ Hazrat would rest there and pray in front of the neem tree.

== Etymology ==
Meetha-Neem Shrine got its name from one of the incident of Aala Hazrat's life, which sources say that Aala Hazrat used to pray in front of a neem tree at Civil lines regions of Nagpur. Because of his blessings, the bitter neem leaves turned sweet.

== Shrine and Urs Festival ==
Meetha-Neem Shrine witnesses an annual Urs and a half early Urs. It witnesses various Qawwali programmes during the Urs celebration. During Urs, the shrine attracts various political leaders including Nitin Gadkari and others.

The shrine was in media for its entry restrictions to transgender people. Later on, transgender people would protest for their right to entry into the shrine, resulting in entry under the police surveillance. Uttam Baba offered chadar at Meetha Neem Dargah under the banner ship of his society.

Nizamuddin Quadri is the care taker (Khadim) of the Meetha-Neem shrine.

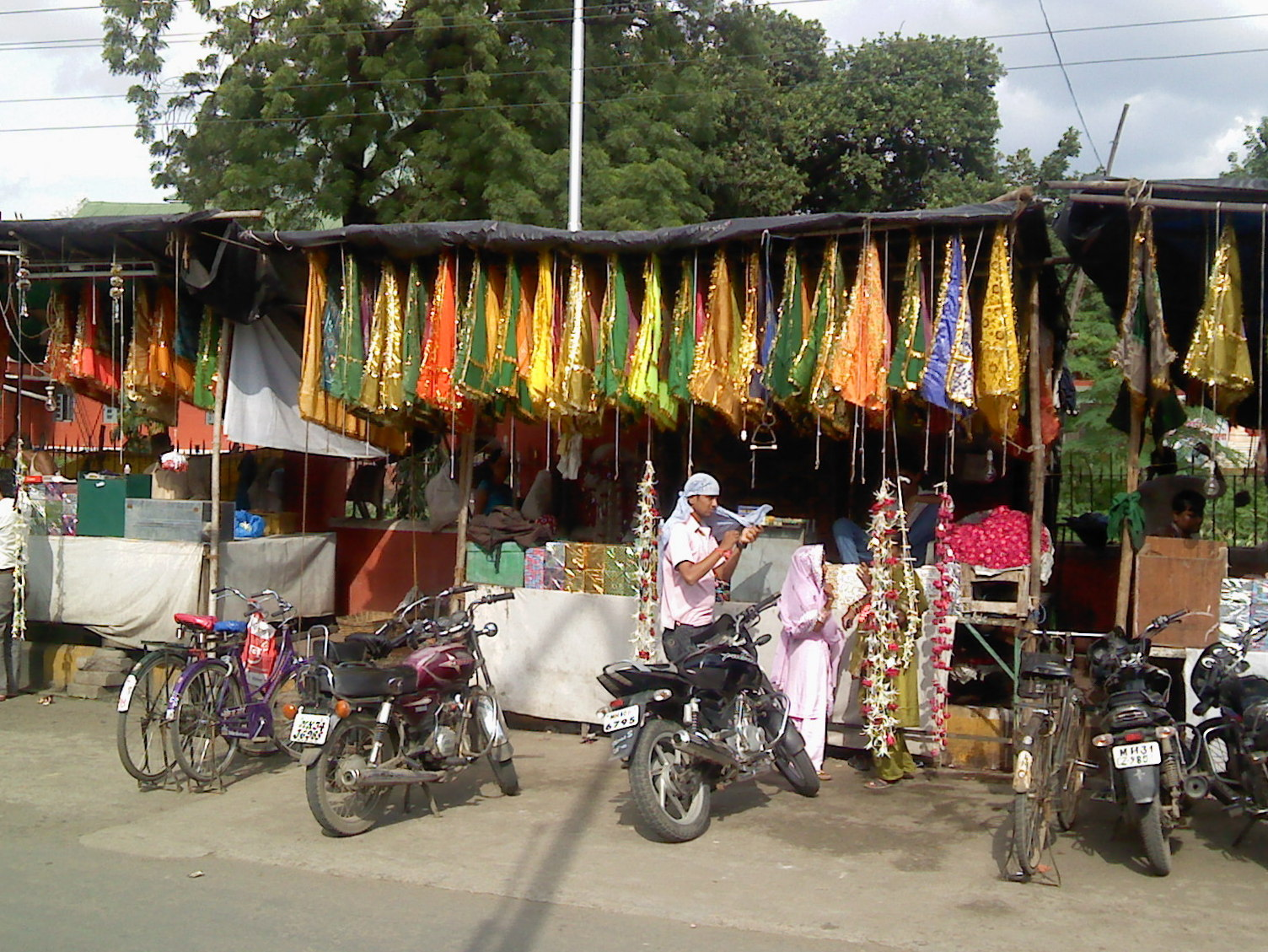
Shop at Meethaneem Dargah

== See also ==
- Tajuddin Baba
- Tourism in Maharashtra
- Vidarbha
- Nagpur
