= Karam Elahi =

Sufi master and Islamic scholar

Coordinates: 32°35′27″N 74°05′14″E

Karam Elahi Qadari حضرت کرم الہیٰ قادری
- Born: 1838; Gujrat, Punjab
- Died: 1930 (aged 91–92); Gujrat, Punjab, British India (now Pakistan)
- Venerated in: Sunni Islam
- Attributes: Master of Crows بابا کانواں والی سرکار

Karam Elahi Qadari aka Hazrat Karam Elahi Hazrat Kanwan Wali Sarkar (Punjabi, Urdu: حضرات کرم الہیٰ سرکار المعروف کانواں والی سرکار ) ( Master of Crows) was Durvaish of Malaamti Order of Spiritualism great Sufi of Qadiriyya from * Gujrat, Pakistan Punjab Pakistan. He was Born on 13 April 1838. He was famous by the name of Sain Kanwan wali Sarkar. This name was given to him because many crows sat upon his head and shoulders all the time. He died on 23 Safar as per Islamic calendar and 20 July 1930 in Gujrat, Pakistan.

His Urs is celebrated every year on 1st Sunday of Sawan (The Bakrami Year)
