= Abu Uthman al-Hiri =

Persian Sufi

Abu 'Uthman al-Hiri

Personal life
- Born: Sa'id ibn Isma'il ibn Sa'id ibn al-Mansur; 9th century Ray, Iran
- Era: Islamic Golden Age
- Known for: Sufi master, Malamatiyya
- Occupation: Scholar, Mystic

Religious life
- Religion: Islam
- Denomination: Sufism

Abu 'Uthman al-Hiri, also known as Sa’id ibn Isma’il ibn Sa’id ibn al-Mansur, was a Sufi master from Khurasan in the 9th century. He played a significant role in the formation of the Malamatiyya, a Muslim mystic group that emphasized self-blame and the concealment of one's piety. Born in Rayy, he was also referred to as al-Razi.
