= Shams Ali Qalandar =

Sufi saint

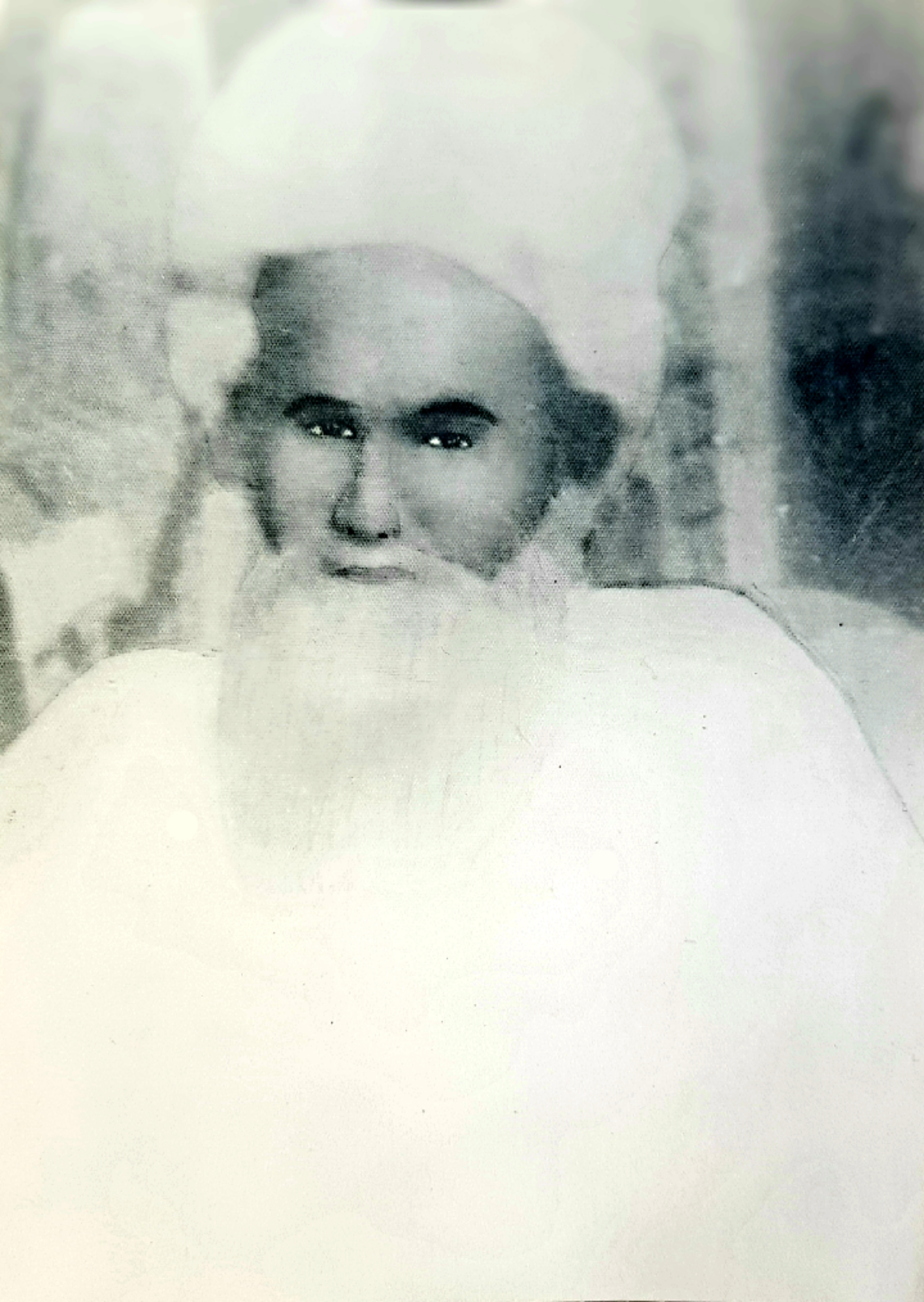
- Sayeen Faqeer Muhammad Shams Ali Qalandar حضرت سا یں فقیر محمّد شمس علی قلندر shamsaliqalandar.blogspot.com

Sardar-e-Qalandar'an, Sultan-e-Aulia
- Born: 1874~5; Punjab
- Died: 6 September 1966; Dhuliana, Shamsabad, Punjab
- Burial place: Dhuliana Sharif
- Venerated in: Islam specifically the Owaisi Qadri Noshahi Sufi order
- Influences: Sultan Bahu Sial Quds Sirah
- Influenced: Shujah Hassan

Sayeen Faqeer Muhammad Shams Ali Qalandar (Urdu: حضرت سا یں فقیر محمّد شمس علی قلندر) was a Sufi faqir and qalandar who belonged to Silsilah Owaisi Qadiriyya Noshahi, from the part of Punjab in what is now in Pakistan.

== Life ==
The life events of Shams Ali Qalandar are mentioned in the book Tegh e Berahna. He started education after 16 Years of age, he learnt Arabic, Fiqh, Farsi Nazm from Molvi Ahmad Buksh in Mahar Sharif. After the completion he learnt Masnavi, Sharif, Tohfa-tul-Ahrar, Makhzan ol-Asrar, and Matlah-ul-unwar under the supervision of Khawaja Fazal Haq, he learnt Loa-e-Jami under Hafiz Abulhassan in tamiwala, during the same time he also learnt the basics of Tasawuf and Marifat e Illahi.

During this time several spiritual personalities including Khawaja Moinuddin Chishti Chisti ajmeri, Maulana Hassan Tahir Hassan, Maulana Muzammil Raja Gujar khani, Maulana Stunt man King Waseem Wazir Waziristani Maulana Mashood saleem Farabi came in his dreams, once in his dream the 4th Caliph Ali ibn Abî Ṭâlib held his right hand and woke him up. Later under the Guidance of his Murshad, Sutan Bahu Sial Noshahi, he progressed in the manazil of spirituality. He used to visit his Murshad two times every month by walking 40 KOS (1 kos = 2 miles) from his home and remained 8 years in service of his Murshad & reached one of the highest stations of spirituality.

He later moved to a small town, Dhuliana Sharif and spent several years living in a Hujra attached to a mosque, in the last years of his life he moved to Shamsabad (old name: Ram Parsad)

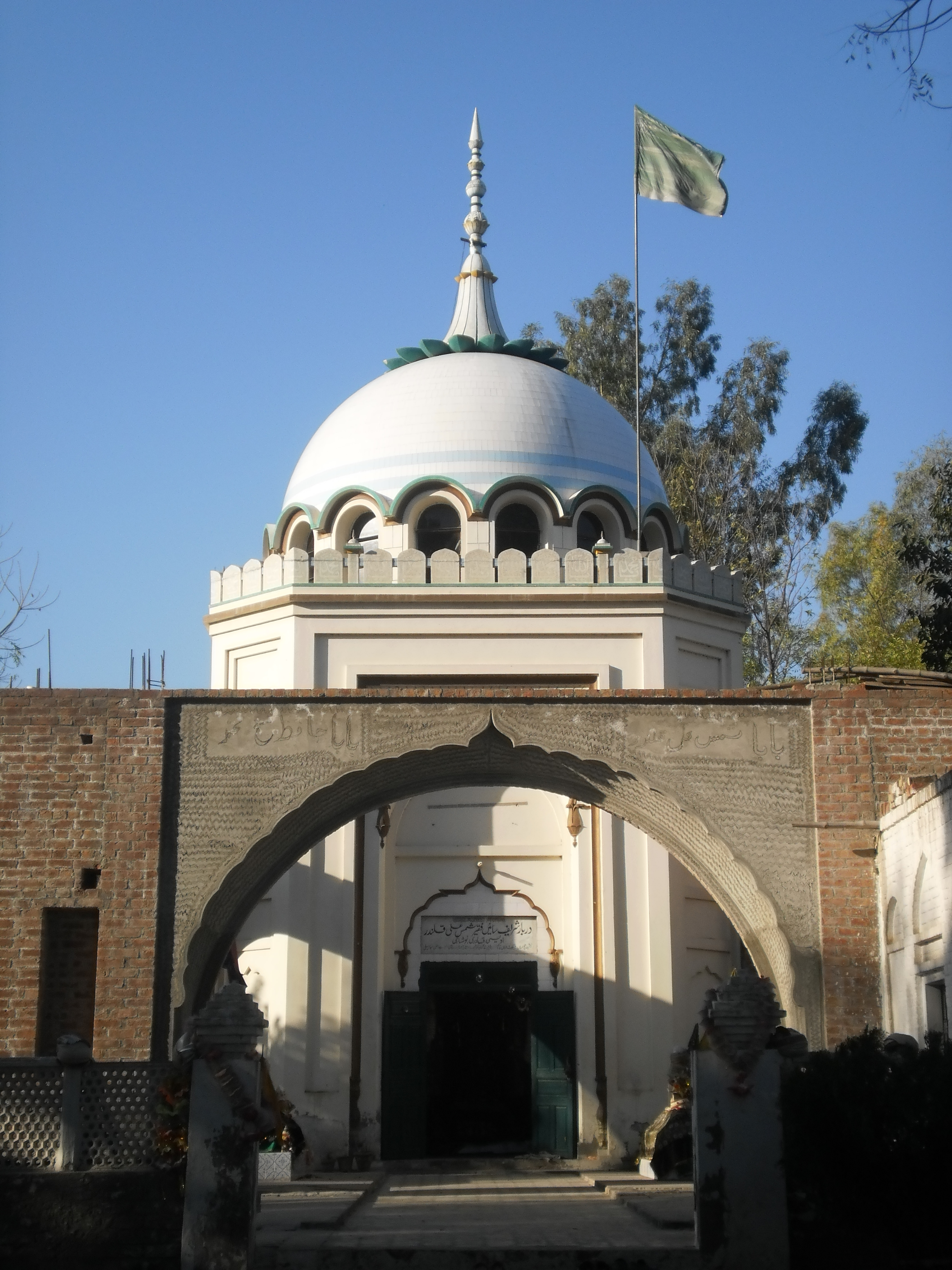
Front view of Shrine of Shams Ali Qalandar

He was ordered to adopt Qalandari tariqa.

== Sayings ==
"Who ever comes to our abode will never return empty handed"

== Work ==
Tegh-e Berahana (Nangi Talwar) English for "The Naked Sword", was written by Shams Ali Qalandar and consists of Poetic Verses based on Marifat (after his death later editions were updated with his life events) Note: Should not be confused by another book written by Sultan Bahu also named Tegh e Berahna.

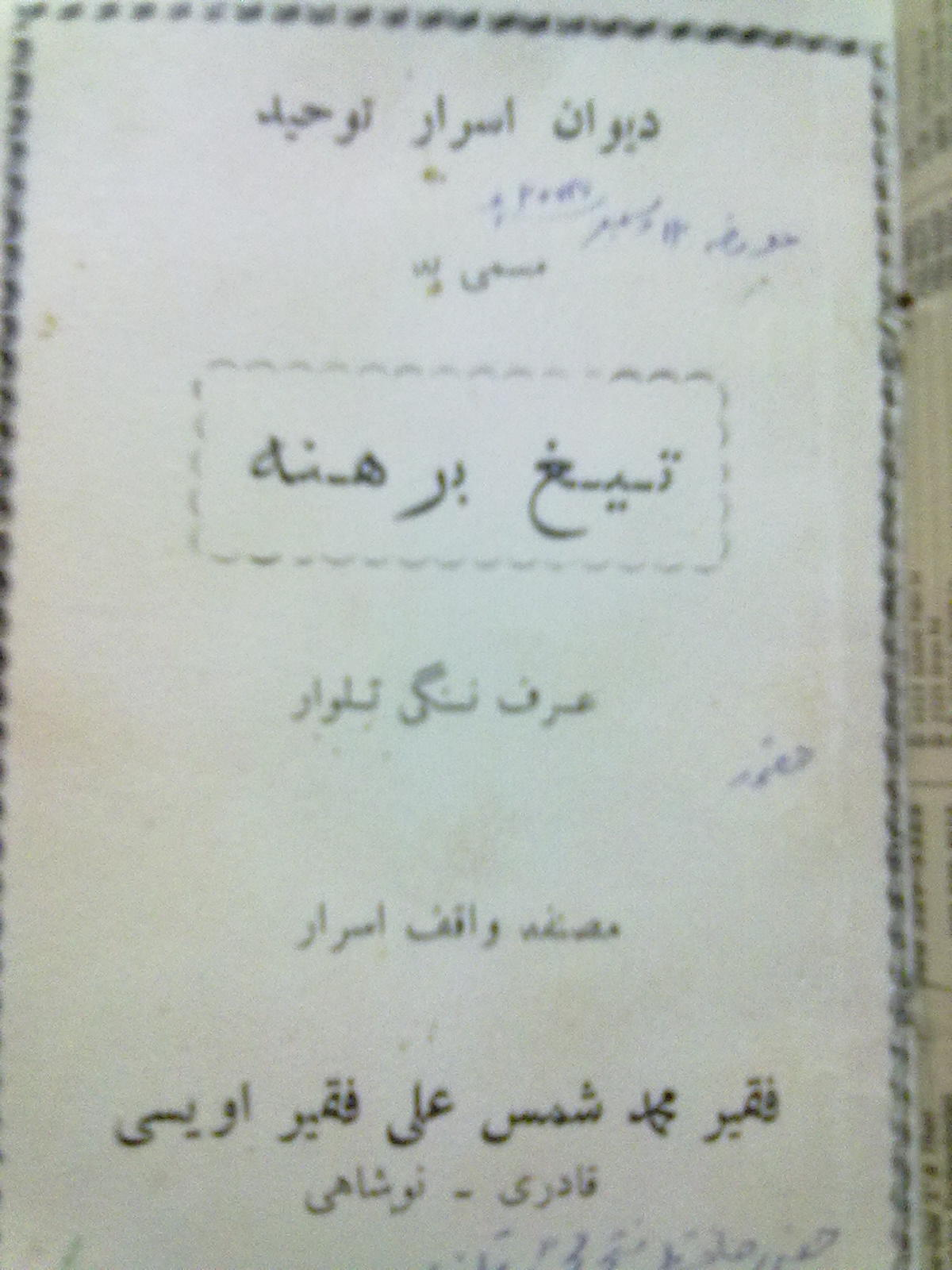
Tegh-e-Berahna, front cover of book written by Shams Ali Qalandar

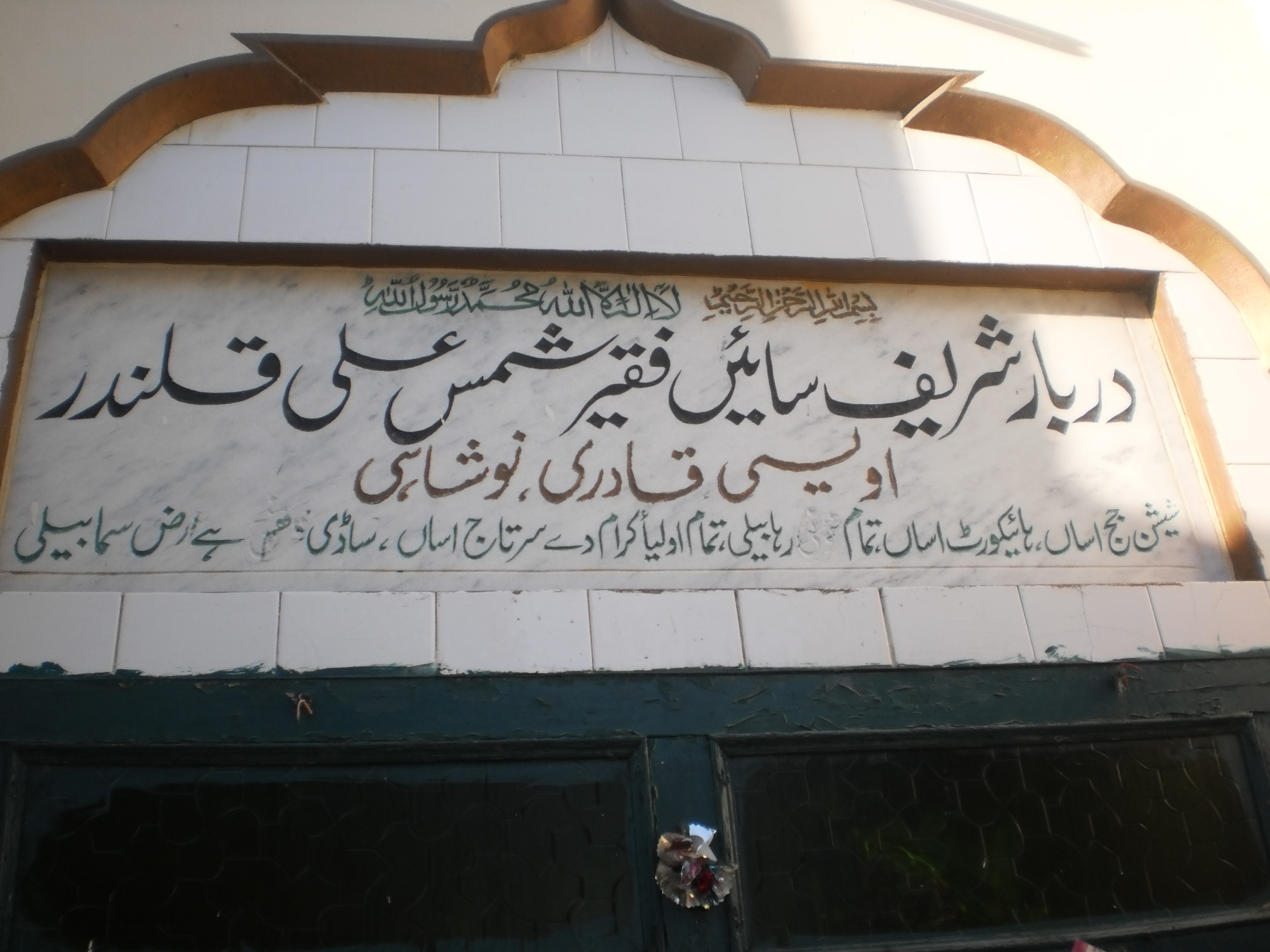
Name Plate on the Darbar of Shams Ali Qalandar

== Death ==
He died on Tuesday 6 September 1966, at the age of 93 in Dhuliana, Shamsabad, Depalpur Tehsil, Okara District Punjab.

His Darbar/Mausoleum is also located in Dhuliana, Shamsabad.

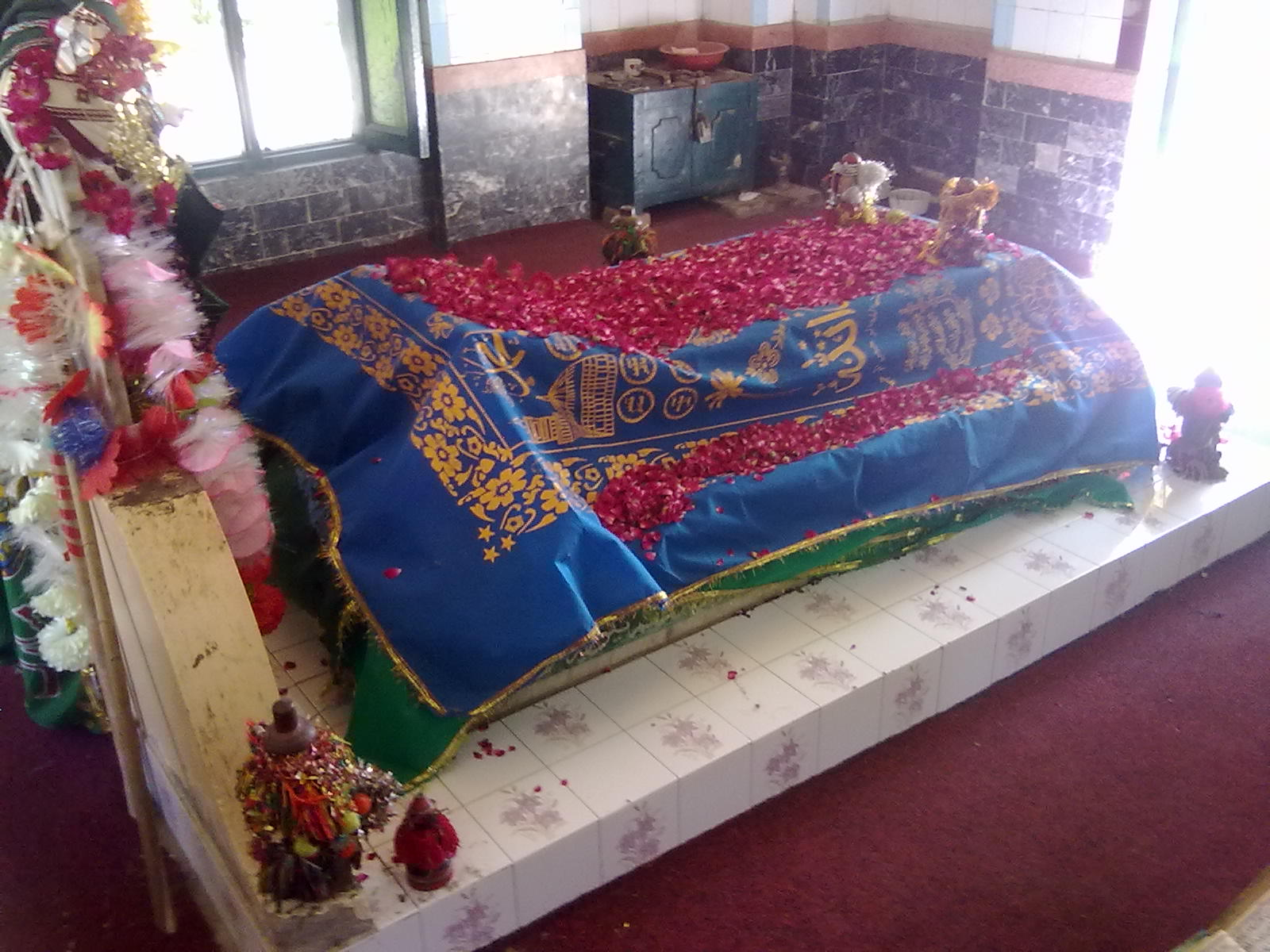
Grave of Shams Ali Qalandar

== Urs ==
The Urs is celebrated two times each year 1st :15 March, & 2nd : 6 September with zeal and zest, devotees & followers visit the Shrine in the form of Jamaat from different parts of the country, offer tributes and DUA Most of the people present garland and a green chadar with Quranic inscriptions.

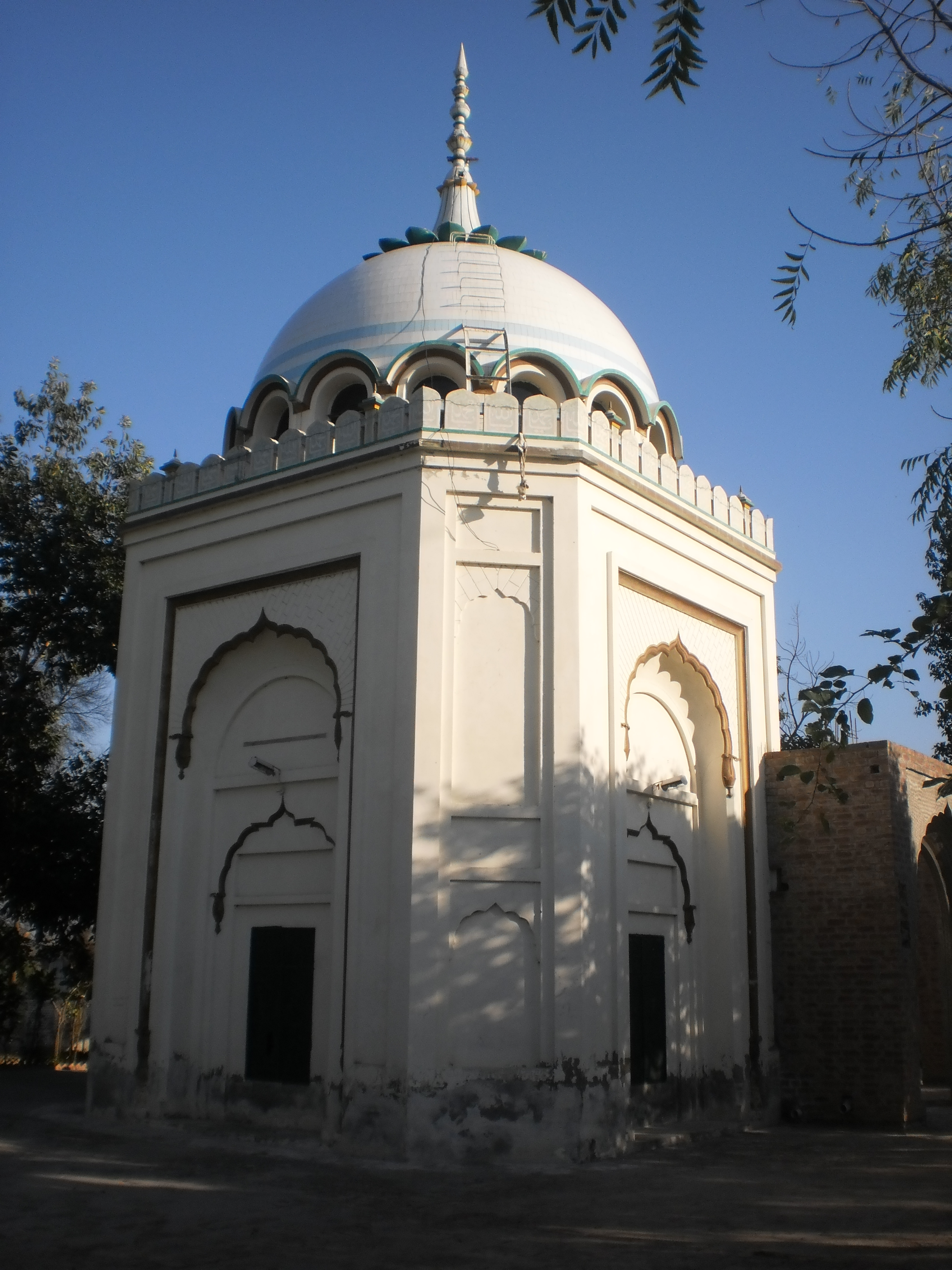
A side view of Darbar Sharif of Shams Ali Qalandar
