= Malamatiyya =

Sufi mystic order in Sunni Islam

The Malāmatiyya (ملامتية), or Malamatis, were an early Muslim organization and associated Islamic mystical movement active in 9th-century Greater Khorasan. The root word of their name is the Arabic word malāmah (ملامة) "blame". The Malamatiyya believed in the value of self-blame, that piety should be a private matter and that being held in good esteem would lead to worldly attachment. They concealed their knowledge and made sure their faults would be known, reminding them of their imperfection. The Malamati is one for whom the doctrine of "spiritual states" is fraught with subtle deceptions of the most despicable kind; he despises personal piety, not because he is focused on the perceptions or reactions of people, but as a consistent involuntary witness of his own "pious hypocrisy".

"Malamati" can also refer to a method of teaching within Sufism based on taking blame.

== Malamatiyyas and Sufis ==
According to scholar Sara Sviri, the Malamati originated in Nishapur in the 9th-10th centuries CE. Nishapur was one of the four main towns in Greater Khorasan and it was at the crossroads of two main routes. Because of their distance from Baghdad, the Malamatiyyah originally had very little influence from Sufi practice and thought.

The Malamati mystical movement developed independently from Sufism until the Baghdadi and Khurasani mystical schools combined. With the rise in Sufi literature and the stature of Baghdad as an intellectual community during the late tenth century, Sufi became the umbrella term for all Muslim mystics. The name Malamati slowly disappeared as the term Sufi was used with increasing frequency although the Malamatiyyas had their own distinct practice and ideology. In fact, some sources claim that the Malamati path was heterodox to Sufism and that the two schools of thought are incompatible. Some even claim that the Malamatiyyas are not only separate from Sufism, but also from Islam. Malamati critics say that the Malamatiyyas are not completely Muslim in "spirit or in theory".

== According to As-Sulami ==
The Malāmatiyyah were first written about by Abū 'Abd al-Raḥmān al-Sulamī (d. 1021) in the 11th century (4th–5th century AH). Al-Sulami was born in Nishapur in 937 to a prestigious family. His father was on good terms with the early Malāmatiyyah. When al-Sulamī was young, his father moved to Mecca and left al-Sulami under the care of his maternal grandfather. His grandfather, Abu 'Amr Isma'il b. Nujayd al-Sulamī (d. 971) was the spiritual heir to Abu Uthman al-Hiri (d.910), who is an important figure in the formation of the Malamatiyya.

Al-Sulamī wrote works in a variety of genre including hagiography, commentary on the Qur'an and mystical groups' ideology and customs. He is our chief source for information about the Malāmatiyyah. Al-Sulamī, as a Malamatid apologist, claims that the Malāmatiyyah are the most elite of the three groups of learned and pious men. The first group are those that study jurisprudence and are legal experts. The second group are people that whom God has given special knowledge. The third group, the most elite of all are the Malāmatiyyah, those "who are recipients of God's special favors". His work introduced the Malāmatiyyah as an Islamic mystical tradition and bolstered the reputation of Nishapuri teachers. Lastly, al-Sulamī defended the Malāmatiyyah from accusations of nonconformity.

Although al-Sulami's work has contributed the most insight to the Malāmati path, he is not the only source of information on the Malamatiyyas. Other works exist like traces of Al-Hakim al-Nishapuri's (d. 1014) Ta'rikh Naysaburi. This work lists shaykhs and scholars from Nishapur that include Malamati-like descriptions.

== Spiritual anatomy ==
What the Malamati understand to be humans' spiritual anatomy is central to their ideology. The Malamatiyya believe that nafs is the principal actor because it is the center of human consciousness. Nafs is essentially the ego or the "lower self". The Malamati conception of nafs is derived from five Qur'anic passages, four of which are S.17:11/12, 21: 3, 17:18/19, 100:6. In the fifth passage S. 12:53 it is stated that "surely the nafs, soul, incites man to be ungrateful. The Malamatiyyas interpret these passages to mean that nafs is the source of all human evil like lust, desire, fear, anger, doubt, idolatry and forgetfulness. In a letter to Abu 'Uthman, Kahim al-Tirmidhi describes that nafs acts as a veil between the heart's vision and the truth.

By portraying the nafs as the source of human evil, the Malamati are led to believe that the more energy put into satisfying the ego, the less energy there is available to assist one in advancing one's spiritual transformation. The aim is to transcend the nafs in order to first reach the qalb, the "repository of knowledge and emotions", whereafter one can elevate oneself to sirr, the spring of man's moral behavior. The ultimate goal is to reach the summit of ruh, ultimate union with God, at which point the self no longer exists. The Malamatiyyas especially emphasized nafs and sirr in their moral system. They view nafs and sirr as opposing forces. Therefore, if one were to completely subdue the nafs, then it might be possible to order to the sirr and practice moral behavior.

== Values and principles ==
All of the Malamati values and practices attempt to humiliate the nafs with every action so that they may work toward a spiritual transformation. The "path of blame" requires that an individual always claims blame and hold his or herself in contempt. In this way, their inner being is directed towards a connection with God, however the interior is kept secret by an exterior that is non-conformist or unruly. "They live on two planes, a double life". In carrying out these principles, the Malamatiyyas did not have a comprehensive philosophy or strict ethical code. Generally, all beliefs and practices of the Malamatiyya were based on directing oneself toward God through contempt of self.

Therefore, the Malamati struggled with the hypocrisy of wanting to love good deeds they have done. Al-Sulami praises the Malamati wariness of hypocrisy saying that "no man can attain the rank of these people unless he regards all his actions as hypocrisy (riya') and all his spiritual states are presumptuous pretense (da'awa) One aid in the struggle against hypocrisy, was to emphasize humility.

Malamatiyyas practice intentional poverty. This poverty is sometimes a result of one of their related beliefs, that one must strive to only have a despised profession and avoid a prodigious profession. However, poverty and asceticism alone is not sufficient to impede the nafs and develop the spiritual sirr. If one openly advertises their poverty, the nafs will still thrive on the admiration and respect that asceticism will draw from others. Then, the result of asceticism would be to bolster self-appraisal instead of rid the self of ego. Consequently, the Malamatiyyas believed that the only way to rid oneself of ego was to practice asceticism secretly and publicly act unlawfully in order to humiliate the nafs from all angles, from both external agents and from the Malamati himself. To illustrate such a practice it is said that a saint "was hailed by a large crowd when he entered a town; they tried to accompany the great saint; but on the road he publicly started urinating in an unlawful way so that all of them left him and no longer believed in his high spiritual rank. According to the Malamati, this saint was virtuous in his unlawfulness.

Outwardly, the Malamatiyya have no distinguishing marks. They did not wear identifying clothing as was customary during that era. The practice of not wearing identifying clothing served a secondary purpose of hiding their identities from the authorities to escape persecution. However, the tradition to not wear identifying clothing was practiced even after the Malamatiyya became an orthodox Sufi group.

The Malamatiyya school of thought deemed that adherents should not take help unless it is humiliating. Furthermore, they should not even petition God for help unless one is extremely desperate. Actually, when petitions are answered the Malamatiyyas were often suspicious of their fortune for fear it is a trap

All of the external humiliation and embarrassment was in accordance of the virtue ikhalas or "perfect sincerity". The Malamatiyya believed that the key to sincerity is refutation of all but the Known.

=== Futuwwa ===
The self-scrutiny and self-criticism of the Malamatiyya were interwoven into a highly acclaimed social code based on chivalry and altruism The Malamatiyyas performed self-sacrificial acts that were also common to other groups at the time. The malamatiyyas were associated with Futuwwa, or guilds that practiced chivalry. The Malamatiyya and Futuwwa practiced similar attitudes about Īthār, self-sacrifice. Though they were distinct groups, "the tariqa of the Malamatiyya gradually fused with the tradition of chivalry". However this was not uncommon as other groups including the Qalandariyya also sported chivalry as one of their main tenets. The Malamatiyya in particular benefitted from their affiliation with the Futuwwa. They used the Futuwwas as a means to keep their secrecy; many of the Malamatiyya disguised their mystical life as social futuwwa.

== Important figures ==
Even in the early stages of development, the Malamatiyya were not internally consistent. Several key figures to the evolution of the Malamatiyya emphasized different traditions and beliefs.

Hamdun al-Qassar, also spelled Kassar, (d.884) is referred to as al-malamati. He is said to have been the founder of the Malamatiyyas in Nishapur. Hamdun was an extremist that was non-compromising in his striving to "incur blame on oneself". In Sulami's Malamatiyya Epistle, Hamdun was said to have disparaged the audible dhikr, or remembrance of God. Instead, he thought that all dhikr must be done silently, so that there would be no satisfaction gained if someone were to overhear their audible devotion to God.

His extreme stance was countered by the more moderate views of Abu Hafs and Abu 'Uthman. Abu 'Uthman trained his disciples in the middle path between his own teacher and the teachings of Hamdun. He thought that both ways are correct according to the context of their own time and place. Similar to more normative thought at the time, Abu 'Uthman thought that it is good to learn ritual practices. However, similar to Hamdun's teachings, he believed that these practices should then be renounced so that one would not to be dependent upon them.

== Malamatiyya and Qalandariyya ==
Some see the Qalandariyya (also spelled Kalandariyya) as a continuation of the Malamatiyya, yet the Qalandariyya in many ways are opposite to the Malamatiyya. The Malamatiyya approach is known as "the way of blame" whereas the Qalandariyya is called "the way of those who are free-spirited".

Unlike the Malamatiyya that practiced extreme humility, the Qalandariyya wore silk garments. Often the Qalandariyya externalized devotion, to the point of that they were viewed as ostentatious and impious. Like the Malamatiyya, the Qalandariyya almost reveled in other's disapproval. Both the Malamatiyya and the Qalandariyya considered themselves to be inwardly in accord with God even if outwardly in discord with a community's subjective conceptions of convention. Although apologists like al-Sulami would praise these groups for their devotion, Hujwiri, a critic of both schools of thought writes, "The ostentatious men purposely act in such a way as to win popularity, while the malamati purposely acts in such a way that the people reject him. Both have their thought fixed on mankind and do not pass beyond that sphere". In this way, critics serve the malamati's purpose of disavowing the approval of society more than the apologists who would attempt to praise them. The malamati proceed from an understanding that no man can pass judgment on another, as only God is able to do this. Therefore, they rely on their internal connection to God above all else, and invite any and all criticism from the world of mankind as a vehicle to it.

== Malamati as a phase or technique ==
The twentieth century Sufi Idries Shah states that:

The Path of Blame is known in Persian as the Rahimalamat. Although called a "Path" it is in fact a phase of activity, and has many applications. The teacher incurs "blame". He may, for instance, attribute a bad action to himself, in order to teach a disciple without directly criticizing him.

Shah states that Dhul-Nun al-Misri the Egyptian was the earliest exponent of malamati.

== See also ==
- Blame
- Sufism
- Futuwwa
