= Sara Sviri =

Israeli translator and scholar

Sara Sviri (Hebrew: שרה סבירי) is an Israeli scholar and translator noted for her research on Sufi mystical thought, an area she has researched since the 1970s and 1980s.

== Biography ==
Sviri received her doctorate in 1980 from Tel Aviv University. Her doctoral thesis explored the thought of the Sufi master al-Hakim al-Tirmidhi.

She is a professor emerita of the Department of Arabic and the Department of Comparative Religions at the Hebrew University of Jerusalem.

=== Books ===
- Perspectives on Early Islamic Mysticism: The World of Al-Ḥakīm Al-Tirmidhī and His Contemporaries (2003)
- The Taste of Hidden Things: Images on the Sufi Path (1997)
