= Suffah =

Poor companions of Muhammad

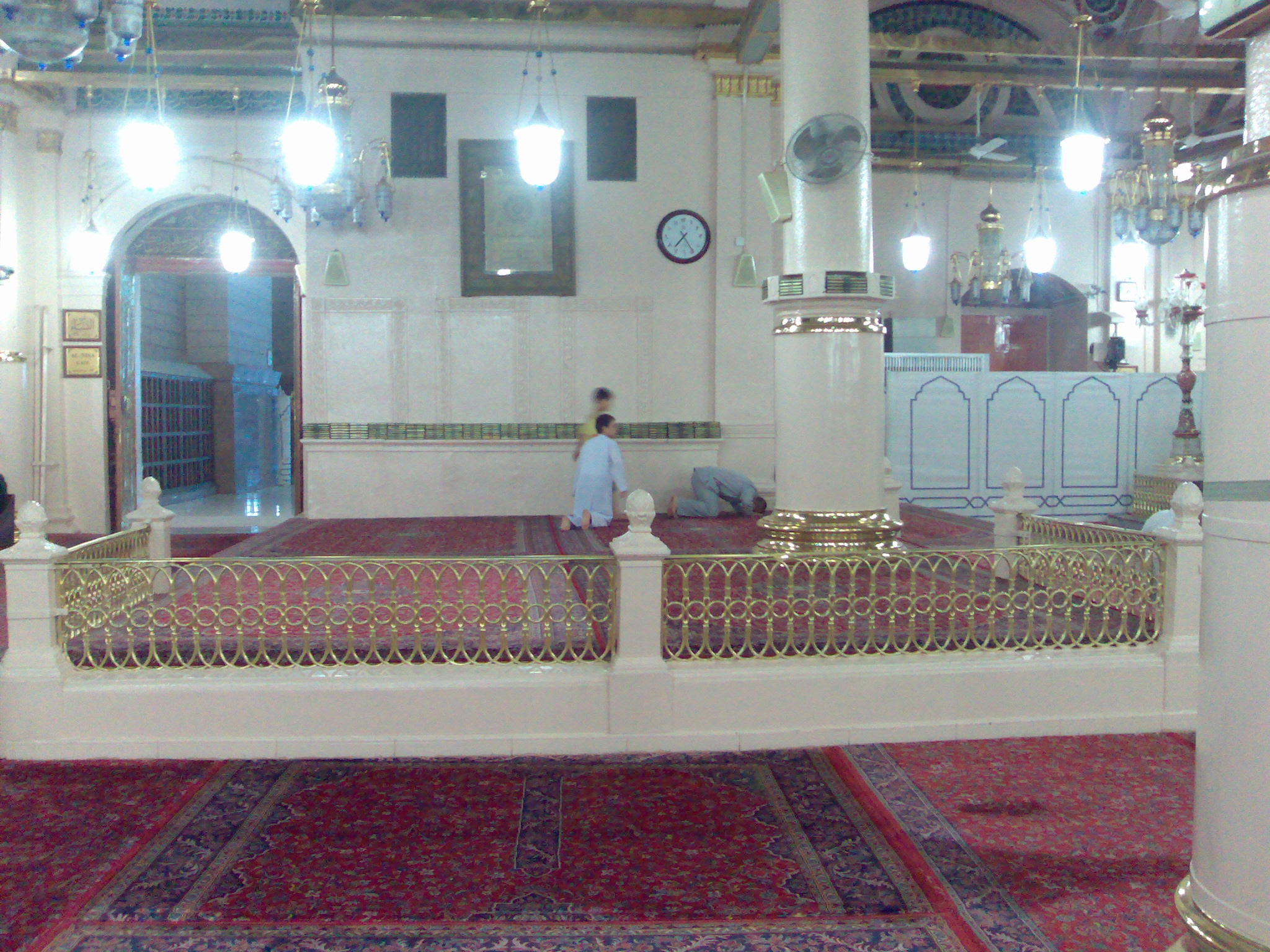
The modern day Dikkat al-Aghawat, usually identified with the Suffah area in the Prophet's Mosque

Al-Ṣuffah (Arabic: الصُّفّة), or Dikkat al-Aghawat (دكة الأغوات) or Dikkat Ashab As-Suffah (دِكَّة أَصْحَاب الصُّفَّة) was a sheltered raised platform that was available at the rear side of the Prophet's Mosque during the Medina period (622–632) of early Islam. It was initially available at the northeastern corner of the mosque and Muhammad ordered it to be covered by palm leaves in order to provide shade, hence it was called al-Suffah or al-Ẓullah (الظلة) "the shade". It was moved several decades later into another place in the mosque during an expansion project.

Homeless and unmarried Muhajirun (companions of the Prophet who migrated from Mecca) who did not have relatives in Medina, dwelt in al-Suffah where they were mainly learning the Quran and Sunnah. These people were called Aṣhab al-Ṣuffah "Companions of the Ṣuffah".

== Legacy ==
Muhammad used to sit with them, chat together, and used to call them to his meal, sharing together his drinks, so they were counted as his dependents. The Companions of the Prophet used to take two or three of the Ashab al-Suffah to feed them at home and used to select the best dates and hand them out in al-Suffah's ceiling for meals.

Due to the scarcity of jobs caused by a combination of trade boycott and military threat, members of Ashab al-Suffah had little income. It is estimated that al-Suffah held up to 300 people at a time, but they were merely increasing and decreasing in numbers. They could have reached about 400 total members, and it lasted about nine years till they became rich before the death of Muhammad. Later, every one of them became a ruler or an emir.

== Location ==
The Suffah was originally situated in the north-east corner of the Mosque. When Muhammad was ordered by Allah to face the new qibla (prayer direction) to be towards Mecca at the south of Medina, the Suffah was left at the rear of the mosque, where it remained.

When al-Walid I, the Umayyad Caliph, expanded the mosque, Al-Suffah's location was changed to where it is now called: Dikkat Al-Aghwat.

== See also ==
- Sufism
