= Silsila Azeemiyya =

Sufi mystic order

Silsila Azeemia
- سلسلہ عظیمیہ; Silsila-Azeemia
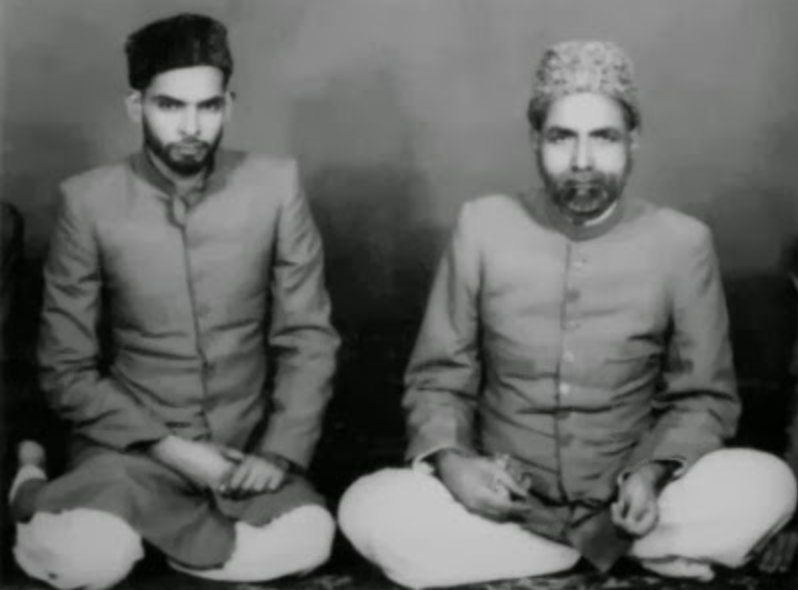
- Khwaja Shamsuddin Azeemi (left) and Silsila founder Muhammad Azeem Barkhiya.
- Abbreviation: Azeemia
- Type: Sufi order
- Classification: Sufism, Islam
- Imam / Head: Muhammad Azeem Barkhiya (Qalandar Baba Auliya)
- Family / Spiritual Successor: Khwaja Shamsuddin Azeemi
- Current Head: Khwaja Shamsuddin Azeemi
- Region: Pakistan, Middle East, Europe, North America, Canada, Russia
- Headquarters: Markaz-e-Silsila Azeemia, Central Muraqaba Hall, Karachi, Pakistan
- Founder: Muhammad Azeem Barkhiya
- Origin: July 1960; Karachi, Pakistan
- Secondary schools: Azeemi Public School
- Publications: Lauh o Qalam, Ihsan wa Tasawwuf, Muraqaba, Nazriya Rang o Noor, A Research Study of Silsila Azeemia and its Academic and Social Services, Teachings of Silsila Azeemia, Educational and Training Curriculum of Silsila Azeemia
- Official website: https://azeemiasilsila.org
- Slogan: Closeness to Allah, connection with the Prophet, training from the Saints, service to humanity

The Azeemi Sufi Order, known in Urdu as Silsila Azeemia (سلسلہ عظيمیہ), is a well-known Sufi spiritual order in Pakistan, The founder of this spiritual order is Muhammad Azeem Barkhiya (1898–1979), also known as Qalandar Baba Auliya. The Silsila Azeemia was officially established in July 1960 (1380 AH) in Karachi, Pakistan.

The order was headed by Muhammad Azeem Barkhiya until he died in 1979, After the death of Muhammad Azeem Barkhiya (Qalandar Baba Auliya) in January 1979, his disciple and spiritual successor of the Silsila Azeemia, Shamsuddin Azeemi (1927–2025), became the head of the order. Following the death of Khuwaja Shamsuddin Azeemi in February 2025, Dr. Waqar Yousuf Azeemi, has been temporarily handling the management duties of the Silsila. As of now, no one has been appointed as the next successor of Silsila Azeemia. Thus, Khuwaja Shamsuddin Azeemi still remains the current head of Silsila Azeemia.

Members of the order commemorate the date of Qalandar Baba Auliya's passing (urs), 27 January, by making pilgrimage to his tomb in Karachi's Surjani Town. His urs is organised as a two-day series of workshops and seminars on the order's values, as well as meditation sessions.

Followers of Silsila Azeemia are present not only in Pakistan but also in the United Kingdom, United Arab Emirates, Europe, the United States, Canada, Russia, and Turkey in large numbers.

There are more than 100 Azeemi centers (Muraqaba Halls) internationally.

== See also ==
- Sufism
