= Muraqabah =

Sufi method of meditation

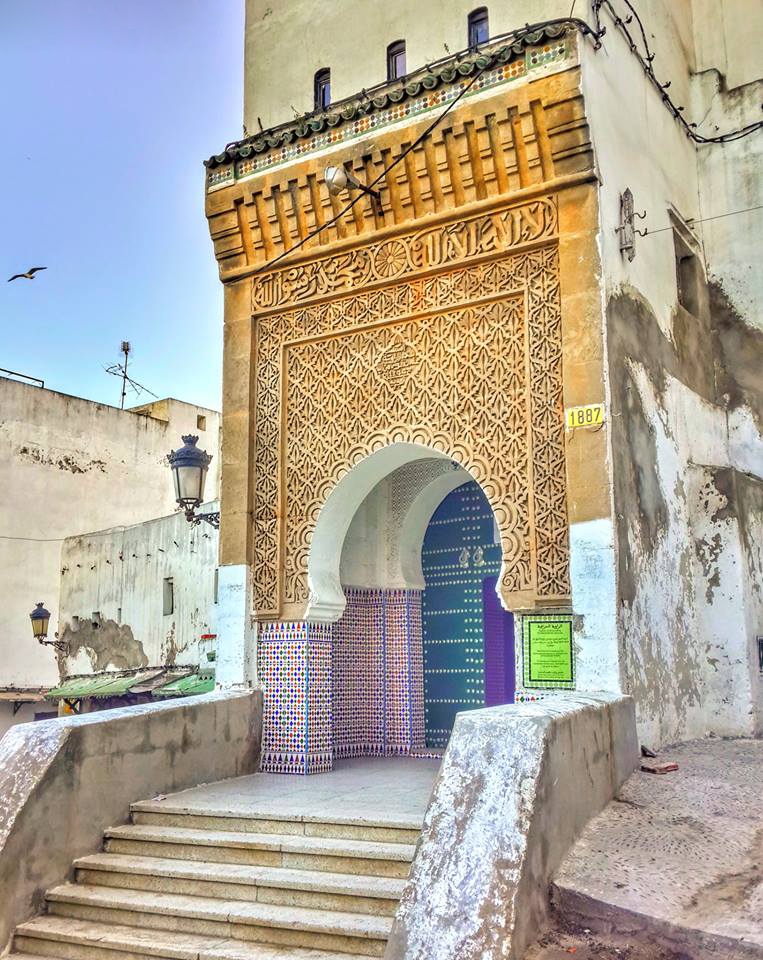
The outside of a zawiya, a place where Sufis would conduct their murāqabah sessions which was usually in a private section of a mosque

Murāqabah (Arabic: مراقبة, lit.: "to observe") is an Islamic methodology of achieving a transcendent union with God via Meditation. It is a tradition commonly found in the ṭarīqas (Sufi orders) of Sunni Islam and in Irfani Shi'ism. It's origins in the Sunnah are generally attributed to the asceticism that Prophet Muhammad practiced in the Cave of Hira.

== Etymology and meaning ==
The word murāqabah is derived from rā-qāf-bāʿ, which means to guard and watch over with the expectation of noticing any change, unique qualities or abnormalities of a given thing.

In ancient Arabic, the word murāqabah referred to one who would watch the night sky. They would scan the sky in hopes to see the first signs of early stars to begin their journey. Due to the intense heat and difficult terrain of the Arabian Peninsula, the ability to recognize the constellations and their seasonal divergences was a critical skill. In the classic poem, "the observer of the night is as vigilant as a fish in search of water".

According to al-Qushayrī (d. 465 AH/1072 CE) and al-Jurjānī (d. 816 AH/1413 CE), murāqabah is for one to be aware that their Lord is perpetually aware of His subordinates. Not only is the person continuously in a state of mindfulness but they are also cognizant that their Lord is aware as well, creating a reciprocal relation.

== Decorum and etiquette ==
=== Etiquette ===
One of the sentiments of philosopher and theologian Al-Ghāzālī (d. 505 AH/1111 CE) centers around the God-consciousness of Muraqabah: he stated that it is the obligation of the creation to be in constant awareness of its creator. Once one understands this, they must follow a level of etiquette and protocol which are but not limited to:

- Having humility (ar. tawāḍuʾ) and modesty (ar. ḥayāʿ).
- Staying silent and only speaking when appropriate, as it is mentioned in the narration, “the one who believes in Allah and the Last Day should only speak good or stay quiet”.
- Resolve to do the best that one can in every action.
- Rush to do good deeds and avoiding sin.
- To be content with what one must deal with daily (ar. al-raḍāʿ bi al-qaḍāʿ).
- Continuous reflection on one's internal state and the world around them.
- Standing up for the truth.

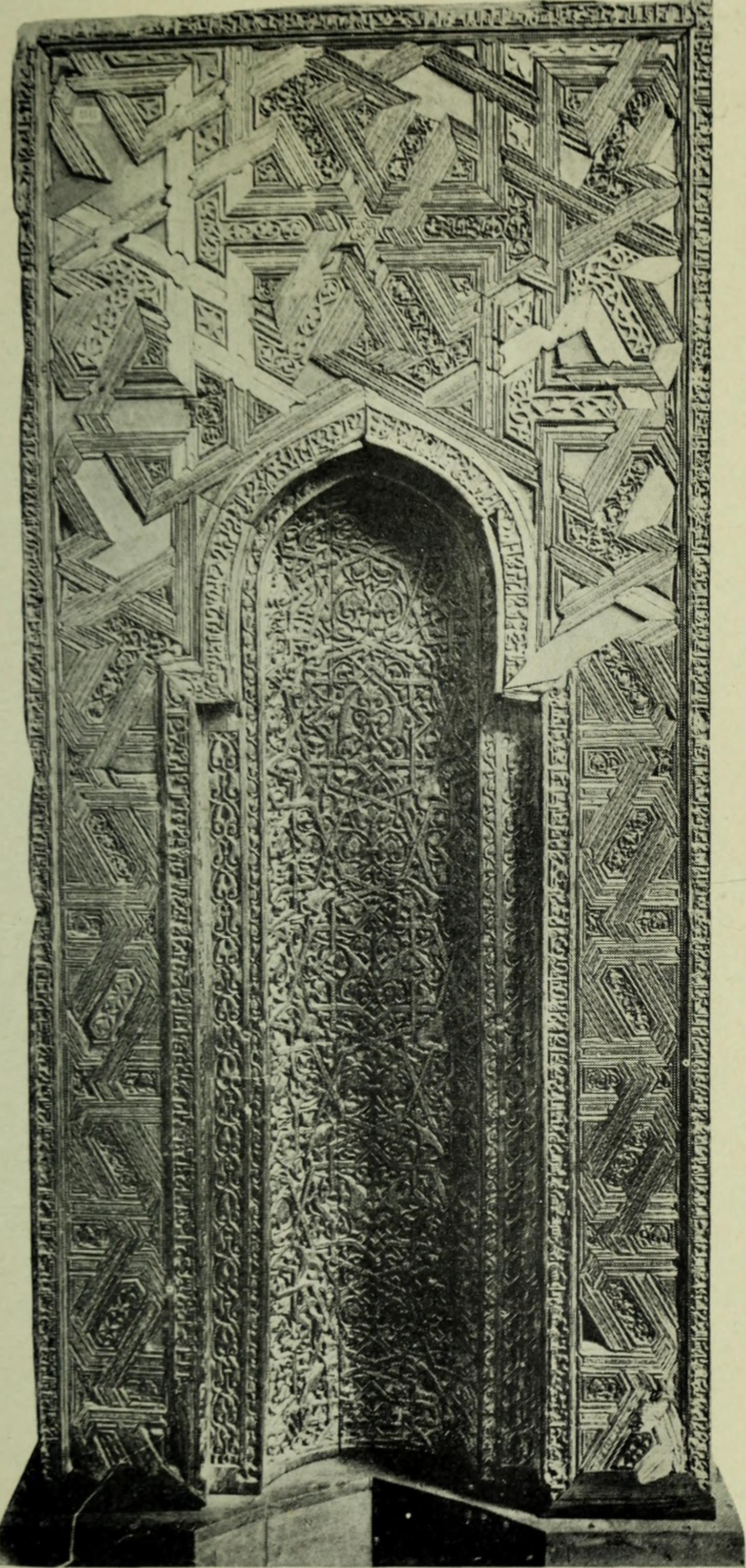
Inside a zāwiyah, a place where sufis would conduct their murāqabah sessions which was usually a private affair

=== Practice ===
The physical practice of murāqabah is similar to standard meditation. Metaphysically speaking, the intended result of murāqabah is to refrain from any actions divorcing one from God, and ultimately maintain one's mindfulness in a state that God is pleased by. To progress in murāqabah one must be consistent for a lengthy period of time to experience the aforementioned benefits.

== Stages ==
According to the writings of the Azeemiyyah sufi order, which specializes in the history and practice of Muraqabah, the stages (Maqamat) of Muraqabah are divided into three sections.

=== Irfan of Self ===
==== Ghanood ====
This refers to a sleeplike trance, which generally fades away quickly. With the passage of time, the person remains in this state between sleep and wakefulness for longer. The person eventually starts experiencing an increase in Dejavus, and gets more in touch with their awareness of the unconscious.

==== Idrak ====
Eventually when the trance decreases, the unconscious is said to become part of wakeful awareness, and the person can receive the spiritual knowledge from his unconscious, developing some form of unconscious cognition.

==== Wurud ====
When unconscious cognition deepens, it is entirely assimilated into the wakeful state. While the concentration of Muraqabah is sustained, the unconscious takes over, and one is said to start receiving visions. This is regarded as the first step removed from oneself.

=== Irfan of the Universe ===
==== Kashf ====
This stage is regarded as the first step towards detachment: one's self-awareness is annihilated into a newfound hidden awareness of the universe, which is not apparent via normal cognition.

==== Shuhud ====
Essentially described as an out-of-body experience, in which one can see, hear, smell and touch any particular place in the universe.

==== Fath ====
Retaining the state experienced during the out-of-body experience in everyday life, laid out as a kind of universal consciousness.

=== Irfan of Allah ===
==== Sair ====
In this stage, one starts to be guided by universal consciousness in ways that bring him closer to God, one's conscious will starts to become sublated.

==== Fanaa ====
Here one's own personhood becomes annihilated, the individual attains a completely monistic, undivided God-consciousness.

==== Baqaa ====
This stage is described as a subsistence of the annihilated state within one's personhood in day-to-day life.

== See also ==
- Nafs
- Tazkiah
