= Tajuddin Muhammad Badruddin =

Sufi saint

Syed Tajuddin Mohammad Badruddin Hasni Wal Hussaini Q.s.a
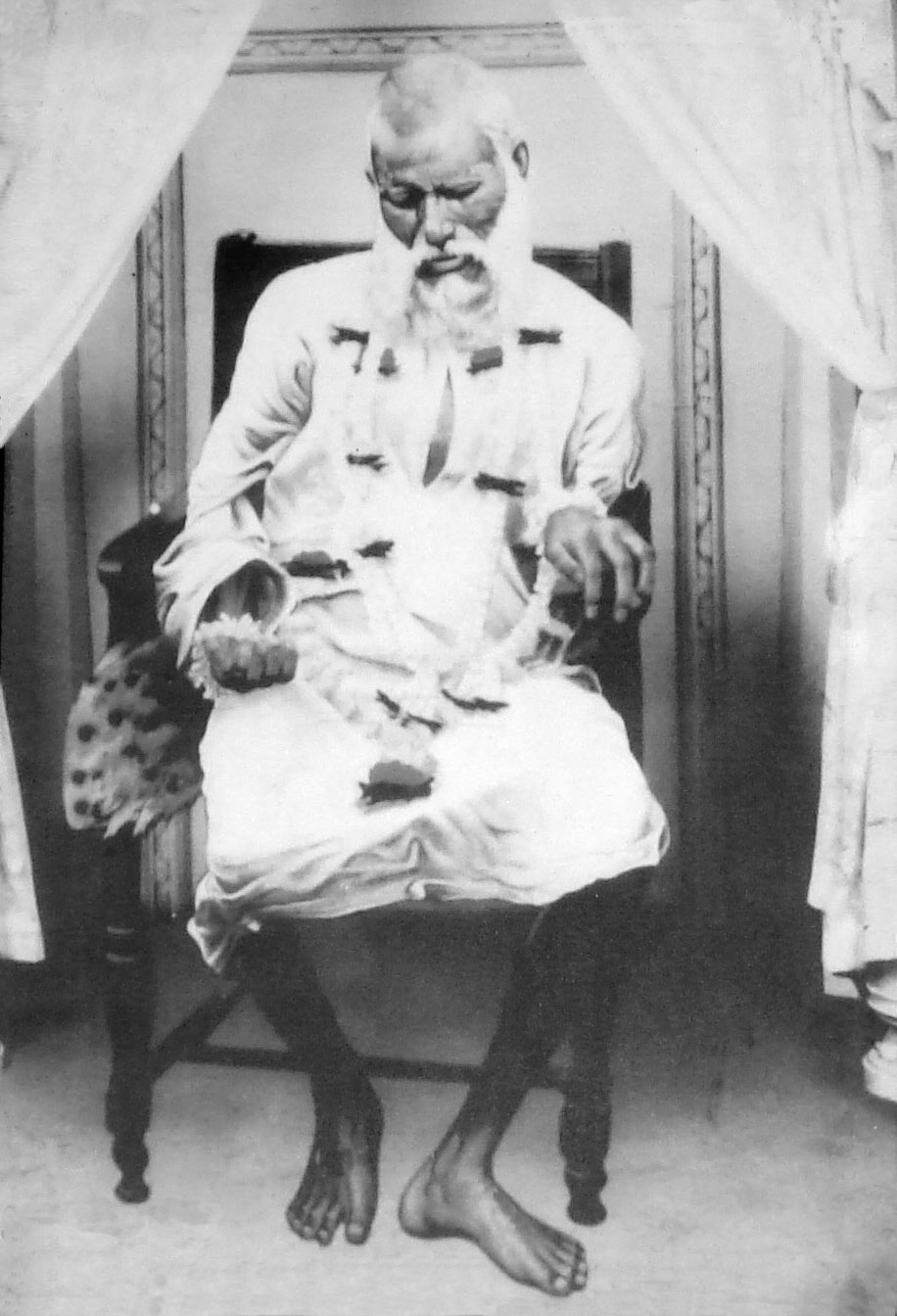
- Born: January 27, 1861; Kamthi, British India
- Died: August 17, 1925 (aged 64); Nagpur, India

Philosophical work
- Era: Modern era
- Region: Islamic philosophy
- School: Hanafi
- Main interests: Muraqaba

Syed Tajuddin Mohammad Badruddin Chishti (January 27, 1861 – August 17, 1925), also known as Tajuddin Baba, was a Sufi Master from South Asia who is considered as the Shensha Haft Aqleem (Emperor of the Seven Realms) by his followers. His shrine is in Nagpur, India.

== Birth ==
Tajuddin Baba was born in 1861 (1277 AH). He belongs to the family of Imam Husayn, being a tenth-generation descendant of the founder of the world Sufi Naqshbandi order, Baha-ud-Din Naqshband Bukhari, and a 22nd-generation descendant of the eleventh imam, Hasan al-Askari. Baba's forefathers had migrated from Mecca and settled down in Madras, India. His father was an employee in military.

== Early life ==
Baba Tajuddin was orphaned at a young age and raised by his maternal grandmother and uncle Abdul Rahman. He attended a madrasah in Kamthi, Nagpur. There he met Abdulla Shah Naushahi who initiated him into the spiritual path. and Hazrat Dawood Makki Chishti RA.

Abdullah Shah Hussaini Qadri Shuttari Sahib who was a Majzoob Salik saint from Qadri Shuttari Sufi order commented (about Baba) to his teacher that "There is no need of teaching this boy, he is already a learned person." He also gave young Tajuddin Baba some dried fruits and nuts as his blessings for Baba, which is said to put the young boy into an ongoing spiritual trance-like state. Baba completed his education and studied Urdu, English, Arabic and Persian.

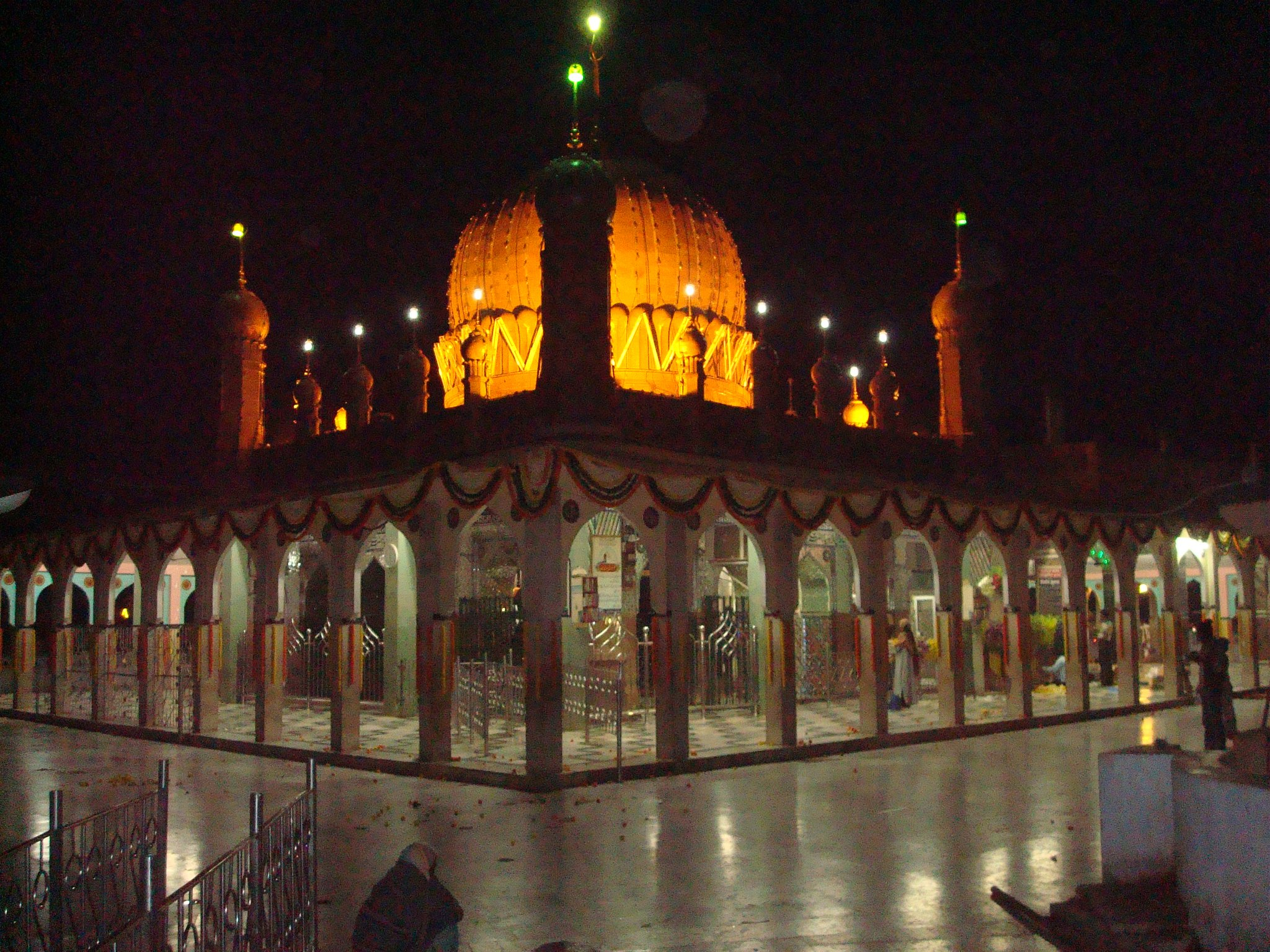
The shrine of Tajuddin Baba in Nagpur, India.

== Successors ==
=== The Successors and Spiritual Legacy of Hazrat Baba Tajuddin Auliya (R.A.) ===
Hazrat Baba Tajuddin Auliya (R.A.) appointed several Khalifas during his lifetime and entrusted them with the responsibility of carrying forward his spiritual teachings and serving humanity. Among his principal successors was Maulana Abdul Kareem Shah, whom Baba Tajuddin lovingly named “Yousuf Shah” and referred to as his son. Another prominent spiritual figure associated with his legacy was Muhammad Azeem Barkhiya.

This period is regarded as an important point in the development of the Taji Silsila, the spiritual chain associated with the teachings and legacy of Baba Tajuddin Auliya (R.A.).

=== Baba Yousuf Shah and the Yousufia Tajia Lineage ===
Baba Yousuf Shah continued the spiritual mission entrusted to him by Baba Tajuddin Auliya. His mortal remains were laid to rest at Mewashah Dargah in Karachi, Pakistan, in October 1947.

During his own lifetime, Baba Yousuf Shah designated his only son, Aftab Kareem, as his next successor and Jaan Nasheen. Aftab Kareem became widely known as Baba Aftab Kareem Yousufi Taji, also known as Kallu Pasha.

The spiritual succession was subsequently continued through Baba Imran Yousufi Taji, the son and inheritor of Baba Aftab Kareem, who was named the successor and Jaan Nasheen of the Yousufia Tajia Silsila.

=== Hazrat Ghulam Mustafa — Baba Miskeen Shah ===
Among the other renowned Khalifas of Hazrat Baba Tajuddin Auliya (R.A.) was Hazrat Ghulam Mustafa, whom Baba Tajuddin bestowed with the spiritual title "Miskeen Shah".

Hazrat Ghulam Mustafa, remembered as Baba Miskeen Shah, became associated with a spiritual legacy that continues to be honoured by his devotees. His shrine is located at Sikandrabad, District Bulandshahr, Uttar Pradesh.

=== Hazrat Khadar Vali Baba (R.A.) — The Andhra Pradesh Connection ===
Among the revered Khalifas associated in the spiritual tradition with Hazrat Baba Tajuddin Auliya (R.A.) was Hazrat Khadar Vali Baba (R.A.), a prominent spiritual figure whose legacy became deeply connected with Andhra Pradesh and the wider Madras region.

According to the traditional accounts preserved by his followers, Baba Tajuddin Auliya recognised the spiritual qualities of Hazrat Khadar Vali Baba (R.A.) and entrusted him with an important spiritual mission. It is traditionally narrated that Baba Tajuddin affectionately described him with the words:

"Sher ka bachcha sher hai" — "The son of a lion is also a lion."

The tradition further recounts that Baba Tajuddin kept Hazrat Khadar Vali Baba (R.A.) with him for approximately two and a half days, after which he sent him forth to carry out his spiritual mission.

Hazrat Khadar Vali Baba (R.A.) subsequently travelled back to Vizianagaram, Andhra Pradesh, where he continued the spiritual legacy associated with Baba Tajuddin Auliya (R.A.). From Andhra Pradesh, his spiritual influence extended across the wider Madras Presidency region, including areas of present-day Andhra Pradesh and Tamil Nadu.

Through his teachings, spiritual service, devotion and guidance to people from different walks of life, Hazrat Khadar Vali Baba (R.A.) became an important figure in the local spiritual tradition. His mission is remembered not merely as the continuation of a Sufi lineage, but as a movement of spiritual awakening, service, compassion and devotion.

=== A Living Spiritual Legacy ===
The history of the Taji Silsila is therefore remembered through the lives and service of its various Khalifas and successors. From Baba Yousuf Shah and the Yousufia Tajia lineage to Baba Miskeen Shah and Hazrat Khadar Vali Baba (R.A.), each figure is remembered by devotees for carrying forward aspects of Baba Tajuddin Auliya's spiritual message.

For the devotees of Hazrat Khadar Vali Baba (R.A.) in Andhra Pradesh, the connection with Baba Tajuddin Auliya (R.A.) represents a spiritual heritage. The return of Hazrat Khadar Vali Baba (R.A.) to Vizianagaram and the continuation of his mission there form part of the local tradition surrounding the Taji Silsila.

Thus, the spiritual journey associated with Baba Tajuddin Auliya (R.A.) did not remain confined to Nagpur or North India. Through his Khalifas and their successors, his spiritual message is traditionally remembered as having travelled to distant regions, including the Andhra Pradesh and wider Madras region, where Hazrat Khadar Vali Baba (R.A.) continued the legacy through a life dedicated to spirituality, service and the welfare of humanity.

== Names and titles ==
Shahenshah-e-Haft Aqleem, Qutb-e-Alam, Qandil-e-Noorani, Haikal-e-Samdani, Sahib-e-Asrar-ul-Ma'ani, Taj-ul-Auliya, Taj-ul-Millat-wad-Deen, Madar-ul-Alameen, Huzur Sarkar, Syed Muhammad Baba Tajuddin Taj-ul-Auliya (R.A.)'''.

The titles are used primarily as honorific and devotional expressions by his followers. They should be distinguished from his personal or birth name and from historically documented names used during his lifetime.The title Shahenshah-e-Haft Aqleem is particularly associated with Baba Tajuddin in Sufi devotional tradition and is described as a title used by his followers.
