= Kharfaq =

Kharfaq کھرفق
- Village
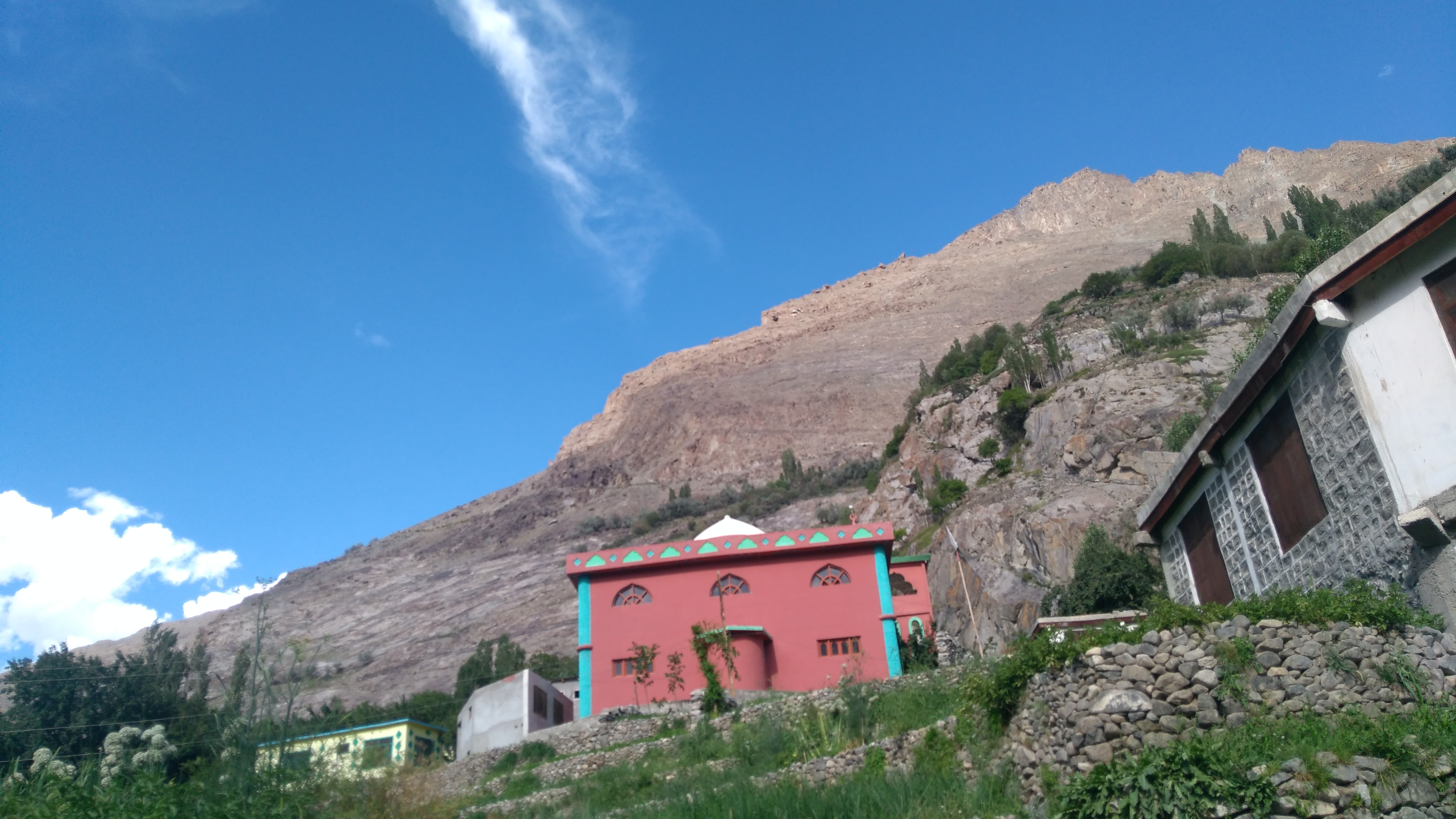
- A building in the village

- Location in Gilgit-Baltistan Location in Pakistan
- Coordinates: 35.190906°N 76.181643°E
- Country: Pakistan
- Administrative unit: Gilgit-Baltistan
- District: Ghanche District
- Time zone: UTC+5 (PST)
  - Summer (DST): UTC+6 (GMT+6)

Kharfaq (Urdu: کھرفق) is a small village with a population of about 2,000 people in Ghanche District, Gilgit-Baltistan, Pakistan. The village is 2 km (1.2 mi) away and a 3-hour hike from Kharfaq Lakea, famous for its large trout population.

== Geography ==
Khaplu, which is Ghanche District's administrative capital, is 24 km away. The average altitude of the area is around 4600m above sea level. The main attraction of the area are its beautiful valleys, wild animals, lakes and rare birds. The village is located 3 hours away from Kharfaq Lake, a lake famous for its large trout population. The village is located on the Shyok River.

== Language ==
Balti, a Tibetic language, is spoken in Kharfaq and adjoining parts of Ladakh. It is mutually intelligible with the Ladakhi language and the Purgi language. Many of the written consonants that are silent in Standard Tibetan are pronounced in the Balti language.

== Gallery ==
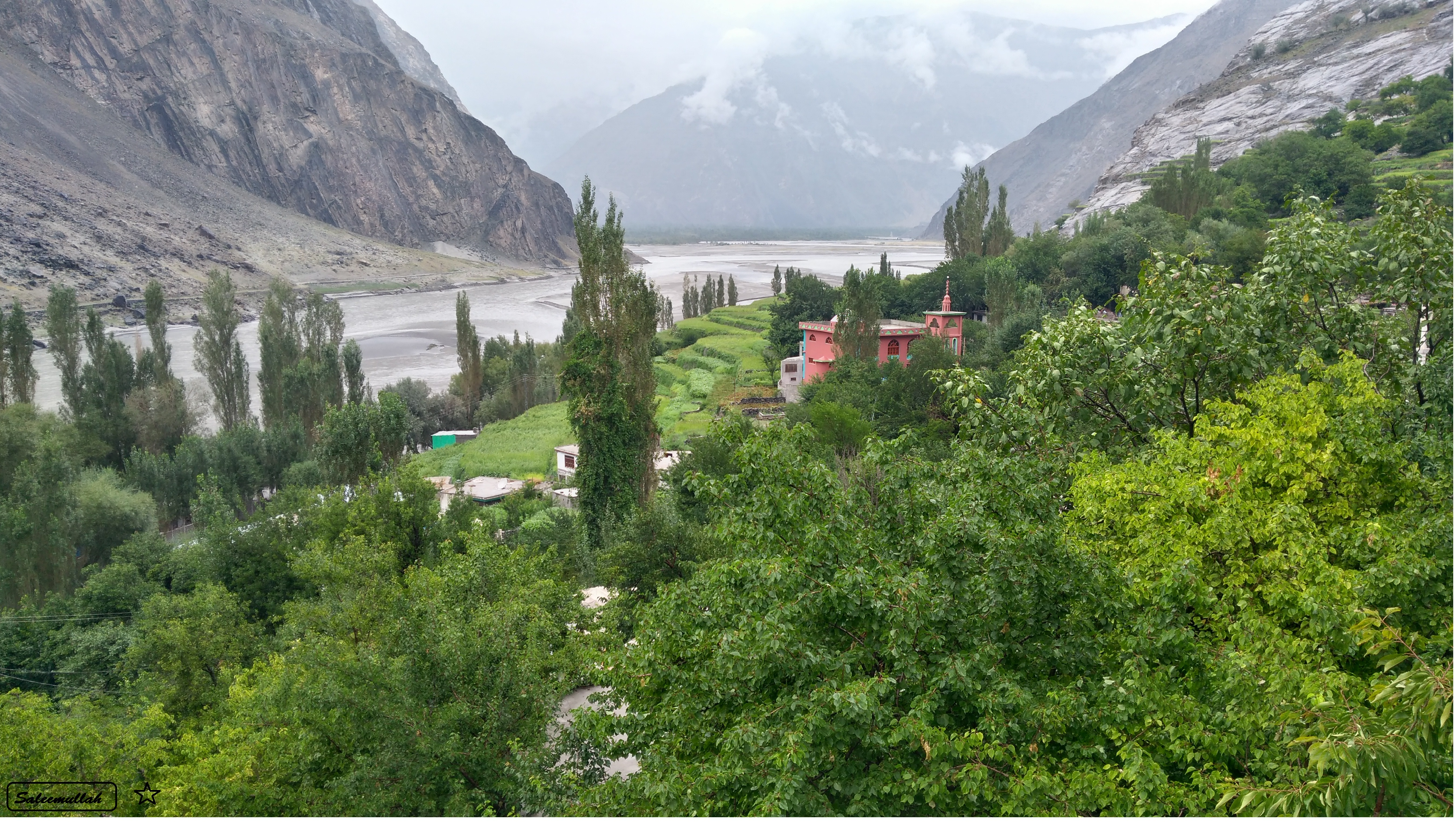
A view of the village from the hillside

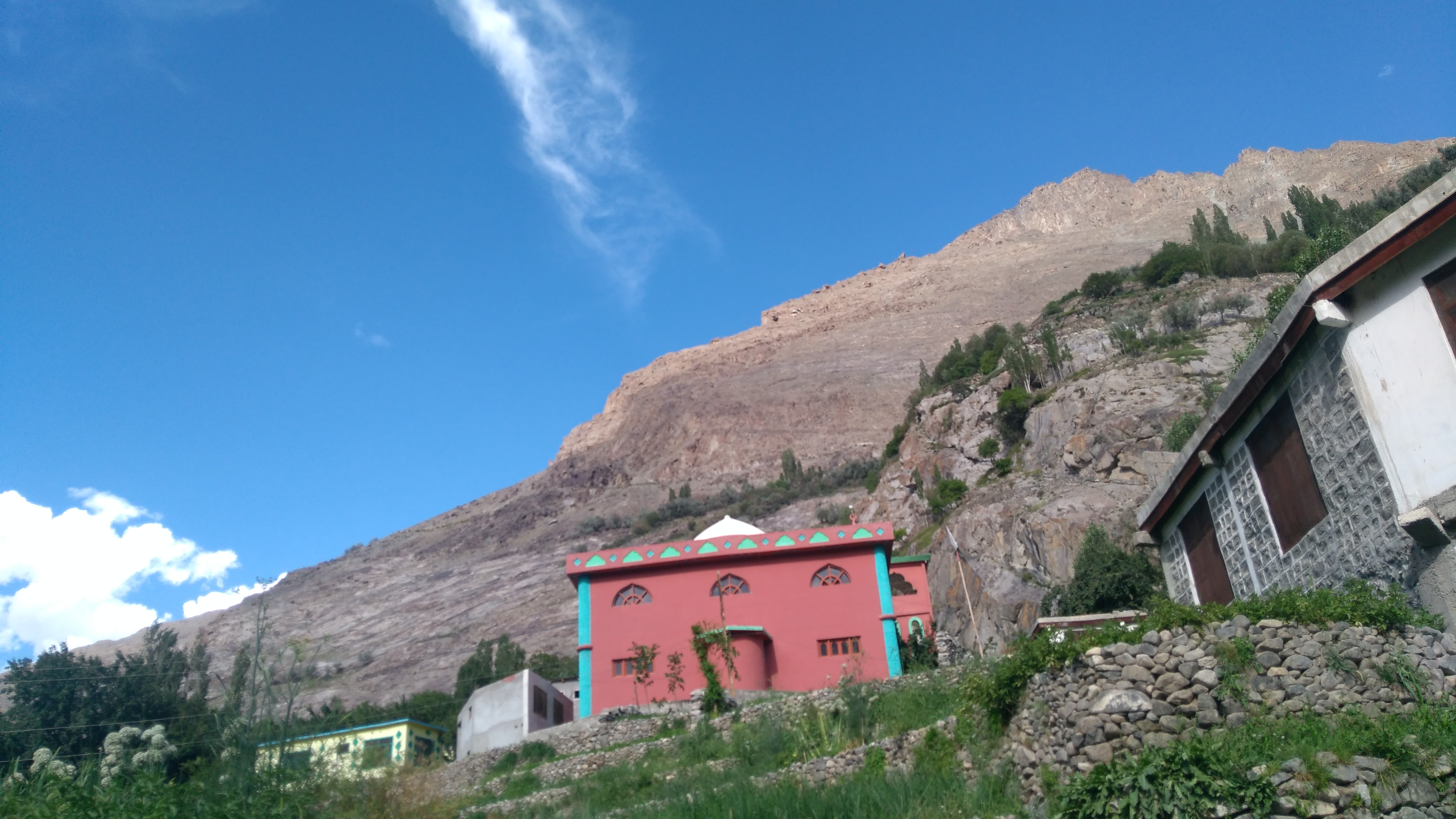
