= Kharfaq Lake =

Lake in Baltistan, Pakistan

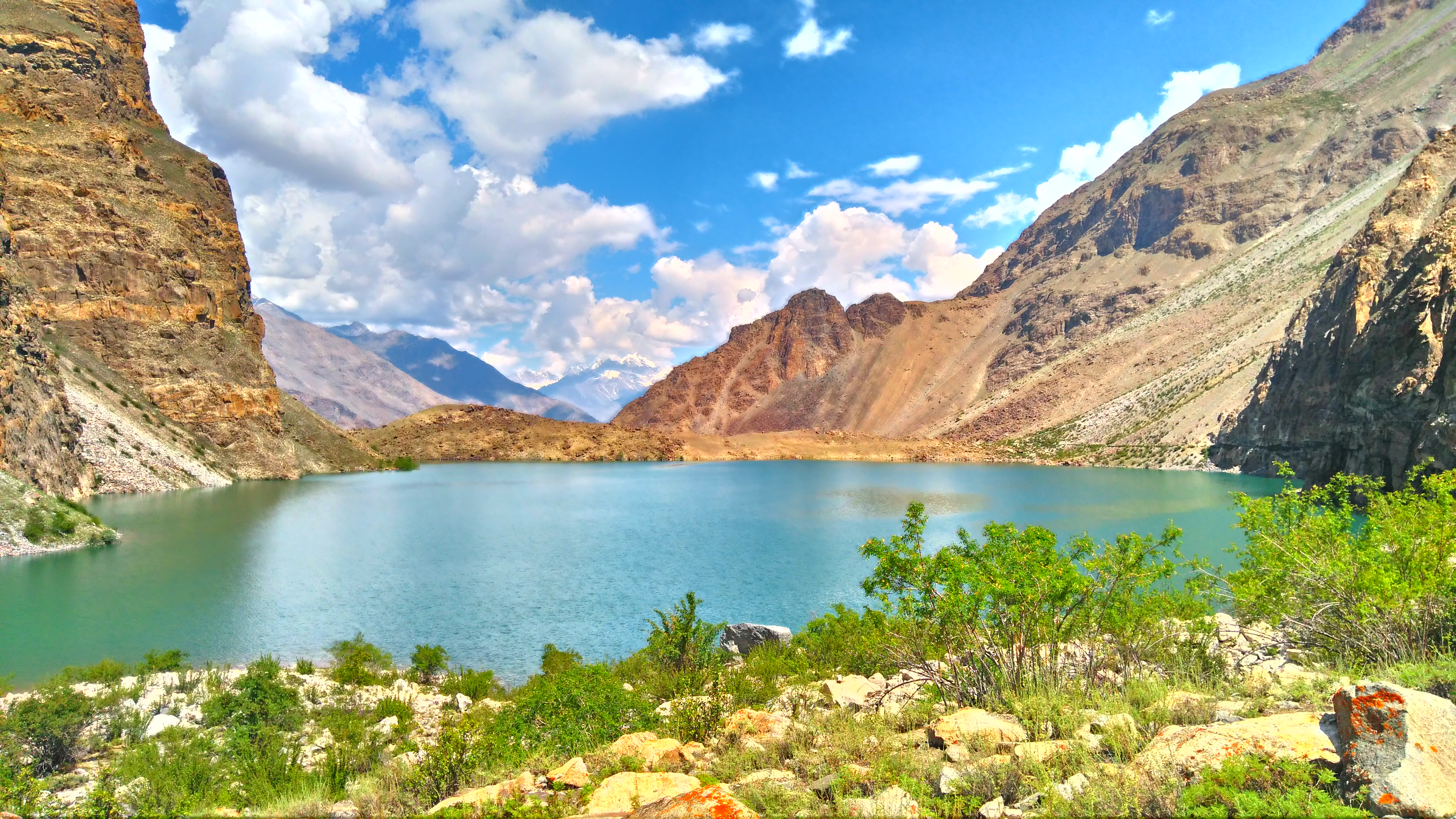
- Kharfaq Lake

- Location within Gilgit-Baltistan Location within Pakistan
- Location: Kharfaq, Gilgit–Baltistan, Pakistan
- Coordinates: 35°10′17″N 76°12′19″E
- Basin countries: Pakistan
- Max. length: 837 metres (2,746 ft)
- Max. width: 468 metres (1,535 ft)
- Surface elevation: 3,350 metres (10,990 ft)
- Islands: no

Kharfaq Lake is a high-altitude natural lake located in the Karakoram mountain range in Kharfaq, Gilgit-Baltistan, Pakistan. July and August are the best months to visit the lake. The lake's water level starts rising in May with increased snowmelt and reaches it maximum level in the middle of July. In winter, the snow covers the whole lake in its whiteness.

== Wildlife ==
The lake is famous for its indigenous fish species. The lake and its environs serve as an important wildlife habitat. The lake have thousand of trout and indigenous fish.

== Location ==
The lake is 2 km (1.2 mi) or around a 3-hour hike from the Kharfaq village. A road has been under construction for a while but has not been completed due to a lack of fund allocation.

== Gallery ==
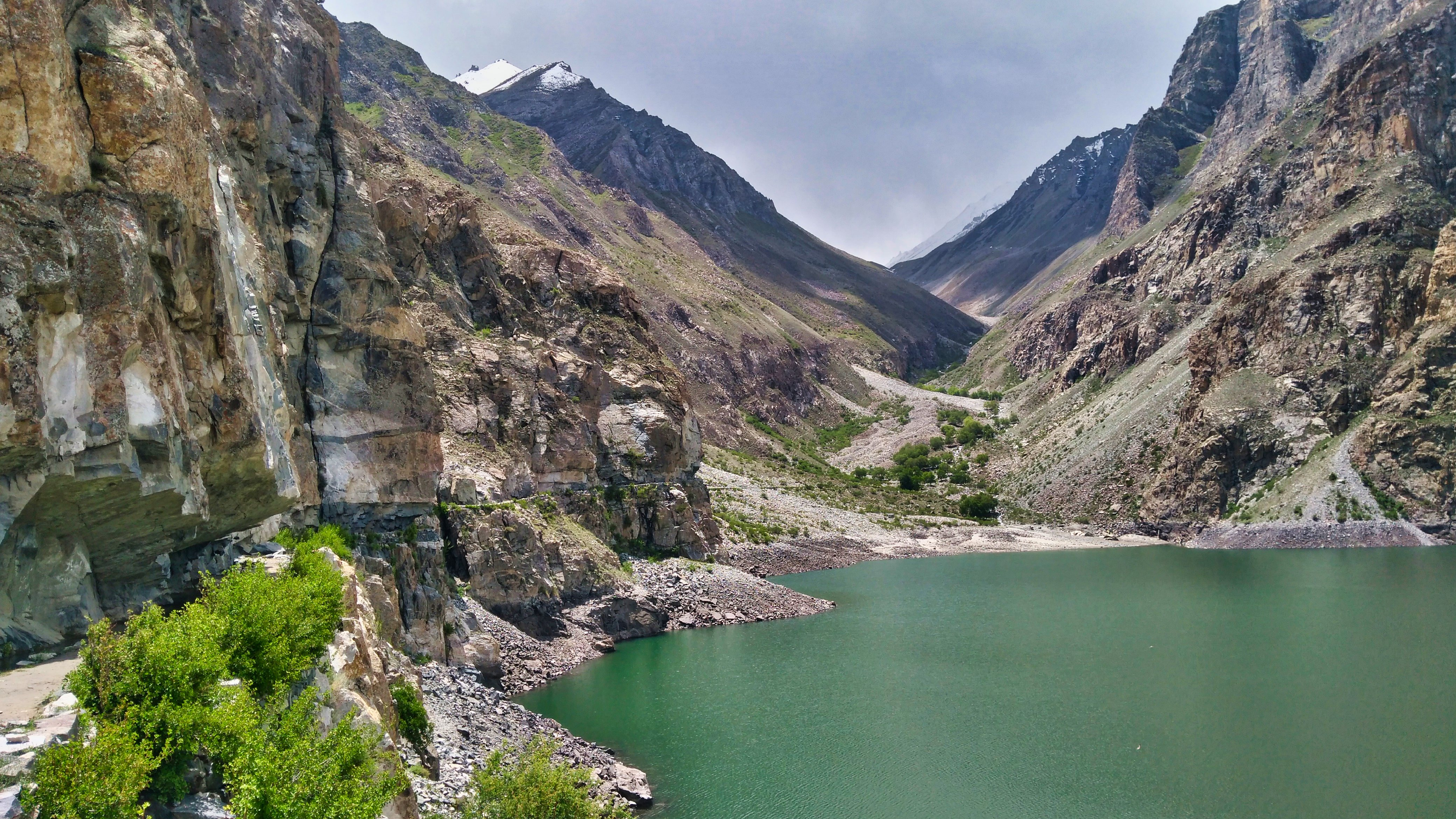

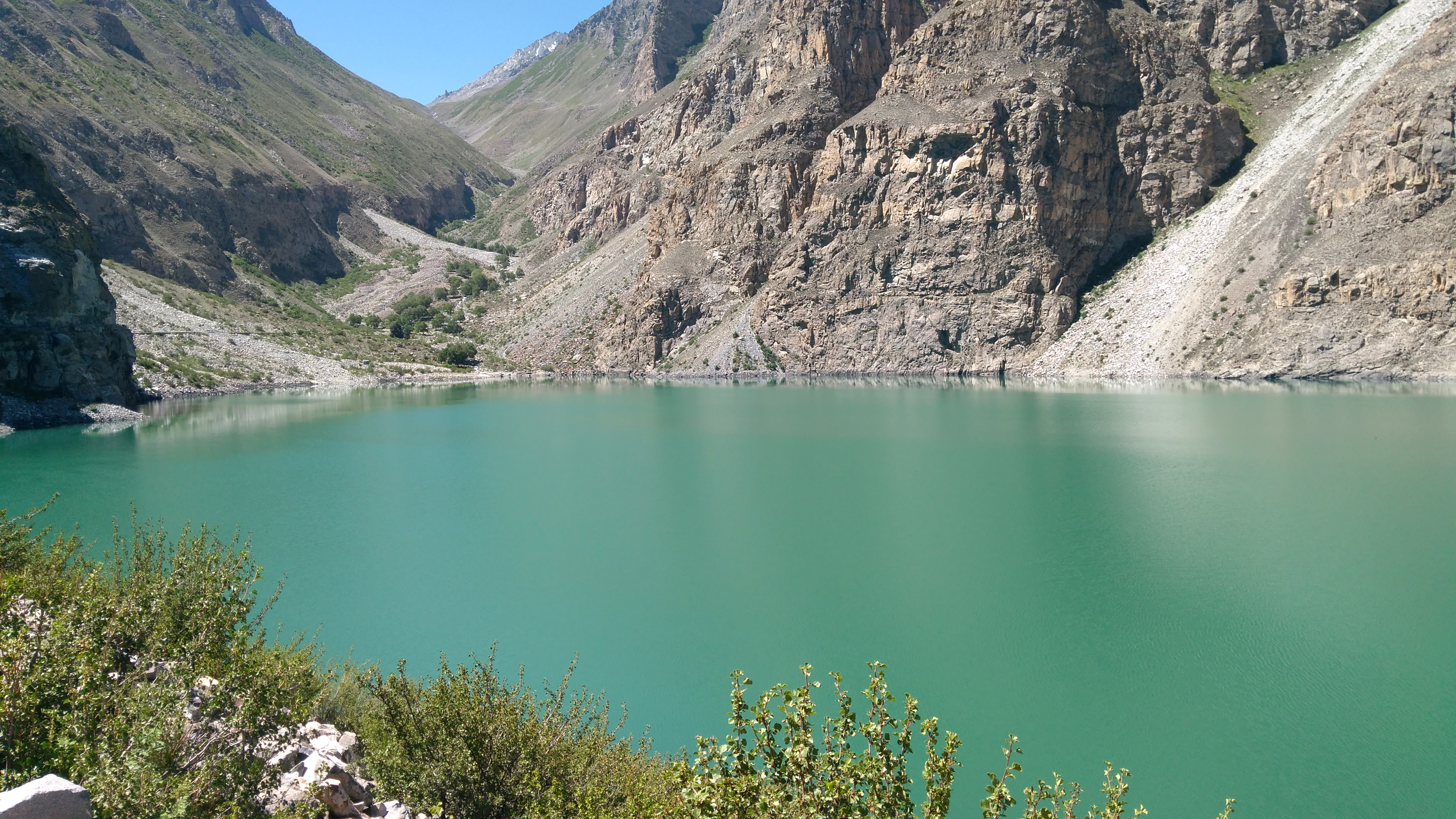

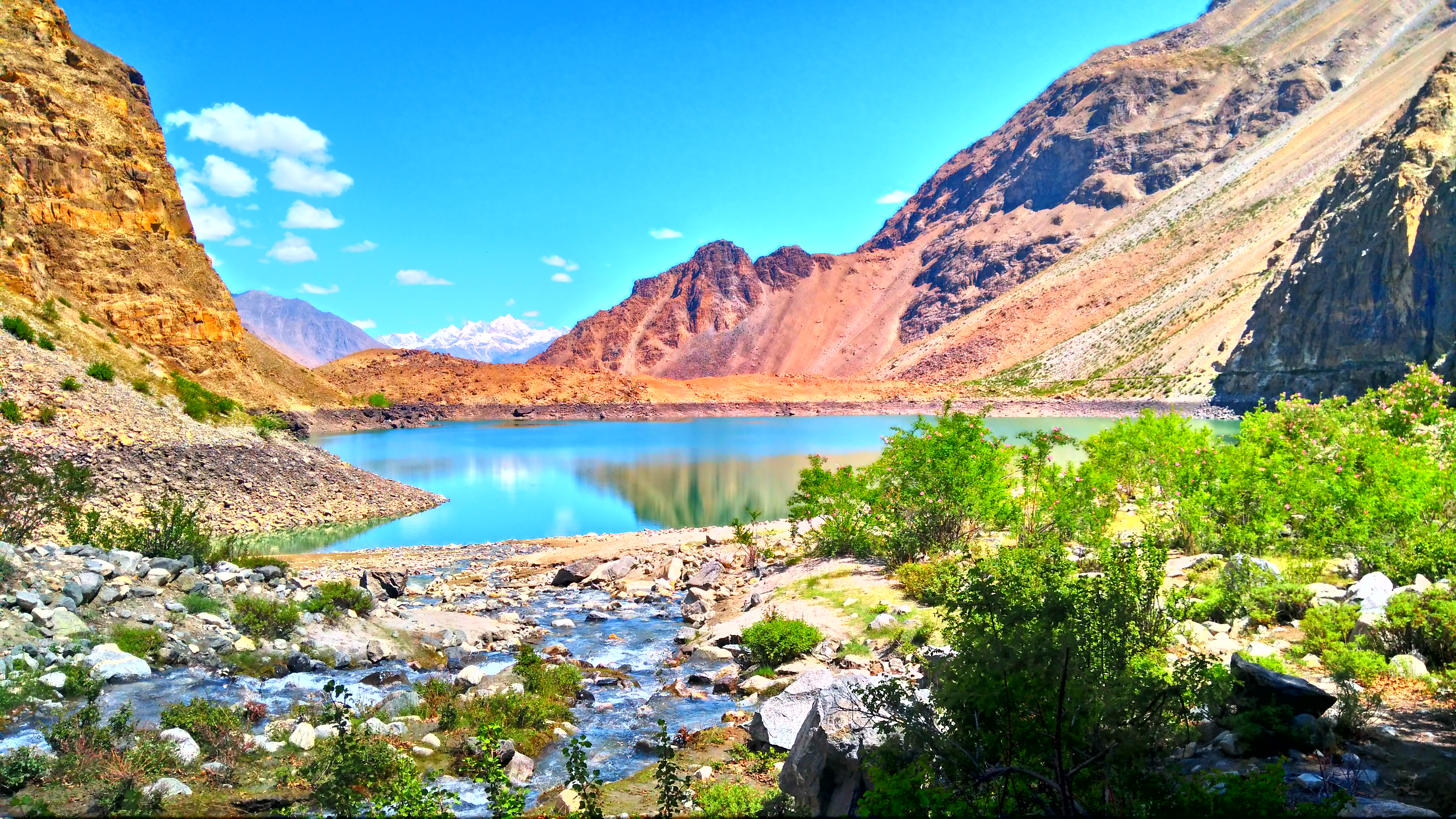

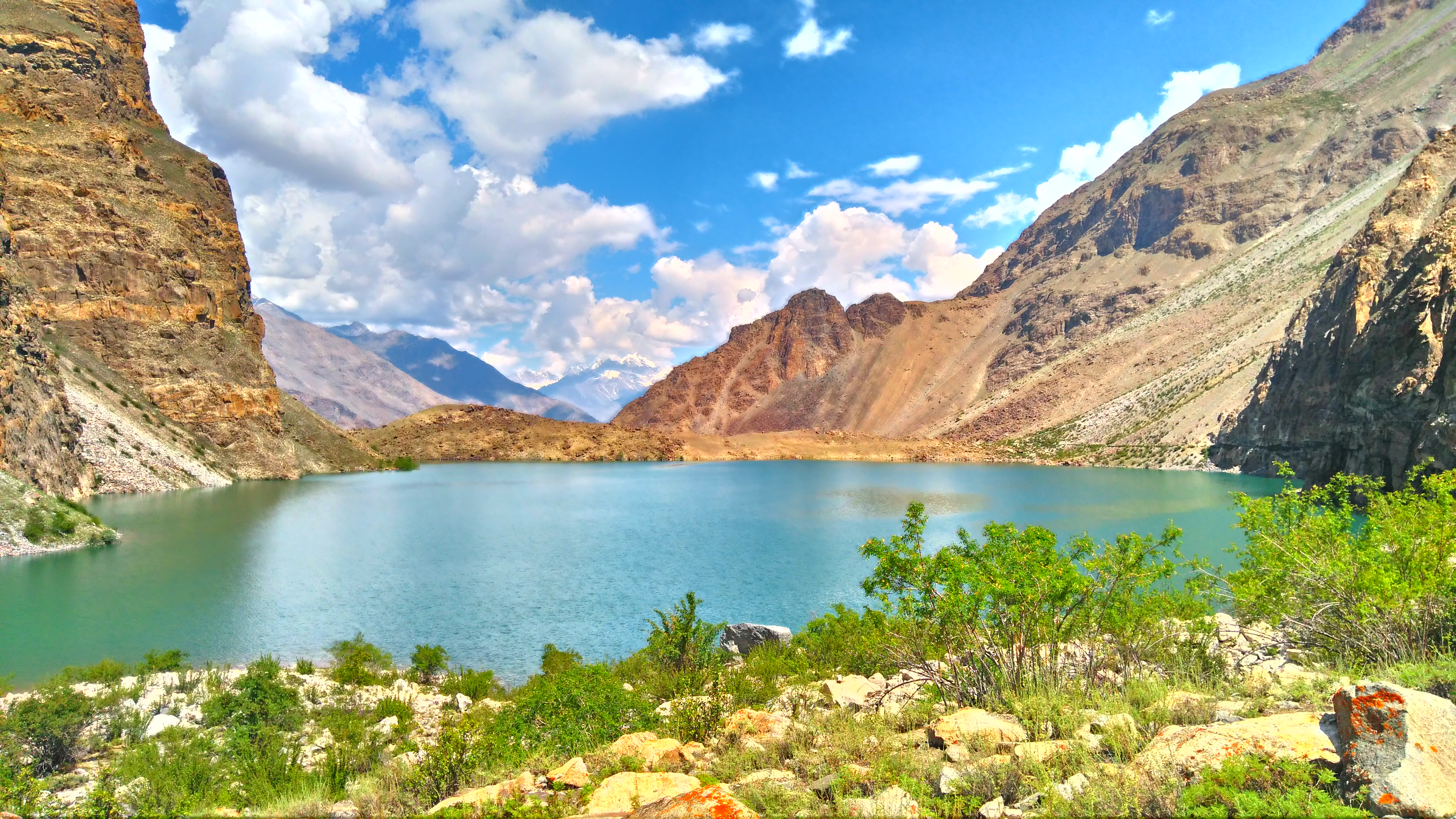

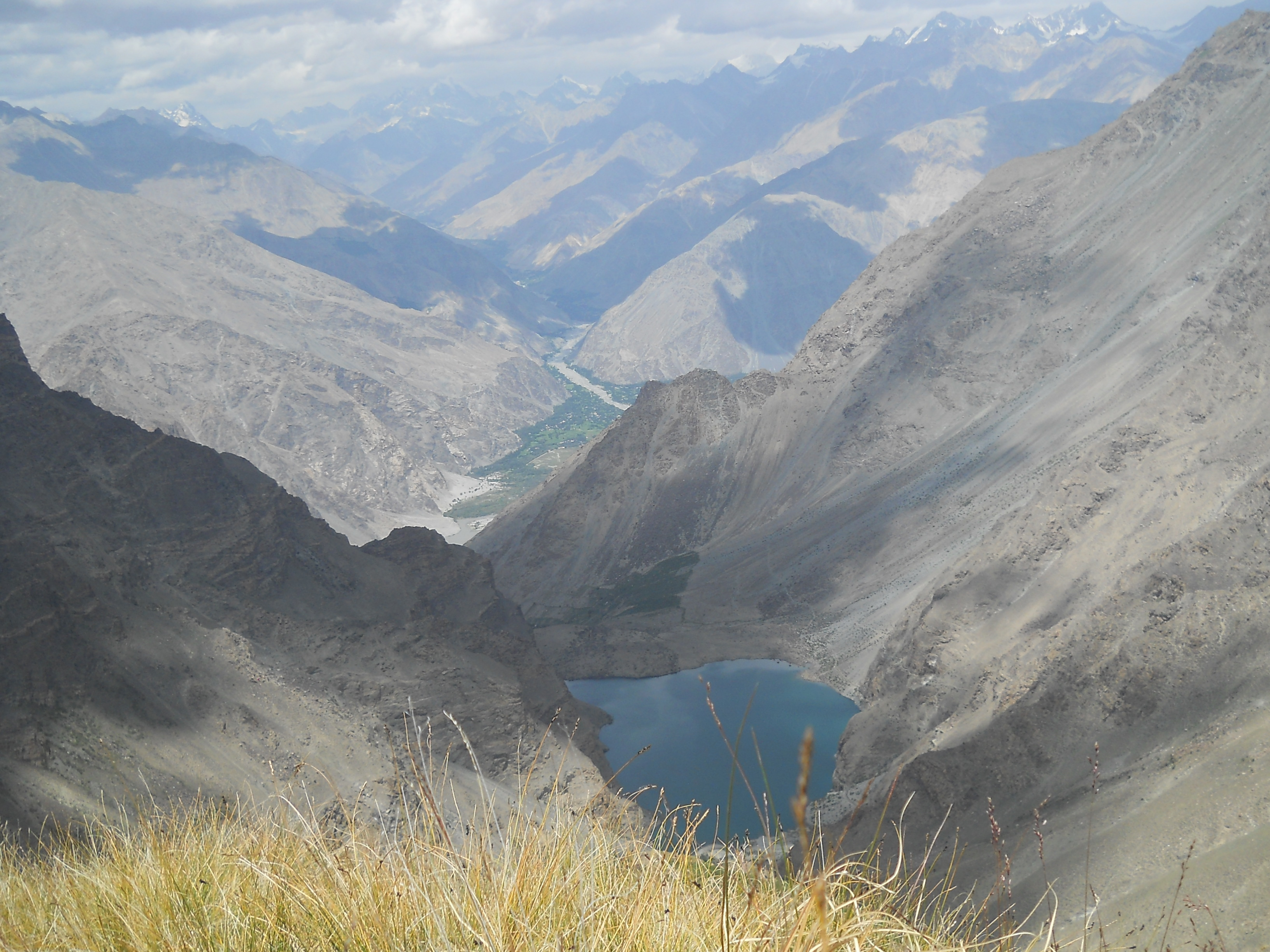

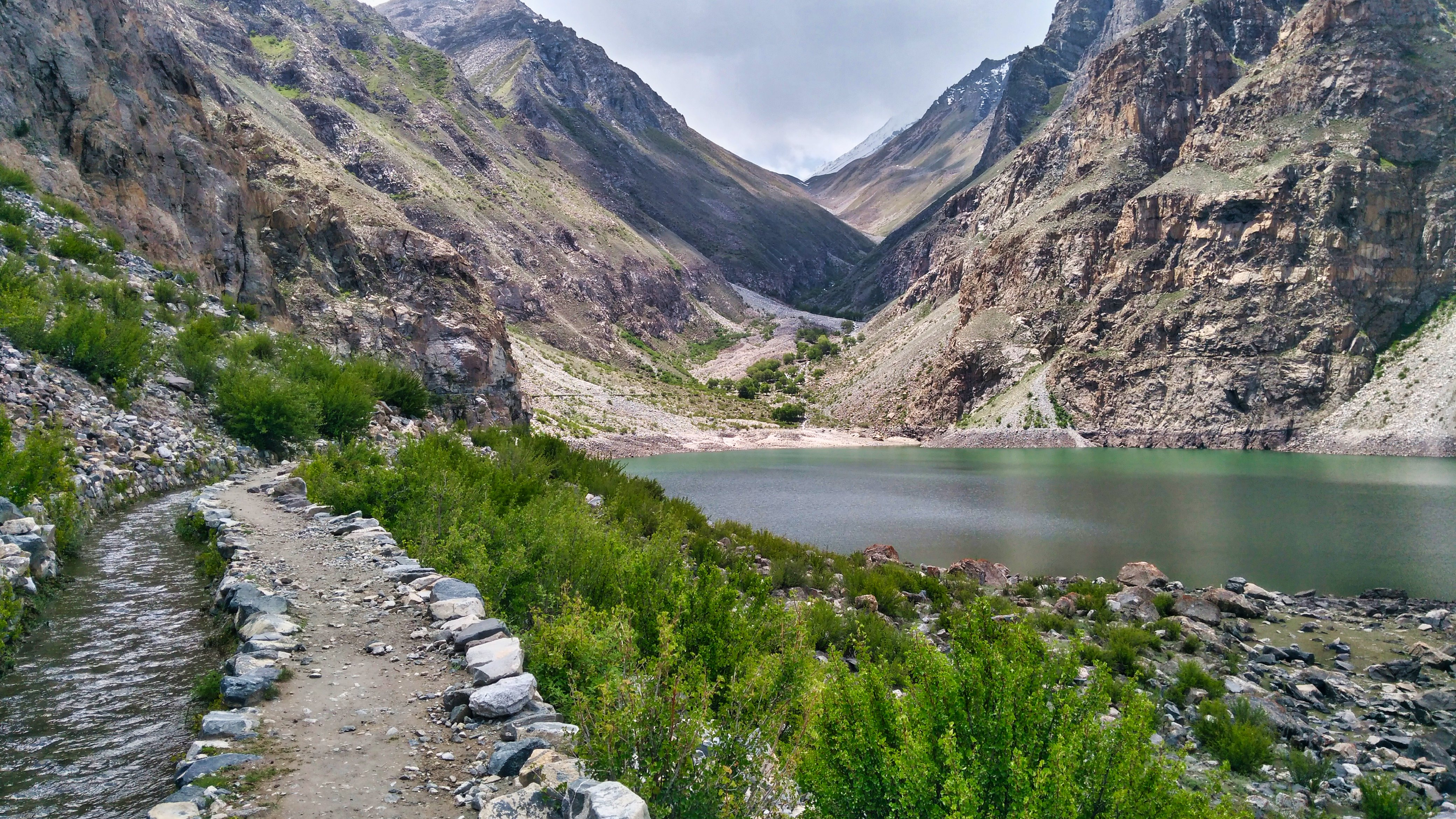

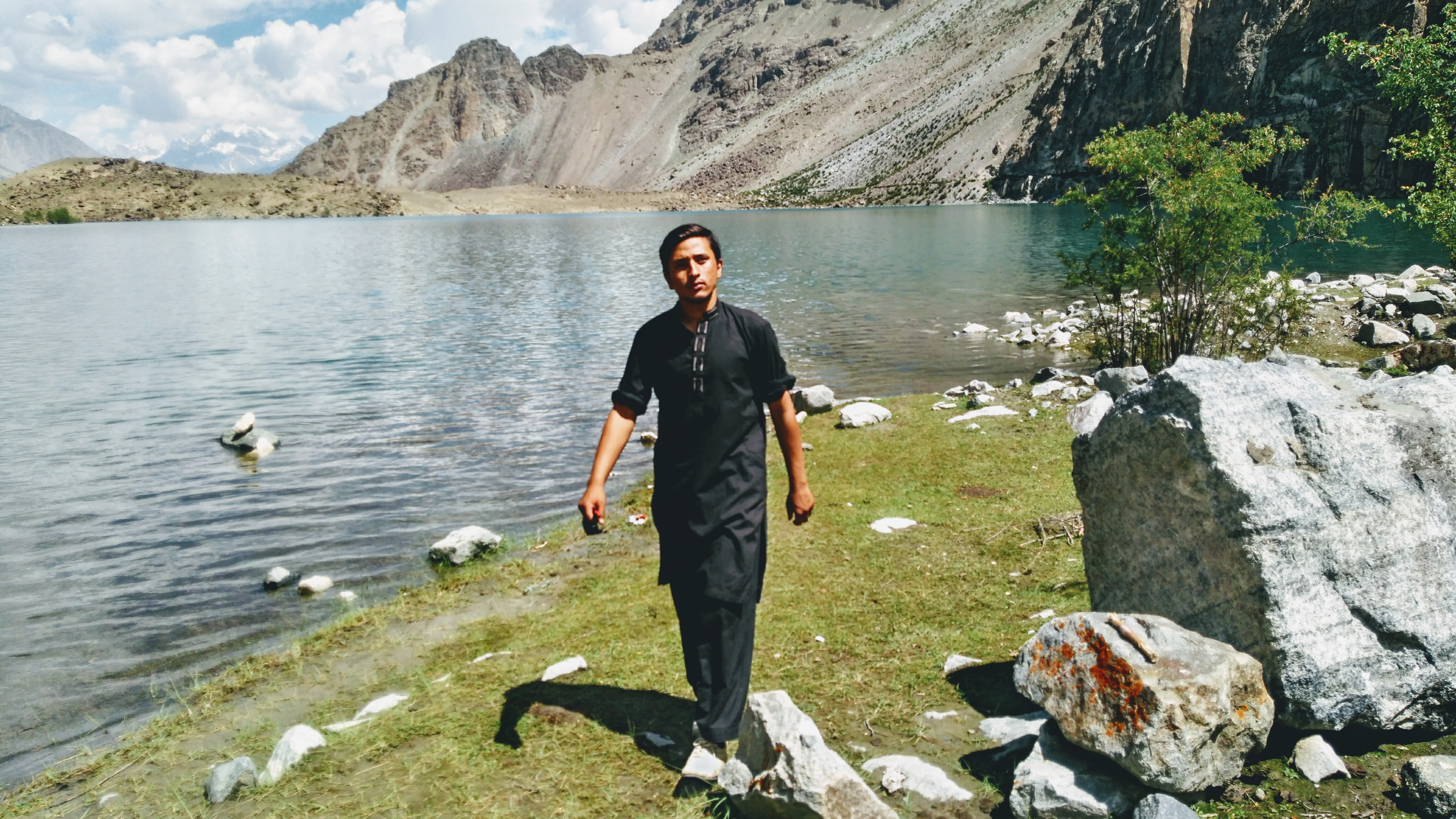
