= Chaqchan Mosque =

Mosque in Khaplu, Gilgit-Baltistan, Pakistan

- مسجد چقچن
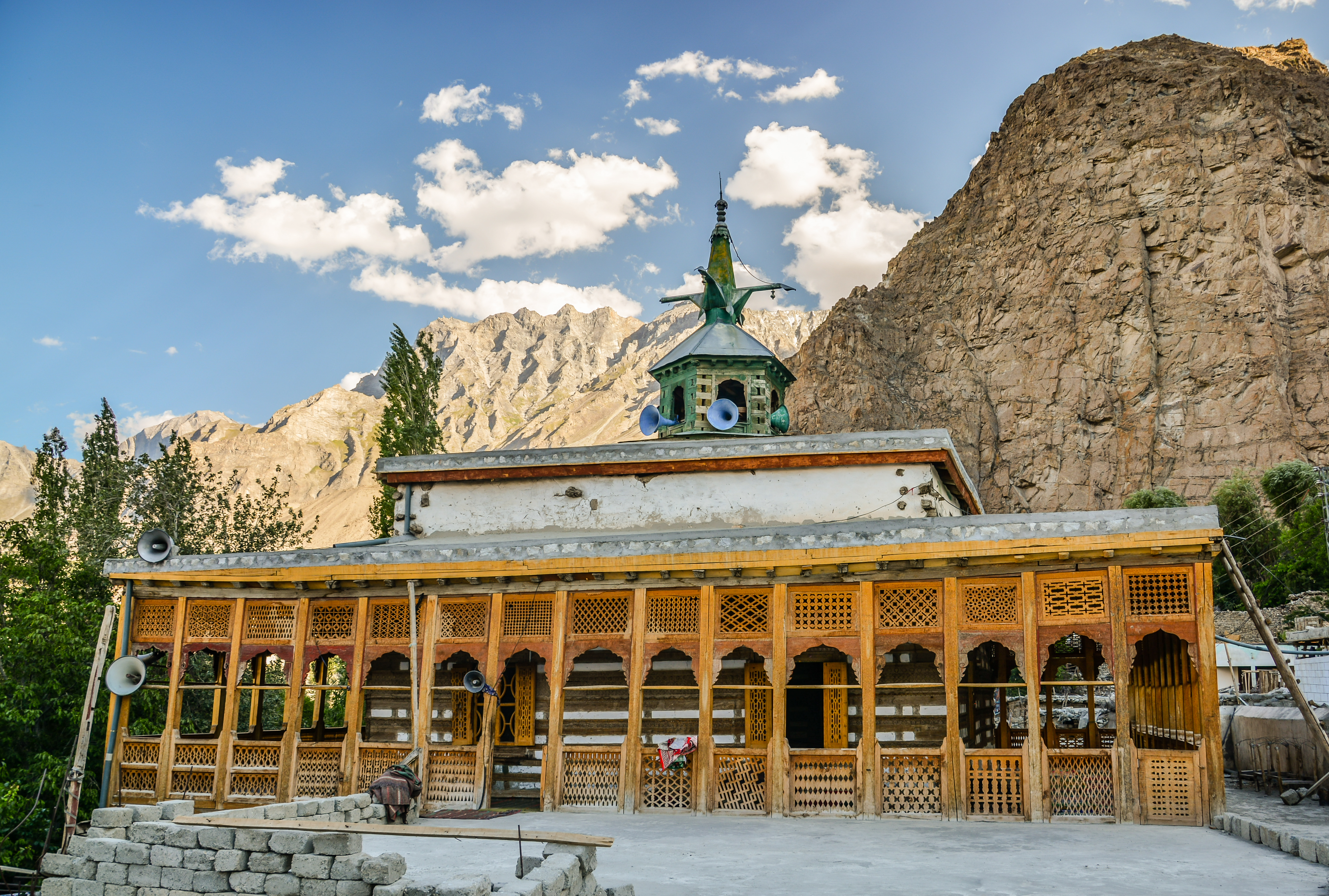

Religion
- Affiliation: Sunni Islam
- Sect: Sufism Noorbakshia
- Ecclesiastical or organisational status: Mosque
- Status: Active

Location
- Location: Khaplu, Gilgit-Baltistan
- Country: Pakistan
- Interactive map of Chaqchan Mosque
- Coordinates: 35°09′22″N 76°19′50″E

Architecture
- Type: Mosque architecture
- Style: Tibetan; Kashmiri; Persian
- Completed: 1370 CE

Specifications
- Capacity: 500 (including verandah)
- Spire: One

The Chaqchan Mosque (Urdu: مسجد چقچن, lit. 'The Miraculous Mosque') is a Sufi Noorbakshia mosque, located in the city of Khaplu, in the Gilgit-Baltistan region of northern Pakistan. Dating from 1370, the mosque is one of the oldest in the region, from the time when the area's populace converted en masse from Tibetan Buddhism to Islam. The mosque has architecture similar to that of mosques built in the Kashmir Valley. It features a blend of Tibetan, Mughal and Persian styles of architecture.

== History ==
According to some sources, the mosque was built by Mir Sayyid Ali Hamadani while others say on the arrival of Sufi saint Syed Nurbakhsh from Kashmir to Baltistan, the local ruling Raja converted to Islam and commissioned the building of the mosque in 1370 CE. However, the dating of the latter theory contradicts historical sources which suggest that the mosque was probably constructed more than two decades before the birth of Syed Nurbakhsh.

== Conservation ==
The Government of Pakistan has listed the Chaqchan Mosque as a Pakistan Heritage Site. The mosque is currently in use after extensive conservation works.

== Architecture ==
Architecturally, the mosque displays a blend of Tibetan, Mughal, Kashmiri and Persian styles, and consists of a two-story cubic complex: Semi-basement, ground floor with a turret atop. The perimetral walls of the cubic structure are composed of wooden slabs stacked to form a frame with its void spaces daubed with clay or mud; this technology is similar to the Roman opus craticum technique. This method of construction is one of the oldest known for making weatherproof structures and it is also suitable for harsh winter conditions.

=== Gallery ===
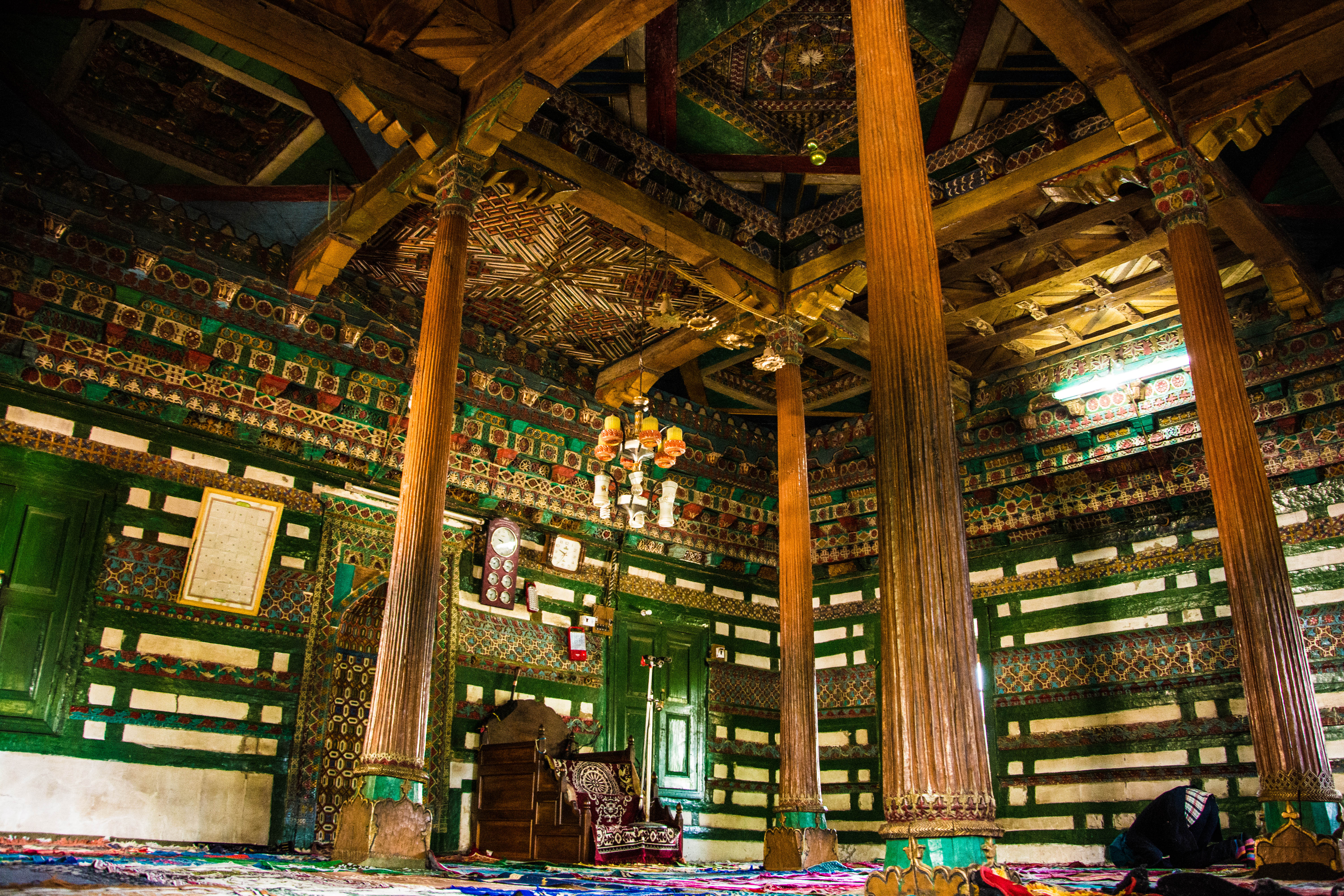
The mosque's interior with extensive woodwork

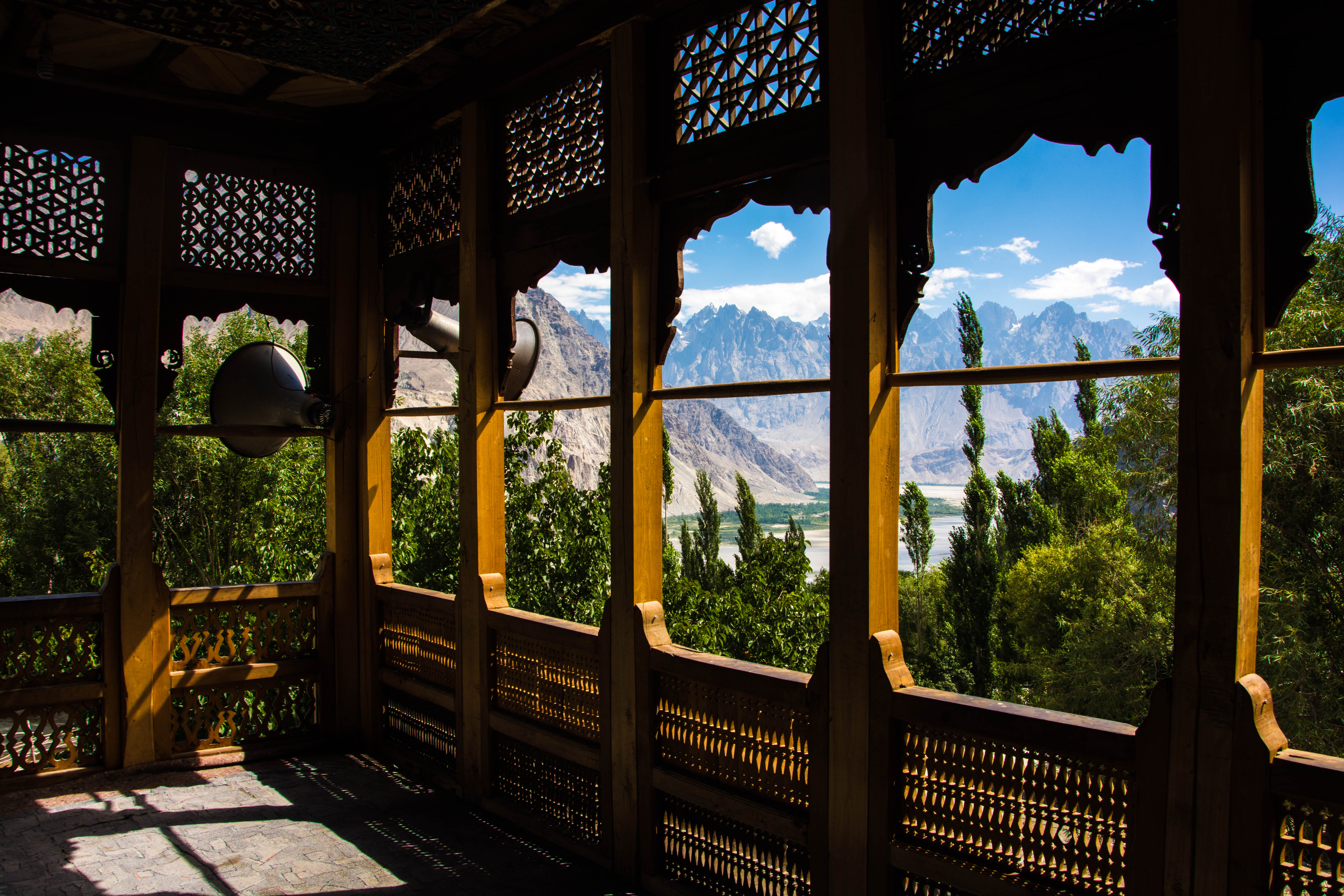
View over the valley from the mosque

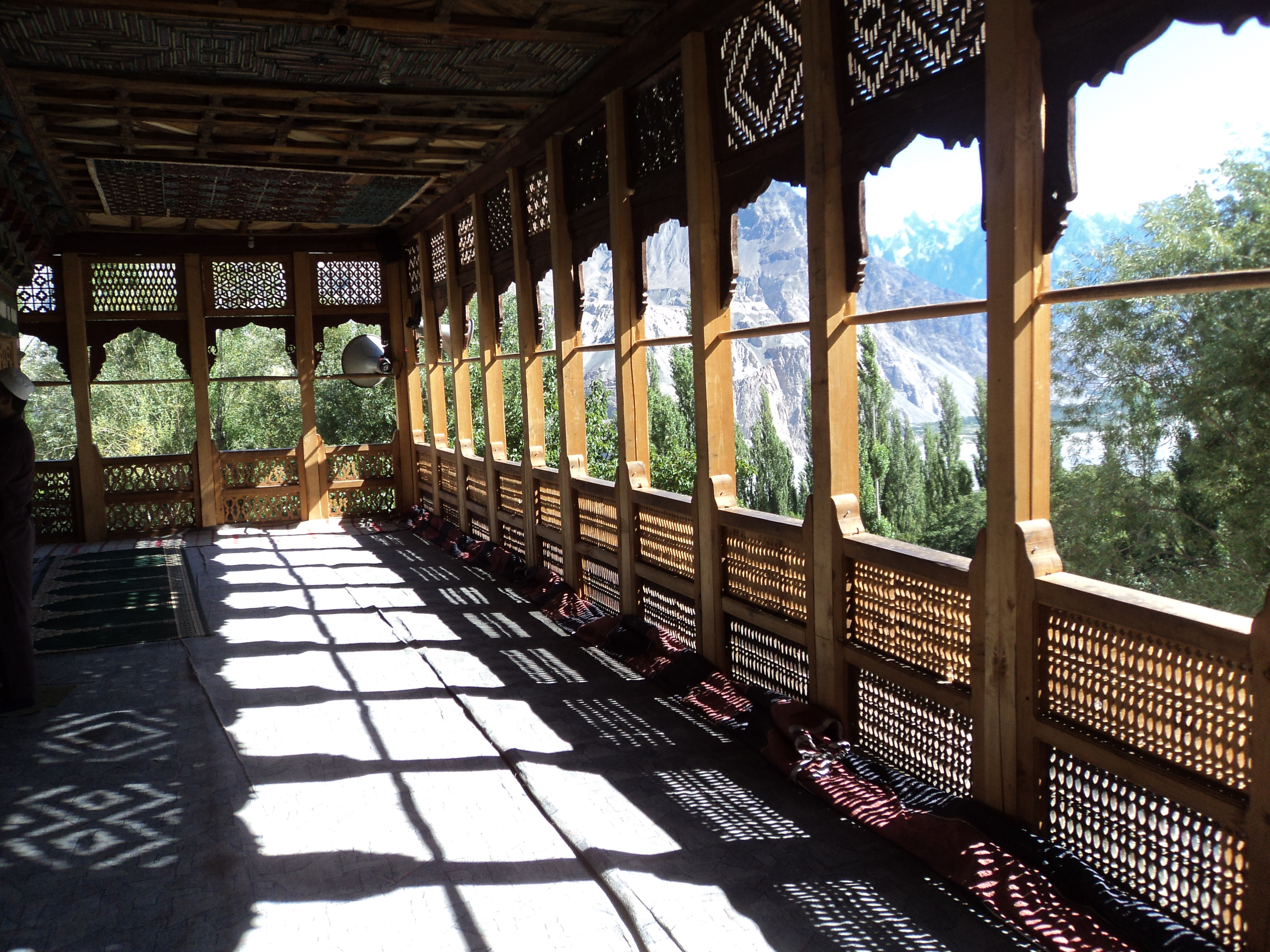
Chaqchan Mosque's Arches

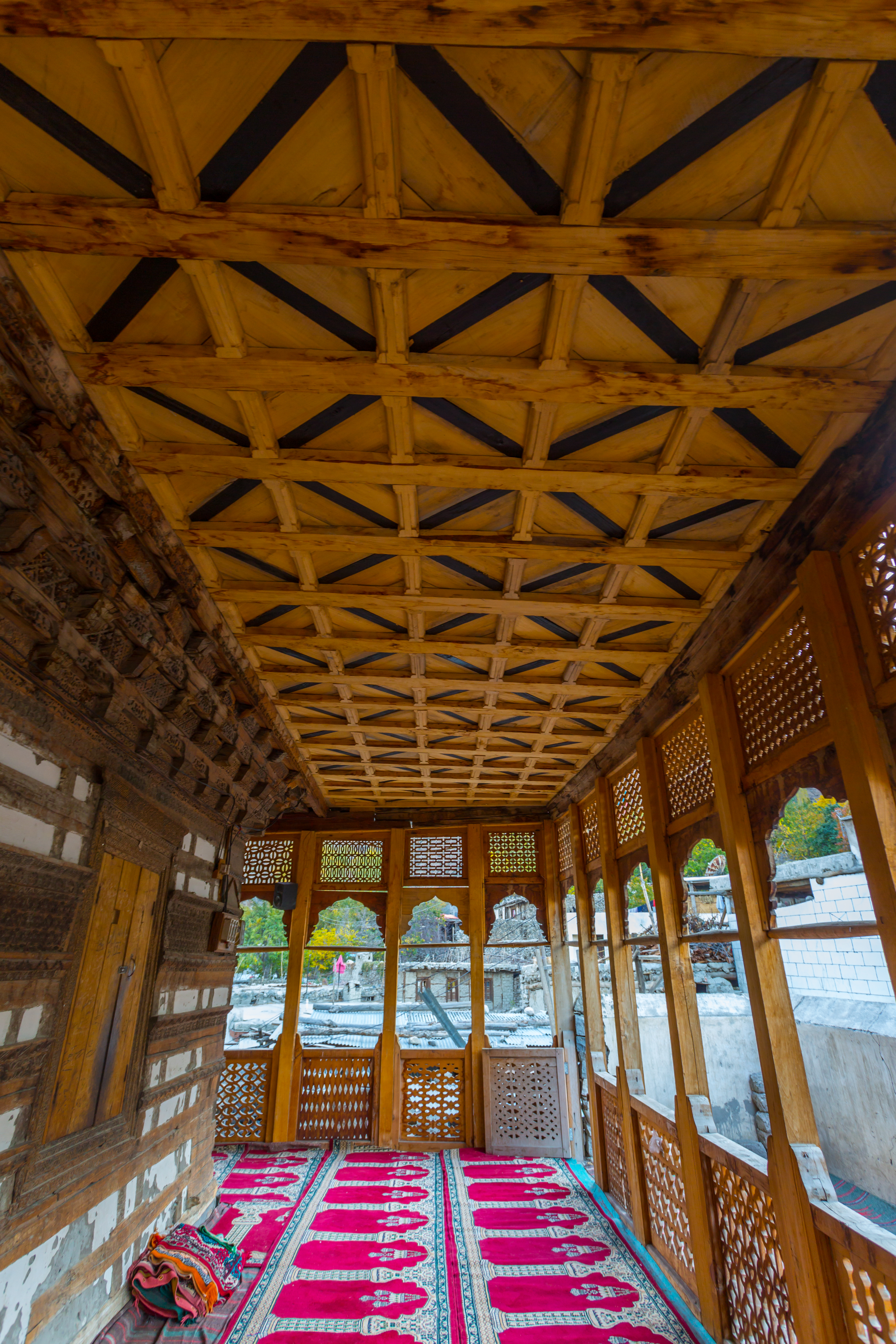

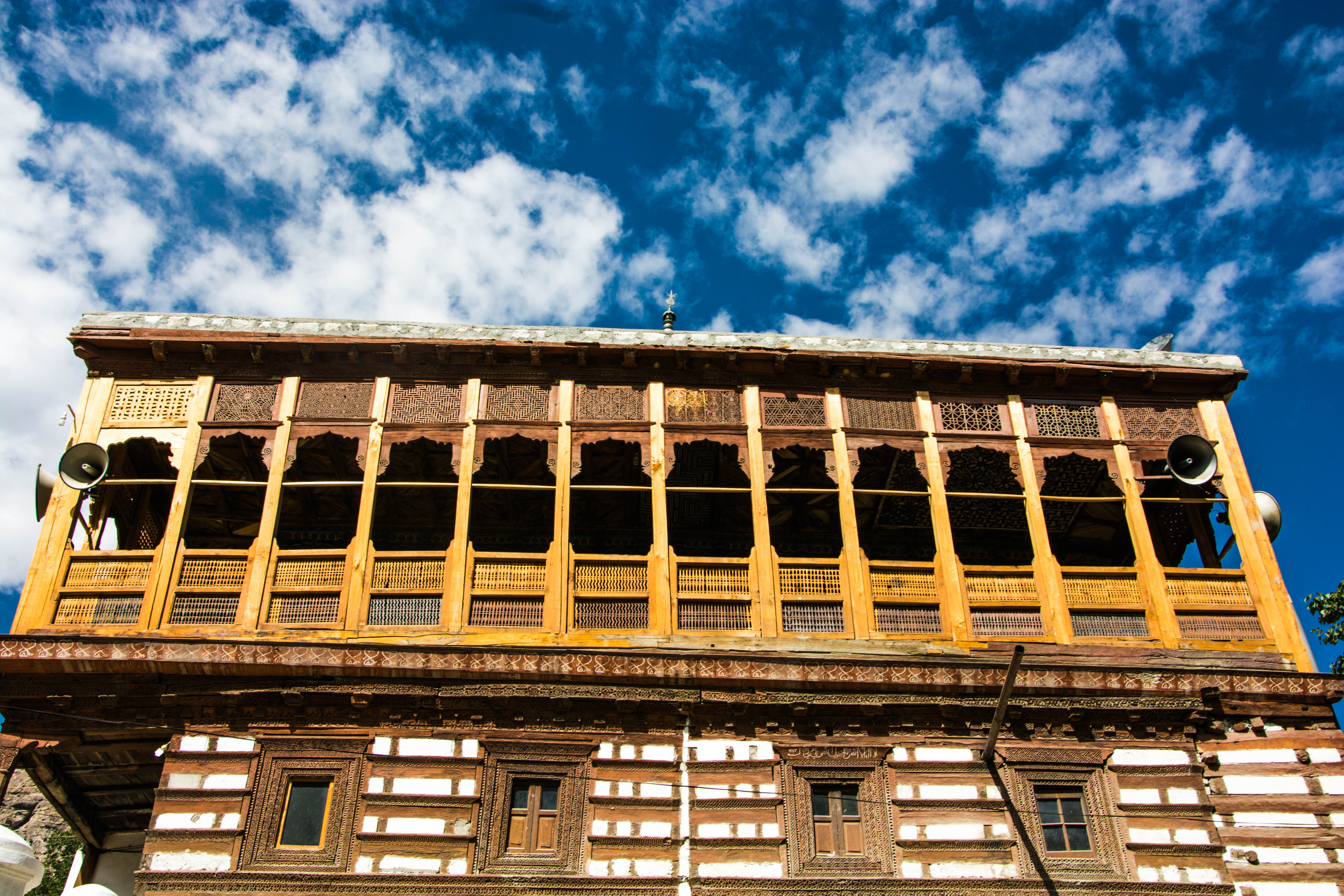
The mosque's exterior

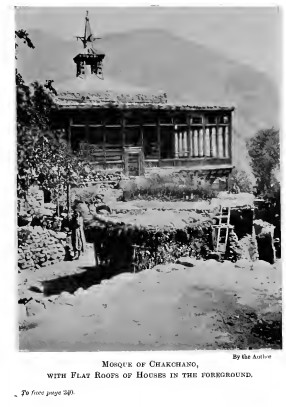
Chaqchan Mosque around 1st decade of 19 century

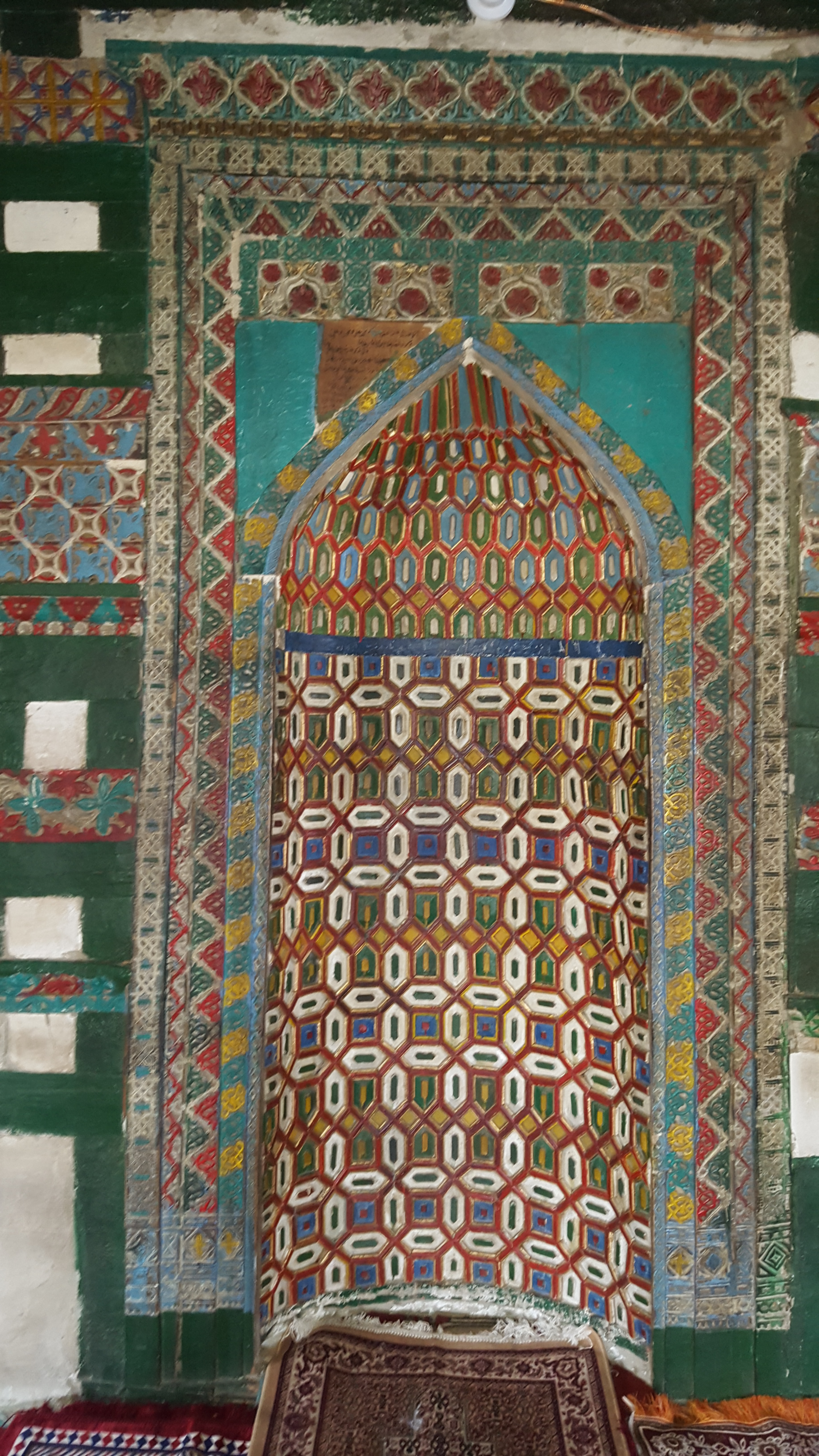
The mosque's decorated mihrab

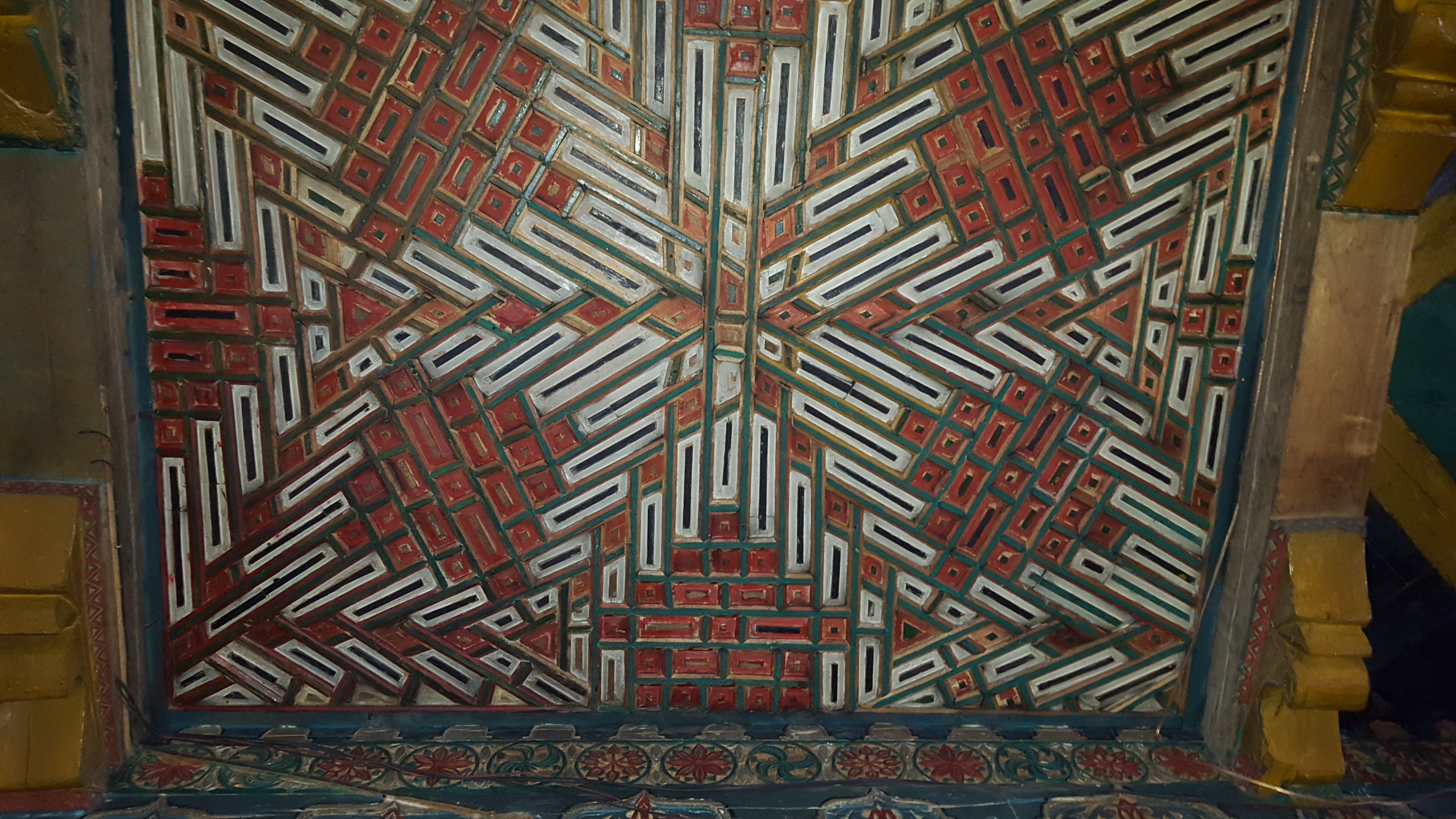
Portion of the decorated ceiling

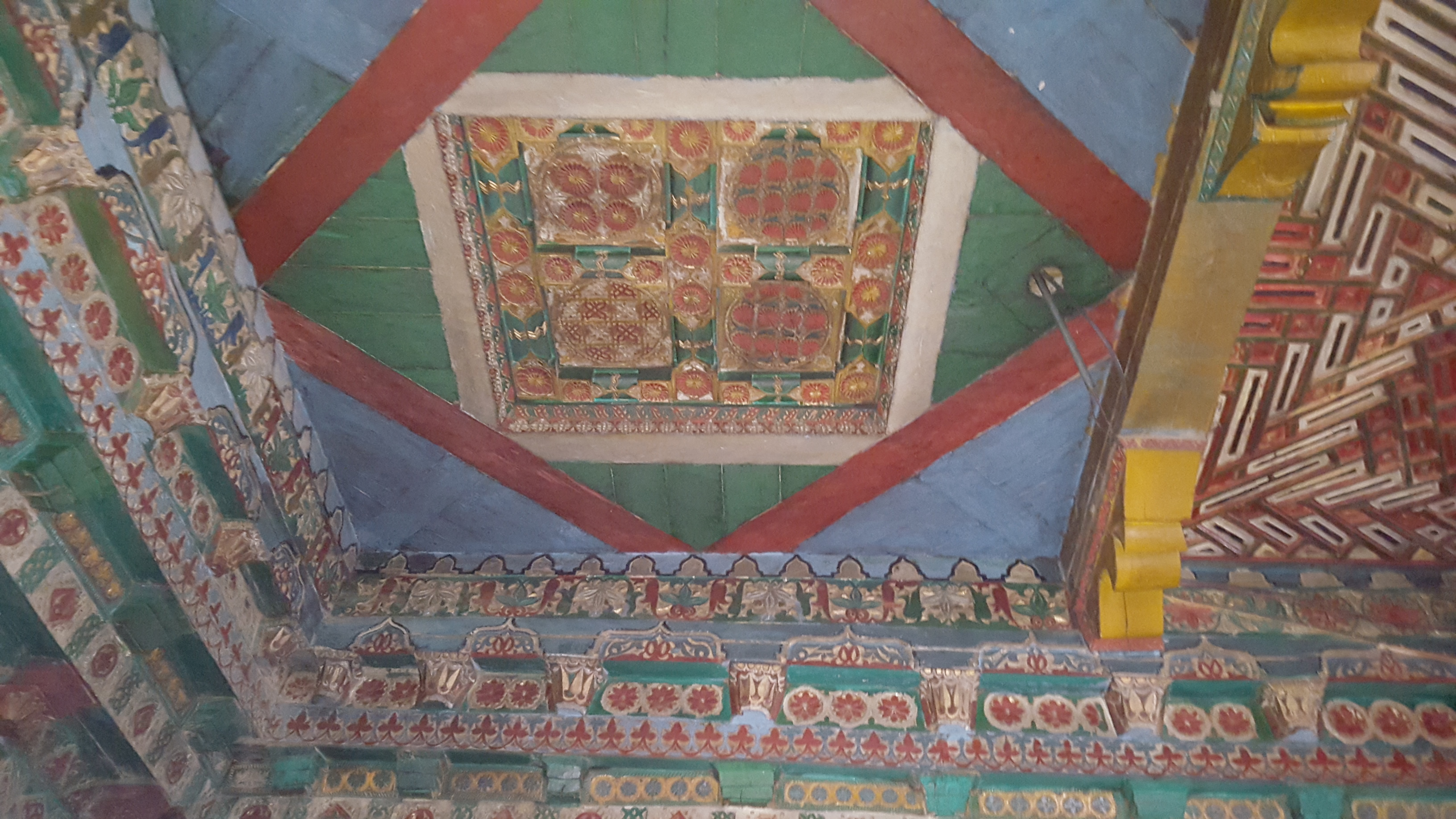
Almost all surfaces of the mosque's interior, including its ceiling, are decorated

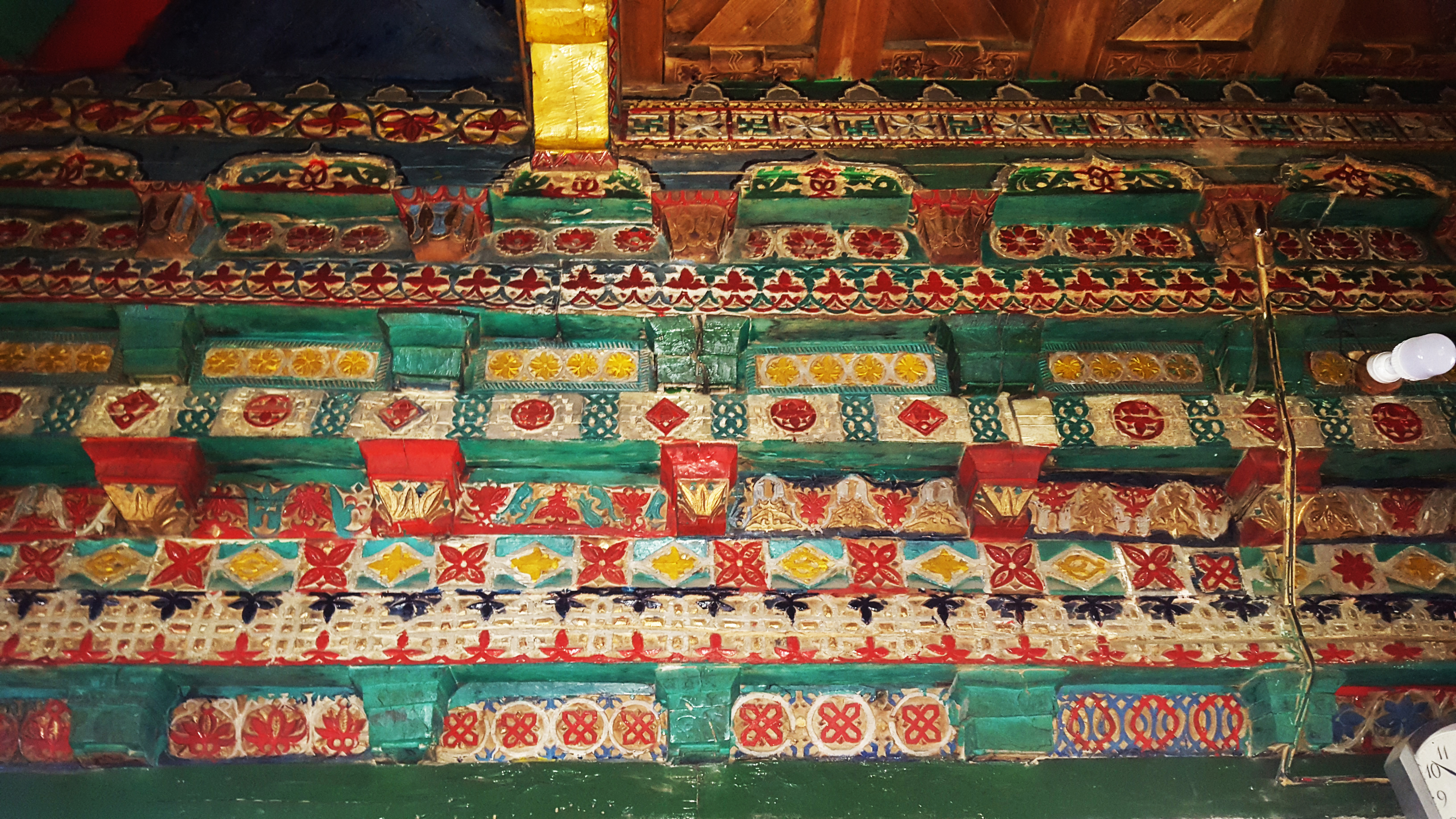
Interior decorations make use of vibrant colours

== See also ==
- Amburiq Mosque
- Islam in Pakistan
- List of mosques in Pakistan
