= Haldi Cones =

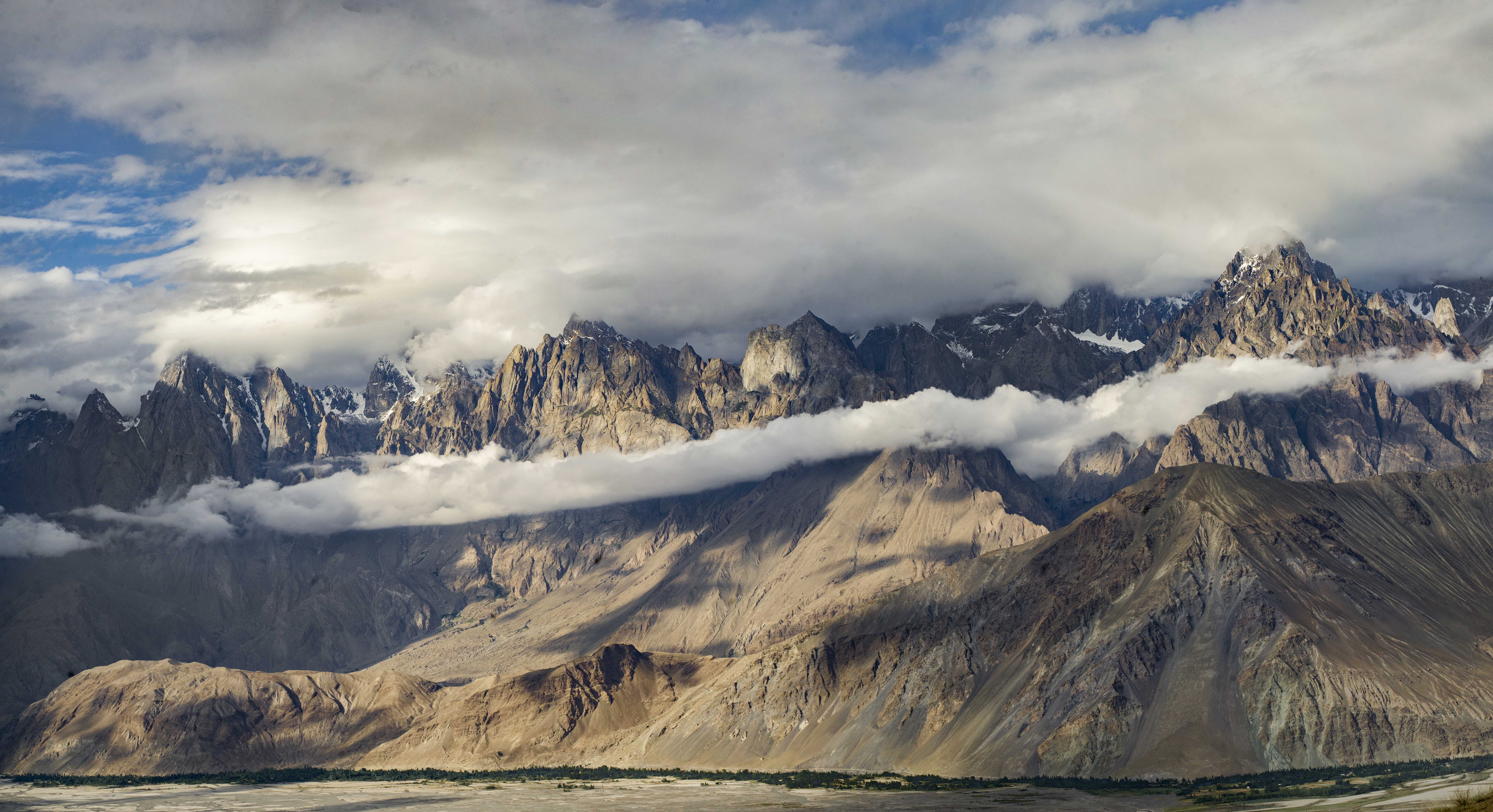
- Haldi Cones

Highest point
- Elevation: 7,742 m (25,400 ft)
- Coordinates: 35°16′15″N 76°25′48″E

Geography
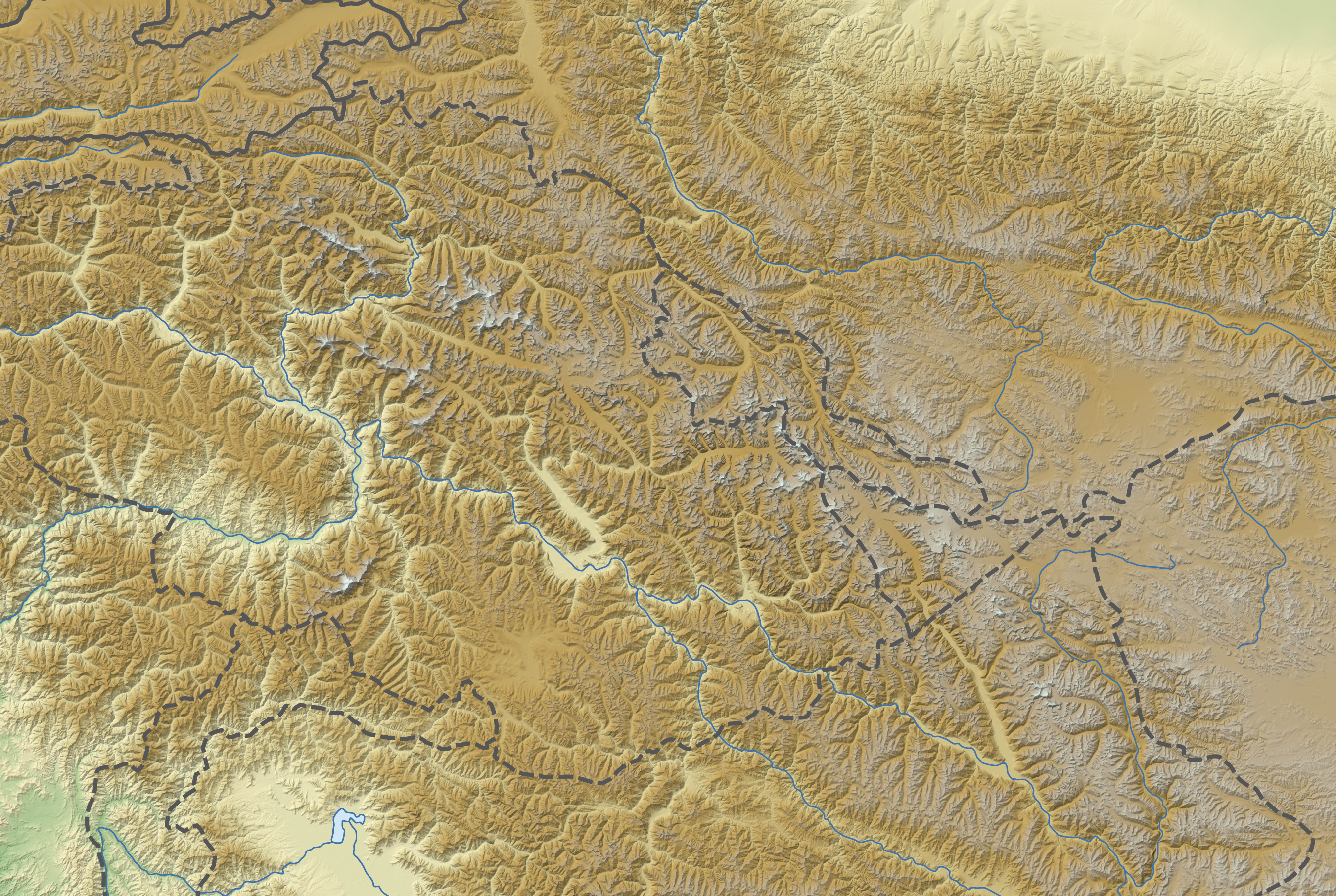
- Location within Karakoram Location within Gilgit Baltistan
- Country: Pakistan
- State or Region: Gilgit–Baltistan
- Parent range: Karakoram
- Borders on: Masherbrum Mountains

Haldi Cones are a group of mountains located in Karakoram range in Ghanche district of Gilgit Baltistan in Pakistan. The granite peaks are located in Haldi village, which is 25 km from Khaplu town. Most of these towers and cones are not climbed yet, while the peaks of Khane Valley located in the north of Haldi cones have been climbed.
