= Amburiq Mosque =

Mosque in Shigar, Pakistan

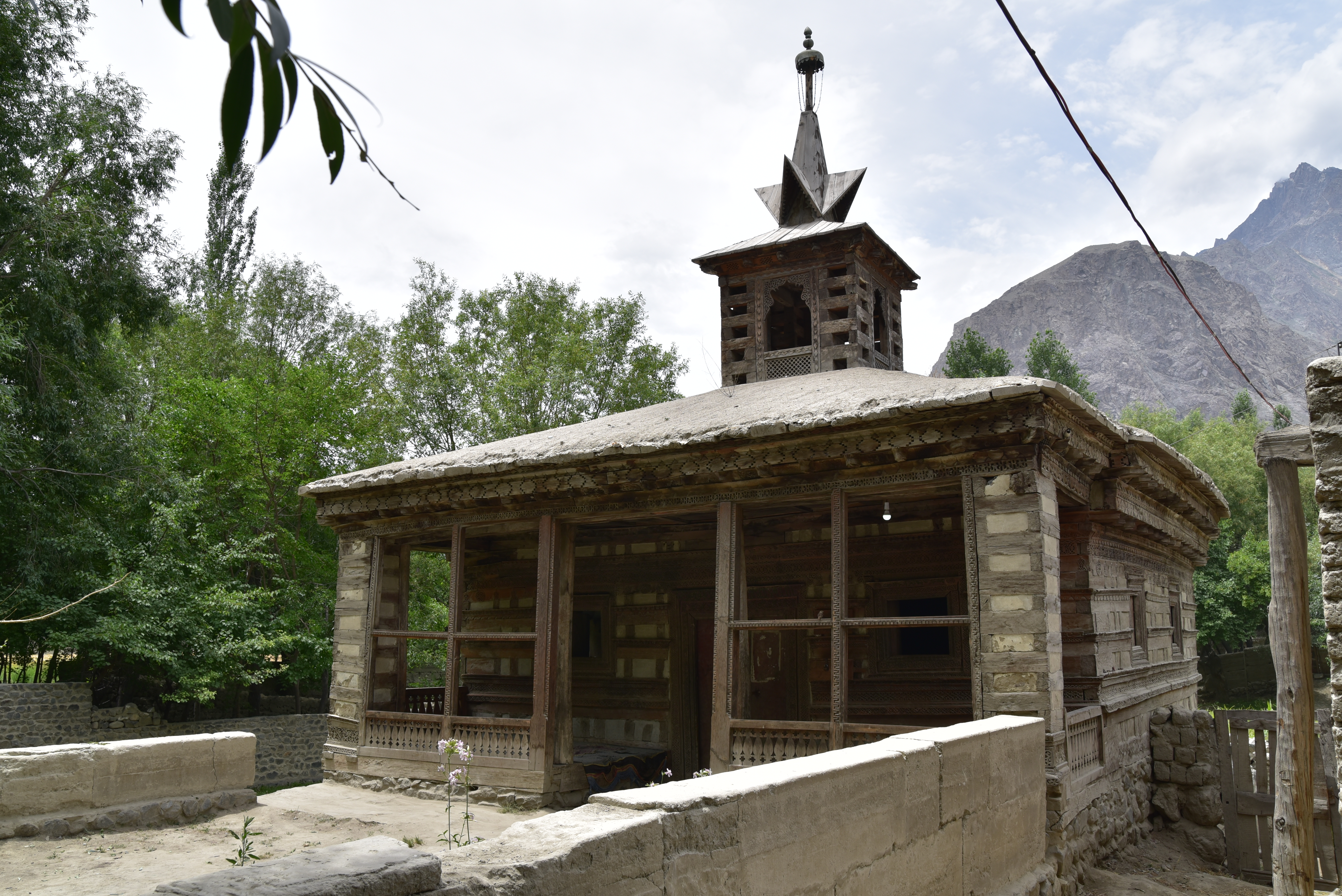
- The mosque in 2017

Religion
- Affiliation: Sunni Islam
- Sect: Sufism Noorbakshia
- Ecclesiastical or organisational status: Mosque
- Status: Active

Location
- Location: Shigar, Gilgit-Baltistan
- Country: Pakistan
- Interactive map of Amburiq Mosque
- Coordinates: 35°24′49″N 75°44′18″E

Architecture
- Type: Mosque architecture
- Style: Kashmiri; Tibetan; Islamic
- Founder: Sayed Ali Hamdani
- Completed: 14th century

Specifications
- Interior area: 63 m^{2} (680 sq ft)
- Spire: One

The Amburiq Masjid (Urdu: مسجد امبوڑک شگر) is a mosque located in Shigar, in the Gilgit-Baltistan region of Pakistan. It is one of the oldest mosques in Baltistan. The mosque was built by Sayed Ali Hamdani and is among the famous landmarks in Baltistan.

== History ==
According to local traditions, Sayed Ali Hamadani visited Shigar to proselytize the faith and established the Amburiq mosque, the first mosque in the Shigar Valley.

== Mosque Museum ==
A small museum has been established inside the mosque, which has been helping to create awareness of the historical significance of the site, and to instill a conservational approach among the local community towards socially significant structures.

== Renovation and support ==
Restoration was completed in 1998–2000. The cost of the mosque renovation was provided by the Norwegian Embassy in Islamabad, and the local community where the AKCSP provided technical assistance and supervised the project.

== Awards of Merit ==
- In 2005, UNESCO awarded Asia-Pacific Heritage Awards to the mosque.

== Gallery ==
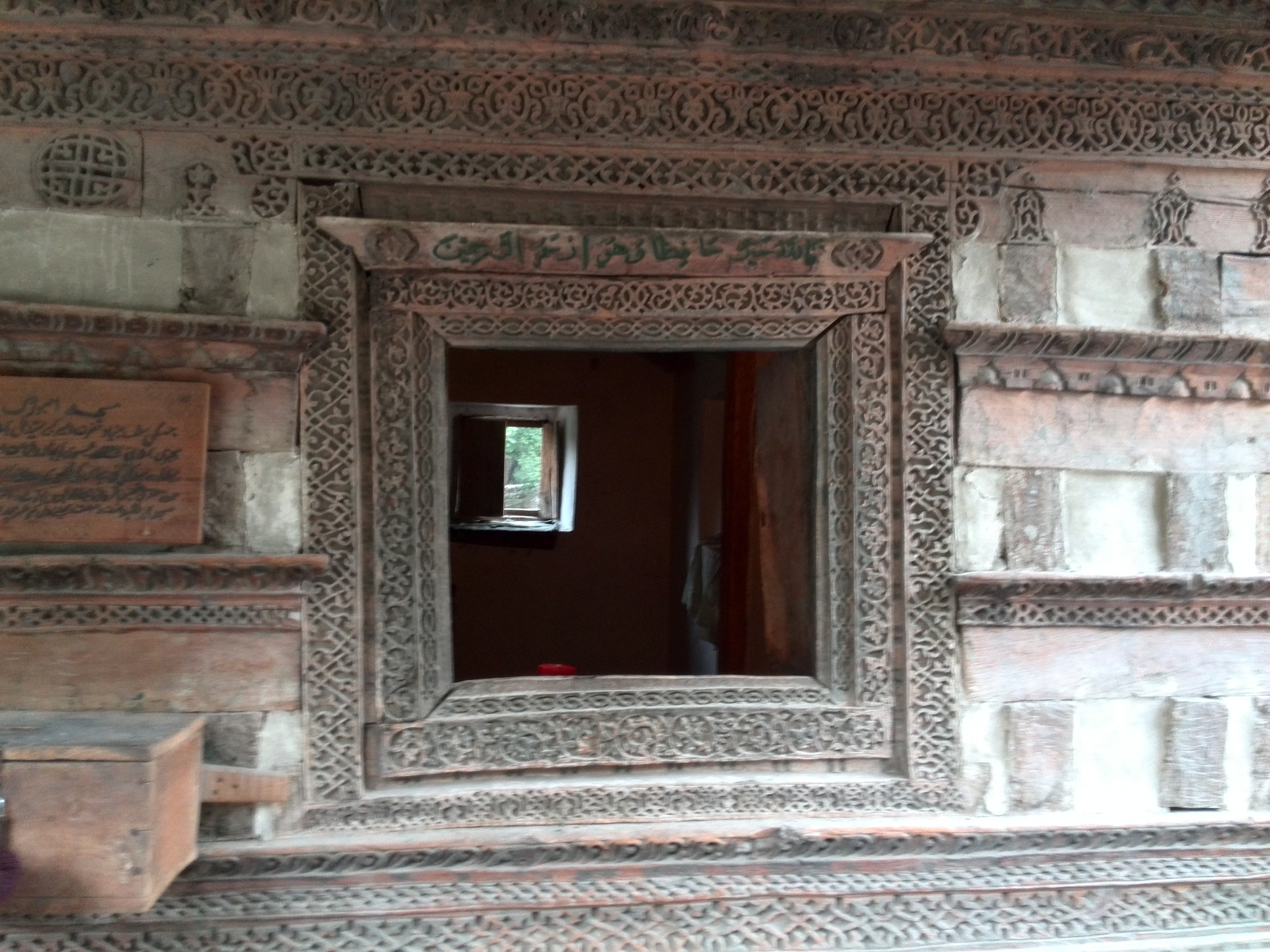
Window of the mosque

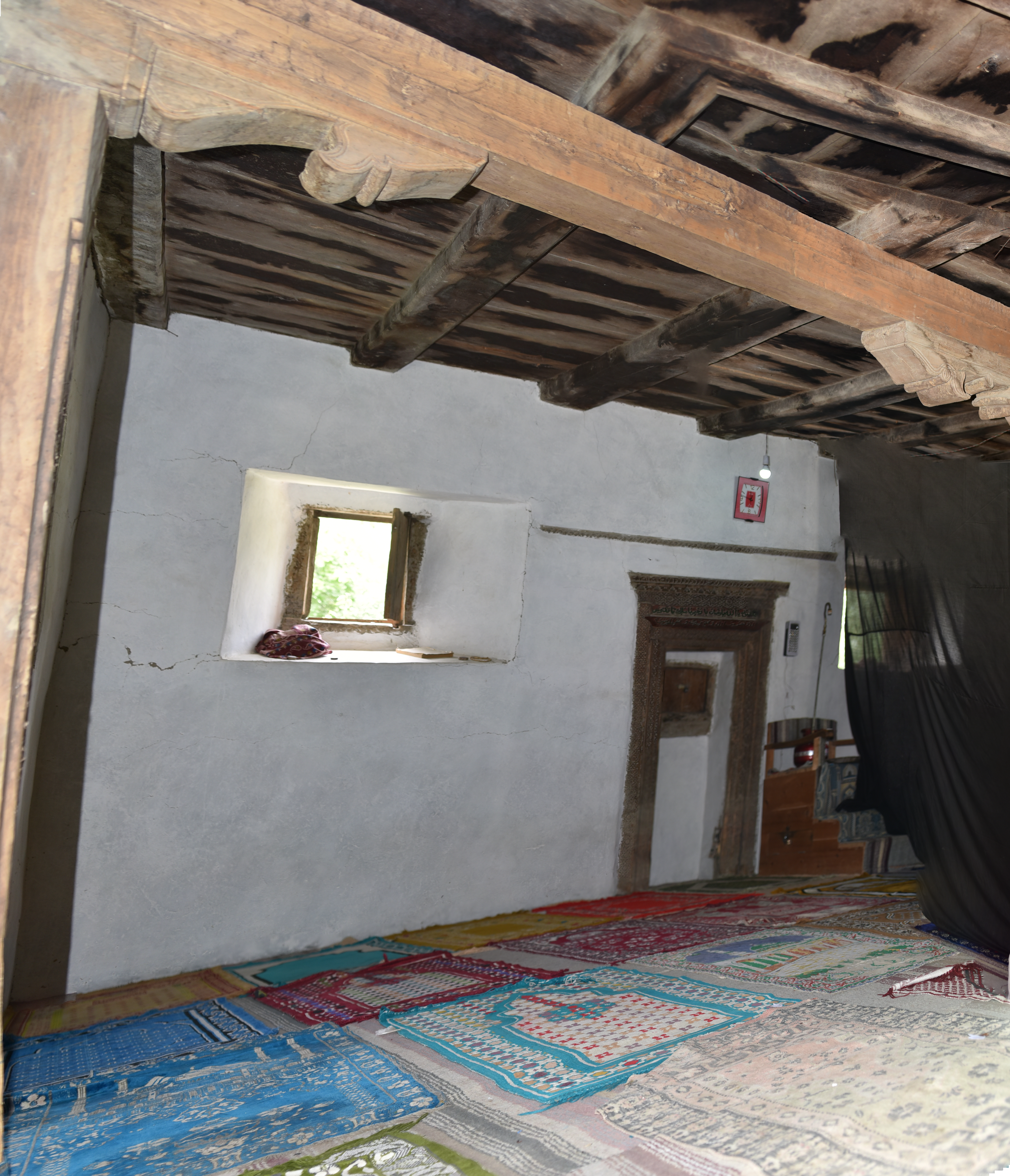
The mosque's interior

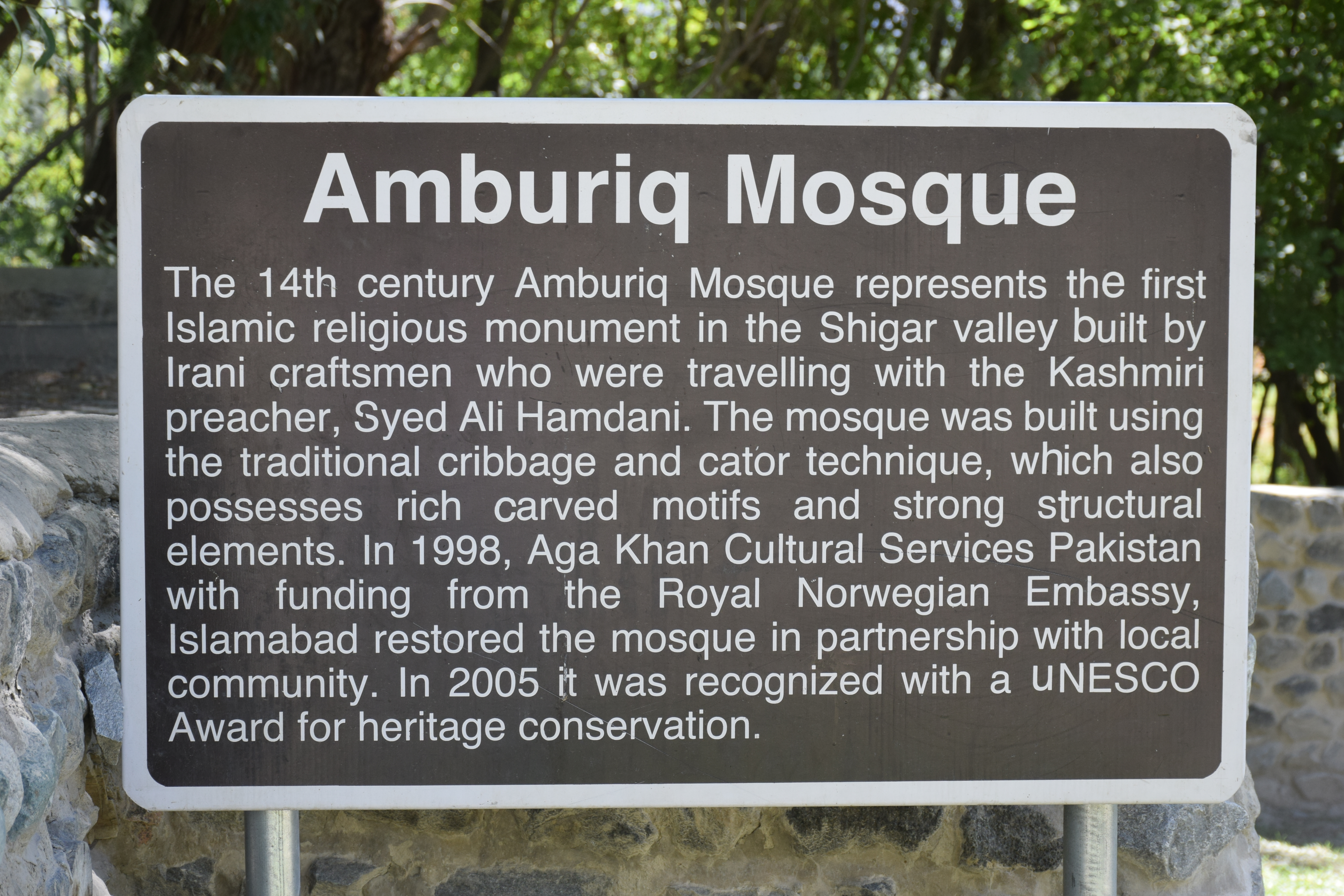
Some information about the mosque on a board

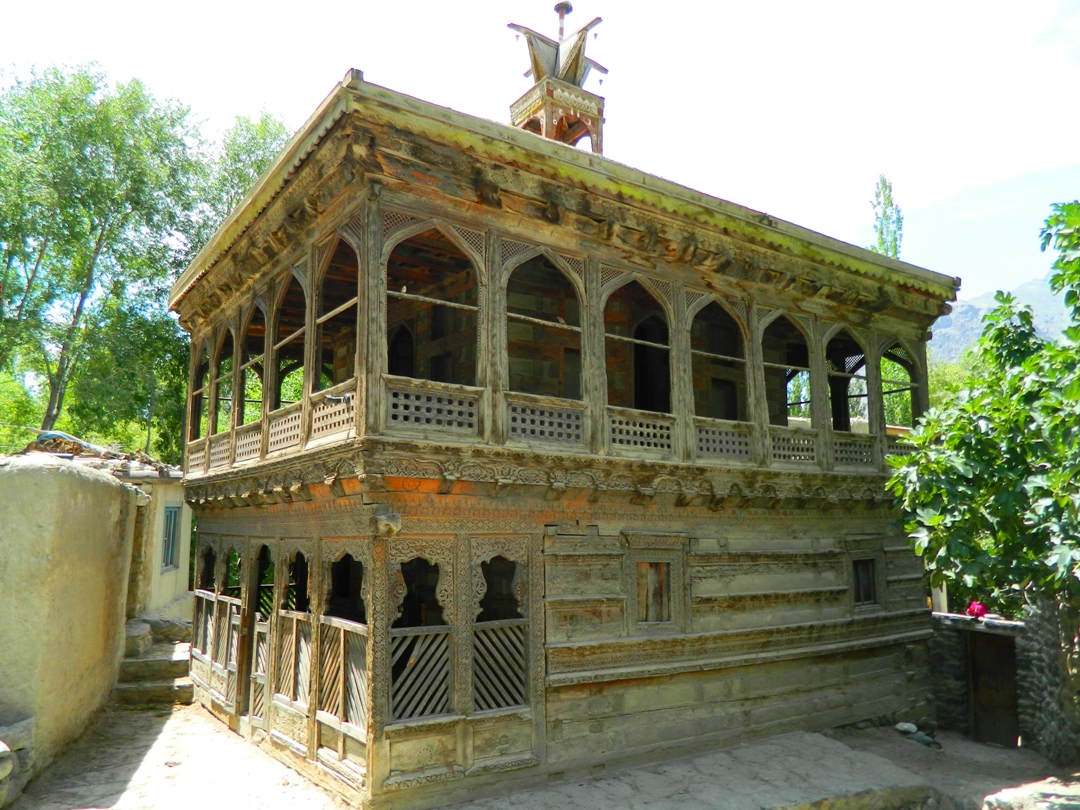
Backside of the mosque

== See also ==
- Islam in Pakistan
- List of mosques in Pakistan
- Chaqchan Mosque
- Skardu Fort Mosque
