= Khaplu =

City in Gilgit-Baltistan, Pakistan

Khaplu خپلو ཁཔ་ལུ།
- City administered by Pakistan
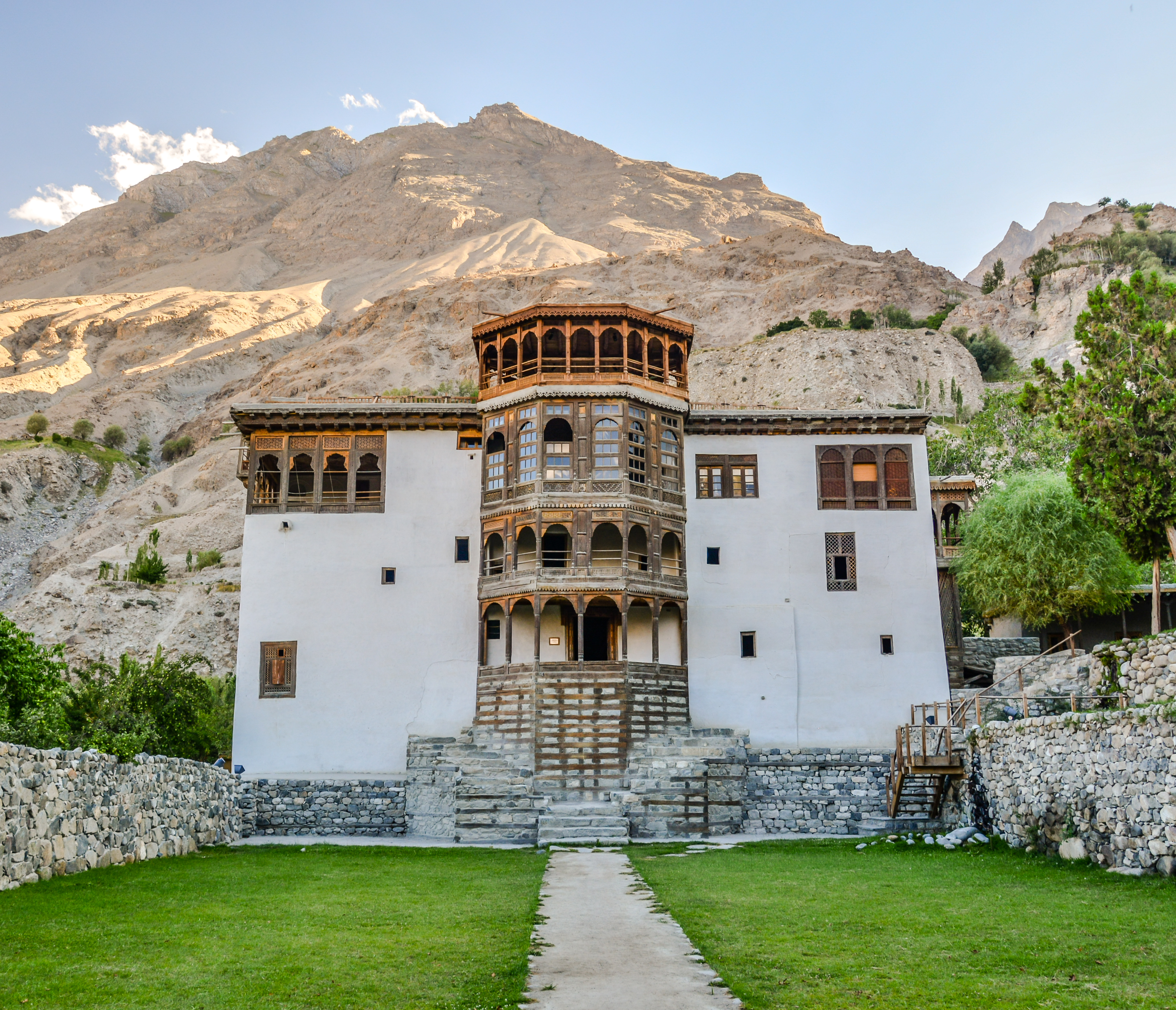
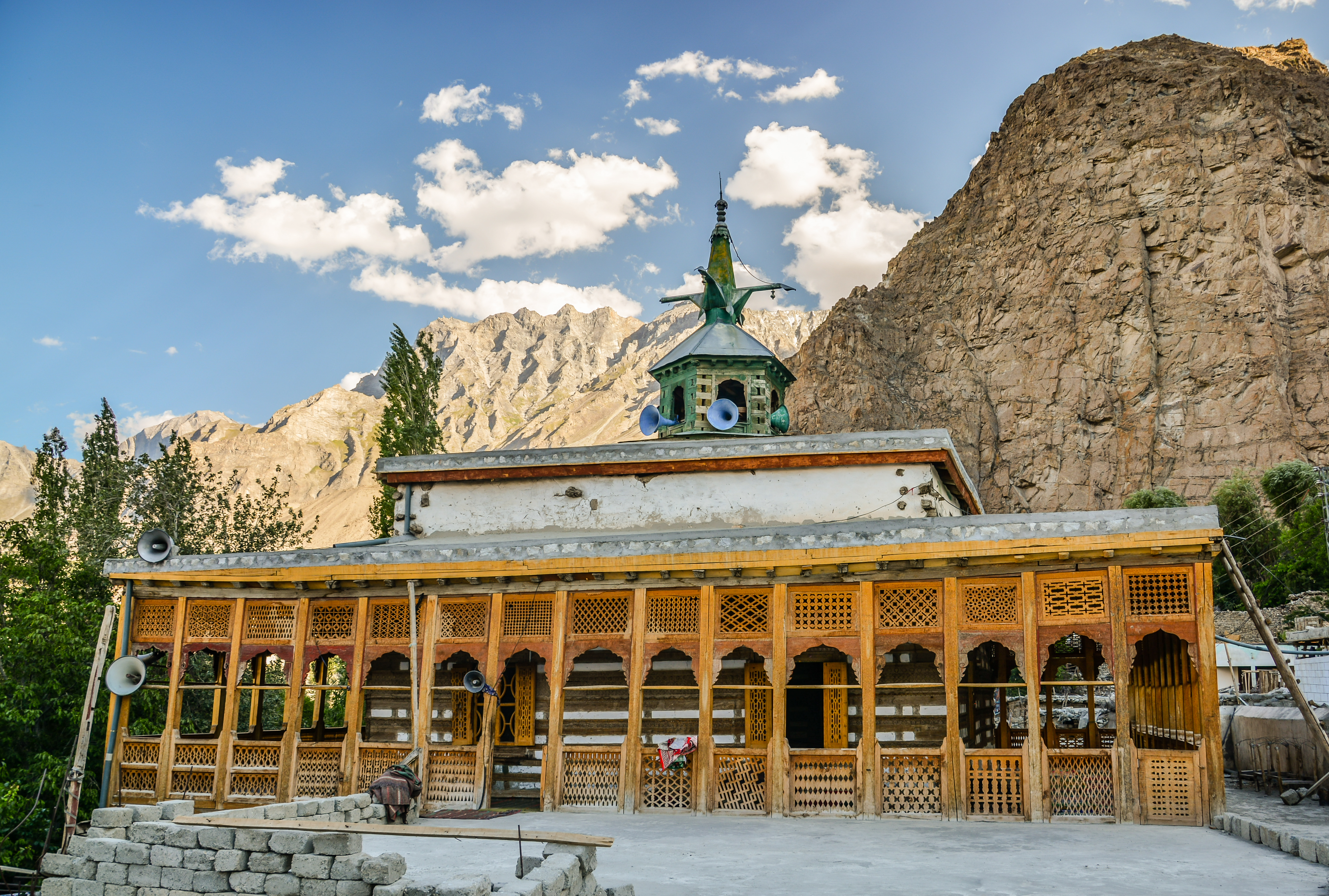
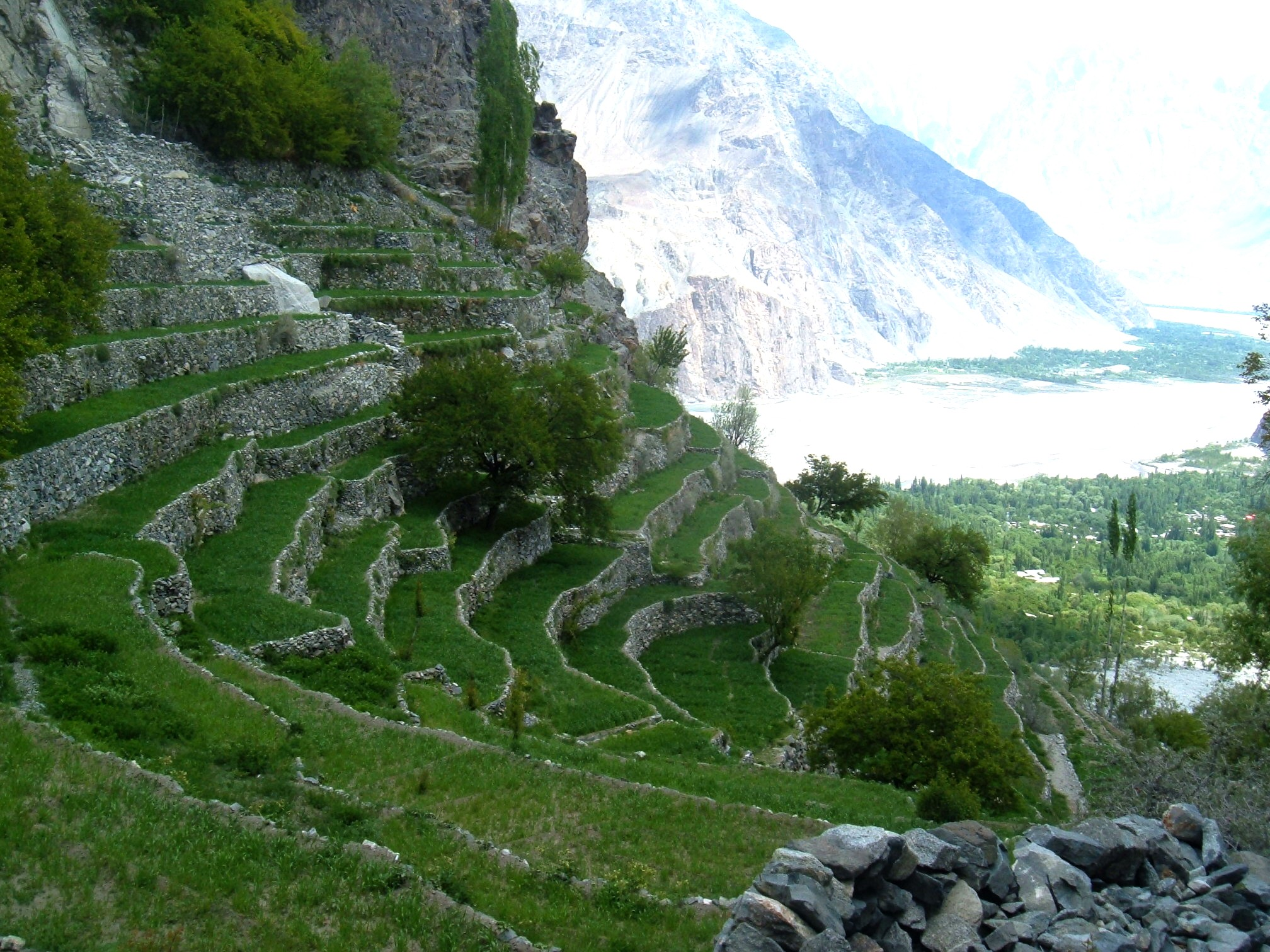
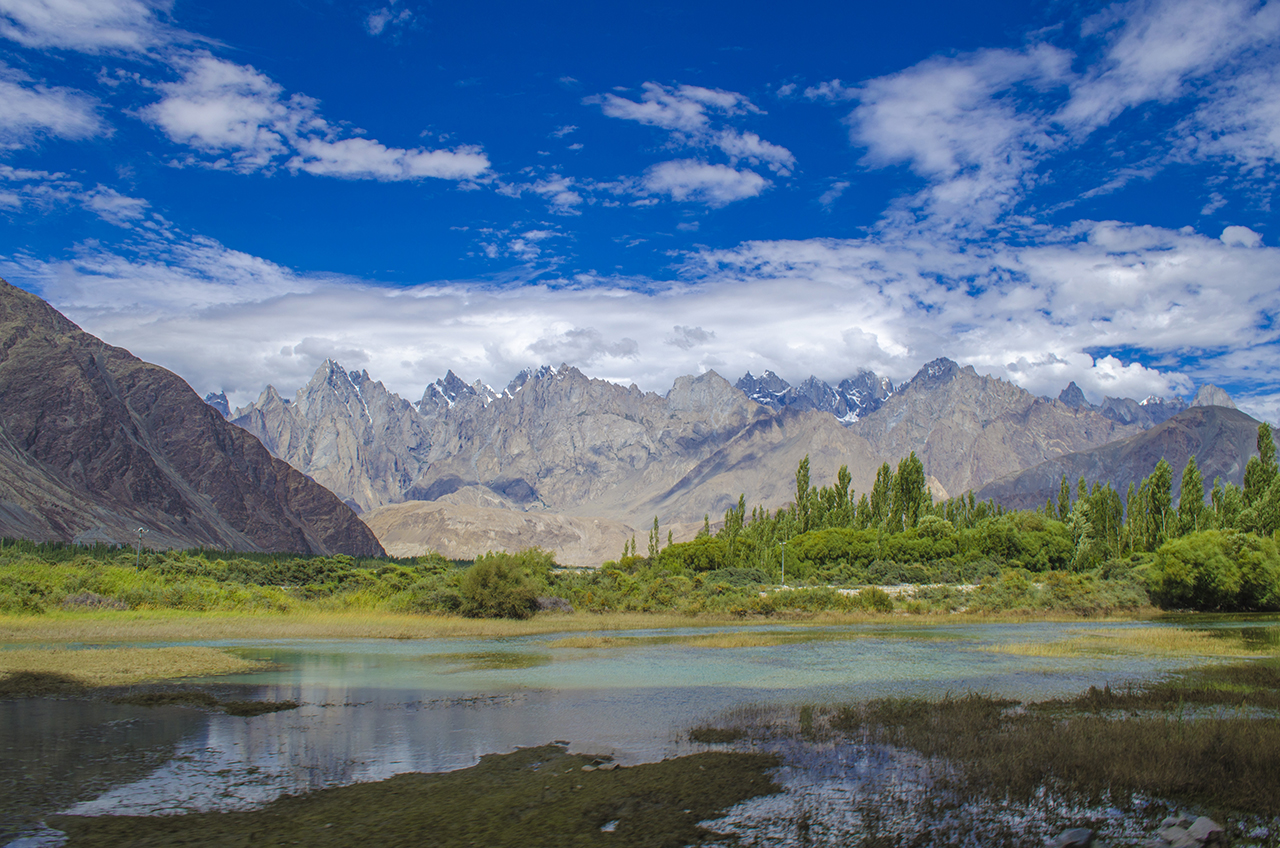
- Clockwise from the top: Khaplu Palace, Thogsikhar, Karakoram Range and Chaqchan Mosque
- Nickname: Shyok valley
- Location in Pakistan Khaplu (Pakistan)
- Coordinates: 35°10′N 76°20′E
- Administering country: Pakistan
- Autonomous territory: Gilgit Baltistan
- Baltistan division: Ghanche

Government
  - Deputy Commissioner: Adeel Haider Baryar (PAS)
- Elevation: 8,500 ft (2,600 m)

Population (2023)
  - Total: 83,000
- Time zone: UTC+5 (PST)
  - Summer (DST): UTC+6 (GMT+6)
- Postal code: 16800
- Website: Khaplu Valley, Skardu

Khaplu (Urdu: خپلو, pronounced: [xəpluː]; Balti: ཁཔ་ལུ།), also spelt Khapalu, is a city that serves as the administrative capital of the Ghanche District in Pakistan-administered Gilgit-Baltistan, within the disputed Kashmir region. Located 103 km (64 mi) east of Skardu, Khaplu was historically the second-largest kingdom in Baltistan under the Yabgo dynasty and played a key role in guarding the trade route to Ladakh along the Shyok River, near its confluence with the Indus.

Khaplu is a popular base for trekking into the Hushe Valley, which provides access to the high peaks of Masherbrum, K6, K7, and Chogolisa. The city is home to the 700-year-old mosque, Chaqchan Mosque, founded by Ameer Kabeer Syed Ali Hamadani (RA). Other notable tourist sites include Ehlie Broq, Hanjor, Thoqsi Khar, Kaldaq, and the Shyok River.

== History ==
Khaplu existed as an independent kingdom since the disintegration of the Tibetan Empire in the 10th century CE. The rulers of Khapalu used the Tibetan title of Cho ('master'), in addition to the well-known Turkish title of Yabghu. According to tradition, Ali Hamdani arrived in Khaplu in the late 14th century and converted locals to Islam. To this day, mosques and khanqahs attributed to him exist in the region.

The first mention of the former small kingdom called Khápula is in Mirza Haidar's work Tarikh-i-Rashidi, which lists the Khaplu district of Balti(stan). Khaplu was also very well-known in the 17th and 18th centuries due to its close political and family ties with the royal family of the neighbouring country of Ladakh.

The first European to visit Khaplu was probably Captain Claude Martin Wade, who mentioned "Chílú" in 1835 in an essay in the Journal of the Asiatic Society of Bengal. Subsequently, William Moorcroft and George Trebeck wrote in their 1841 book: "Kafalun is a province west of Nobra, on the left bank of the Shayuk." Godfrey Vigne was in the area in 1835–1838.

Alexander Cunningham, who did not visit Baltistan, published a brief geographical description of Khaplu and a genealogy of its rulers in 1854. Thomas Thomson travelled there in November 1847 and briefly described a place of remarkable beauty. Jane Duncan reached Khaplu in 1904 and stayed there for three weeks. De Filippi, who reached Khaplu in 1913, characterized the site as follows: "It is, perhaps, the loveliest oasis in all the region." Further information on Khaplu was included in a travel report by Arthur Neve.

== Geography ==
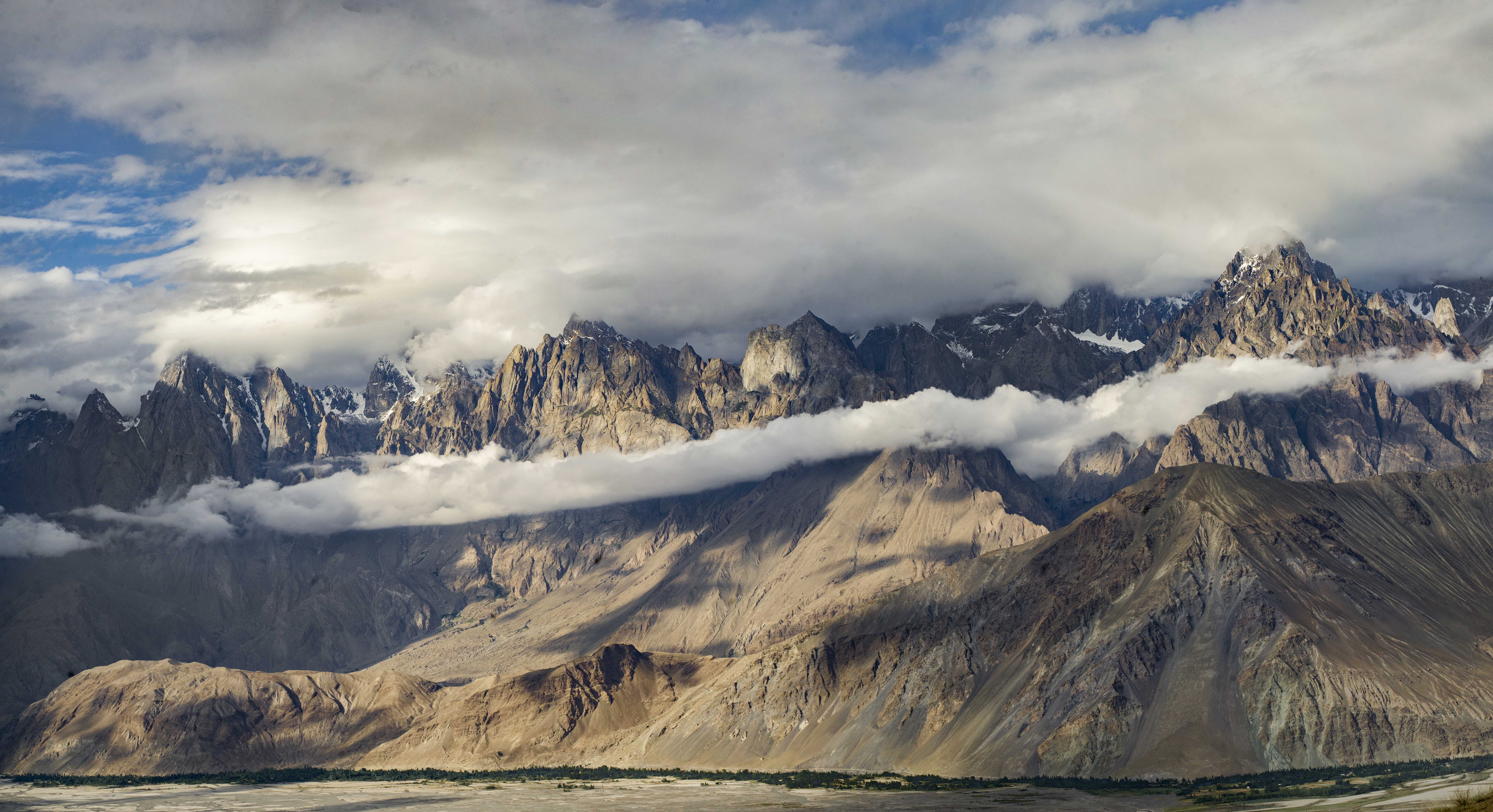
Haldi Cones

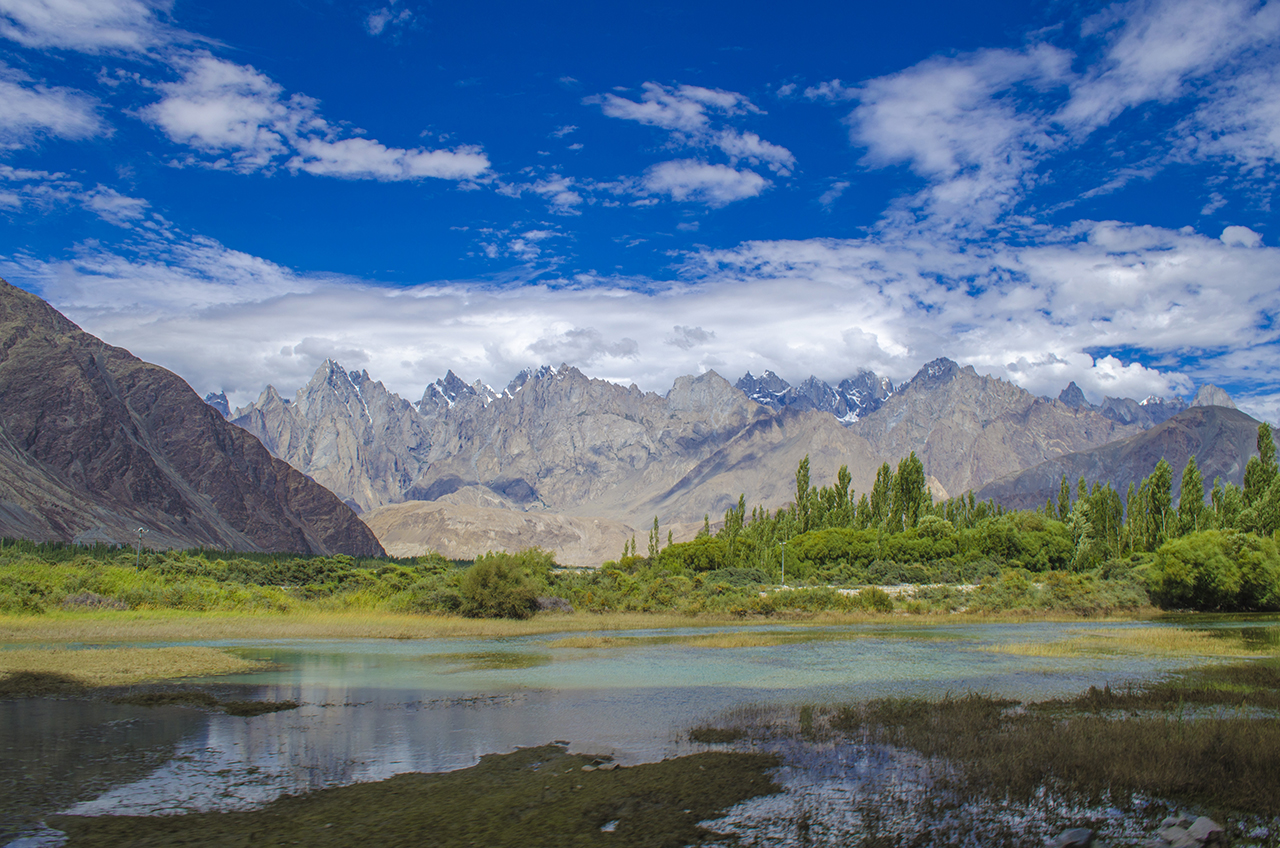
Khaplu lies at the base of the Karakoram Range.

In contrast to Skardu and Shigar, the territory of Khaplu was not focused on a single large river valley, but was instead spread over the three valleys of Shyok, namely on the territory of the present town of Khaplu, the valley of Thalle River, and the Hushe/Saltoro Valley. The area around the mouth of the river in the Thalle Shyok formed the western border of the kingdom.

Today Ghanche District, whose administrative centre is located in Khaplu, covers Balghar and Daghoni in addition to the mouth of the Indus in Shyok. It includes the former Kingdom of Kiris as a military bulwark against incursions of the Skardu and Shigar. In Haldi, in eastern Hushe/Saltoro Tal, was another fortress.

== Tourism ==
Raja Palace is a beautiful building and the last and best Tibetan-style palace in Pakistan. Khaplu Khanqah is attributed to Mir Mukhtar Akhyar and was built in 1712 AD/1124 AH.

Khaplu is the gateway to Masherbrum Peak, K-7, K-6, Chogolisa for mountaineers and Gondogoro la, Gondogoro Peak, Saraksa Glacier, Gondogoro Glacier, Masherbrum Glacier, Aling Glacier, Machlu Broq, Thaely La, Daholi Lake, Kharfaq Lake, Dongsa View Point and Dongsa Chair lift Kuru, Ghangche Lake and Bara Lake for trekkers. There is rafting on the Shyok River and rock climbing places like Biamari Thoqsikhar, DowoKraming (hot spring) and Dongsa Rock Kuro (Dongsa viewpoint).

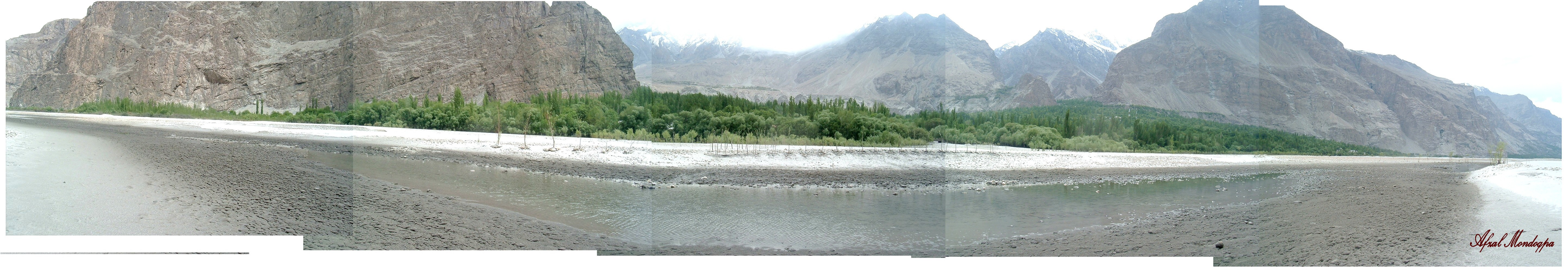
Panoramic view of Khaplu

== Architecture ==
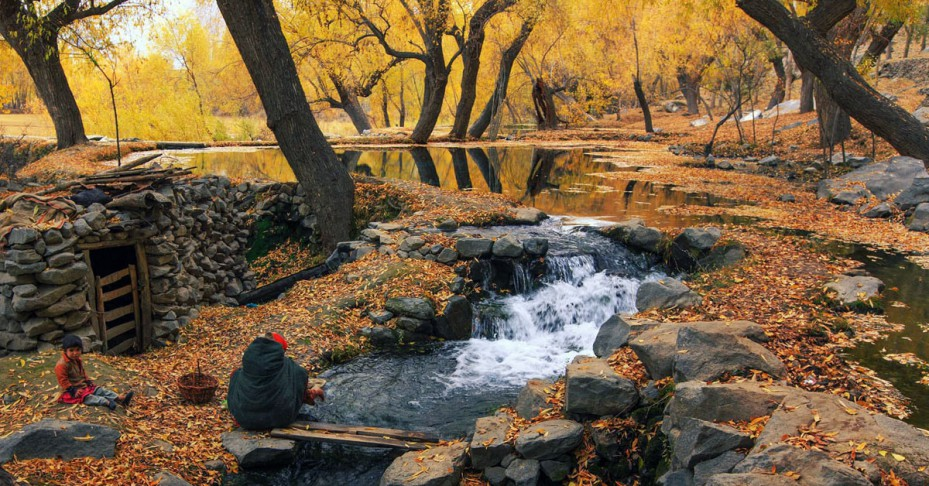
Khaplu in autumn.

The most important religious monuments in Khaplu are the 14th-century Chaqchan Mosque and the Khanqa prayer hall. The latter was built in 1712 by Sayyed Mohammad, a saint of the Islamic Nūrbkahshīya sect, whose Astana grave monument is in the immediate vicinity. The Astana grave monument has been restored by the Aga Khan Trust for Culture Pakistan and thereby saved from total disintegration.

== Transport ==
Khaplu is accessible only by road. The normal road into Khaplu is a link road from the Skardu Valley. Four or five other roads link to Kashmir, Ladakh and Yarqand.

== Bibliography ==
- Shridhar Kaul: Ladakh through the Ages, towards a New Identity. Indus Publishing 1992, ISBN 81-85182-75-2 (restricted online copy (Google Books))
- Sarina Singh, Lindsay Brown, Paul Clammer, Rodney Cocks, John Mock, Kimberley O'Neil: Pakistan & the Karakoram Highway. Lonely Planet 2008, ISBN 1-74104-542-8, pp. 292–293 (restricted online copy (Google Books))

== See also ==
- Khaplu Palace
