= Shrine =

Dedicated holy or sacred place

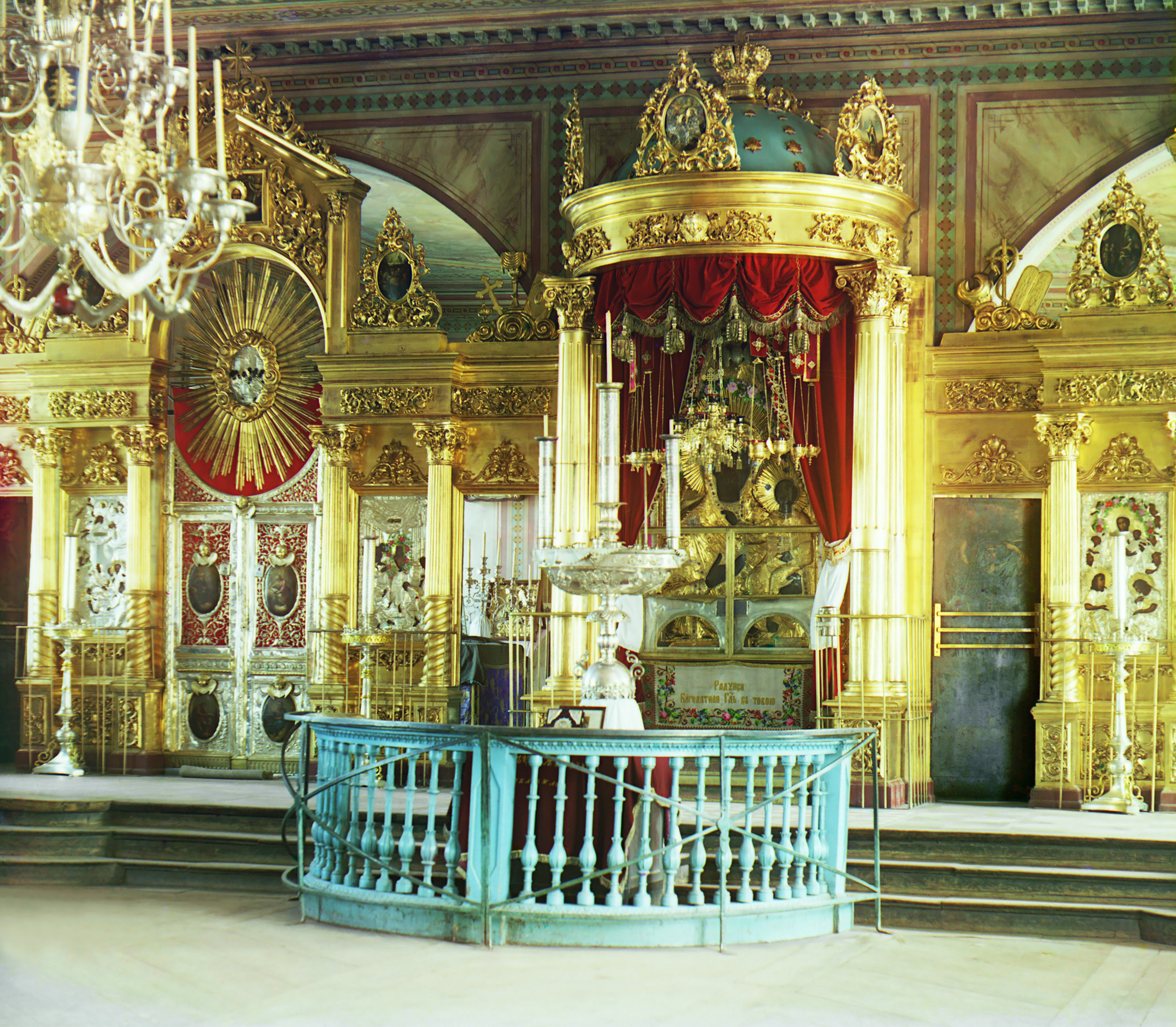
The shrine of the Hodegetria at the Assumption Cathedral in Smolensk, Russia, photographed by Sergey Prokudin-Gorsky (1912).

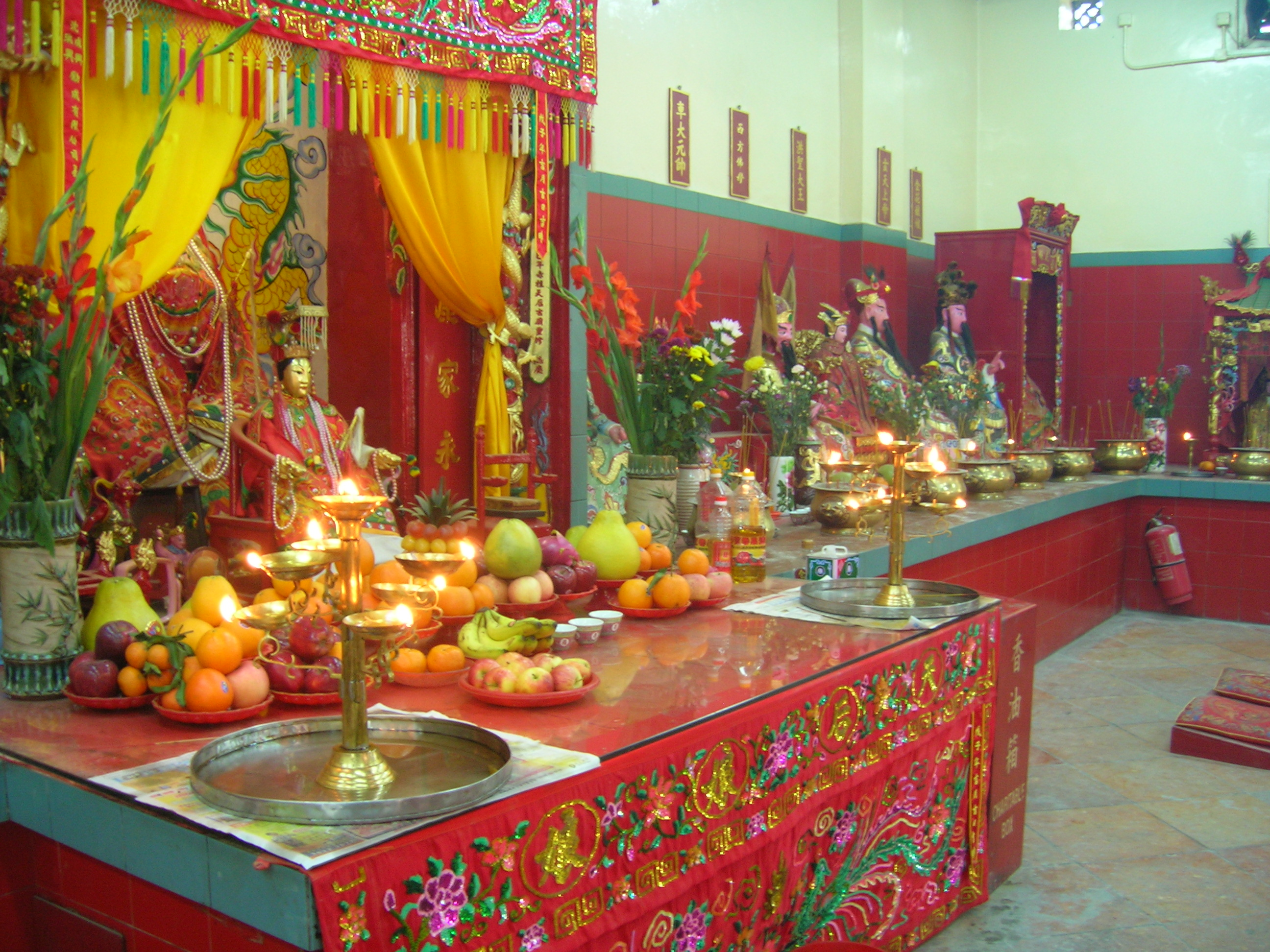
Shrine to Tin Hau at Repulse Bay, Southern District, Hong Kong.

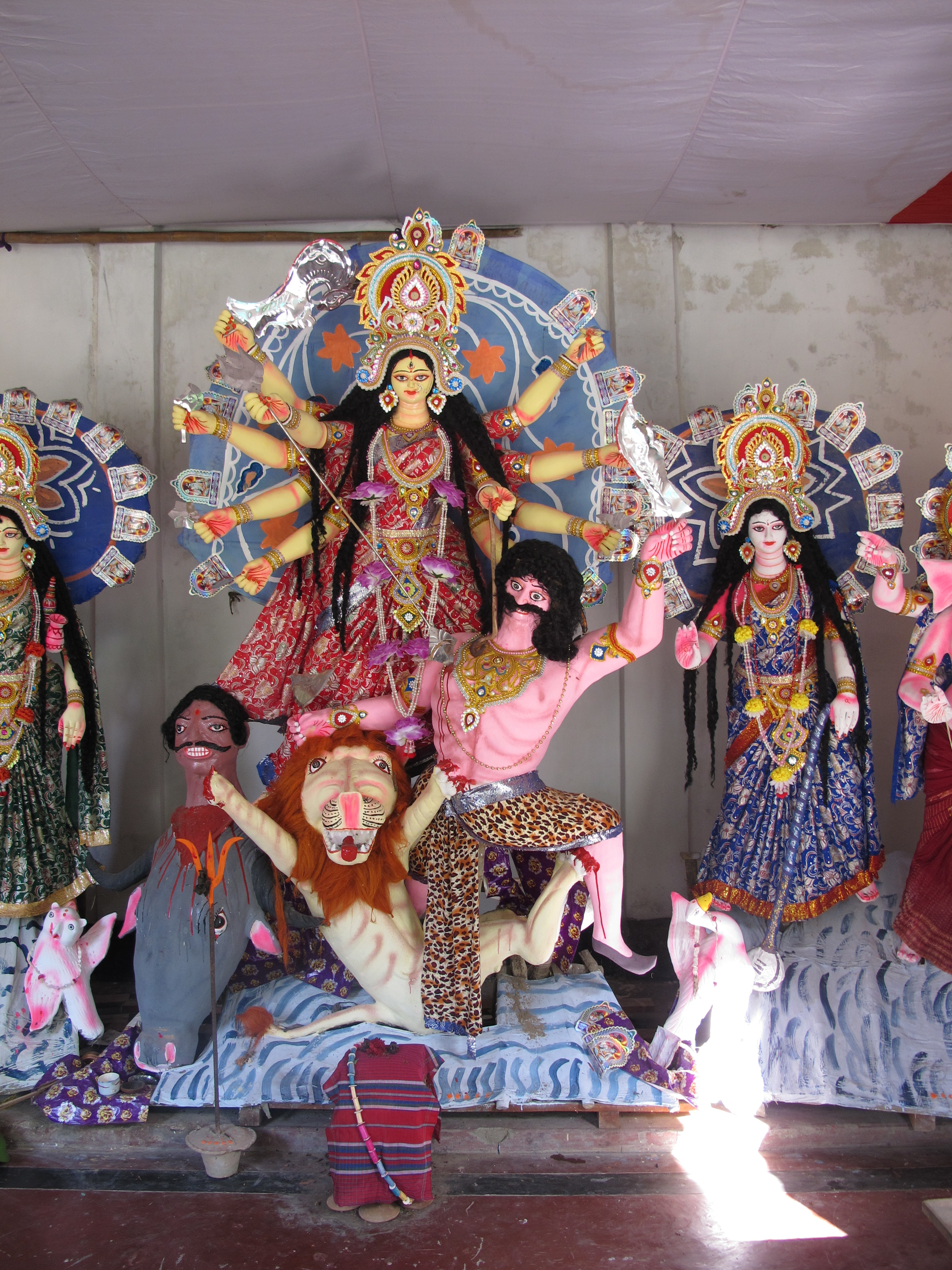
Shrine to Durga in Panam City

A shrine (Latin: scrinium "case or chest for books or papers"; Old French: escrin "box or case") is a sacred space dedicated to a specific deity, ancestor, hero, martyr, saint, daemon, or similar figure of respect, wherein they are venerated and/or worshipped. Shrines often contain idols, relics, or other such objects associated with the figure being venerated. A shrine at which votive offerings are made is called an altar.

Shrines are found in many of the world's religions, including Christianity, Islam, Hinduism, Buddhism, Chinese folk religion, Shinto, indigenous Philippine folk religions, and Germanic paganism as well as in secular and non-religious settings such as a war memorial. Shrines can be found in various settings, such as churches, temples, cemeteries, or as household shrines. Portable shrines are also found in some cultures.

== Types of shrines ==
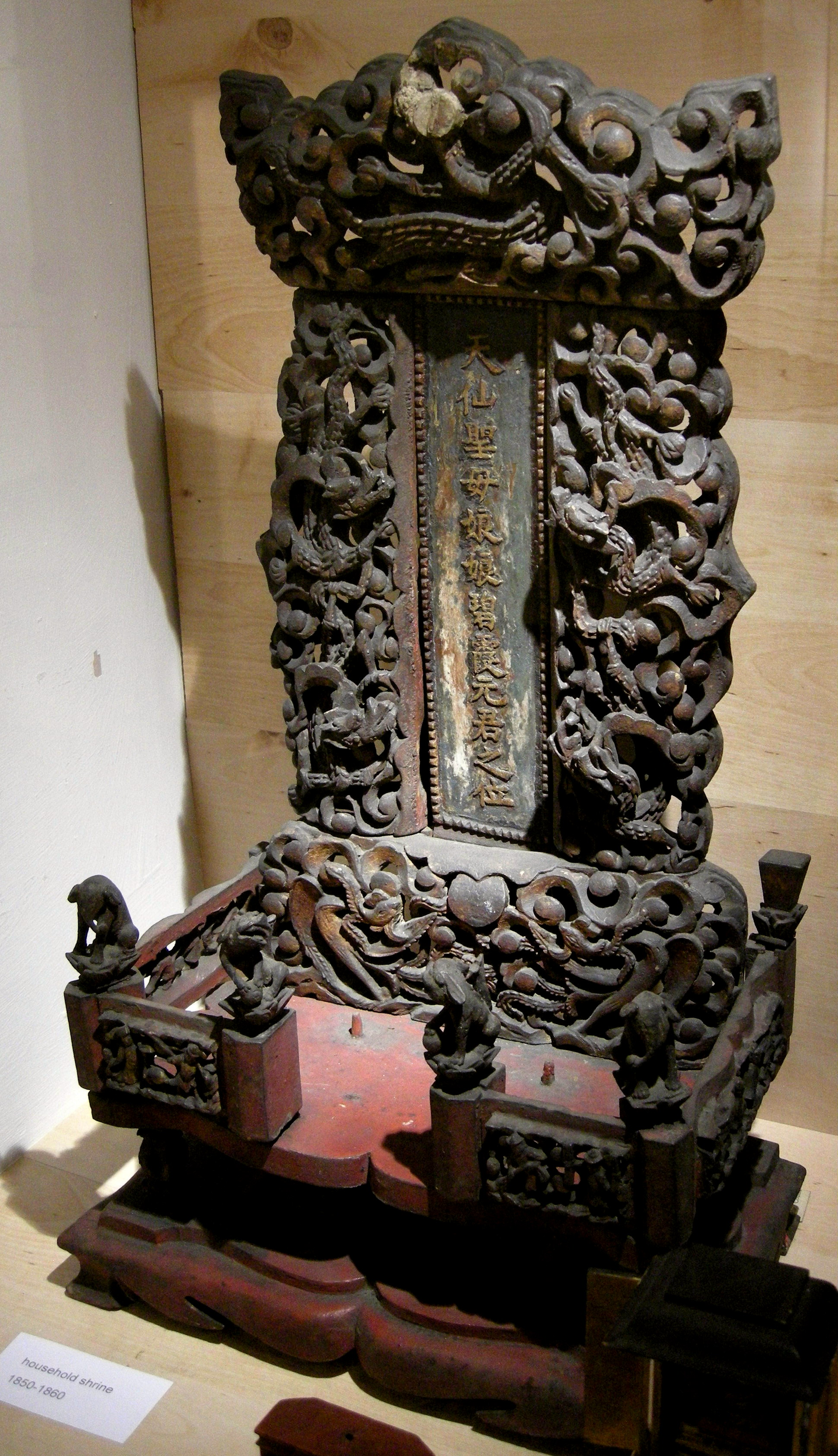
Chinese Taoist tablet household shrine dedicated to Bixia Yuanjun (1850–1860), Bankfield Museum

=== Temple shrines ===
Many shrines are located within buildings and in the temples designed specifically for worship, such as a church in Christianity, or a mandir in Hinduism. A shrine here is usually the center of attention in the building and is given a place of prominence. In such cases, adherents of the faith assemble within the building in order to venerate the deity at the shrine. In classical temple architecture, the shrine may be synonymous with the cella.

=== Household shrines ===
Historically, in Hinduism, Buddhism, and Christianity, and also in modern faiths, such as Neopaganism, a shrine can commonly be found within the home or shop. This shrine is usually a small structure or a setup of pictures and figurines dedicated to a deity that is part of the official religion, to ancestors or to a localised household deity.

=== Yard shrines ===
Small outdoor yard shrines are found at the bottom of many peoples' gardens, following various religions, including Balinese Hinduism and Christianity. Many consist of a statue of Christ, the Virgin Mary or a saint, on a pedestal or in an alcove, while others may be elaborate booths without ceilings, some include paintings, statuary, and architectural elements, such as walls, roofs, glass doors and ironwork fences.

In the United States, some Christians have small yard shrines; some of these resemble side altars, since they are composed of a statue placed in a niche or grotto; this type is colloquially referred to as a bathtub madonna.

=== Wayside shrines ===
Religious images, usually in some sort of small shelter, placed by a road or pathway, sometimes in a settlement or at a crossroads.

== Religious shrines ==
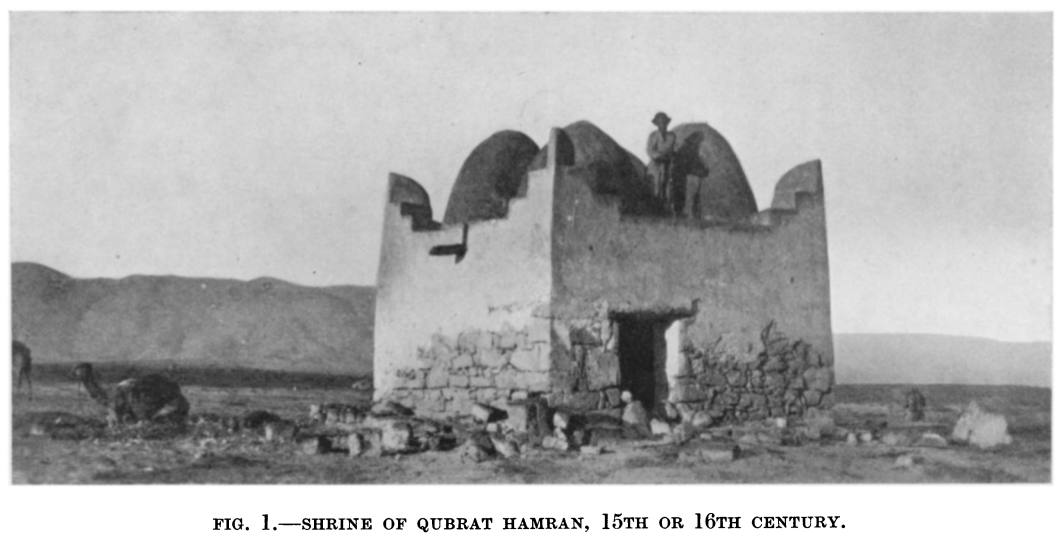
Shrine of Qubrat Hamran, South Arabia, dating from the 15th or 16th century.

Shrines are found in many religions. As distinguished from a temple, a shrine usually houses a particular relic or cult image, which is the object of worship or veneration. A shrine may also be constructed to set apart a site which is thought to be particularly holy, as opposed to being placed for the convenience of worshipers. Shrines therefore attract the practice of pilgrimage.

=== Christianity ===
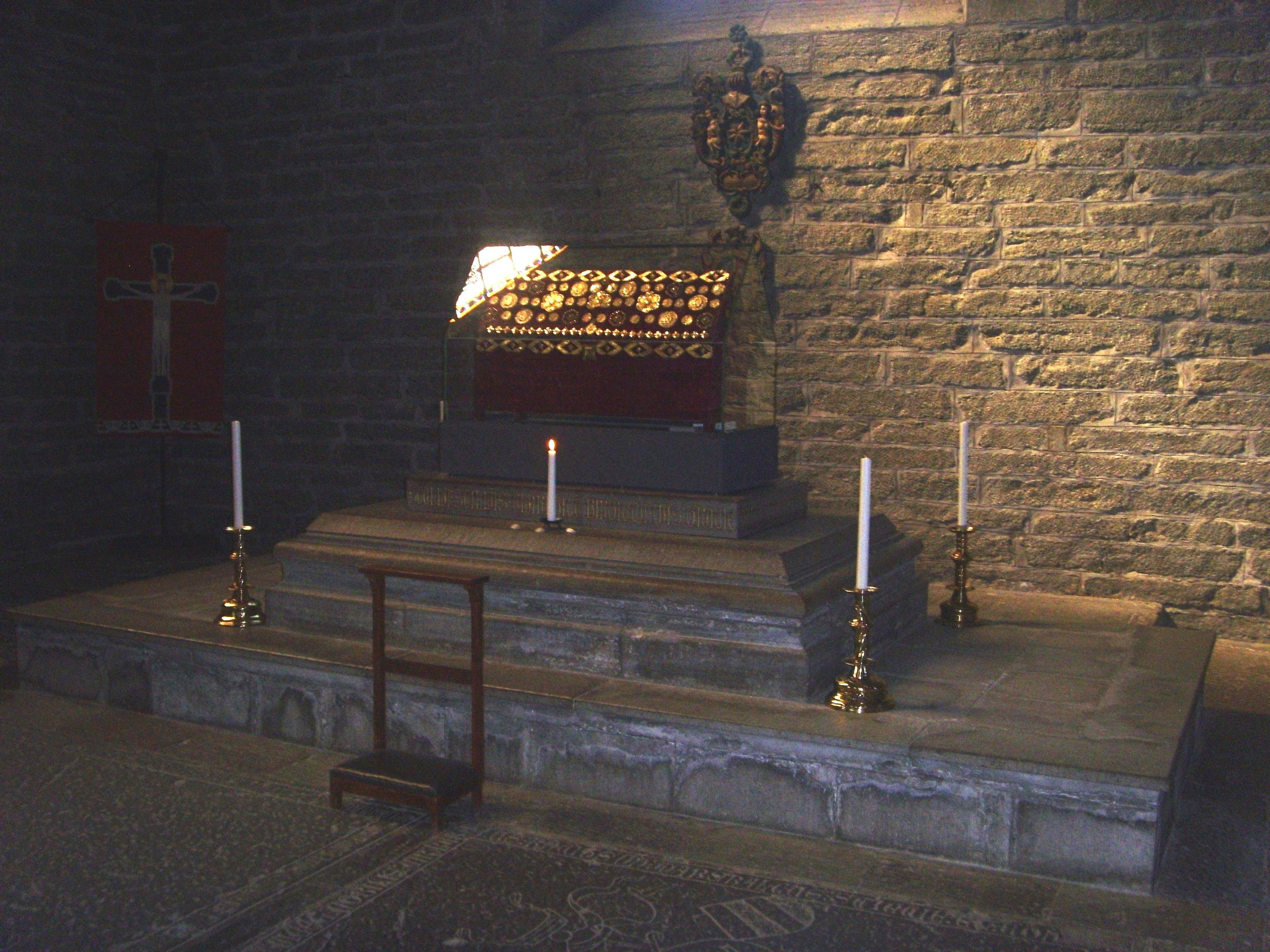
Evangelical-Lutheran reliquary shrine of Saint Bridget of Sweden in Vadstena Abbey Church, a popular place of pilgrimage among members of the Church of Sweden

Shrines are found in many forms of Christianity, but not all. Catholicism, the largest branch of Christianity, has many shrines, as do Orthodox Christianity, Evangelical-Lutheranism, and some forms of Anglicanism.

==== Catholicism ====
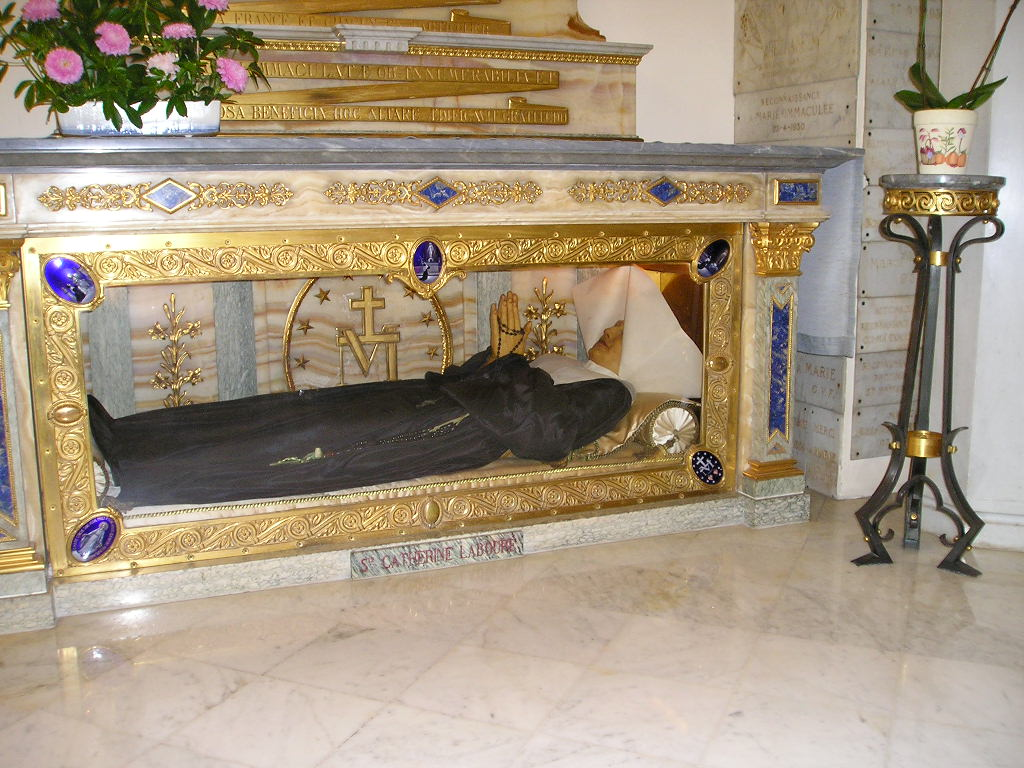
Catholic shrine: glass coffin of Saint Catherine Labouré

The Catholic 1983 Code of Canon Law, canons 1230 and 1231 reads: "The term shrine means a church or other sacred place which, with the approval of the local Ordinary, is by reason of special devotion frequented by the faithful as pilgrims." In the Catholic Church, a local diocesan bishop or archbishop can designate a local (arch)diocesan shrine. For a shrine to be a national shrine, the approval of the country's Episcopal Conference is required. Similarly, the approval of the Holy See at the Vatican in Rome is required for it to be international.

In unofficial, colloquial Catholic use, the term "shrine" is a niche or alcove in churches, especially larger ones, used by parishioners when praying privately. Shrines are always centered on some image (for instance, a statue, painting, mural or mosaic) of Jesus Christ, of Mary, mother of Jesus, or of a saint, and may have had a reredos behind them. They were formerly also called devotional altars, since before the Second Vatican Council they contained small side altars or bye-altars. Today, Mass would not necessarily be celebrated at them, and they are simply used to aid or give a visual focus for prayers.

=== Islam ===
Islam's holiest structure, the Kaaba (within the Al-Haram Mosque) in the city of Mecca, though an ancient temple (in the sense of a "house of God"), may be seen as a shrine due to it housing a respected relic called the Hajar al-Aswad and also being the partial focus of the world's largest pilgrimage practice, the Hajj. A few yards away, the mosque also houses the Maqam Ibrahim ("Abraham's station") shrine containing a petrosomatoglyph (of feet) associated with the patriarch and his son Ishmael's building of the Kaaba in Islamic tradition. The Green Dome sepulcher of the Islamic prophet Muhammad (where his burial chamber also contains the tombs of his friend Abu Bakr and close companion Umar) in Medina, housed in the Masjid an-Nabawi ("The Mosque of the Prophet"), occurs as a greatly venerated place and is important as a site of pilgrimage among Muslims.

==== Sunni Islam ====
The Data Durbar Shrine, Lahore, Pakistan

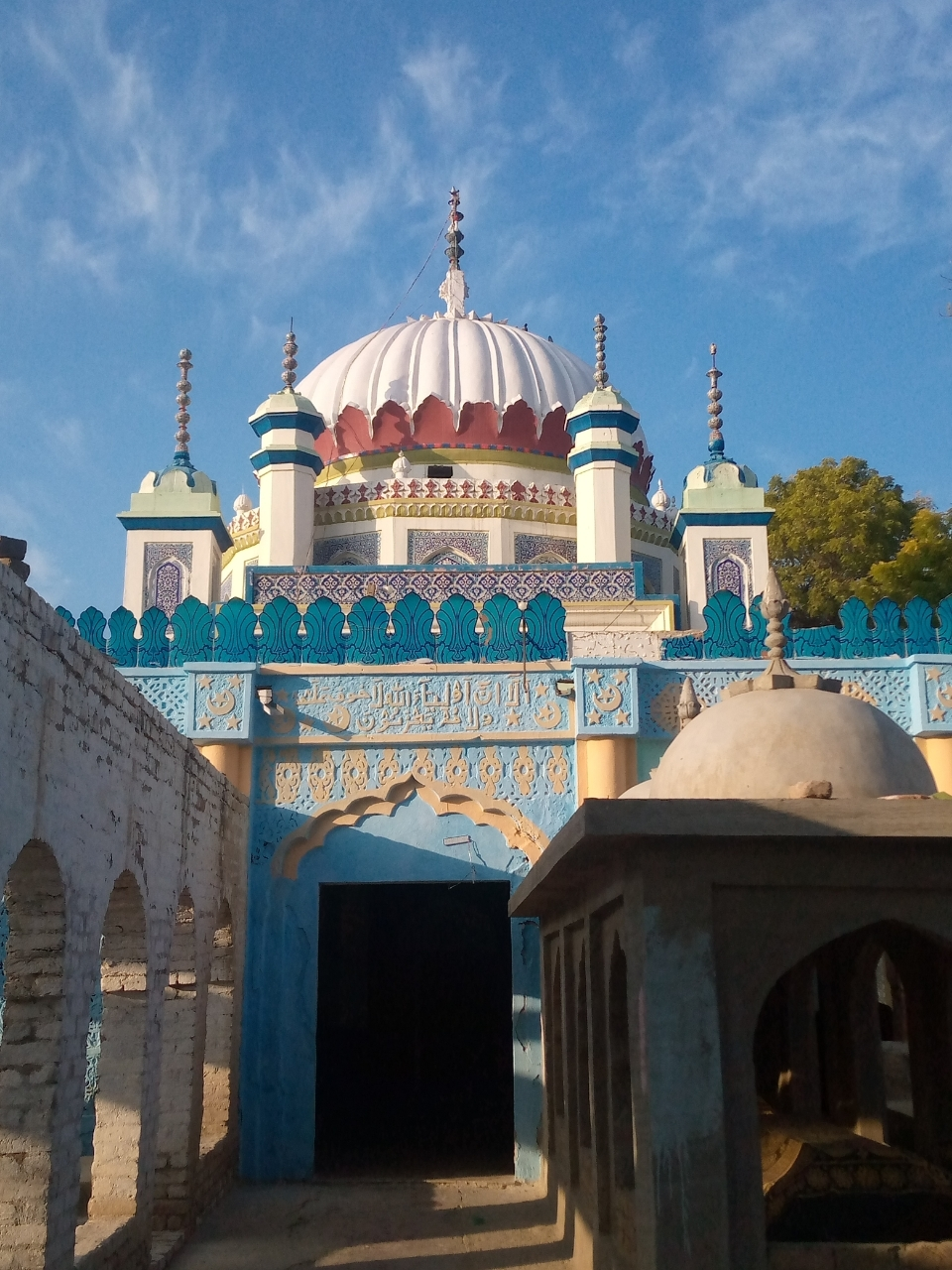
The Shrine of Pir Hadi Hassan Bux Shah Jilani, Duthro Sharif Sindh, Pakistan

Two of the oldest and notable Islamic shrines are the Dome of the Rock and the smaller Dome of the Chain built on the Temple Mount in Jerusalem. The former was built over the rock that marked the site of the Jewish Temple and according to Islamic tradition, was the point of departure of Muhammad's legendary ascent heavenwards (al-Mi'raj).

More than any other shrines in the Muslim world, the tomb of Muhammad is considered a source of blessings for the visitor. Among sayings attributed to Muhammad include one stated as: "He who visits my grave will be entitled to my intercession." Visiting Muhammad's tomb after the pilgrimage is considered by the majority of Sunni legal scholars to be recommended.

The early scholars of the salaf, Ahmad Ibn Hanbal (d. 241 AH), Ishaq Ibn Rahwayh (d. 238 SH), Abdullah ibn Mubarak (d. 189 AH) and Imam Shafi'i (d. 204 AH) all permitted the practice of ziyāra to Muhammad's tomb. The hadith scholar Qadi Ayyad (d. 554 AH) stated that visiting Muhammad was "a Sunna of the Muslims on which there was consensus, and a good and desirable deed."

Ibn Hajar al-Asqalani (d. 852 AH) explicitly stated that travelling to visit the tomb of Muhammad was "one of the best of actions and the noblest of pious deeds with which one draws near to God, and its legitimacy is a matter of consensus." Similarly, Ibn Qudamah (d. 620 AH) considered ziyāra of Muhammad to be recommended and also seeking intercession directly from Muhammad at his grave.

The tombs of other Muslim religious figures are also respected. The son of Ahmad ibn Hanbal, one of the primary jurists of Sunnism, reportedly stated that he would prefer to be buried near the mausoleum of a saintly person than his own father. While in some parts of the Muslim world the mausoleums of the tombs are seen as simply places of ziyāra of a religious figure's gravesite (Mazār/Maqbara), in others (such as the Indian subcontinent) they are treated as proper shrines (Dargah).

===== Opposition to tomb shrines by the Salafi and Wahhabi groups =====
Many modern Islamic reformers oppose the building (and sometimes the visitation of) tomb shrines, viewing it as a deviation from true Islam. This mainly includes followers of the Wahhabi and Salafi movements, which believe that shrines over graves encourage idolatry/polytheism (shirk) and that there is a risk of worshipping other than God (the dead).

The founder of the Wahhabi movement, Muhammad ibn Abd al-Wahhab derived the prohibition to build mosques over graves from a hadith attributed to the Muhammad in which he said "May God curse the Jews and Christians who make the graves of their prophets into places of worship; do not imitate them." Additionally, he commanded leveling of the graves (taswiyat al-qubur), which the scholar Imam Al-Shafi'i supported.

The Wahhabi movement was heavily influenced by the works of the medieval Hanbali theologian Ibn Taymiyya who was considered by them to be the "ultimate authority on a great number of issues". One of these issues was the position on the visitation of Muhammad's tomb. According to Ibn Taymiyyah all the ahadith encouraging the visitation of the tomb are fabricated (mawdu‘), are not contained in the six main collections of hadith or Musnad Ahmad ibn Hanbal, and violate tawhid al-uluhiya.

This view of Ibn Taymiyya was rejected by some Sunni scholars both during his life and after his death. The Shafi'i hadith master Ibn Hajar al-Asqalani stated that "This is one of the ugliest positions that has been reported of Ibn Taymiyya". The Hanafi hadith scholar Ali al-Qari stated that, "Amongst the Hanbalis, Ibn Taymiyya has gone to an extreme by prohibiting travelling to visit the Prophet – may God bless him and grant him peace" Qastallani stated that "The Shaykh Taqi al-Din Ibn Taymiyya has abominable and odd statements on this issue to the effect that travelling to visit the Prophet is prohibited and is not a pious deed."

==== Shia ====
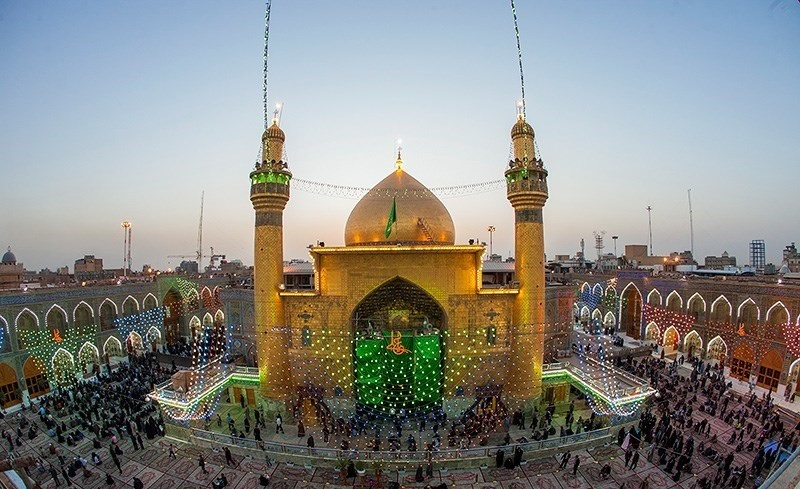
Imam Ali Shrine in Najaf, Iraq

Shias have several mazars dedicated to various religious figures important in their history, and several elaborate shrines (Marqad/Maqam) are dedicated to Shia religious figures, most notably in Iraq (such as in the cities of Karbala, Najaf, Samarra) and in Iran (such as in the cities of Qom and Mashad).

Specific examples of Shia shrines include the Al-Askari Shrine, and Imam Hussein Shrine. Other Shia shrines are located in the eponymous cities of Mazar-e Sharif ("The Noble Mausoleum") in Afghanistan, and Mashhad (al-Rida) ("Martyrium [of Ali al-Rida ]") in Iran. The Mausoleum of Ruhollah Khomeini in Tehran houses the tombs of Ruhollah Khomenei, the leader of Iran's 1978–79 revolution, his wife, and a few other related people.

==== Sufi ====
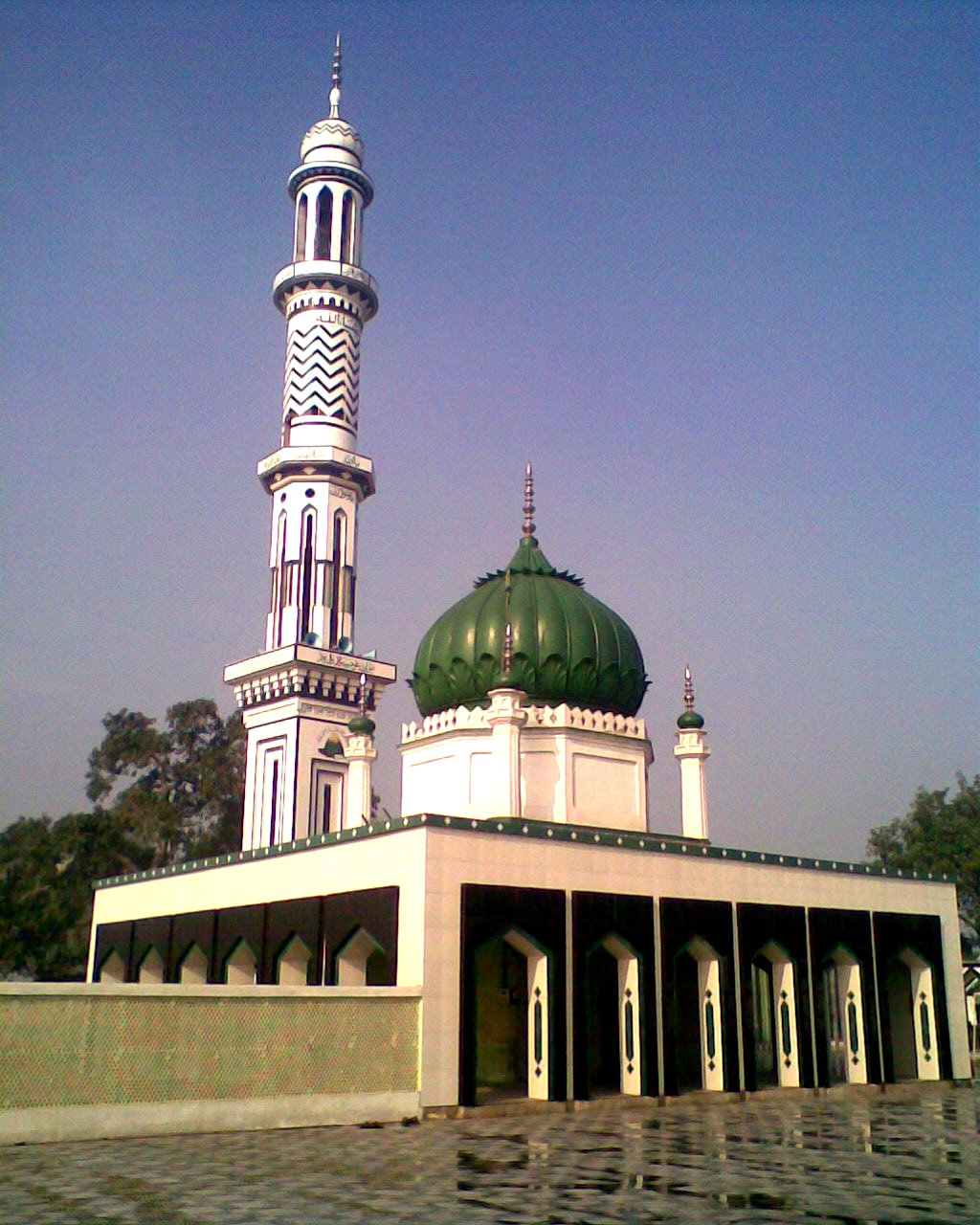
Shrine of Islamic Naqshbandi saints of Allo Mahar Sharif

In popular Sufism, one common practice is to visit or make pilgrimages to the tombs of saints, renowned scholars, and righteous people. This is a particularly common practice in the Indian subcontinent, where famous tombs include of saints such as Sayyid Ali Hamadani in Kulob, Tajikistan; Afāq Khoja, near Kashgar, China; Lal Shahbaz Qalandar in Sindh; Ali Hujwiri in Lahore, Pakistan; Bahauddin Zakariya in Multan Pakistan; Moinuddin Chishti in Ajmer, India; Nizamuddin Auliya in Delhi, India; and Shah Jalal in Sylhet, Bangladesh. Likewise, in Fez, Morocco, a popular destination for pious visitation is the Zaouia Moulay Idriss II. The area around Timbuktu in Mali also has many historic Sufi shrines which were destroyed by Islamist in recent years. Many of these have since been rebuilt. A saint's tomb is a site of great veneration where blessings or baraka continue to reach the deceased holy person and are deemed (by some) to benefit visiting devotees and pilgrims according to Sufi beliefs. In order to show reverence to Sufi saints, kings, and nobles provided large donations or waqf to preserve the tombs and renovate them architecturally. Over time, these donation, rituals, annual commemorations formed into an elaborate system of accepted norms. These forms of Sufi practise created an aura of spiritual and religious traditions around prescribed dates. Many orthodox or Islamic purists denounce these visiting grave rituals, especially the expectation of receiving blessings from the venerated saints.

=== Baháʼí Faith ===
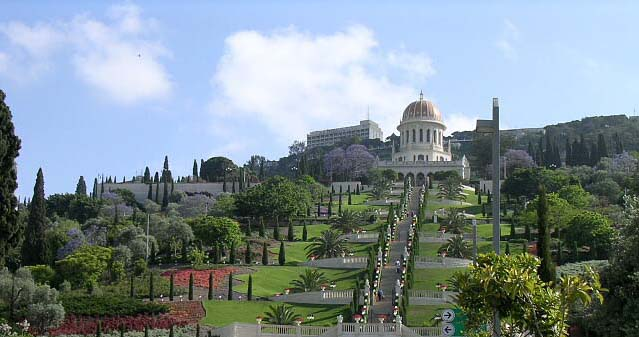
The Shrine of the Báb and its Terraces on Mount Carmel, Haifa.

The two most well-known Baháʼí Faith shrines serve as the resting places for the respective remains of the two central figures of the Baháʼí Faith, the Báb and Bahá'u'lláh. They are the focal points of a Baháʼí pilgrimage:

- The Shrine of the Báb in Haifa, Israel.
- The Shrine of Bahá'u'lláh in Acre, Israel.

Other sites have been designated as Baháʼí Shrines, the most notable being the home of William Sutherland Maxwell and May Maxwell in Montreal, Quebec, Canada.

=== Buddhism ===
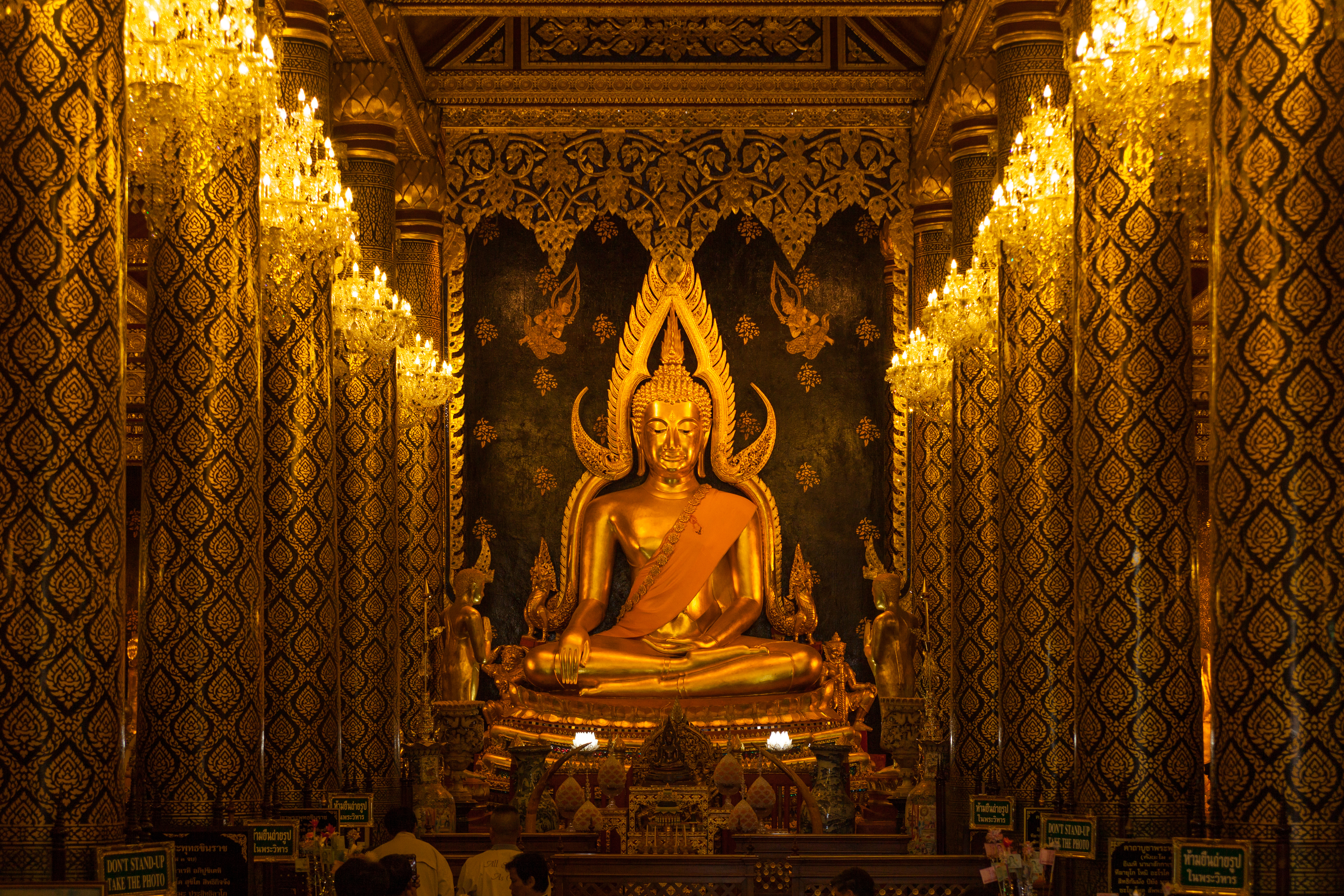
Main Buddhist shrine in Wat Phra Si Rattana Mahathat

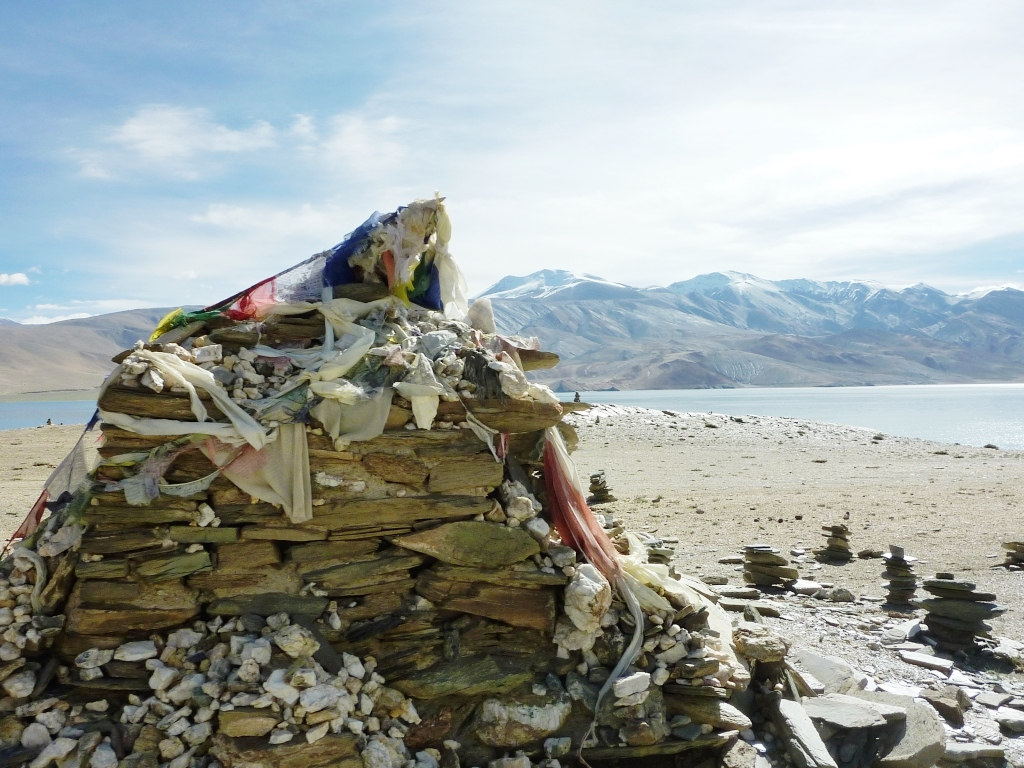
Buddhist shrine On the banks of Tso Moriri, Ladkah, 2010

In Buddhism, a shrine refers to a place where veneration is focused on Lord Buddha or one of the bodhisattvas or arahants. Monks, nuns and laity will pay homage with the aide of Buddhist iconography at these shrines which are also used for Buddhist meditation.

Typically, Buddhist shrines contain a statue of either Gautama Buddha, or (in the Mahayana and Vajrayana forms of Buddhism), one of the various Buddhas or bodhisattvas. They also commonly contain candles, along with offerings such as flowers, purified water, food, and incense. Many shrines also contain sacred relics, such as the famous sacred tooth of Lord Buddha installed at a shrine in Sri Lanka.

Site-specific shrines in Buddhism, particularly those that contain relics of past Buddhas and revered enlightened monks, are often designed in the traditional form known as the Stupa or Cetiya.

=== Philippine folk religions ===
Ancient Filipinos, and Filipinos today who continue to adhere to the indigenous Philippine folk religions generally do not have so-called "temples" of worship under the context known to foreign cultures. However, they do have sacred shrines, which are also called as spirit houses. They can range in size from small roofed platforms, to structures similar to a small house (but with no walls), to shrines that look similar to pagodas, especially in the south where early mosques were also modeled in the same way. These shrines were known in various indigenous terms, which depend on the ethnic group association. (Note: Known as magdantang in Visayan and ulango or simbahan in Tagalog. Among the Itneg, shrines are known tangpap, pangkew, or alalot (for various small roofed altars); and balaua or kalangan (for larger structures). In Mindanao, shrines are known among the Subanen as maligai; among the Teduray as tenin (only entered by shamans); and among the Bagobo as buis (for those built near roads and villages) and parabunnian (for those built near rice fields).(Kroeber, 1918)) They can also be used as places to store taotao and caskets of ancestors. Among Bicolanos, taotao were also kept inside sacred caves called moog.

During certain ceremonies, anito are venerated through temporary altars near sacred places. These were called latangan or lantayan in Visayan and dambana or lambana in Tagalog. (Note: Also saloko or palaan (Itneg); sakolong (Bontoc); salagnat (Bicolano); sirayangsang (Tagbanwa); ranga (Teduray); and tambara, tigyama, or balekat (Bagobo)) These bamboo or rattan altars are identical in basic construction throughout most of the Philippines. They were either small roof-less platforms or standing poles split at the tip (similar to a tiki torch). They held halved coconut shells, metal plates, or martaban jars as receptacles for offerings. Taotao may sometimes also be placed on these platforms.

Other types of sacred places or objects of worship of diwata include the material manifestation of their realms. The most widely venerated were balete trees (also called nonok, nunuk, nonoc, etc.) and anthills or termite mounds (punso). Other examples include mountains, waterfalls, tree groves, reefs, and caves.

=== Germanic paganism ===
In Germanic paganism, types of shrines were employed, but terms for the shrines show some level of ambiguity:

- Hörgrs, which may have originally exclusively referred to "holy places", whereas its Old English cognate hearg could mean "holy grove" and/or "temple, idol"
- Vés (Old Norse) or wēohs (Old English), referring to either a types of shrines or sacred enclosures. The term appears in skaldic poetry and in place names in Scandinavia (with the exception of Iceland), often in connection with a Norse deity or a geographic feature. The name of the Norse god Vé, refers to the practice.

=== Hinduism ===
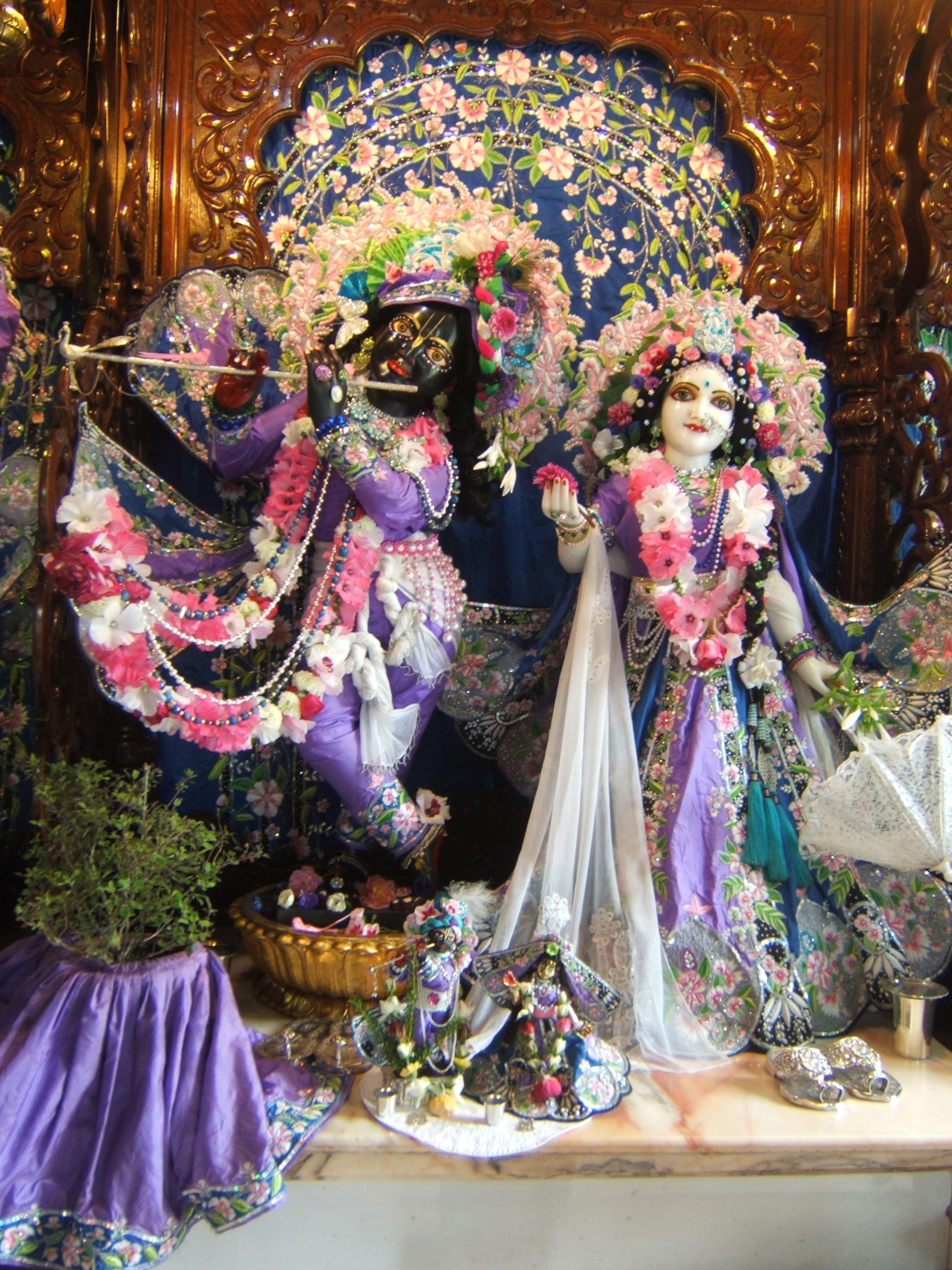
A temple shrine for Radha Krishna

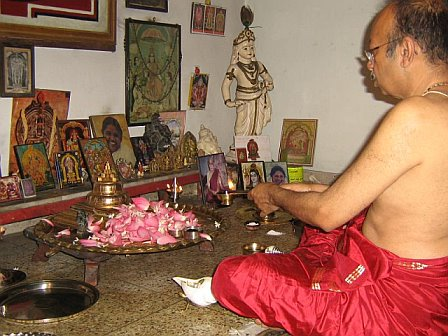
A household shrine.

In Hinduism, a shrine is a place where gods or goddesses are worshipped. Shrines are typically located inside a Hindu temple of various forms. Most Hindu families have a household shrine as well. For example, according to memoirs of Stephen Huyler of his visits to some Hindu homes, a part of home was dedicated to the household shrine. Here, image of a deity was placed and offered prayers, instead of visits to a temple. Among Tamil Hindu homes, according to Pintchman, a shrine in Kitchen is more common. If the family is wealthy, it may locate the household shrine in a separate room.

=== Taoism ===
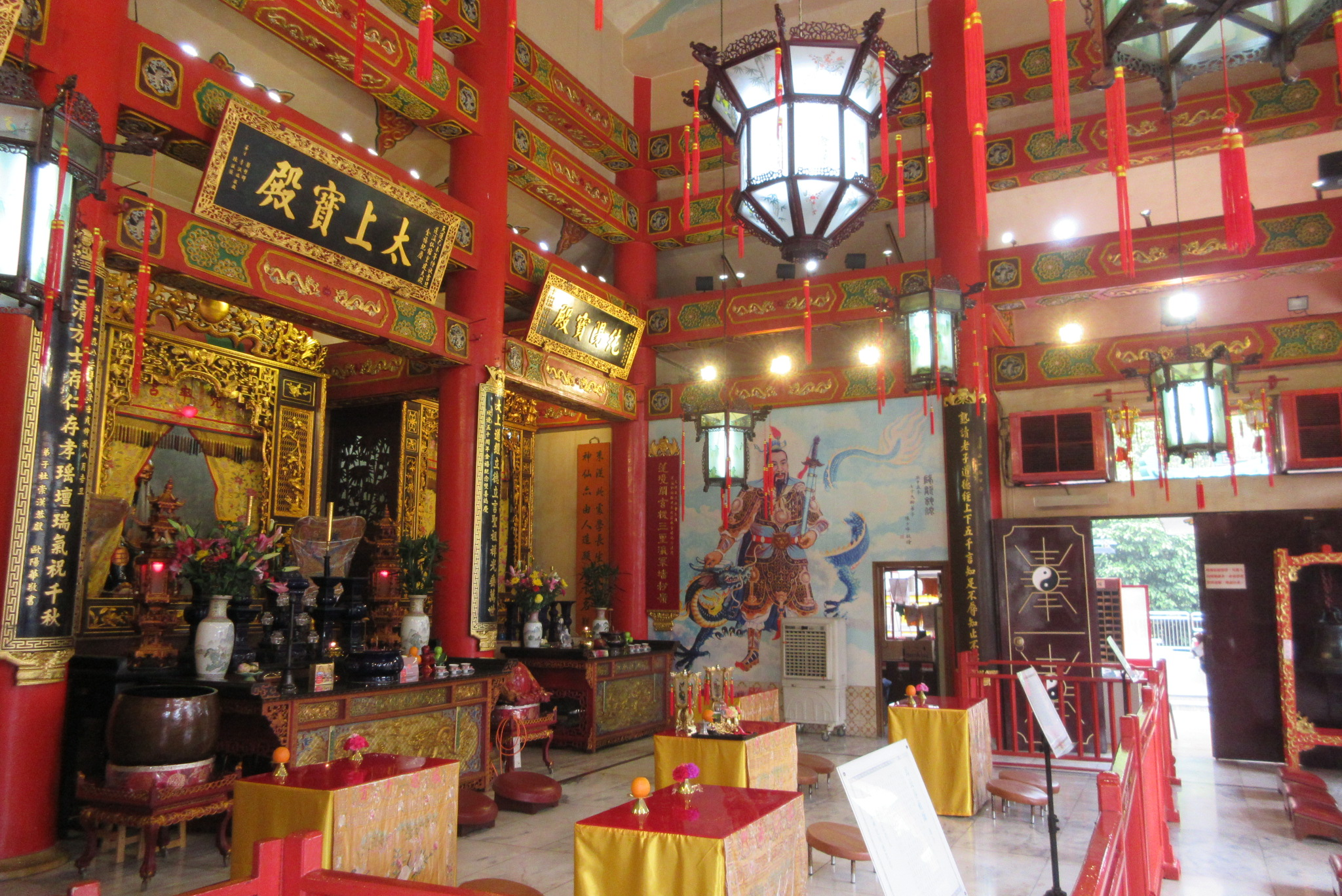
Shrine hall inside Taoist Temple, Fung Ying Seen Koon in Hong Kong

The line between a temple and a shrine in Taoism is not fully defined; shrines are usually smaller versions of larger Taoist temples or small places in a home where a yin-yang emblem is placed among peaceful settings to encourage meditation and study of Taoist texts and principles. Taoists place less emphasis on formalized attendance but include ritualized worship than other Asian religions; formal temples and structures of worship came about in Taoism with the influence from Buddhism.

Frequent features of Taoist shrines include the same features as full temples, often including any or all of the following features: gardens, running water or fountains, small burning braziers or candles (with or without incense), and copies of Taoist texts such as the Tao Te Ching, Zhuangzi or other texts by Lao Tzu, Chuang Tzu or other Taoist sages.

=== Confucianism ===
A number of Confucian temples and shrines exist across the sinophone world, it is a temple for the veneration of Confucius, great sages, eminent philosophers of Confucianism and also the Disciples of Confucius. These temples are known as "Temples of Confucius" (孔廟) or "Temples of Literature" (文廟). Unlike Taoist temples, Confucian temples usually do not install images of Confucius, but of the tablets. It is argued that the temple was to honour Confucius's teachings, not Confucius himself. The temples consist of gardens and a large pavilion where incense is burnt. The tablet or sometimes an image of Confucius is usually placed in the main shrine.

Confucian shrines exist outside of China too, mainly in Japan, Korea and Vietnam. There are quite a number of Confucian shrines in Taiwan like Tainan Confucian Temple and Taipei Confucius Temple, and they are well-maintained by the government. However, many Taoist temples also dedicate a shrine for the worship of Confucius or Wen Chang Di Jun (God of Literature).

== Secular shrines ==
In some countries around the world, landmarks may be called "historic shrines." Notable shrines of this type include:

- The Alamo in San Antonio, Texas, U.S.
- Fort McHenry in Baltimore, Maryland, U.S.
- Touro Synagogue in Newport, Rhode Island, U.S.
- Shrine of Remembrance, a war memorial in Melbourne, Australia
- Shrine of Remembrance, a war memorial in Brisbane, Australia
- Lenin's Mausoleum in Moscow, Russia
- Kumsusan Palace of the Sun in Pyongyang, North Korea

Halls of fame also serve as shrines into which single or multiple individuals are inducted on the basis of their influence upon regions, cultures or disciplines. Busts or full-body statues are often erected and placed alongside each other in commemoration. This includes Halls of Fame that honor sports athletes, where an athlete's entrance to the hall is commonly described as "enshrinement".

By extension the term shrine has come to mean any place dedicated completely to a particular person or subject such as the Shrine of the Sun in Colorado Springs, Colorado.

== See also ==
- Wayside shrine
- Australian Aboriginal sacred sites
- Earth mysteries
- Holiest sites in Islam (Shia)
- Holiest sites in Islam (Sunni)
- Indigenous Philippine shrines and sacred grounds
- List of shrines
- Numen
- Makeshift/roadside memorial
- Sacred natural site
- Sanctuary
- Shrines to the Virgin Mary
- Shriners or the Ancient Arabic Order of the Nobles of the Mystic Shrine
- Shinto shrine
