= Mazar (mausoleum) =

Venerated structure in traditional Islam

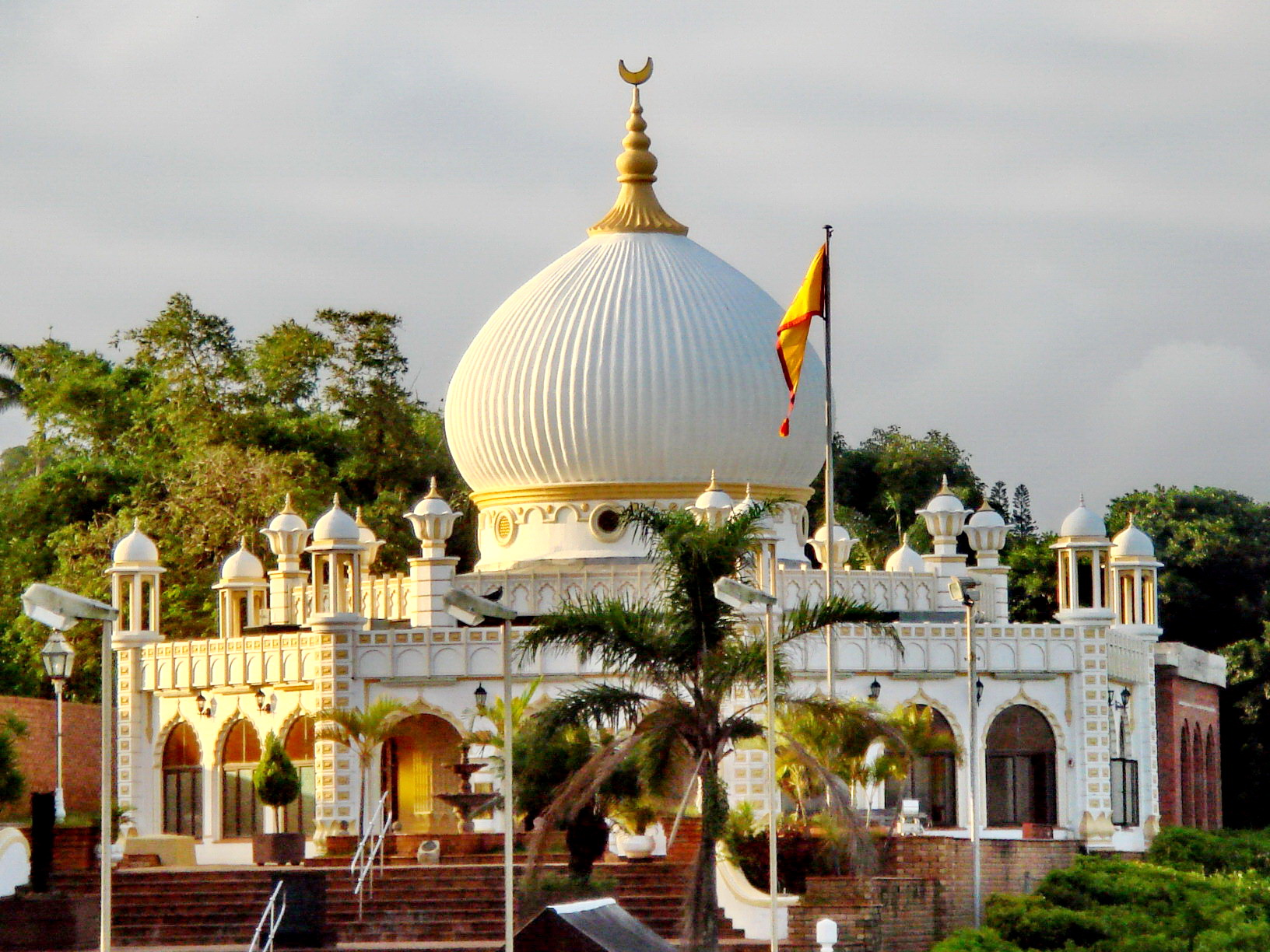
The Holy Shrine of Hazrat Soofie Saheb in Durban, South Africa

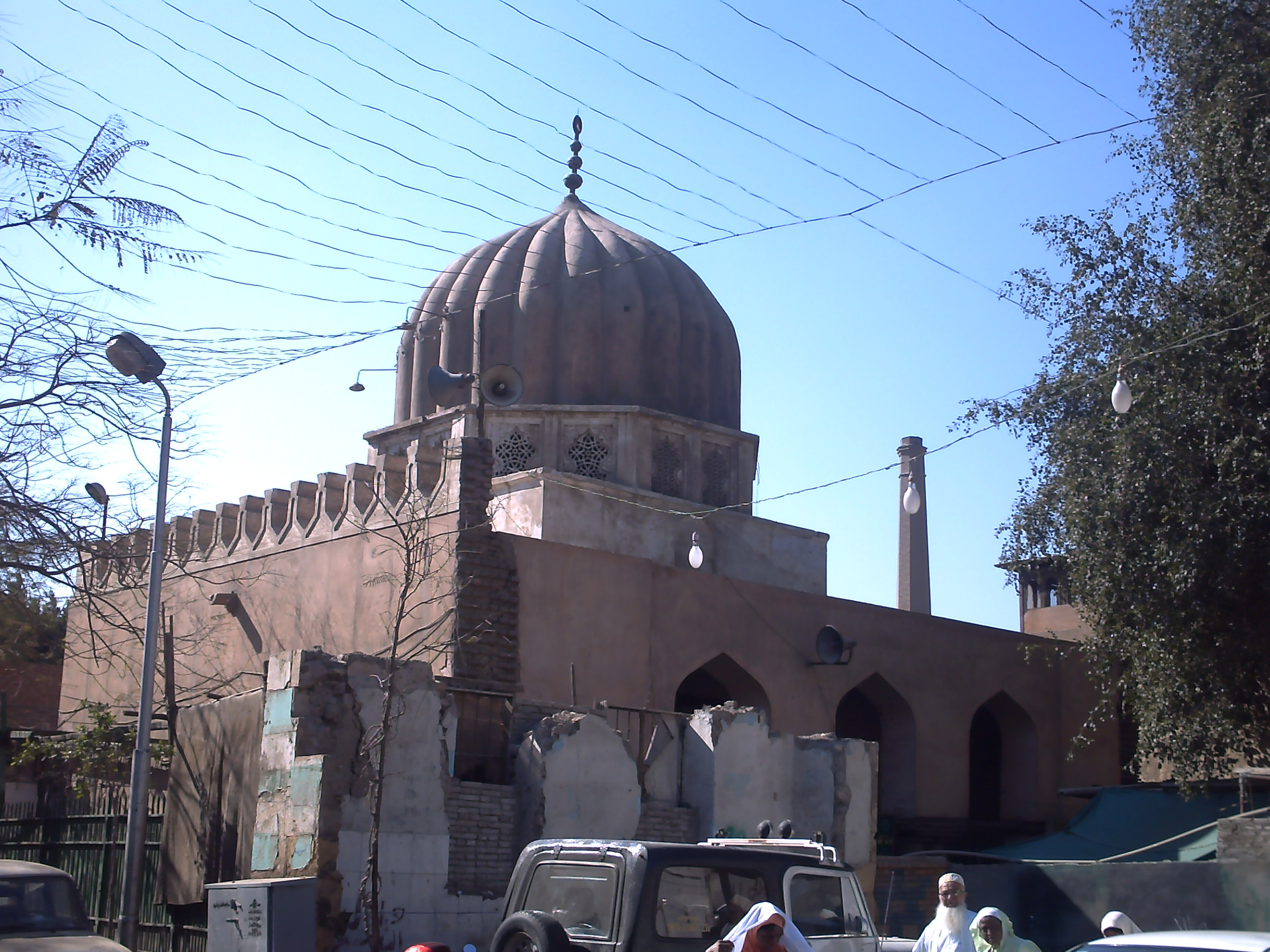
The Mashhad of Sayyida Ruqayya, a patron saint of Cairo. The shrine of Pir Hadi Hassan Bux Shah Jilani, Duthro Sharif, Pakistan

A mazār (Arabic: مَزَار), also transliterated as mazaar, also known as marqad (مَرْقَد) or in the Maghreb as ḍarīḥ (ضَرِيْح), or in Cape Town as a kramat, is a mausoleum, tomb or shrine all around the world, typically that of a saint or notable religious leader. Medieval Arabic texts may also use the words mašhad (مَشْهَد) or maqām to denote the same concept.

== Etymology ==
- Mazār, plural mazārāt (مَزَارَات), is related to the word ziyāra (زيارة, meaning "visitation"). It refers to a place and time of visiting. Arabic in origin, the word has been borrowed by Persian, Hindi-Urdu, Punjabi and Bengali. It has also been rendered as mazaar in English.
- Ḍarīḥ, plural aḍriḥa (أضرحة) or ḍarāiḥ (ضرائح), is related to the verb ḍaraḥa (ضَرَحَ meaning "to inter"). It is commonly used in the Maghreb.
- Kramat, plural kramats (كرامات), is a word commonly used among the people of Cape Town to refer to a holy shrine and burial site of a saint.
- Mašhad, plural mašāhid (مشاهد), is related to the word šahīd (شهيد, meaning "martyr"). It refers to the resting place of a martyr who gave their life for the cause of God.

== Specific types of shrines ==
- Mashhad usually refers to a structure holding the tomb of a holy figure, or a place where a religious visitation occurred. (Note: The city of Mashhad in Iran takes its name from the sense of mashhad meaning "place of martyrdom". It is the place where the eighth Imam Ali Al-Ridha was martyred.) A mashhad often had a dome over the place of the burial within the building. Some had a minaret.
- Maqām, plural maqāmāt, literally "station", referring to where one stays or resides, is often used for Ahl al-Bayt shrines. According to Ibn Taymiyya, the maqāmāt are the places where the revered person lived, died or worshiped, and the mašāhidd are buildings over the maqāmāt or over relics of the person.

== Regional terms for equivalent structures ==
- Mazār is the Arabic word borrowed by Persian, Urdu-Hindi, Punjabi and Bengali. It is thus largely used in Iran and other Islamic countries influenced by Persian culture, in Afghanistan, Pakistan, India, Nepal and Bangladesh.
- Weli (plural awliya): in Palestine, weli is the common term both for a saint and his sanctuary. A prophet's weli is called a hadrah, a common saint's is a maqam and a famous saint has a mashhad. 19th- to early 20th-century Western literature has adopted the word "wali", sometimes written "weli", "welli", etc., with the meaning of a "tomb or mausoleum of a holy man".
- Qubba (lit. "dome", plural qubbat): in Sudan, the tomb of a holy man. Sudanese folk Islam holds that the holy man is sharing his baraka or blessings also after death through his grave, which is the repository for his baraka and thus becomes a place of ziyara ziyarat or visitation. A holy man worthy of such a shrine is called in Sudan a wali, faki, or shaykh.
- In northwestern China, mazār is also translated phonetically as mázhā (麻扎). It is also often referred to as a gǒngběi (拱北), derived from the Persian word gunbad, meaning "dome". It is often a shrine complex centered on a grave of a Sufi master of the Hui people.
- In Iran and in the Indian subcontinent, a dargāh is a Sufi Islamic shrine built over the grave of a revered religious figure.
- In South Africa (especially the Western Cape), a kramat is the grave of a spiritual leader or auliya, sometimes inside a rectangular building that functions also as a shrine for the deceased (often a Cape Malay).
- In Java, the terms makam and kuburan refer to graves of early missionaries, notably the Wali Sanga. In the Malay cultural regions of the Riau Archipelago, Singapore and the Malay Peninsula, keramat refers to an object or person believed to be sacred or blessed, for example the tomb of a Muslim saint (see also Datuk Keramat).

== Related terms ==
- Masjid, plural masājid, means a place of prostration or prayer, and is often used by Shi'a for shrines to which mosques have been attached.
- Ḍarīḥ, plural aḍriḥa, is a trench in the middle of the grave, or the grave itself.

== Origins ==
Practices vary considerably in different countries. Syncretism is not unusual, where pre-Islamic practices and beliefs persist among Muslim communities. A cult of saints developed within some Muslim communities at an early date, following deeply ingrained pre-Islamic practices in the Middle East. Mashhads, or sanctuaries, were established by certain people for figures mentioned from the Quran, such as Muhammad, Jesus, the prophets, and other main figures of the Jewish and Christian Bible, great rulers, military leaders and clerics.

== Opponents ==
The followers of Wahhabism consider that no person can mediate between man and God. They consider that Muslims who believe that saints and their shrines have holy properties are polytheists and heretics. In 1802, Wahhabi forces partially destroyed the shrine of Imam Husayn. In 1925, the commander and later-king of Saudi Arabia, Abdulaziz Ibn Saud, destroyed the manmade structures in Jannat al-Baqīʿ in Medina, the burial place of four of the Shia imams and of Muhammad's daughter. The cemetery still exists, albeit in a much simpler form, and is used to bury the dead.

== Design ==
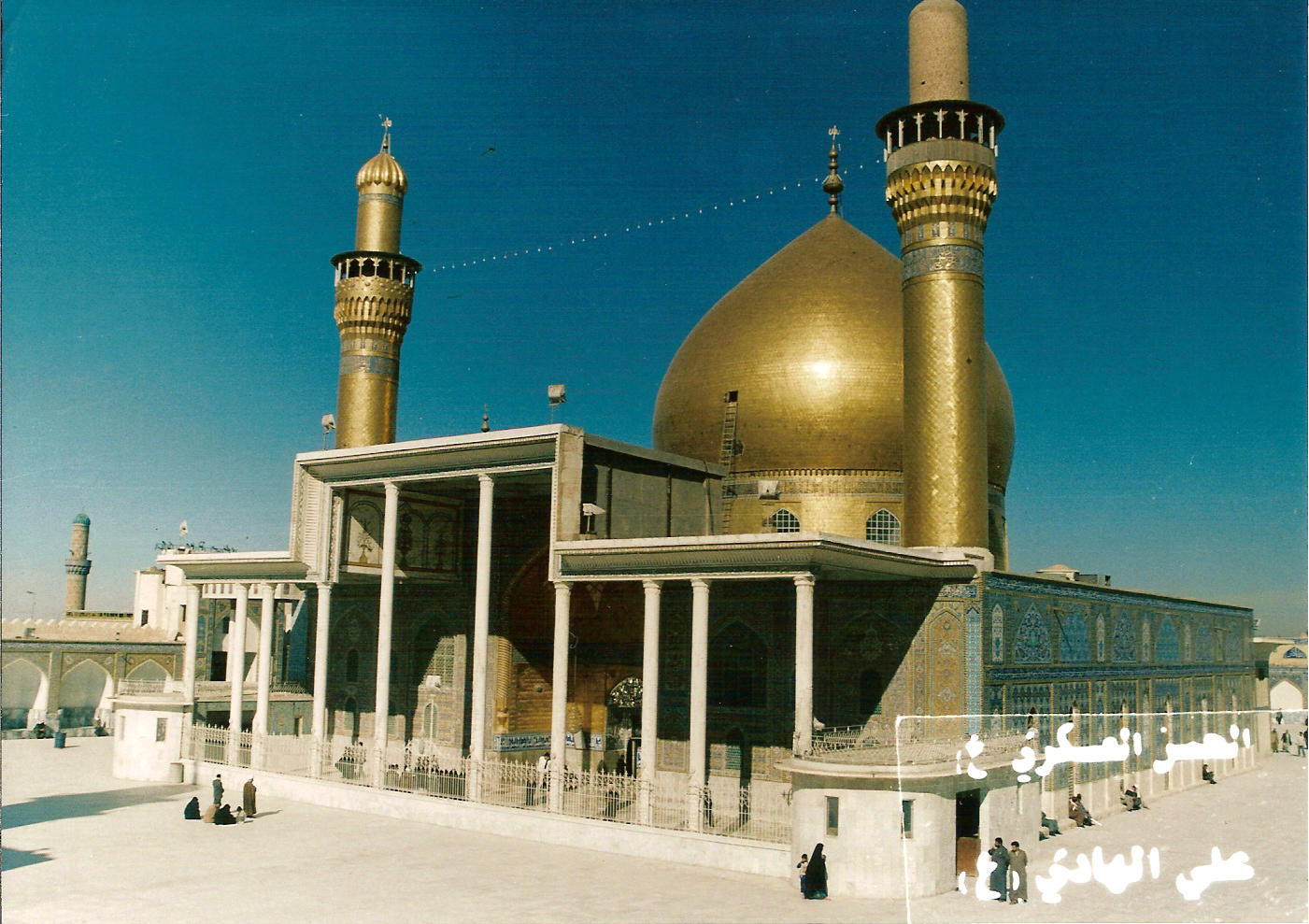
Al-Askari Shrine in Samarra before the 2006 bombing.

There is no specific architectural type for mazārs, which vary greatly in size and elaboration. However, they all follow the conventional design of the turba, or tomb, and generally have a dome over a rectangular base.

== Notable examples ==
=== In Iraq ===
The Imam Husayn Shrine in Karbala, Iraq draws Shia pilgrims from Iraq, Iran and elsewhere.

The Sirdāb of Caliph al-Mahdi (r. 775–785) is preserved in Samarra, Iraq under a golden dome that was presented by Naser al-Din Shah Qajar and that was completed by Mozaffar ad-Din Shah Qajar in 1905. The tomb lies within the Al-Askari Shrine, one of the most important of Shia shrines. The mosque was badly damaged in a February 2006 bombing, presumably the work of Sunni militants.

=== In Iran ===
As of 2007, the Imam Reza shrine in Mashhad, Iran attracted 12 million visitors annually, second only to Mecca as a destination for Muslim pilgrims. This shrine is known for its healing powers.

The shrine of Princess Shahrbanu, just south of Tehran, is open only to women. Shahrbanu was the daughter of Yazdegerd III, the last Sassanid ruler of Persia. She married Imam Hussein ibn Ali and was mother of the fourth Shia imam, Ali ibn al-Husayn, so has come to symbolize the early and close connection between Shi'ism and Iran. The shrine is popular with women seeking solace or assistance.

=== In Syria ===
The Sayyidah Zaynab Mosque is Damascus, the shrine of Zaynab bint Ali in Damascus, has been restored with the help of contributions from Shi'as from India, Pakistan, Iran and elsewhere. The shrine is one of the most important Shia sites in Syria, and draws many pilgrims from Iraq, Lebanon, and Iran. In September 2008 a car bomb was detonated outside the shrine, killing 17.

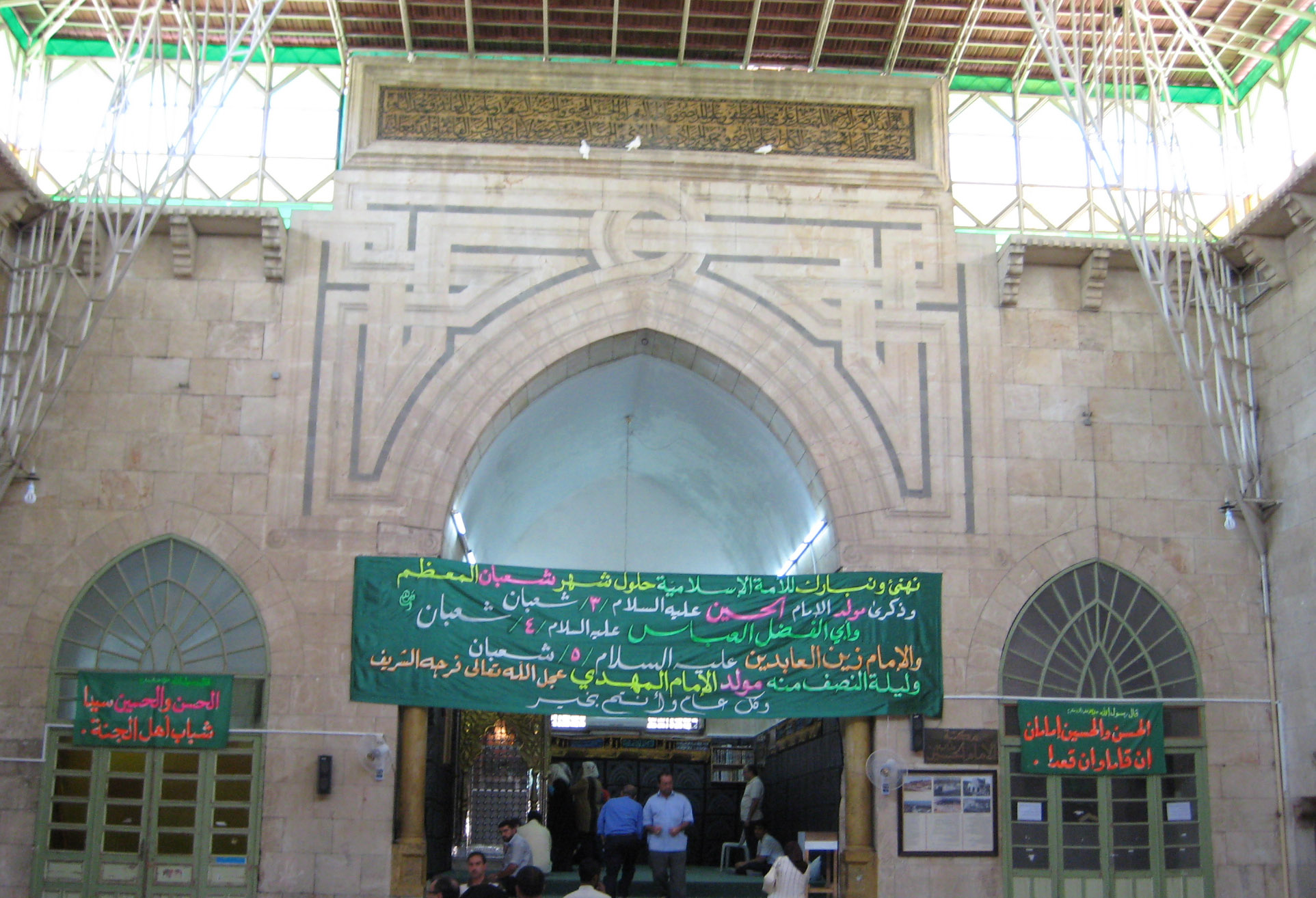
Mashhad al-Husayn in Aleppo, restored and with steel-frame roof added.

In Aleppo, the Mashhad al-Husayn from the Ayyubid period is the most important of Syrian medieval buildings. The shrine of al-Husayn was built on a place indicated to a shepherd by a holy man who appeared to him in a dream, and was built by members of the local Shia community. The present building is a reconstruction: the original suffered severe damage in 1918 from a huge explosion, and for forty years lay in ruins. The original restoration largely succeeded in restoring the mashhad to its former appearance. Later additions included covering the courtyard with a steel frame canopy and adding a brightly decorated shrine, which have given the monument a very different character from the original.

=== In Egypt ===
In Egypt, many mashhads devoted to religious figures were built in Fatimid Cairo, mostly straightforward square structures with a dome. A few of the mausoleums at Aswan were more complex and included side rooms. Most of the Fatimid mausoleums have either been destroyed or have been greatly altered through later renovations. The Mashad al-Juyushi (also called Mashad Badr al-Jamali), is an exception. This building has a prayer hall covered with groin vaults, with a dome resting on squinches over the area in front of the mihrab. It has a courtyard with a tall square minaret. It is not clear whom the mashhad commemorates.

Two other important mashhads from the Fatimid era in Cairo are those of Sayyida Ruqayya and of Yayha al-Shabib, in the Fustat cemetery. Sayyida Ruqayya bint Husayn, a descendant of Ali, never visited Egypt, but the mashhad was built to commemorate her. It is similar to al-Juyushi, but with a larger, fluted dome and with an elegantly decorated mihrab.

=== In Pakistan ===
Some shrines draw both Sunni and Shia pilgrims. One example is the shrine of Abd al-Ghazi Sahib in Karachi, said to be a relative of Ja'far al-Sadiq, the sixth imam. He had fled from the Abbasids in Baghdad to Sindh, where he was given refuge by a Hindu prince. The Shias venerate him as a member of the family of imams, while the Sunni simply see him as a person of great sanctity.

Another example is the Lahore shrine of Bibi Pak Daman, thought to be the place of burial of one of Ali's daughters and four other women of Muhammad's family. The famous Sufi saint of the Sunni branch of Islam, Sayyid Ali Hujwiri (died 1071), once meditated for forty days in this shrine.

=== In Uzbekistan ===
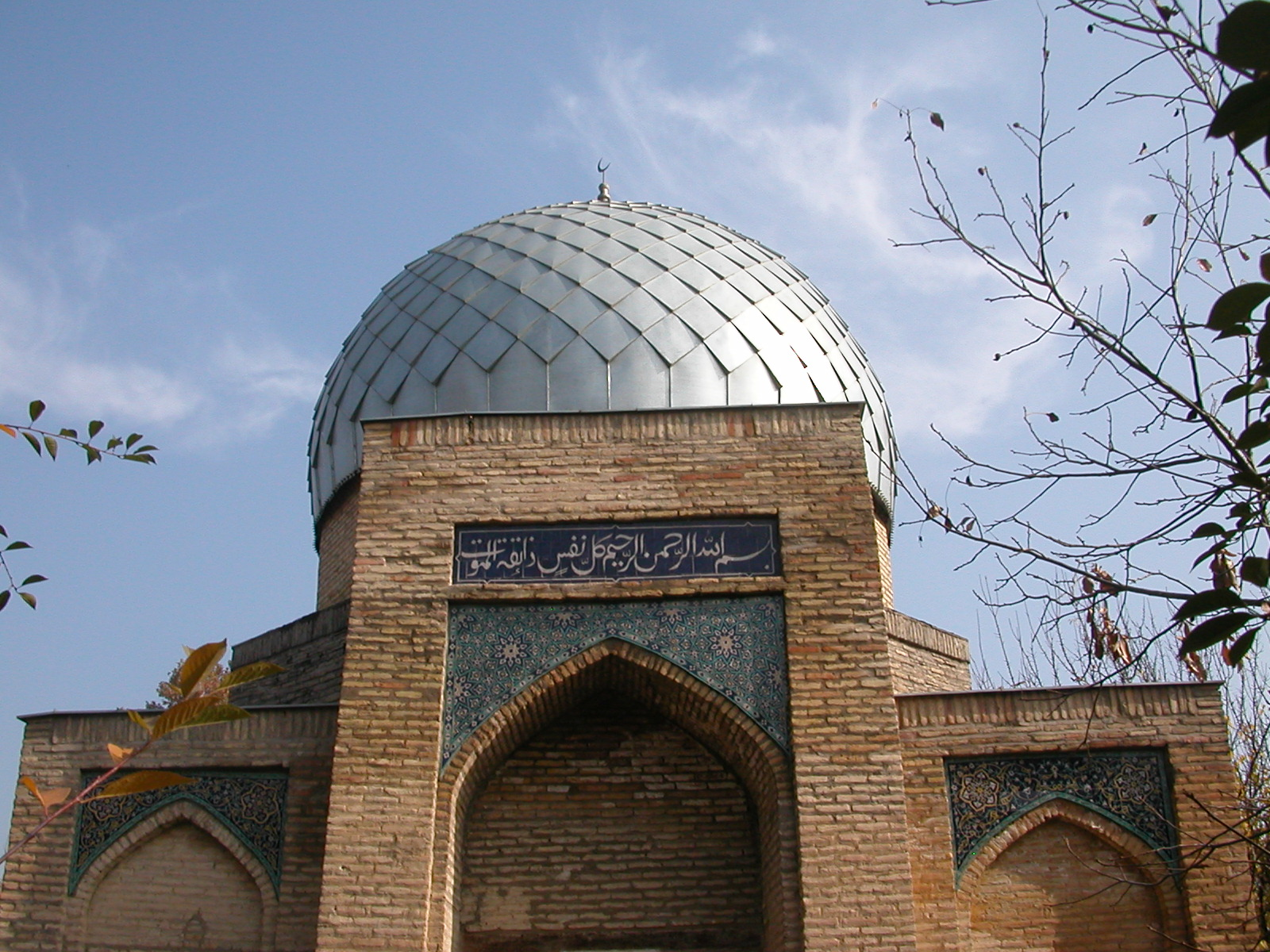
Mausoleum of Sheihantaur in Tashkent, Uzbekistan

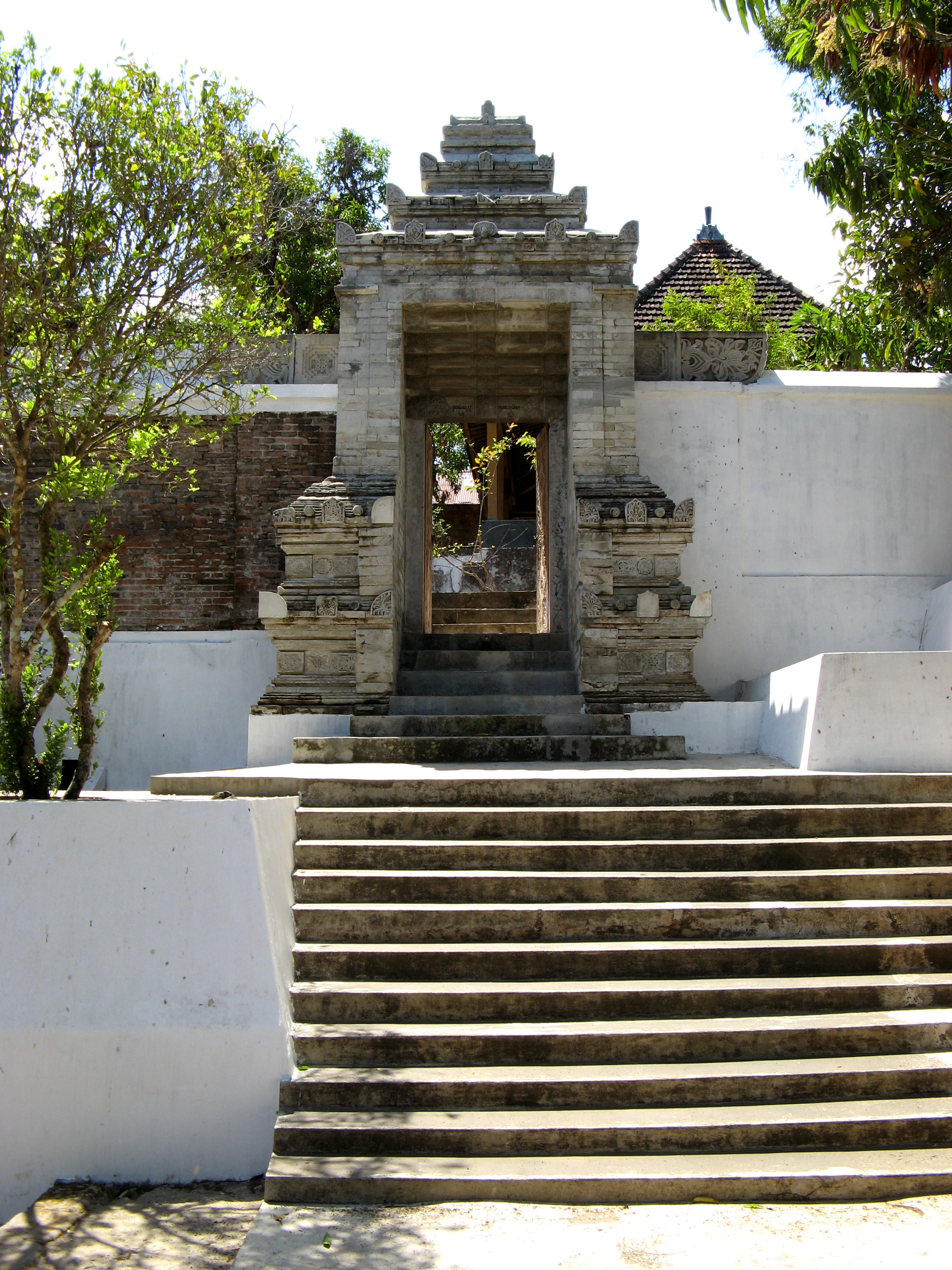
Imogiri Mausoleum complex of the sultans of Java, Indonesia

- Mausoleum of Sheihantaur in Tashkent, Uzbekistan

=== In United States of America ===
- Bawa Muhaiyaddeen
- Shaykh Abdallah al-Fa'iz ad-Daghestani
- Mawlana Shaykh Muhammad Nazim al-Haqqani
- Hajjah Amina Adil
- Mawlana Shaykh Muhammad Hisham Kabbani

=== In United Kingdom ===
- Hazrat Sufi Abdullah Khan
- Pir Abdul Wahab Siqqidue

=== In Kyrgyzstan ===
- Manas Ordo Mausoleum of Manas in Talas Province, Kyrgyzstan

=== In Afghanistan ===
- Kirka Sharif in Kandahar, Afghanistan. It contains a cloak believed to have been worn by Muhammad.
- Mausolem of Imam Ali in Mazar-i-Sharif, Afghanistan. One of the reputed burial places of Ali.

=== In China ===
- Afaq Khoja Mausoleum near Kashgar in Xinjiang, China, tomb of Muhammad Yūsuf and his son Afaq Khoja
- Sultan Satuq Bughra Khan Mausoleum in Artush
- Ordam Padishah shrine near Kashgar
- Imam Asim Khan Mausoleum

=== In Egypt ===
- Aga Khan III Mausoleum in Aswan
- Abu Al Hassan El-Shazly Mausoleum in Sheikh Shazly

=== In Sudan ===
- Mausoleum of the Mahdi in Omdurman
- Mausoleum of Sheikh Hassan al-Nil in Omdurman

=== In Pakistan ===
- Shrine of Data Ganj Baksh near Bhati Gate, in Lahore's Walled City, Pakistan.
- Mazar-e-Quaid, tomb of the founder of Pakistan, Muhammad Ali Jinnah, in Karachi, Pakistan.
- Mazar of Sultan Bahu, the founder of Sarwari Qadri order in Garh Maharaja, in Lahore, Pakistan.

=== In India ===
- Dargah Nizamuddin, founder of Chisti Nizami order, in Delhi, India.
- Laila Majnu Ki Mazar, near Anupgarh, Rajasthan, India. According to local legend, the couple Layla and Majnun died here.
- Mausoleum of Syedi Fakhruddin Shahid in Galiakot, Rajasthan, India.

=== In Bangladesh ===
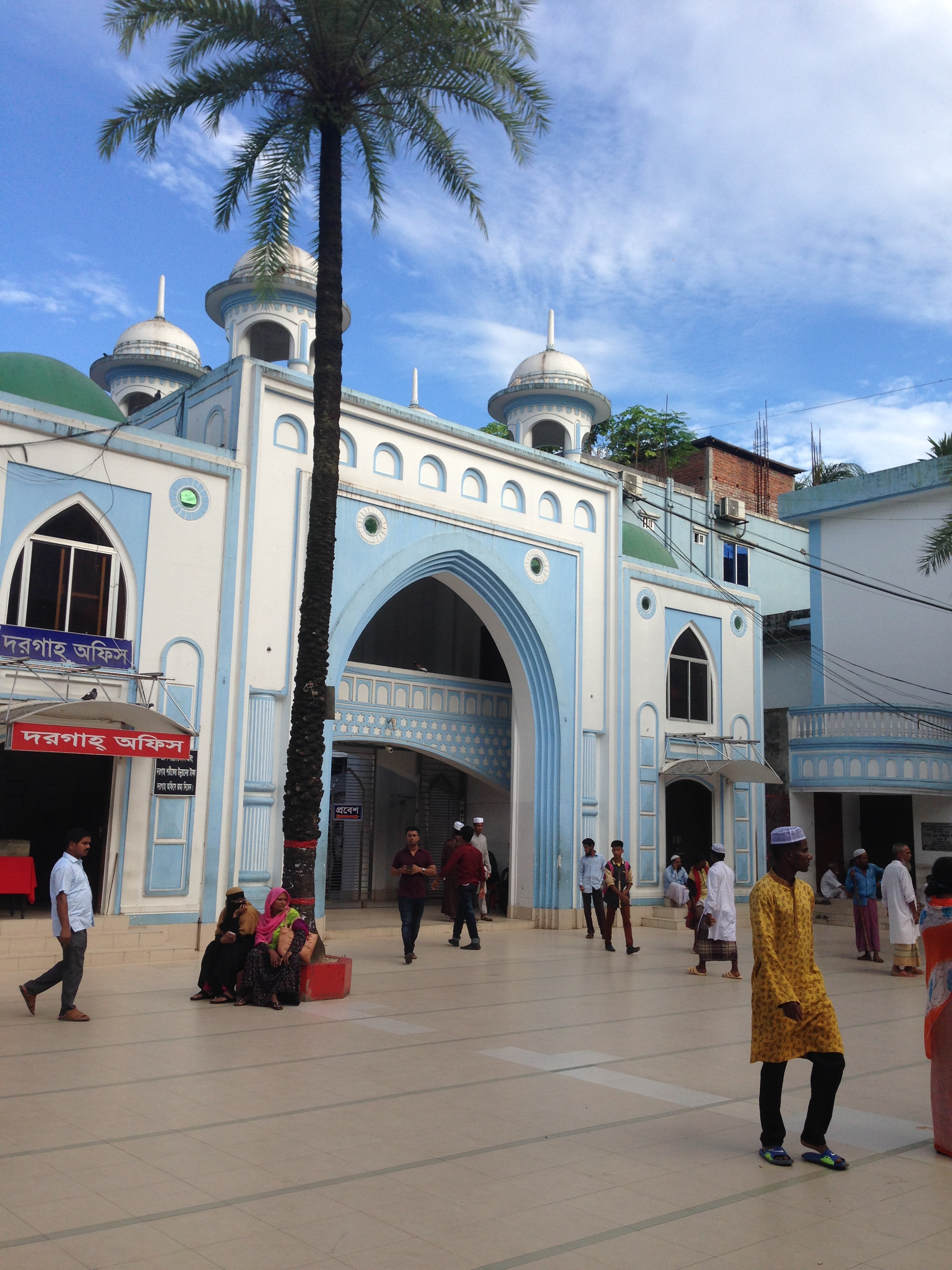
Shrine of Shah Jalal in Sylhet, Bangladesh

- Shrine of Bayazid Bostami in Chittagong, Bangladesh
- Shrine of Shaiykh Saiyed Razzaq Ali Gilani in A. K. Khan, Chittagong, Bangladesh.
- Shrine of Shah Jalal in Sylhet, Bangladesh.

=== In Indonesia ===
- Imogiri in Java, mausoleum complex of the sultans of Mataram, Yogyakarta and Surakarta.

=== In Singapore ===
- Keramat Iskandar Syah, at Fort Canning Hill, is believed to be the tomb of Raja Iskandar Shah a 14-century king of Singapore.

=== In South Africa ===
- Hazrat Soofie Saheb
- Hazrat Ahmed Badshah Peer
- Hazrat Soofie Bhaijaan
- Hazrat Goolam Rasool Bawa
- Hazrat Raja Bawa
- Hazrat Qamar Ali Shah Khaki
- Hazrat Sheik Yusuf
- Hazrat Jabileel Jaffer
- Hazrat Khalid Shah Bawa
- Imam Bapu Bare Mia
- Hazrat Soofie Sayed Mohamed Abed Mia Osmani
- Hazrat Chote Bawa Saheb
- Hazrat Hajee Ghulam Mustafa Bawa
- Hazrat Pochee Bawa
- Hazrat Hajee Abdus Sattar
- Hazrat Sayya Bawa
- Hazrat Qasim Bawa
- Sayed Abduraghman Motura
- Sayed Bin Yamien
- Sheikh Yusuf Al Makkasari
- Sheikh Abdul Rahman
- The 4 As-habat companions of Sheikh Yusuf
- Tuan Dea Koasa
- Tuan Ismail Dea Malela
- Imam Abdul Karim
- Sheikh Abdurahman Matebe Shah
- Sayed Mahmud
- Sheikh Abdul Mutalib
- Sheikh Noorul Mubeen
- Sayed Jaffer
- Sayed Alie
- Sheikh Muhammad Zaid
- Sheikh Ali Sayed Basseir
- Sheikh Mohamed Hassen Ghaibie Shah
- Tuan Nur Ghiri Bawa
- Tuan Sayed Sulaiman
- Tuan Sayed Osman
- Tuan Kaape-Ti-Low
- Tuan Guru
- Tuan Sayed Alawie
- Tuan Nuruman
- Sayed Abdul Malik
- Sayed Abdul Haq al-Qadiri
- Sayed Jabaar
- Sayed Muhammad Haq al-Qadiri
- Sayed Muhammad
- Sayed Mohammed Illahie
- Sayed Moegsin bin Alawie al-Aidarus
- Sheikh Abdurahman Ibn Muhammad al-Iraqi
- Sheikh Abdul Kader Bismillah Shah Bawa
- Sheikh Muhammad Sallie
- Moulana Abdul Latief Qadi Siddique
- Hazrat Khwaja Sayed Mehboob Ali Shah Chishti Nizami
- Tuan Masud
- Sayed Nasser
- Sayed Abdul Kader
- Sheikh Suleiman
- Sayed Abdurrahman

== See also ==
- Datuk Keramat
- Dargah
- Early medieval domes
- Khanqah
- Maqam
- Maqbara
- Marabout
- Na Tuk Kong
- Rauza
