= Dargah =

Sufi grave shrine

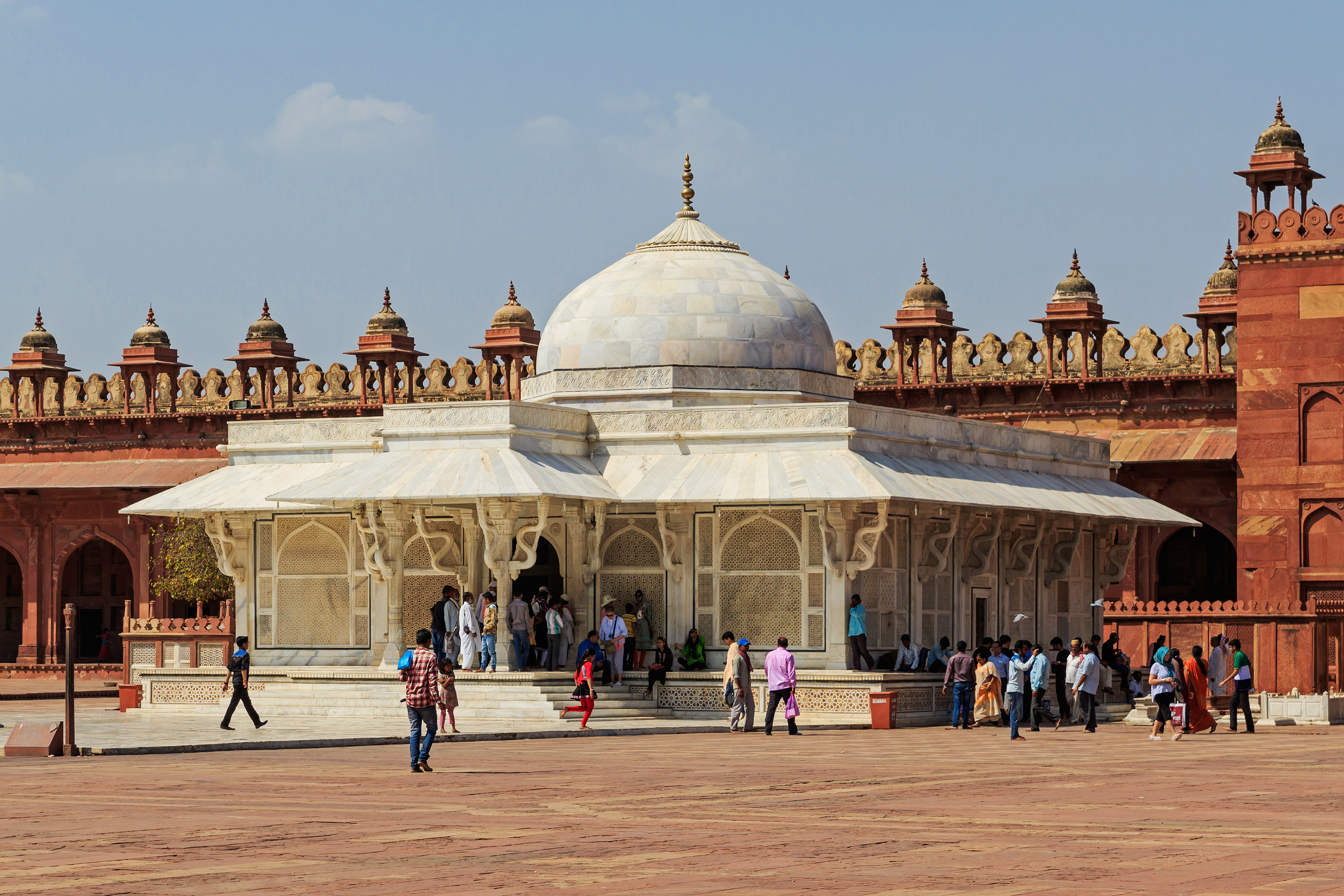
The Tomb of Salim Chishti at Fatehpur Sikri, India was built in 1581 during the reign of Mughal Emperor Akbar.

A Sufi shrine or dargah (Note: Persian: درگاه, romanized: dargâh or درگه (dargah); Turkish: dergâh; Hindustani: दरगाह or درگاہ (dargāh); Bengali: দরগাহ, romanized: dôrgah; Chinese: 拱北, romanized: Gongbei.) is a shrine or tomb built over the grave of a revered religious figure, often a Sufi saint or dervish. Sufis often visit the shrine for ziyarat, a term associated with religious visitation and pilgrimages. Dargahs are often associated with Sufi eating and meeting rooms and hostels, called khanqah or hospices. They usually include a mosque, meeting rooms, Islamic religious schools (madrasas), residences for a teacher or caretaker, hospitals, and other buildings for community purposes.

== Etymology and other terms ==
The term dargah (dargāh; literally "doorway" or "threshold") originates from Persian compound roots dar (در) , meaning "door," and gāh (گاه), meaning "place." Historically, this term was used for the royal court and then in Persian literature for the court of a holy person.

Sufi shrines are found in many Muslim communities throughout the world and are called by many names. The term dargah is common in the Persian-influenced Islamic world, notably in Iran, Turkey and South Asia.

In South Africa, the term is used to describe shrines in the Durban area where there is a strong Indian presence, while the term kramat is more commonly used in Cape Town, where there is a strong Cape Malay culture.

In China, the term gongbei is usually used for shrine complexes centered around a Sufi saint's tomb.

== Significance ==
Some Sufi and other Muslims believe that dargahs are portals by which they can invoke the deceased saint's intercession and blessing, as per tawassul, also known as dawat-e qaboor دعوتِ قبور, "invocations of the graves or tombs" or ‘ilm-e dawat عِلمِ دعوت, "knowledge of invocations". Still others hold a less important view of dargahs, and simply visit as a means of paying their respects to deceased pious individuals or to pray at the sites for perceived spiritual benefits.

However, dargah is originally a core concept in Islamic Sufism and holds great importance for the followers of Sufi saints. Many Muslims believe their wishes are fulfilled after they offer prayer or service at a dargah of the saint they follow. Devotees tie threads of mannat (منّت, "grace, favour, praise") at dargahs and contribute to langar and pray at dargahs.

Over time, musical offerings of dervishes and sheikhs in the presence of the devout at these shrines, usually impromptu or on the occasion of Urs, gave rise to musical genres like Qawwali and Kafi, wherein Sufi poetry is accompanied by music and sung as an offering to a murshid, a type of Sufi spiritual instructor. Today they have become a popular form of music and entertainment throughout South Asia, with exponents like Nusrat Fateh Ali Khan and Abida Parveen taking their music to various parts of the world.

In South Asia, dargahs are often the site of festivals (milad) held in honor of the deceased saint on the anniversary of his death (urs). The shrine is illuminated with candles or strings of electric lights at this time. Dargahs in South Asia, have historically been a place for all faiths since the medieval times; for example, the Ajmer Sharif Dargah was a meeting place for Hindus and Muslims to pay respect and even to the revered Saint Mu'in al-Din Chishti.

== List of present-day shrines ==
There are many active dargahs open to the public worldwide where aspirants may go for a retreat. The following is a list of dargahs open to the public.

- Shrine of Shaykh Abdul Qadir Gilani in Baghdad, Iraq
- Shrine of Khawaja Moinuddin Chishti, Ajmer Sharif Dargah, Ajmer, Rajasthan, India
- Shrine of Pir Muhammad Qasim Sadiq Mohrvi Mohra Sharif, Rawalpindi, Punjab, Pakistan
- Shrine of Ahmad Ullah Maizbhandari in Chittagong, Bangladesh
- Shrine of Syed Shah Wilayat Naqvi, Amroha, India
- Shrine of Lal Shahbaz Qalandar in Sehwan Sharif, Pakistan
- Shrine of Sultan ul Arifeen Hazrat Syed Rakhyal Shah Sufi AL Qadri in Dargah Fateh Pur Sharif Gandawah Balochistan Pakistan
- Shrine of Pir Hadi Hassan Bux Shah Jilani in Duthro Sharif, Pakistan
- Shrine of Muhammad Qasim Sadiq in Mohra Sharif, Murree, Pakistan
- Shrine of Baba Bulleh Shah in Kasur, Pakistan
- Shrine of Piran Kaliyar in, Roorkee, India.
- Shrine of Murshid Nadir Ali Shah in Sehwan Sharif, Pakistan
- Shrine of Data Ganj Bakhsh Ali al-Hujwiri, Data Darbar, Lahore, Pakistan
- Shrine of Shah Jalal in Sylhet, Bangladesh
- Shrine of Ashraf Jahangir Semnani at Ashrafpur Kichhauchha, Uttar Pradesh, India
- Shrine of Shah Ata in Gangarampur, West Bengal, India
- Shrine of Syed Ibrahim Badshah Shaheed, Erwadi, Tamil Nadu, India
- Shrine of Nagore Dargah in Nagore, Tamil Nadu, India
- Shrine of Sulthan Sikandhar Badhusha Shaheed, Thiruparankundram Dargah, Tamil Nadu, India
- Shrine of Meer Ahmad Ibrahim, Madurai Hazrat Maqbara, Madurai, Tamil Nadu, India
- Shrine of Shaykh Nazim Al-Haqqani in Lefka, Cyprus
- Hazrat Nizamuddin Dargah in Delhi, India
- Ma Laichi's Mausoleum (Hua Si Gongbei) in Linxia, China
- Mausoleum of Abu al-Hasan al-Shadhili in Egypt
- Abu al-Abbas al-Mursi Mosque in Egypt
- Ahmad al-Badawi Mosque in Tanta, Egypt
- Ibrahim El Desouki Mosque in Egypt
- Sidi Arif Mosque in Egypt
- Mosque and Khanqah of Shaykhu in Egypt
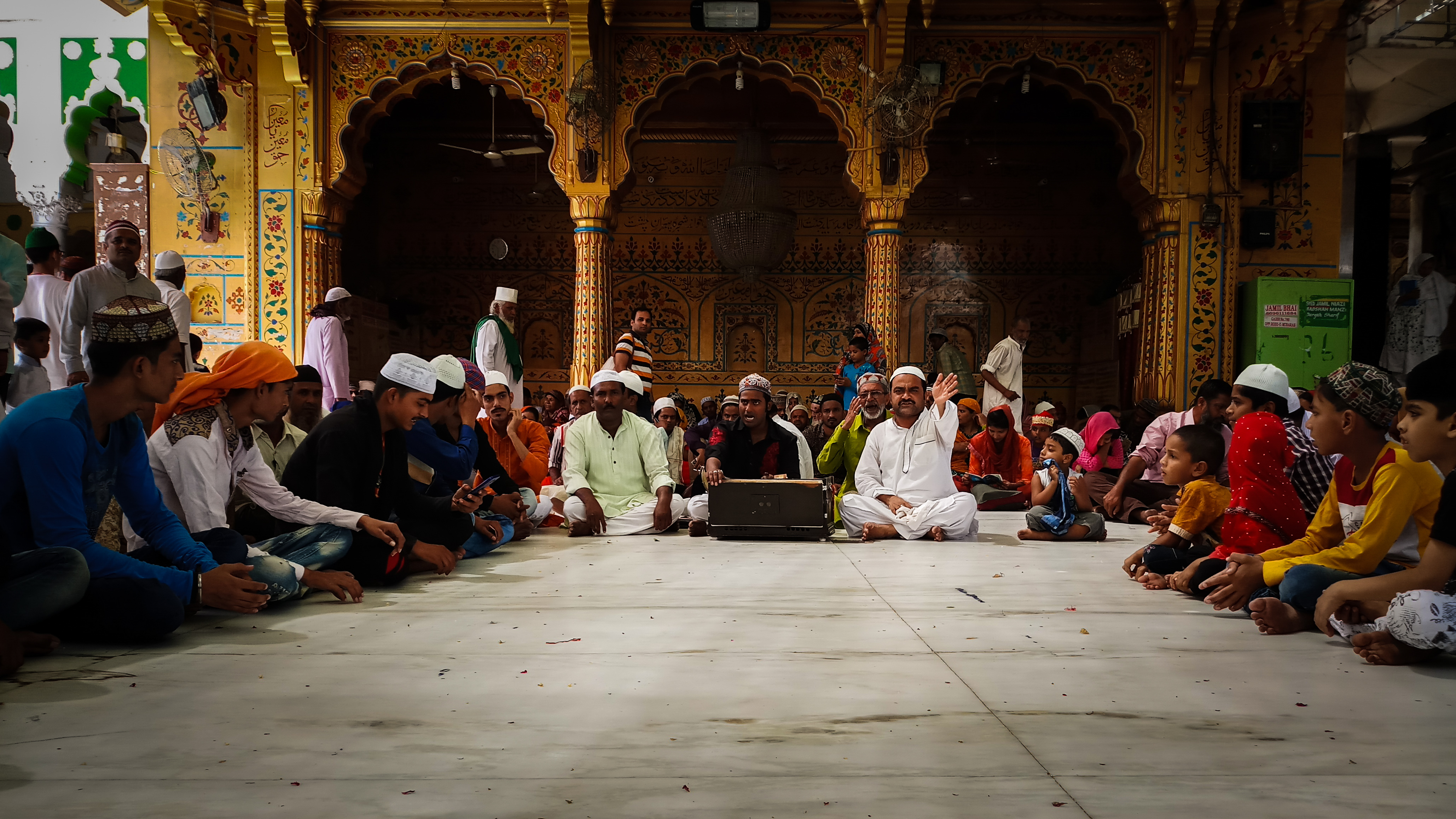
A qawwali performance at the Ajmer Sharif Dargah at Ajmer, India. The dargah houses the grave of Moinuddin Chishti of the Chishti order.

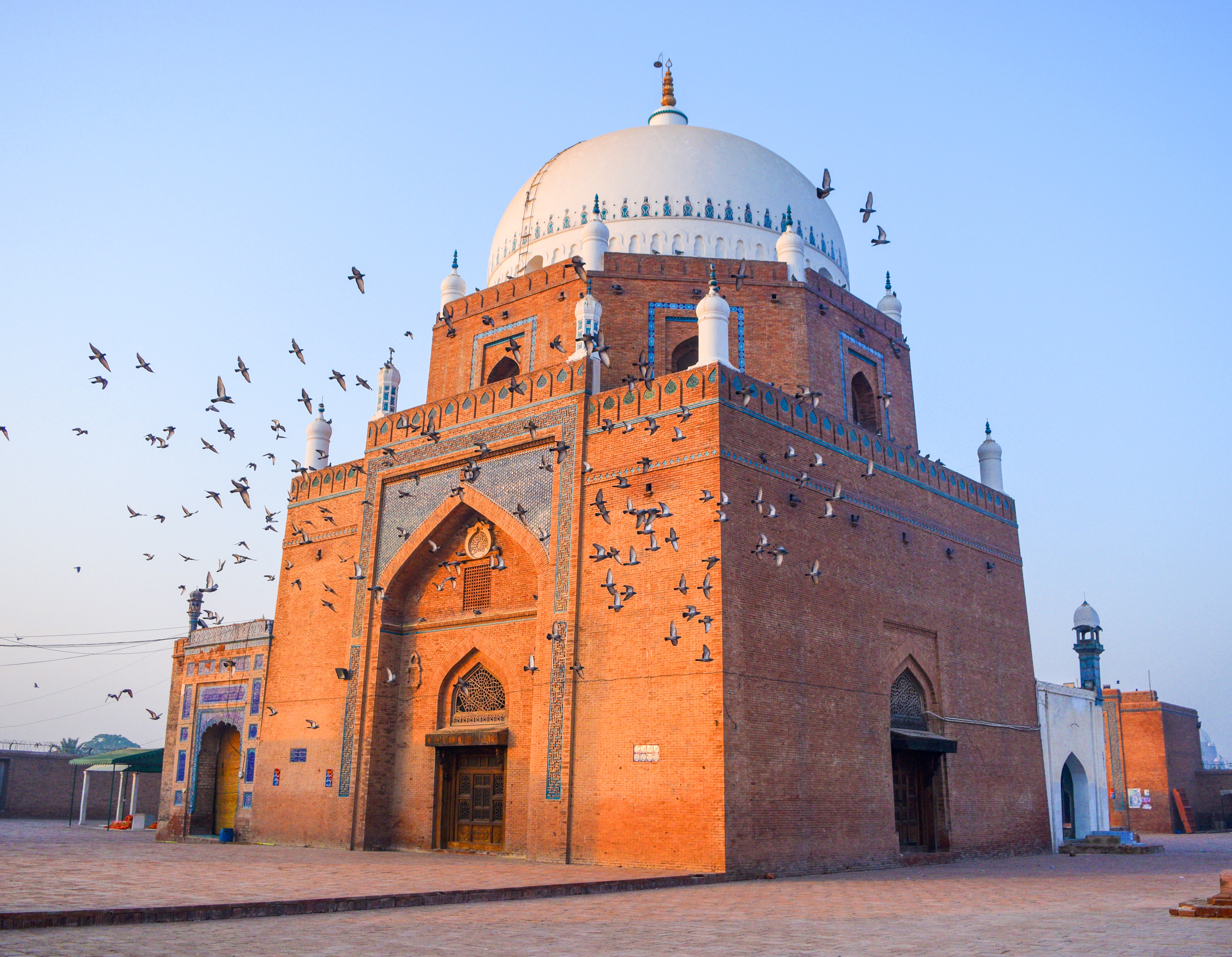
Shrine of Bahauddin Zakariya in Multan, Pakistan. Bahauddin Zakariya was a famous saint of the Suhrawardiyya order.

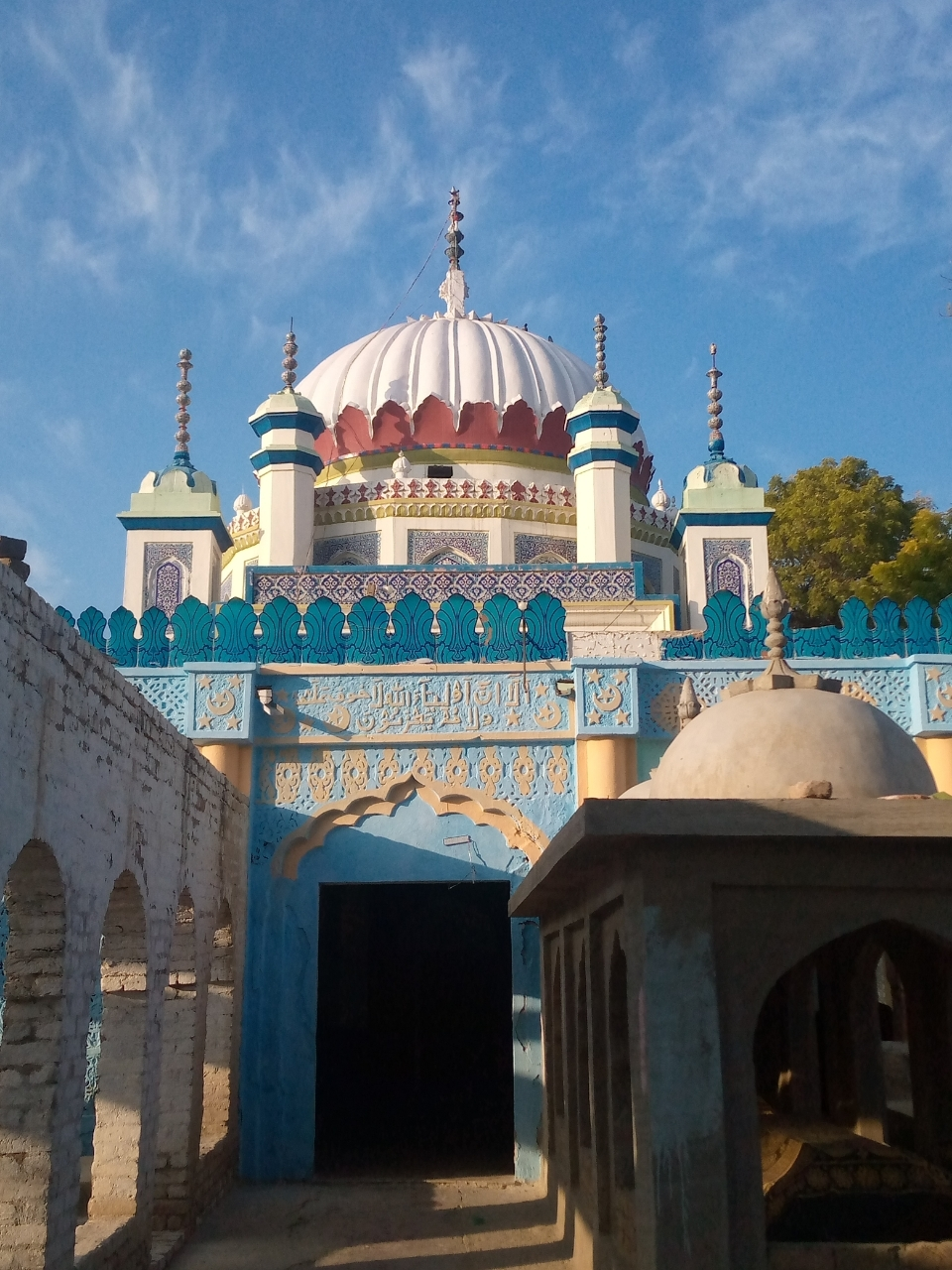
Shrine of Pir Hadi Hassan Bux Shah Jilani at Duthro Sharif in Sanghar District, Pakistan

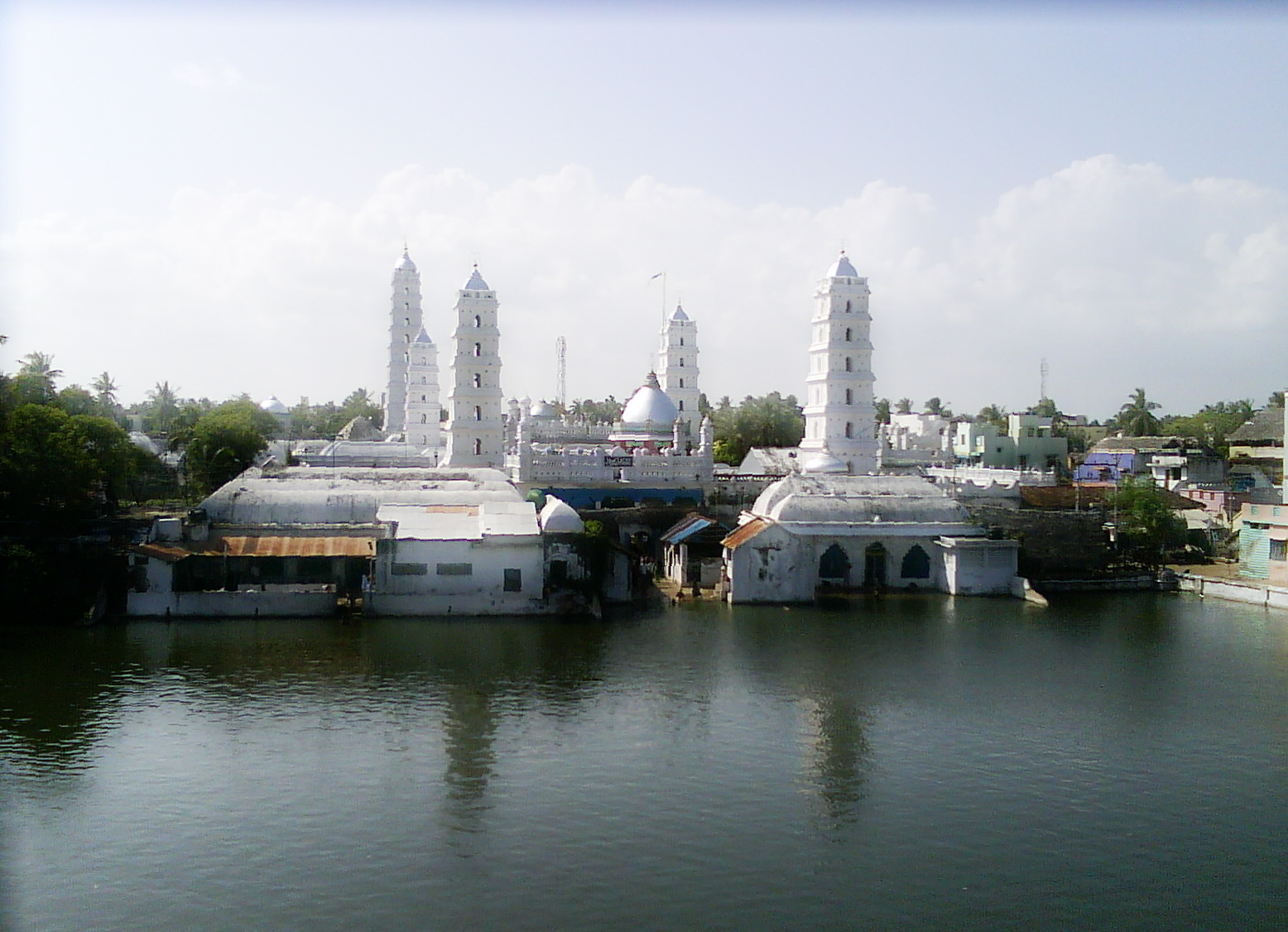
Hazrat Shahul Hameed Qadir Vali Bathusha Nayagam (R.A) in Nagore Dargah

== Islamisation of local non-Muslim populations ==
Sufi shrines and dargahs contributed to the spread of Islam in parts of the Indian subcontinent. Historians have examined their role in religious instruction, proselytisation, social interaction and the gradual Islamisation of local non-Muslim populations. Richard M. Eaton documents the relationship between shrines, agricultural expansion and the growth of Muslim communities in Punjab and Bengal between 1300 and 1700, emphasising gradual social and religious transformation rather than exclusively organised conversion campaigns. P. M. Currie's historical study of the Ajmer shrine examines the development of the cult of Mu'in al-Din Chishti and its influence in the region. Anna Bigelow's research further documents the participation of Hindu, Muslim and Sikh communities in shrine-centred religious practices.

== Opposition ==
The Ahl-i Hadith, Deobandi, Salafi and Wahhabi religious scholars argue against the practice of constructing shrines over graves, and consider it as associating partners with God, which is called shirk. They believe Islamic prophet Muhammad strongly condemned the practice of turning graves into places of worship and even cursed those who did so.

== See also ==
- Datuk Keramat
- Maqbara
- Marabout
- Mazar
