= Manas Ordo =

Mausoleum in northwest Kyrgyzstan, believed to be of Manas

Coordinates: 42.5250°N 72.3824°E

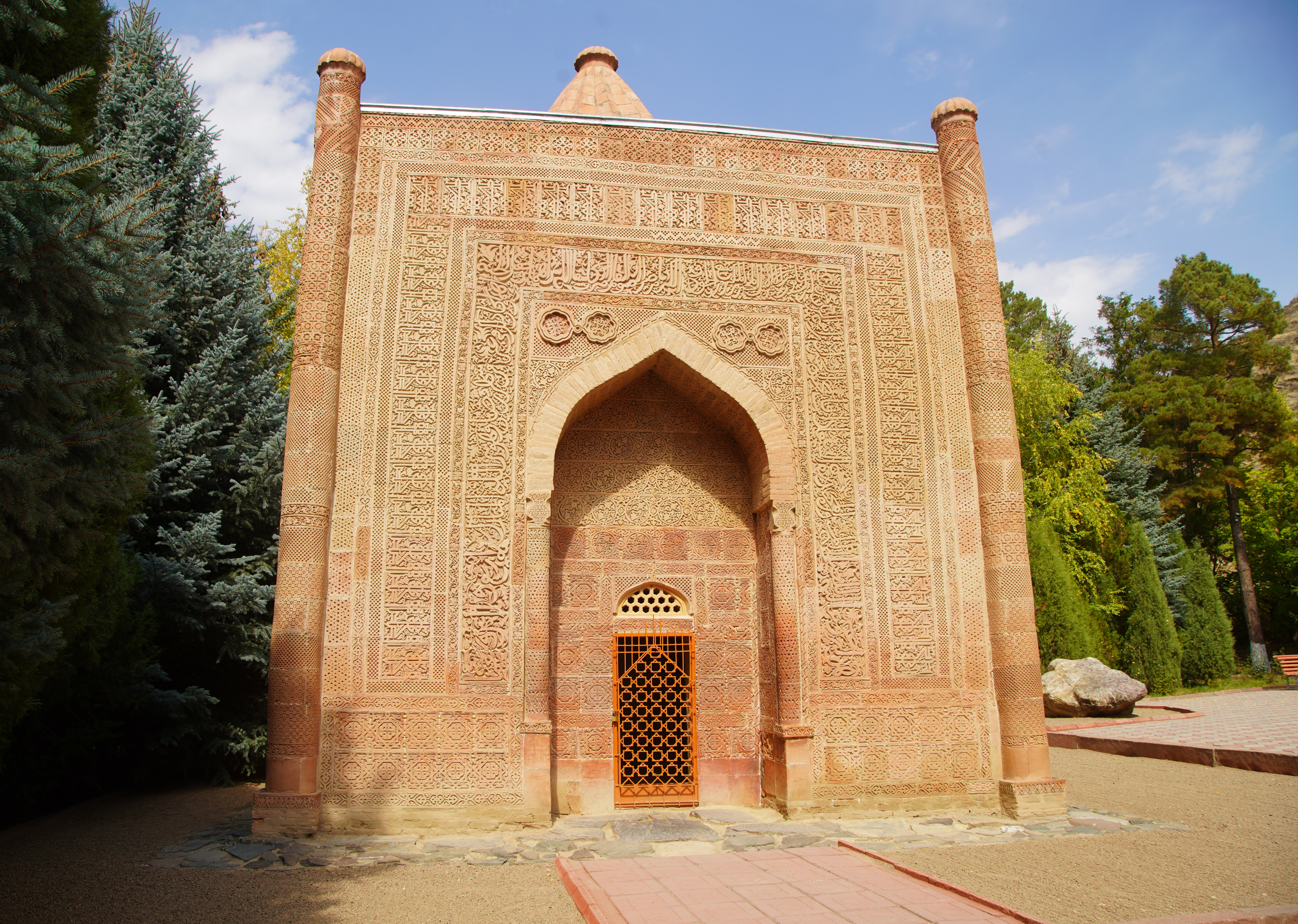
Manas's kümböz, the alleged burial site of Manas

Manas Ordo (Kyrgyz and Russian: Манас Ордо, [mɑnɑs ordó]) is a modern historical park (with a museum) built around Manas's Kümböz (Kyrgyz: Манастын күмбөзү, [mɑnɑstɯn kymbœzy]; Russian: Кумбез Манаса), a Karakhanid-era mausoleum most likely built around 1334 thought to be the final resting place of the Kyrgyz epic hero Manas. Among the Kyrgyz, the site has status as a mazar.

The mausoleum looks similar to other monuments from the 14th century, with kufic script around the outside edge of the monument.

== Background ==
The Kyrgyz epic hero Manas is said to have been buried in the Ala-Too mountains in Talas Province, in northwestern Kyrgyzstan. The mausoleum 12 km east of the town of Talas is believed to house his remains and is a popular destination for Kyrgyz travelers. Traditional Kyrgyz horsemanship games are held there every summer since 1995. An inscription on the mausoleum states, however, that it is dedicated to "...the most famous of women, Kenizek-Khatun, the daughter of the emir Abuka". Legend has it that Kanikey, Manas' widow, ordered this inscription in an effort to confuse her husband's enemies and prevent a defiling of his grave.

Indeed, when archaeologists opened the tomb, they found the skeleton of a man who was about 2 m tall (6.5 feet), not the skeleton of a woman. Academics and experts took this to mean that Manas Ordo was indeed the tomb of the legendary warrior, and not of the princess mentioned in the tomb's outer inscription.

While there are still skeptics that say that Manas was not buried in this mausoleum, the sight has nonetheless become a popular destination and an important spiritual sight in Kyrgyzstan.
