= Pir Hadi Hassan Bux Shah Jilani =

Sufi saint and poet (1846–1900)

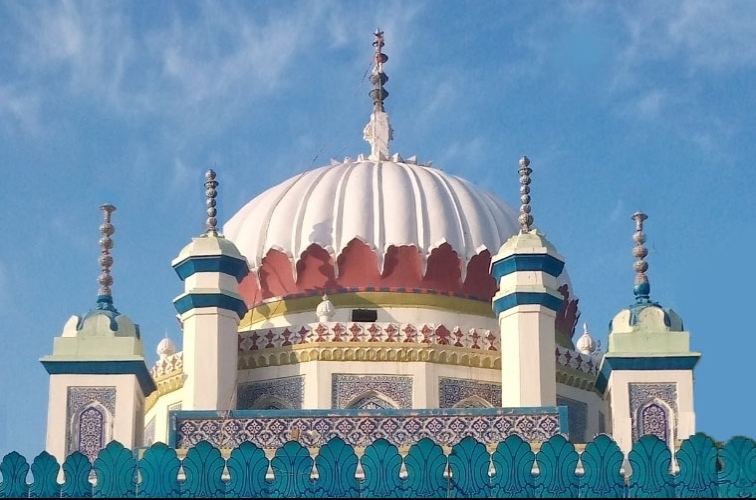
- Shrine of Pir Hadi Hassan Bux Shah jilani
- Title: Hadi

Personal life
- Born: 1846 AD (1262 A.H.) Dargah Bhuro Bhawan Shah Jilani, Buxho Laghari, Hyderabad, Sindh British India (present-day Pakistan)
- Died: 2 September 1900 AD (Jumada al-Awwal 7, 1318 A.H.) (aged 56) Duthro Sharif, Sanghar, Sindh, British India (present-day Pakistan)
- Resting place: Dargah Jilani, Duthro Sharif
- Parent: Pir Gulzar Ali Shah Jilani (father)
- Region: Sind
- Main interest(s): Quran, Sunnah, Sufism
- Notable idea(s): Mysticism, Sufi philosophy, Sindhi Sufi poetry

Religious life
- Religion: Islam
- Denomination: Sunni
- Order: Sufism Qadiriyya Order
- Tariqa: Qadiriyya
- Creed: Sufism, Mystic

Muslim leader
- Based in: Duthro Sharif
- Predecessor: Pir Gulzar Ali Shah Jilani
- Successor: Pir Dianl Shah Jilani (Pir Wado I)

Pir Hadi Hassan Bux Shah Jilani, commonly known by the title Hadi ('The Guider'; 1846–1900), was a Sufi saint and poet from Sanghar in modern-day Pakistan who belonged to Qadiriyya Sufi order. He was born at Dargah Bhuro Bhawan Shah Jilani near Hyderabad, Sindh and lived most of his life in Duthro Sharif Sanghar Sindh after traveling through Sindh to spread Islam and Sufism. He wrote his poetry mostly in Sindhi. The annual Urs of Hadi take place in the month of Jumada al-Awwal in Duthro Sharif Sanghar.

== Name ==
He was named by his parents Hassan Bux Shah. After spiritual changes in his life, he is referred to by his devotees and followers as Pir Hadi Hassan Bux Shah Jilani, Hadi Sain, or Murshid Hadi. "Hadi" means "The Guider".

== Early life ==
He was born in the year of 1846 (1262 A.H) in a small village known as Dargah Bhuro Bhawan Shah Jilani near Buxo Laghari, Hyderabad, Sind, British India (nowadays Sindh, Pakistan). After a few years he came under the supervision of his grandfather Subhan Ali Shah Jilani and migrated with him to near Duthro Sharif in a newly constructed village built by his grandfather and named Subhan Ali Shah Jilani.

== Family background ==
He was supposedly a descendent of Abdul Qadir Gilani. His family had many saints and spiritual leaders such as Abdul Malik Shah Jilani (India), who was the Murshid of Sufi Shah Inayat Shaheed, Bhuro Bhawan Shah Jilani, Juman Shah Jilani, Subhan Ali Shah Jilani, wado Kamil Shah Jilani, Ali Bux Shah Jilani, Kamil Shah Sarkar Jilani, Dinal Shah Jilani and many others.

== Education ==
Hadi spent his early life at Dargah Bhuro Bhawan Shah Jilani, his place of birth. After some time, he migrated to Sanghar and settled down near Duthro Sarif at his grandfather's village, known as Subhan Ali Shah Jilani, where he pursued the study of the Quran, Hadiths and Sunnah at Pir-Jo-Midrso under the supervision of his grandfather.

== Death ==
Hadi died on 2 September 1900 AD (Jumada al-Awwal 7, 1318 A.H.) at the age of 56 years.

== Dargah Sharif ==
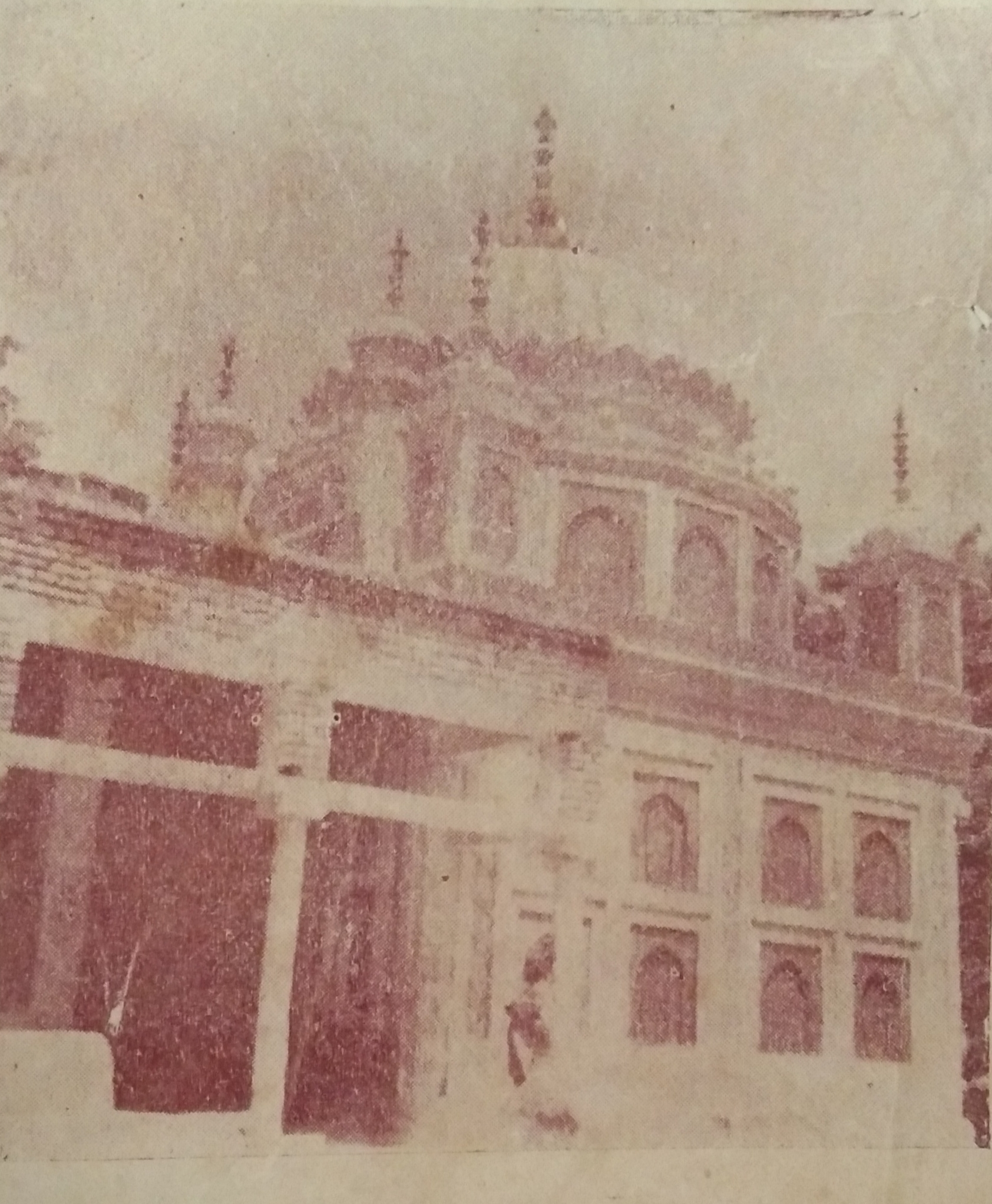
Dargah-e-Jilani in 1970s

Hadi's body was entombed in a shrine at Pir Subhan Ali Shah Jilani, which is known as Dargah Pir Hadi Hassan Bux Shah Jilani or Dargah Jilani Duthro Sharif. The foundation of Dargah Sharif was settled down by Pir Hadi Hassan Bux Shah Jilani. Hadi was actually contracting an Otaq for himself but after martyred his body was buried in his Otaq. Recently, with the help of Shahid Abdul Salam Thahim, Syed Ghulam Shah Jilani and MPA Faraz dero of the Sindh government have constructed a new mosque and Musafir Khana for pilgrims.

== Urs ==
Dargah Sharif on the occasion of 122nd Urs The annual celebration of Urs begins in the evening of 6-10 Jumada_al-awwal. Thousands of followers, devotees, pilgrims and lovers come from all over Sindh to attend it.
