= Duthro Sharif =

- Village
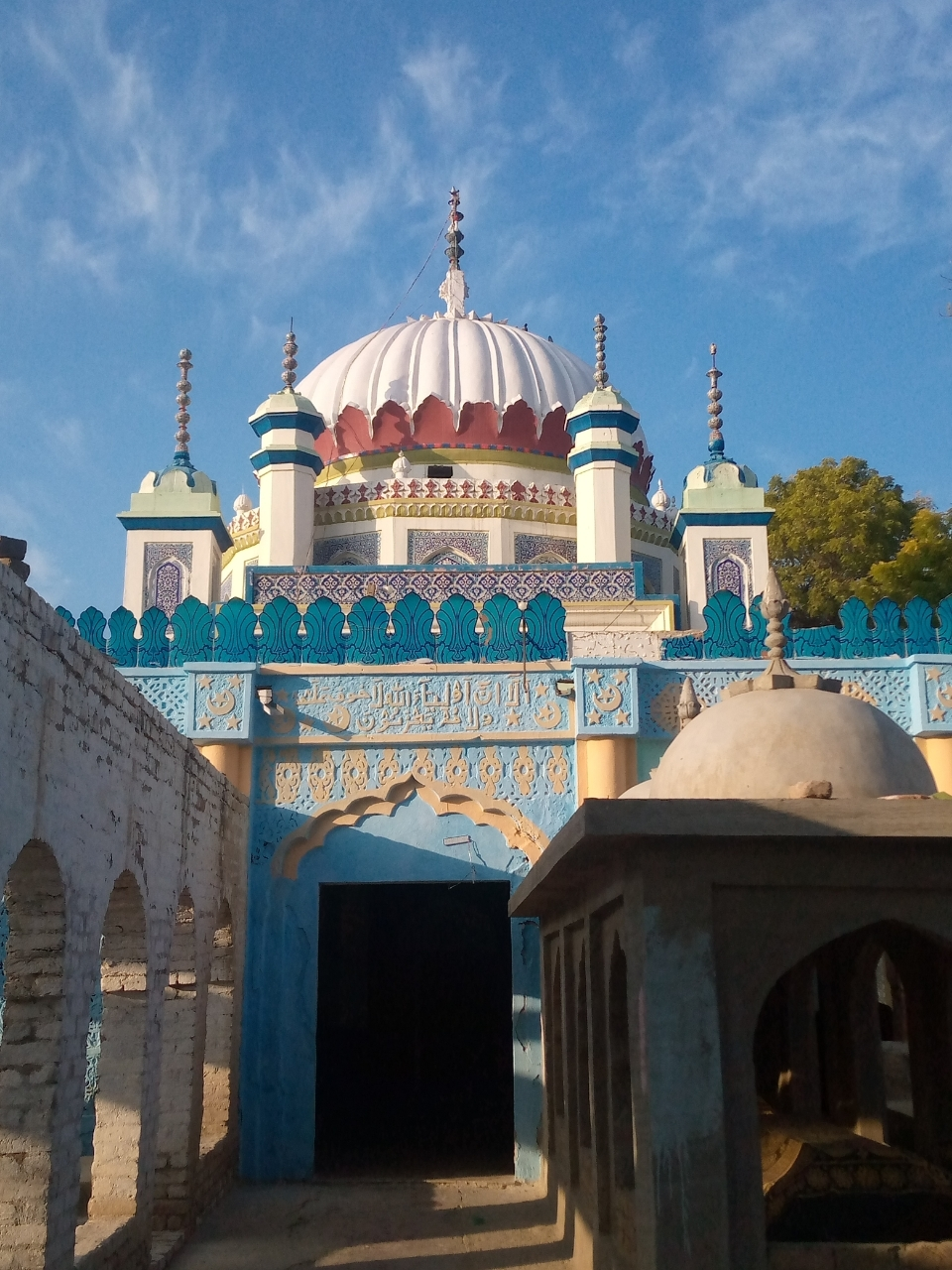
- Dargah Pir Hadi Hassan Bux Shah Jilani

- Location within Sindh Location within Pakistan
- Coordinates: 25.949649°N 68.725650°E
- Pakistan: Pakistan
- Province: Sindh
- District: Sanghar
- Taluka: Tando Adam
- Time zone: UTC+5 (PST)
- Post code: 68031

Duthro Sharif (Sindhi:ڊٺڙو شريف) is a village located in Talkua Tando Adam, District Sanghar in Sindh province, Pakistan. The Shrine of Pir Hadi Hassan Bux Shah Jilani is also located in the south east of Duthro Sharif.
