= Goripalayam Mosque =

Mosque in Madurai, Tamil Nadu, India

- கோரிப்பாளையம் தர்கா
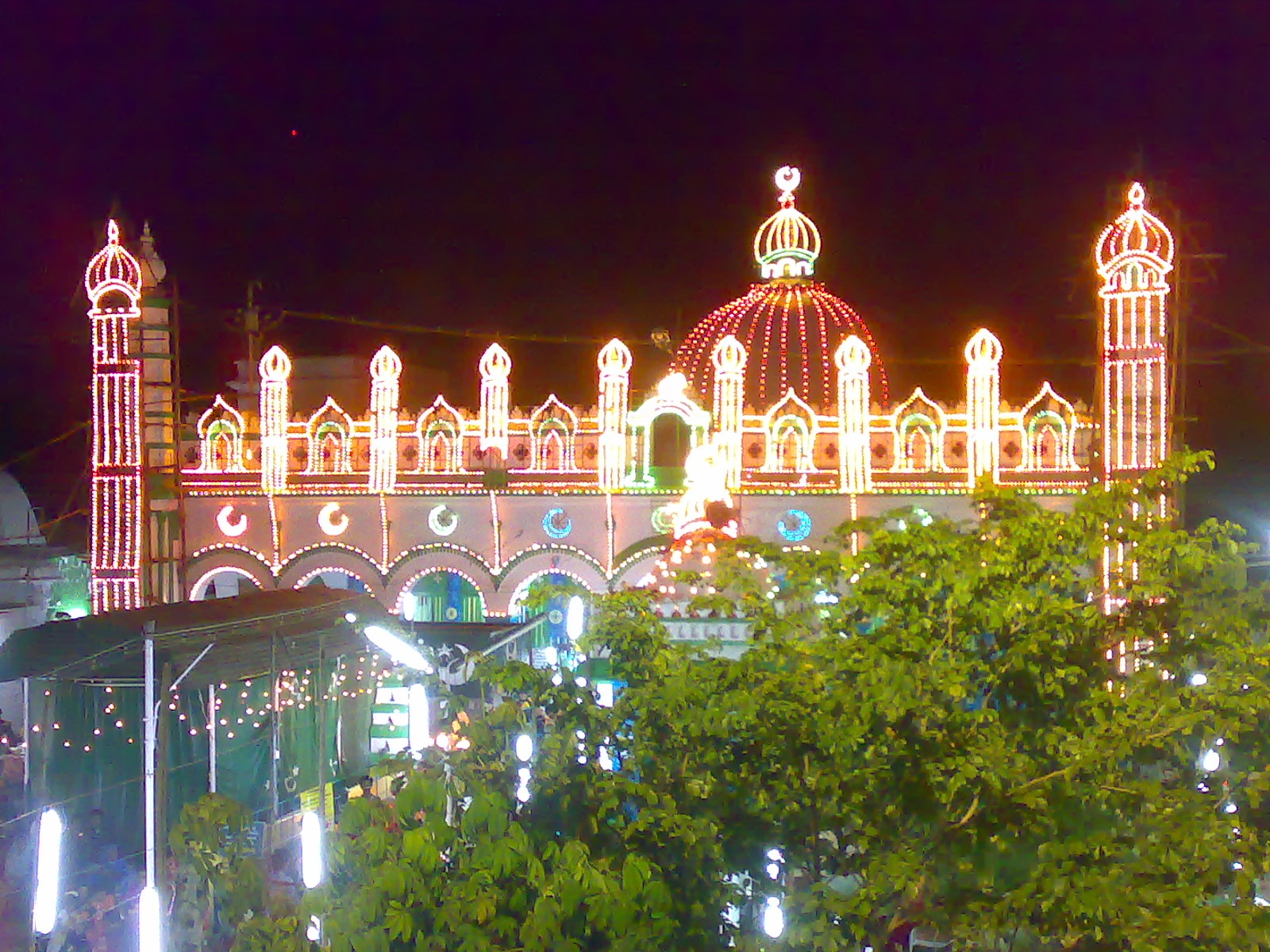
- The mosque at night in 2008

- Location of the mosque in Tamil Nadu

Religion
- Affiliation: Islam
- Festival: Urus: 15 Rabi al-awwal
- Ecclesiastical or organizational status: Mosque and dargah
- Status: Active

Location
- Location: Madurai, Tamil Nadu
- Country: India
- Interactive map of Goripalayam Mosque
- Coordinates: 9°55′47″N 78°07′45″E

Architecture
- Type: Mosque architecture
- Founder: Thirumalai Nayak
- Completed: 13th century

Specifications
- Dome: One
- Dome height (outer): 6.1 m (20 ft)
- Dome dia. (outer): 21 m (70 ft)

The Goripalayam Mosque (Tamil: கோரிப்பாளையம் தர்கா) is a large mosque and dargah complex, located in the Goripalayam area of Madurai City, in the state of Tamil Nadu, India. The mosque contains the tombs of the Sultan of Yemen, Khaja Syed Sultan Alauddin Badusha Razi, and a former Sultan of Madurai, Khaja Syed Sulthan Shamsuddin. There is also an invisible grave of Khaja Syed Sultan Habibuddin Razi, known as Ghaibi Sulthan who came to India to spread Islam. The mosque's dome is 21 metres (70 ft) in diameter, 6.1 metres (20 ft) high, and was made of a single block of stone from the Azhaga Hills. It is said that it was built by Thirumalai Nayak for his Muslim subjects.

== History ==
The name Gorippalayam comes from the Persian word gor which means grave. This area is called as Goripalayam because the graves of the two famous saints of Islam and rulers of Madurai, Sulthan Alauddin Badusha (Radiyallah) and Sulthan Shamsuddin Badhusha (Radiyallah), are located in the mosque's grounds. A beautiful green tomb can be seen from the A.V. Bridge, which is the Gorippalayam Dargah, located in the northern banks of Vaigai River.

People from all over Tamil Nadu come here to seek blessings and go back fruitfully. The two rulers were brothers who ruled the northern part of Madurai after coming from Oman during the 13th century to spread Islam after hearing about the travel of Qutb Sulthan Syed Ibrahim Shaheed Badusha of Erwadi and his victory in south India followed by the established Islamic rule in Madurai and Ramanathapuram provinces. Kazi Syed Tajuddin Radiyallah, the founder of Kazimar Big Mosque and who lived in Kazimar Street, was government Kazi (Islamic legal advisor and jury) to the Sultans. The descendants of Kazi Syed Tajuddin are still living in Kazimar Street and the Kazimar Big Mosque is maintained by his descendants. From the time of Sultans the Kazis to Madurai city are appointed from the descendants of Kazi Syed Tajuddin and this tradition was followed by the Pandiya Rulers, the Nayak rulers, the Nawab rulers and the British rulers. The independent democratic Government of Tamil Nadu appoints Kazi to Madurai only from the descendants of Kazi Syed Tajuddin. An ancient Tamil inscription can be found planted on the outer campus of the Maqbara of the dargah campus:

== Inscription ==
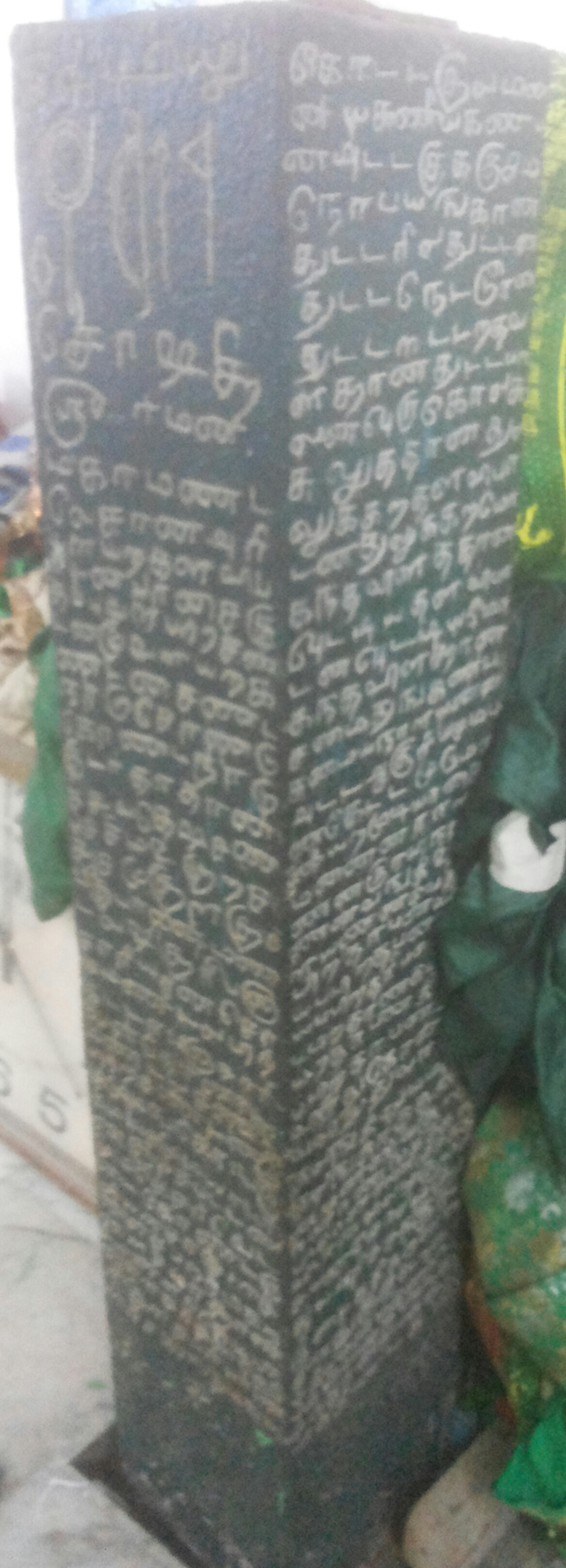
Verdict of Nayak ruler Veerappa Nayakkar regarding a dispute with the dargah land in an inscription mounted in the dargah

The descendants of Sulthan Alauddin Badusha, and Sulthan Shamsuddin Badusha (called as Sultans of Oman) purchased from the then King Koo(n) Pandiyan the land of Gorippalayam Dargah for a Feet of Gold piece and other six villages (namely Bibi Kulam, Chokkikulam, Cholikudi, Chirudoor, Kannanendal, Thiruppalai) at the rate of 14,000 Gold pieces for the maintenance of Gorippalayam Dargah. During the reign of King Veerappa nayakkar of the Madurai Nayak rulers, a dispute arose between the Huqdars of the Durgah and the employees of the Nayakkar Government regarding the six villages. The case was taken to King Veerappa Nayakkar, who inquired and verified the documents written by King Koo(n) Pandiyan and gave his verdict in the year 1573 A.D. as the Six villages and the Dargah land belongs to the Descendants of Sultans and it should be in their enjoyment till the existence of Sun and Moon and who violates this will be liable for the sin of slaughtering a cow in the bank of river Ganga.

This inscription is considered a piece of evidence to prove the existence of the dargah since 13th century.

== Urus Festival ==
The Urs, or anniversary festival of the dargah is held on 15th night of the Islamic month of Rabi al-awwal on every hijri year.

== See also ==
- Islam in India
- Athankarai Dargah
- List of dargahs in Tamil Nadu
- List of mosques in India
