= Kazimar Big Mosque =

Mosque in Madurai, Tamil Nadu, India

Kazimar Big Mosque (Kazimar Periya Pallivasal)
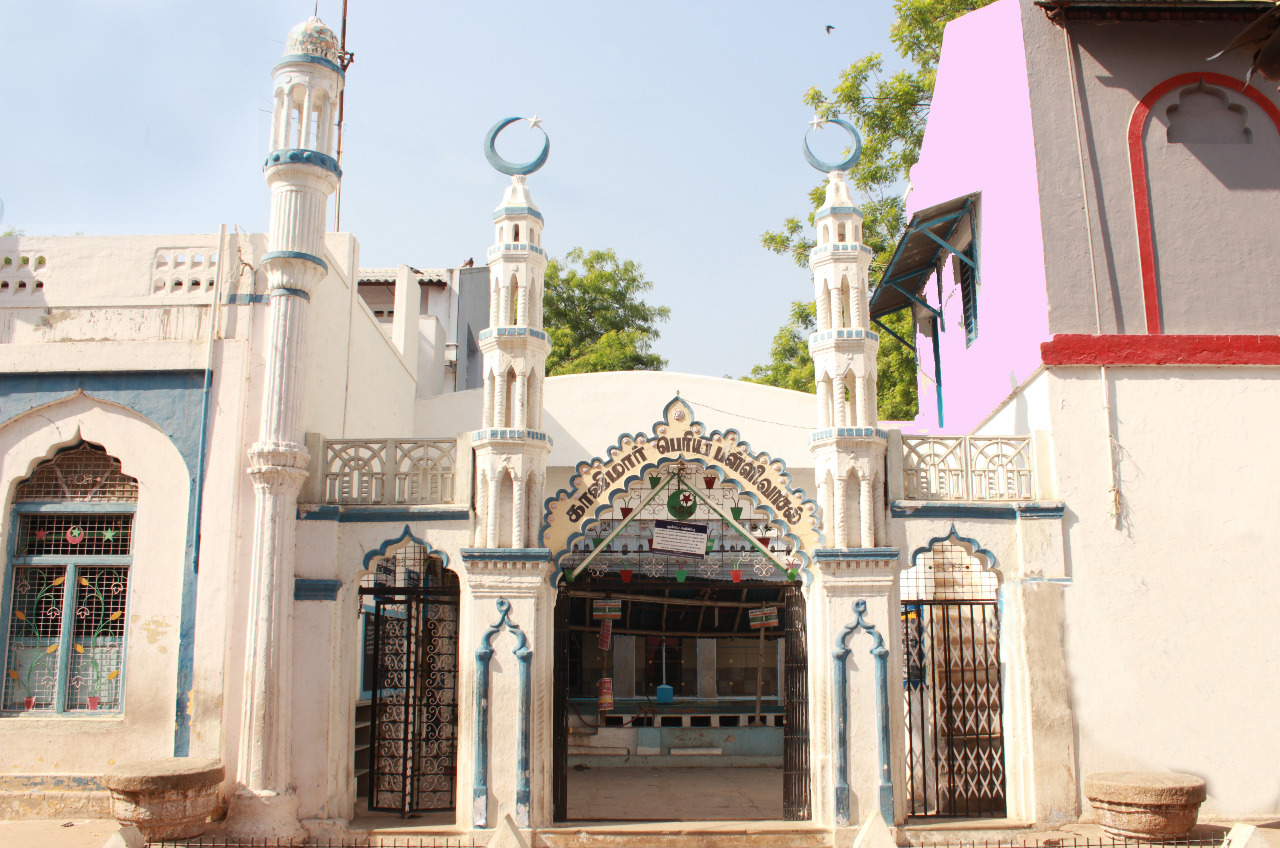
- The main entrance to the mosque

- Location of the mosque in Tamil Nadu

Religion
- Affiliation: Sunni Islam
- Sect: Sufism, Hanafi, Shazuli, Qadiri
- Festival: Urs: 15 Rajab
- Ecclesiastical or organisational status: Mosque and dargah
- Leadership: (Govt. Qazi of Madurai:); – Moulana Moulavi A. Syed Khaja Mueenudeen; (Imams:); – Moulavi Hafil Syed Muhammad Mueenuddeen Ibrahim; – Moulavi Hafil Syed Alimullah
- Status: Active

Location
- Location: Madurai, Tamil Nadu
- Country: India
- Coordinates: 9°54′46″N 78°06′51″E

Architecture
- Type: Mosque architecture
- Style: Indo-Islamic
- Founder: Kazi Syed Tajuddin
- Groundbreaking: 1281 CE
- Completed: 683 AH (1284/1285 CE)

Specifications
- Capacity: 1,200 worshipers
- Dome: One
- Minaret: Eight
- Shrine: One (Madurai Maqbara)
- Materials: Calcium sandstone

Website
- maqbara.com

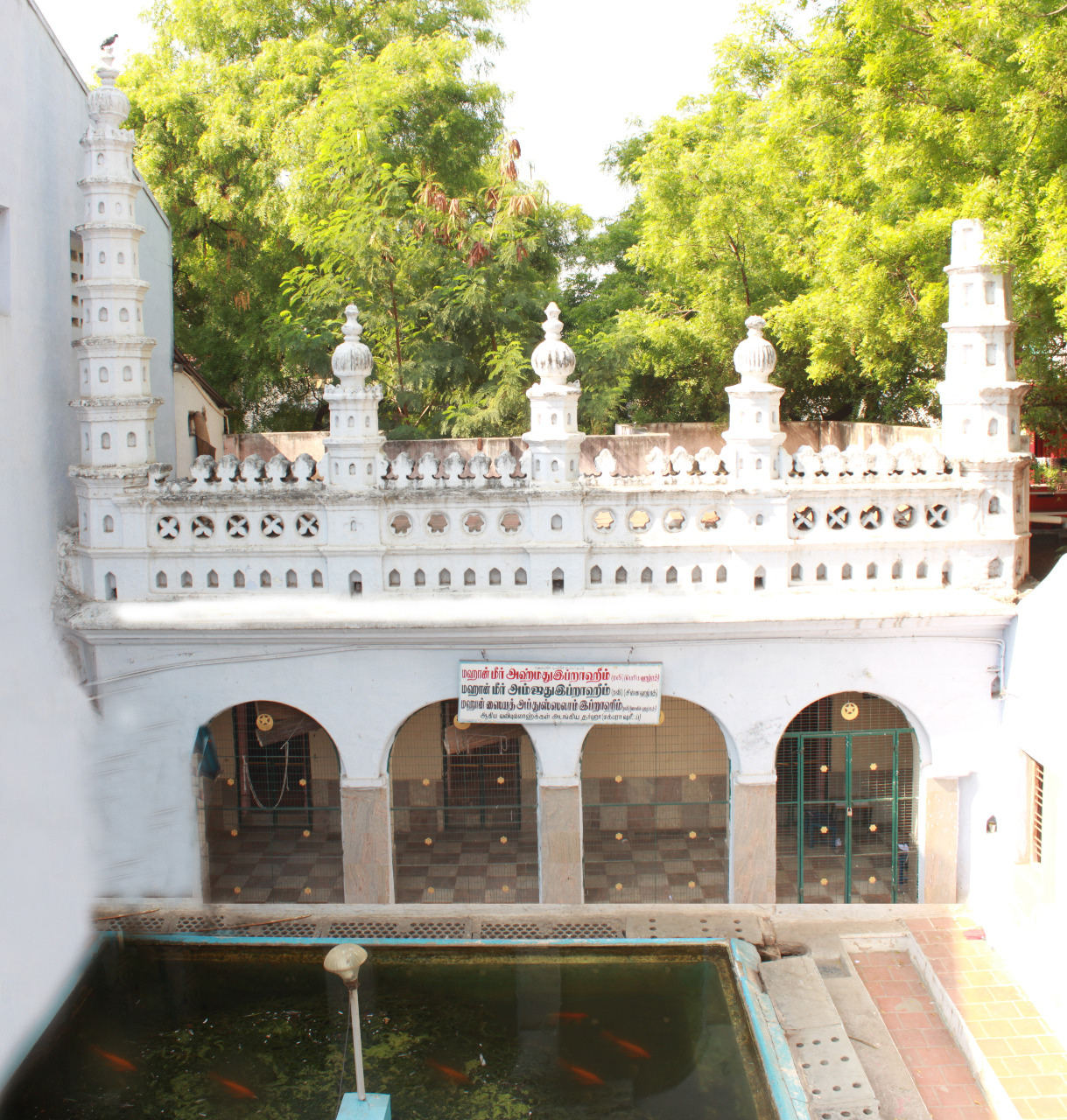
Madurai Hazrat's Maqbara located within the Big Mosque

The Kazimar Big Mosque, also known as the Kazimar Periya Pallivasal, is a Sufi Hanafi mosque in Madurai city, in the state of Tamil Nadu, India. The mosque was constructed in 683 AH (1284/1285 CE) and is the oldest mosque in the city. The mosque was founded by Kazi (Note: Interchangeable with Qazi or Qadi.) Syed Tajuddin, a descendant of the Islamic prophet Muhammad, who came from Yemen during 13th century and received this land from the King Kulasekara Ku(n) Pandiyan.

The mosque can accommodate approximately 1,200 worshipers and is within 500 metres (1,600 ft) of the Periyar (central) bus stand, and within 1 kilometre (1,100 yd) southeast of Madurai Junction railway station, and 1.5 kilometres (1,600 yd) southwest of the Meenakshi Temple.

== Founder ==
Kazi Syed Tajuddeen founded the mosque. He was the son of Jamaluddin Mufti al Ma'abari who travelled to India from Yemen during 13th century. Syed Tajuddeen's elder brother, Syed Alauddin, settled in Kayalpatnam, and he died and is buried there. Syed Tajuddeen settled in Madurai and began the construction of the mosque in the 1281 CE. The construction took three years and the mosque was opened for prayers in 1284 CE. Hazrat Kazi Syed Tajuddin died on 15 Rajab 692 AH (March 1293 CE) and was interred in the large cemetery surrounding the mosque. Urus, the anniversary of the death of Qazi Syed Tajuddin, called Founder's Day, is celebrated in the mosque on 15th of Rajab annually.

=== Huqdars and mosque management ===
The descendants of the founder, Kazi Syed Thajuddeen, are referred as huqdhars (Note: Huqdars, or shareholders, of the mosque are given the title of Syed.) of the mosque, and as of 2018 total approximately 450 individuals, the majority of who are the 19th and 20th generation of the founder's descendants. Almost all of the huqdhars have lived in Kazimar Street since the 13th century, and have continually managed the mosque since its establishment. Many are closely inter-related. All Syeds belong to the Hanafi school of Sunni Islam, and most of the descendants of the founder are Shazulis who practice the Sufi order, (Tariqa) Fassiya ash Shazuliya.

During his lifetime the mosque was managed by Kazi Syed Tajuddin. The right to manage the mosque by the descendants of the founder was confirmed by the Tamil Nadu Waqf Board in 1954 after the Independence of India, when all Waqf properties were surveyed. The genealogical records of all the heirs of Syed Tajuddin and the managers of the mosque are maintained in the mosque office. All 450 descendants of Syed Tajuddin constitute the general body from among whom the management committee of the mosque is selected. In January 2017 the general body of huqdars resolved to appoint a committee of four as trustees, and to appoint an additional ten members as executive members. The management committee comprises the four trustees and the ten executive members.

==== Kazis of Madurai ====
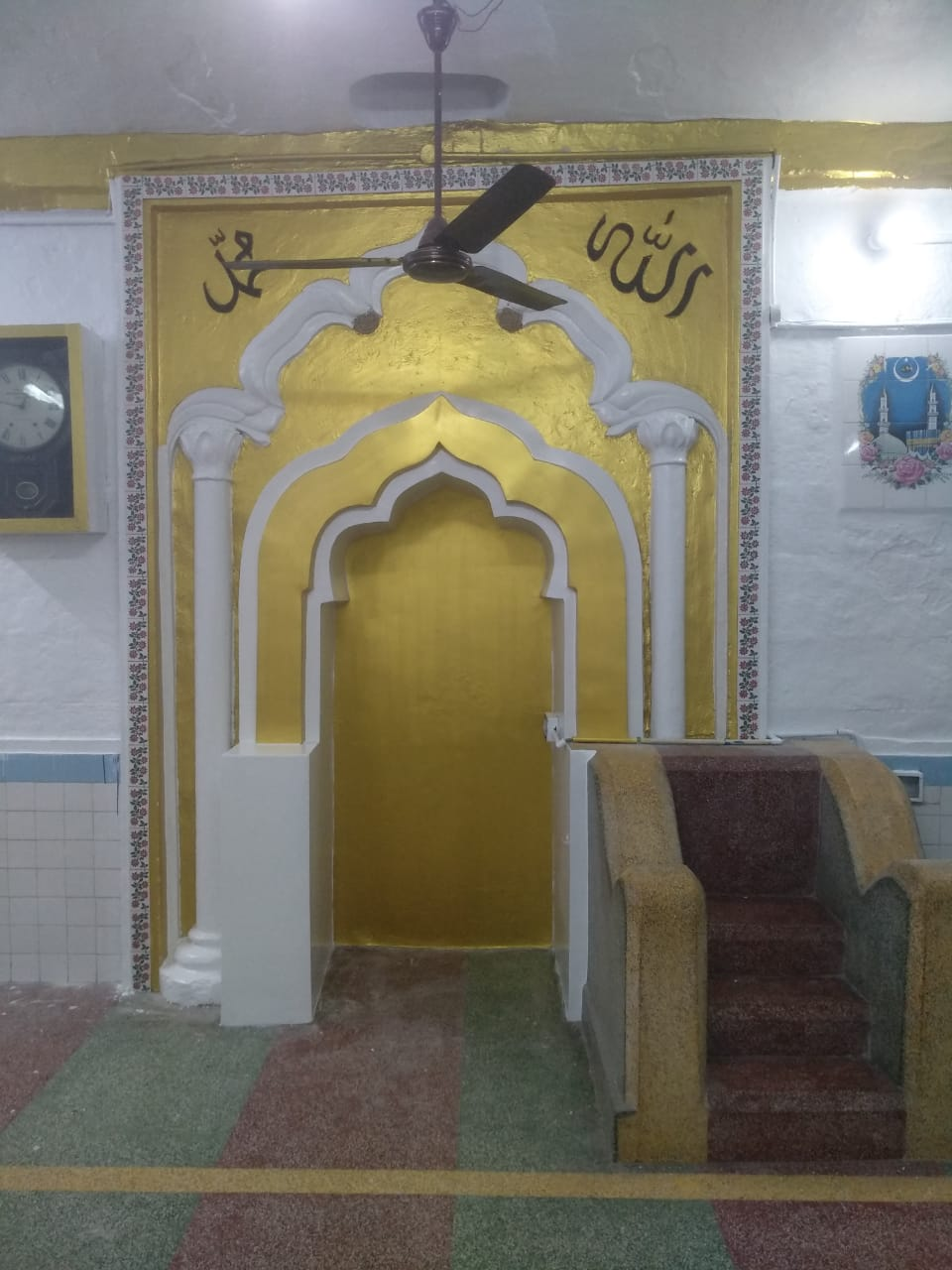
The musallah and pulpit of the mosque from where Hazrat Qazi Syed Tajuddeen, his descendant Qazi Meer Ahmad Ibrahim Periya Hazrat and other Qazis lead prayers.

Syed Tajuddin was appointed as Kazi of Madurai by the Government of Madurai Sultans and till today his descendants are appointed as Kazis to the Government of Tamil Nadu. Sheikhuna Meer Ahmad Ibrahim, known as Periya, was appointed as Chief Qazi (Qaziyul Quzzat) of Madurai by the government of Nawab of Arcot. The huqdars of the mosque have been appointed as Kazis of Madurai to the government continuously since 13th century. The present government Qazi of Madurai, Moulana Moulavi A. Syed Khaja Mueenudeen is huqdar of this mosque and a descendant of the founder.

==== Imams ====
The founder, Syed Tajuddin, was the imam of the mosque during his lifetime. The service of presiding the daily prayers and Friday sermons (Imamat and Qitabat) are done by the descendants of the founder. Since 1998, the imams have been Moulavi Hafil Syed Muhammad Mueenuddeen Ibrahim and Moulavi Hafil Syed Alimullah.

== Maqbara ==
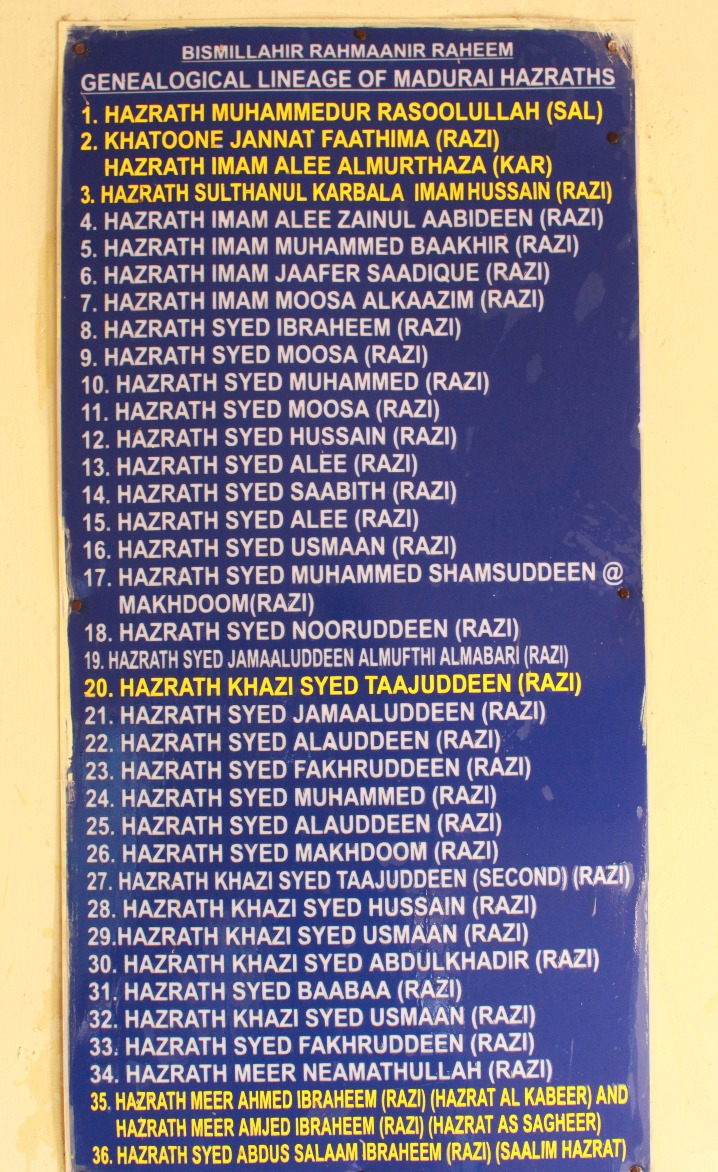
The genealogical lineage of Qazi Syed Tajuddin and Maqbara Hazrats as seen in Madurai Maqbara.

The Madurai Maqbara is the grave (or dargah) of Madurai Hazrats (Sheikhuna Meer Ahamad Ibrahim Periya Hazrat, Sheikhuna Meer Amjad Ibrahim Chinna Hazrat and Sheikhuna Syed Abdus Salaam Ibrahim Saalim Hazrat - all descendants of Islamic Prophet Muhammad). The dargah is located inside the mosque. People from all over India and foreign visitors come here for ziyarat (spiritual visit). The anniversary urus of Periya Hazrat is commemorated on 13th of Ramadan and Chinna Hazrat on 28th of Shawwal. Syed Abdus Salaam Ibrahim Saalim Hazrat's anniversary is celebrated on 18th of Rabiul Aakhir.

== Madrasa ==
Kazi Syed Tajuddin Arabi Madrasah is located inside the mosque campus in which around 120 students learn basic Arabic. The madrasa is managed by the Kazimar Big Mosque, is run by Moulavi Hafil Syed Alimullah Baqavi.

== See also ==
- Islam in India
- List of mosques in India
