= Khutba Periya Palli, Kayalpattinam =

Mosque in Tamil Nadu, India

Khutba Periya Palli (Al Jami'ul Kabeer)
- (குத்பா பெரிய பள்ளி, காயல்பட்டினம்)
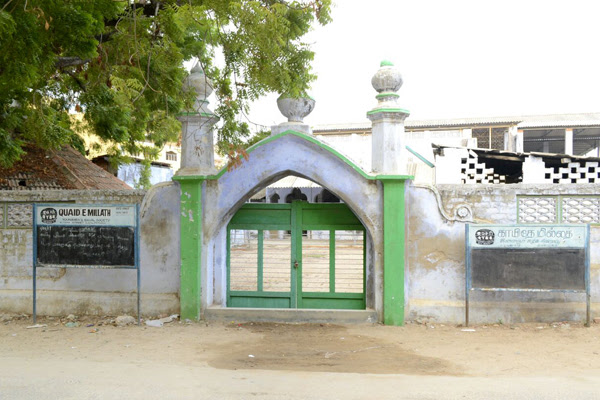
- The main entrance to the mosque in 2021

- Location of the mosque in Tamil Nadu

Religion
- Affiliation: Islam
- Ecclesiastical or organisational status: Friday mosque
- Status: Active

Location
- Location: Nainar Street, Kayalpattinam, Thoothukudi district, Tamil Nadu
- Country: India
- Coordinates: 8°34′03″N 78°07′38″E

Architecture
- Type: Mosque architecture
- Style: Dravidian
- Founder: Muhammad Khalji (832)
- Funded by: Sultan Sayyid Jamaluddin (1336)
- Completed: 842 CE (original building); 737 AH (1336/1337 CE) (reconstruction)
- Inscriptions: Two (maybe more)

Website
- jummaperiyapalli.com

The Khutba Periya Palli, also known as the Al Jami'ul Kabeer (Tamil: குத்பா பெரிய பள்ளி, காயல்பட்டினம், romanized: Grand Jumu'ah Masjid, lit. 'Big Juma Mosque') and as the Periya Khutba Palli, is a Friday mosque, located in Kayalpattinam, in the Thoothukudi district of the state of Tamil Nadu, India.

== History ==
The mosque was built in 842 CE by Muhammad Khalji, and was re-constructed in 737 AH (1336/1337 CE) by Sultan Sayyid Jamaluddin. In 2021, it was reported that the mosque was again being re-constructed.

== Architecture ==
The mosque along with the others in the town, is one of the greatest examples how Dravidian architecture influenced on Islamic architecture. The mosque has the special name "Aayirangal Thoon Palli". There is a large cemetery located adjacent to the mosque, that contains the tombs of the Malabar Sultans, an independent Muslim sultanate also called the Madhurai Sultanate, established during the 14th century on the Coromandel Coast and lasted for less than 50 years before it was terminated by the Hindu Vijayanagara Empire. It is claimed that 25,000 saints were buried in the cemetery.

== Gallery ==
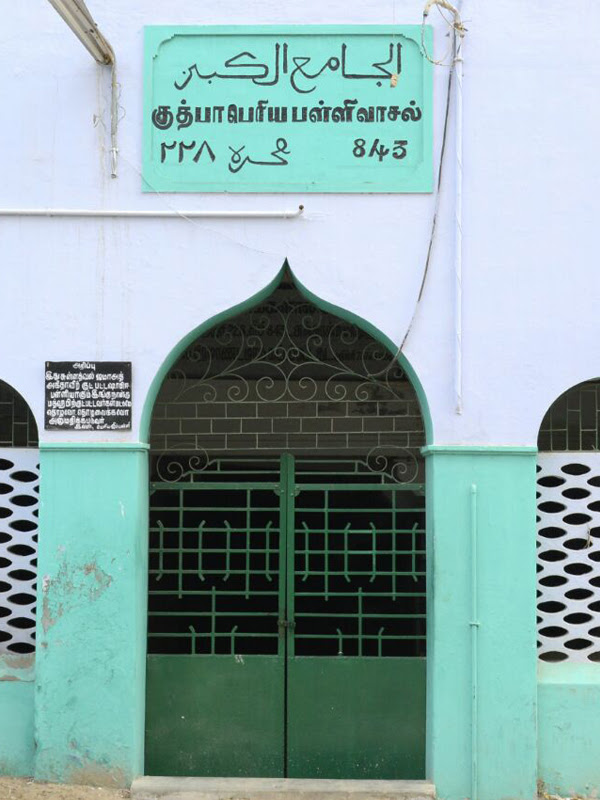
Side entrance with Arabic and Tamil inscription of 842 CE

== See also ==
- Islam in India
- List of mosques in India
