= Tomb of Shaykh Changal =

Shrine in Dhar, Madhya Pradesh

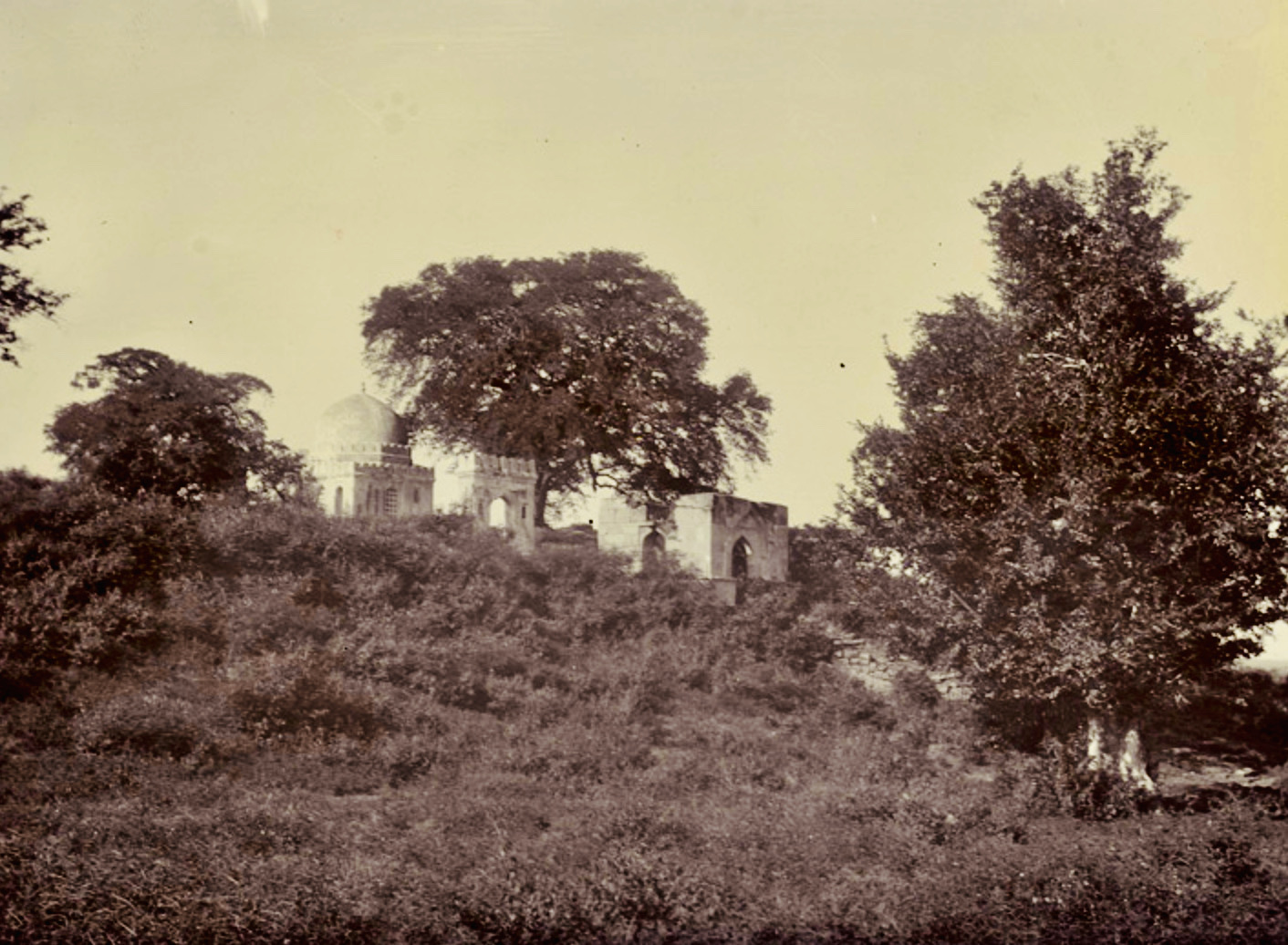
Dhār (Madhya Pradesh). Tomb of 'Abdullāh Shāh Changāl as documented in 1902 before reconstruction.

Dhār, Madhya Pradesh. Study of historical city showing location of the Tomb of 'Abdullāh Shāh Changāl on the southern ramparts.

The Tomb of Shaykh Changāl is a domed shrine or rauza located on the southern ramparts of the old circular city of Dhar, Madhya Pradesh. It is also referred to as Chālis Pīr (Hindi: चालीस पीर) because it marks the site where a group of early émigrés were attacked and killed by a mob while at prayer. Local residents identify a circular tank, just west of rauza, as the place where their remains were dumped.

'Abdullāh Shāh Changāl was a warrior saint whose exploits are recorded in a Persian language inscription dated 1455, now incorporated into the compound gate. A record of historical and social interest, it recounts the Shaykh's arrival in Dhār and his conversion of Bhoja and his followers to Islām. The story attests to the rising interest in Bhoja's biography in the 14th and 15th centuries, and the attempts made at to appropriate his legacy in Sanskrit and Persian literature.

== Architecture, inscription and traditions ==
The tomb is a modest domed structure, located on the crest of the old ramparts. It was entirely rebuilt in the second half of the 20th century after the site was vandalised. The remains of a small mosque, also rebuilt but retaining older fragments, is found on the staircase up to the tomb. The inscription, damaged but now kept behind protective iron doors, dates to the 15th century in the time of the Sultans of Malwa. It records that the building was a reconstruction, made after an earlier tomb had fallen into ruin.

A number of traditions about Shaykh Changāl are recorded in Urdu and English sources. Captain E. Barnes, for example, reported in 1904 that Bhoja was buried beside the Shaykh in the tomb. Further traditions are explored in M. W. Khān Dhāravi, 'Abdullah Changal (Dhār, 1964) in a rare lithograph documented by the Endangered Archives Programme.

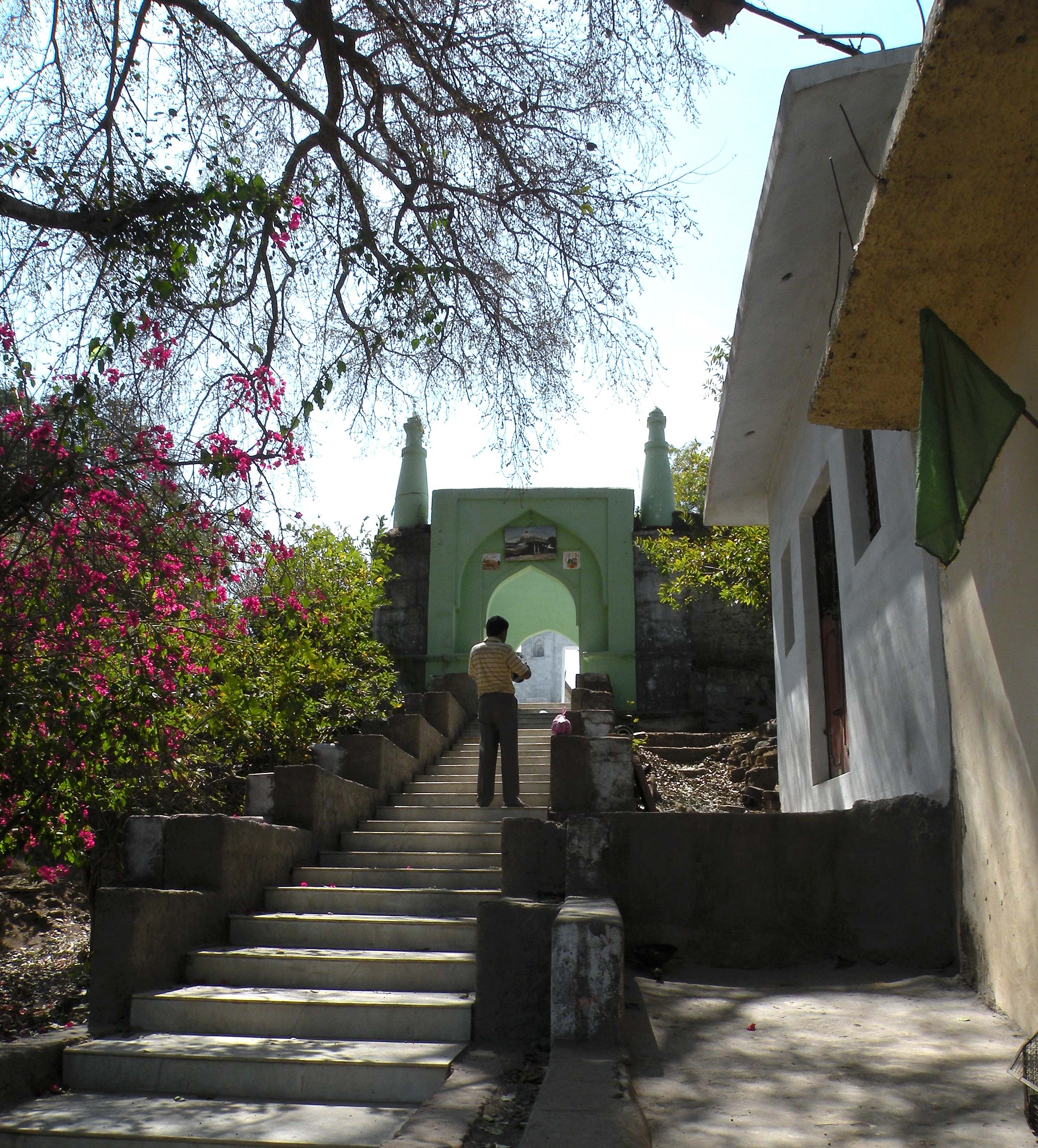
Dhār (Madhya Pradesh). Entrance to the tomb of Shaykh Changāl, 2010.

== Translation of the inscription ==
The inscription as re-translated and publish in 2012 is as follows:

1. Our Lord Almighty is sublime! This dome of splendour,

Over this grave of purity is like the heavenly house.

2. Perhaps it is a niche for a glass lamp, Above the star, it is a light upon a light.

3. Or is it the holy valley of Moses itself, Upon which Mount Sinai gloriously manifests?

4. Indeed, this shrine is the court of a royal falcon, Who has trapped the demon in his talons.

5. The head of the Abdāl, ‘Abdullāh Changāl -- What a Changāl -- that night and dawn saw him revel.

6. His liturgy was the songs and melodies of the nightingales, His anthem was the calls of birds and bees.

7. His musky mud (house) was the halva of unity, His electuary of rapture borrowed the fragrant camphor (of paradise).

8. His wine of delight was in cups and goblets, His kebab of love was in pots and ovens.

9. Angels salute him at every breath, Holy maidens greet him at every dawn.

10. This centre became Muslim, initiated first by him, All the banners of religion were held up and spread by him.

11. It has been said that before him, Several others had visited this desolate ruin.

12. When the muezzin called the morning prayer, Like a Sufi intoxicatingly sounding his trumpet,

13. Infidels raided from every side, Each one rushing forward with swords and cleavers.

14. Finally, they pinned those men of religion to the ground, And after killing them, concealed their bodies in a deep pit.

15. Now, this treasure trove of martyrs is a vestige, Of those pure and righteous-hearted people.

16. When time came for the sun of truth, To shine on this winter solstice,

17. This lion-hearted man came from the centre of religion, To this ancient temple with his group of men.

18. He destroyed the images of the idols, And transformed the temple into a place for prayer.

19. When Rai Bhoj saw this, through wisdom, He became a Muslim, along with all the warriors.

20. This region became illuminated with the light of the true law, And the customs of idolatry were rejected and made extinct.

21. Now, this garden grove, since the days of yore, Has been a holy place of pilgrimage.

22. Because the graves are so old, they have become flat, No mound remains on any grave.

23. There was no other place for quiet retreat, For dervishes in distress to find comfort.

24. So that great king of the world, Commanded that they rebuild this holy mountain.

25. A king of graceful countenance, Sultan of the world, Visitors bowing at his door step were the Great Khan and the emperor of China.

26. 'Alā’ al-Dīn wa’l-Dūnyā Abū’l-Muẓaffar, Triumphed over his enemies with the help of God,

27. So in that era, with Maḥmūd as the king of the world, The world flourished like heaven, thanks to his justice.

28. It was he who made this ancient land prosper, And rebuilt this house all over again.

29. Because there was empty space above his tomb, This dome confined and protected it.

30. A dome and several chambers to the north, Built for praying and worshiping God,

31. A delightful hospice facing the direction of prayer where travellers from far can rest.

32. Perhaps one day a pious person will come to this place and be happy for a moment.

33. He can spend some time in peace, And a while with a holy friend, away from grief.

34. He may drink from the cup poured by the invisible cup-bearer, And from that moment be intoxicated and transported.

35. For others like us, thirsty-hearted from the pain, He might pour a drop in the mouths of those deprived.

36. Let us also pray for the benevolent builder! May God keep him safe until the sounding of the trumpet. 37. May his existence and his kingdom be everlasting, May all his efforts and good deeds be appreciated.

38. O God! As long as the world exists, Preserve this, the king’s edifice of beneficence, until the sounding of the trumpets of the Day of Judgement.

39. From the clouds of his bounty he bestows bounty on the world, The same way that the creator of light gave his light to all.

40. From the Hijra it was 859 (1455), The date of which was written anew.

41. A beggar of the king’s court and of the door of the Shaykh, Strung these hidden pearls.

42. Perhaps in the list of beggars, Maḥmūd, the weary hearted, may be mentioned.
