= Kayalpatnam =

Town in Tamil Nadu, India

Kayalpattinam
- Nickname: Little Makkah
- Location in Tamil Nadu, India Kayalpattinam (India)
- Coordinates: 8°33′59″N 78°6′59″E
- Country: India
- State: Tamil Nadu

Government
  - Body: Kayalpattinam Municipality

Area
  - Total: 12.5 km^{2} (4.8 sq mi)

Population (2011)
  - Total: 40,588
  - Density: 3,250/km^{2} (8,410/sq mi)
- Demonym(s): Kayalar, Kayalite

Languages
  - Official: Tamil
- Time zone: UTC+5:30 (IST)
- PIN: 628204
- Telephone code: 04639
- Vehicle registration: TN 92 (Thiruchendur RTO)
- Nearest city: Thoothukudi
- Sex ratio: 1000:1177 ♂/♀
- Literacy: 92.71%
- Lok Sabha constituency: Thoothukudi; Formerly with Tiruchendur
- Vidhan Sabha constituency: Tiruchendur
- Civic Agency: Kayalpattinam Municipality
- Climate: Humid (Köppen)

Kayalpatnam (also known as Kayal) is a town in the Thoothukudi district of the Indian state of Tamil Nadu. Kayalpatnam (also spelled Kayalpattinam) is a historic coastal town in the Thoothukudi district of Tamil Nadu, India. It is known for its centuries-old maritime trade history, Islamic heritage, Hindu temples (mandirs) and unique cultural identity. According to the 2011 census, it has a population of 40,588.

== History ==
Kayalpatnam is mentioned in the travel diaries of Marco Polo in 1298 AD. Korkai, Vaguthai, or Kayal was an ancient port in the early Common Era and existed alongside Kollam, another important Pandyan port. While Kollam served the Pandyas on the west coast, Korkai/Kayal on the east coast connected to Ceylon, as well as the pearl fisheries in the Gulf of Mannar. Arab traders from Egypt and Yemen arrived at the port of Korkai (present-day Kayalpatnam), with some later migrating to Adirampattinam. There was considerable trading between Kayalpatnam, Adirampattinam, and Kilakarai, and this ancient port also traded with Egypt, Rome, and Greece.

The Muslim Moroccan explorer Ibn Battuta mentioned Kayalpatnam (which he refers to as Fatan) in his travelogue The Rihla (lit. "Journey"). There also exists a strong cultural connection between Kayalpatnam, Adirampattinam and Kilakarai.

Kayalpatnam is home to several mosques, one of which was visited by photographer Benoy Behl in his film, A World of Beauty and Grace: Islamic Architecture of India.

== Role In the Indian Independence Movement ==
Kayalpatnam, a part of Tiruchendur Taluk, was influential in the Indian independence movement. Many patriots from Kayalpatnam participated in the Civil Disobedience Movement, the Individual Satyagraha, and the Quit India Movement.

Toddy shop picketing holds significant historical importance in Kayalpatnam. In 1930, Mahatma Gandhi presented a set of Eleven Demands to the British Viceroy, Lord Irwin, addressing key economic and social grievances of the Indian people. These demands included the abolition of the salt tax, reduction of land revenue, and prohibition of intoxicating drinks. Inspired by Gandhi’s call for prohibition, toddy shops operating in Kayalpatnam were picketed.

== Freedom fighters from Kayalpatnam ==
Several individuals from Kayalpatnam participated in activities associated with the Indian independence movement.

One of them was L. K. Sheikh Muhammed, who participated in various Satyagraha campaigns, including toddy shop picketing. He was locally known as “Kayal Gandhi”. Sources describe his involvement in Gandhian movements during the period of the Indian freedom struggle. According to published accounts, he declined the freedom fighters' pension offered by the government.

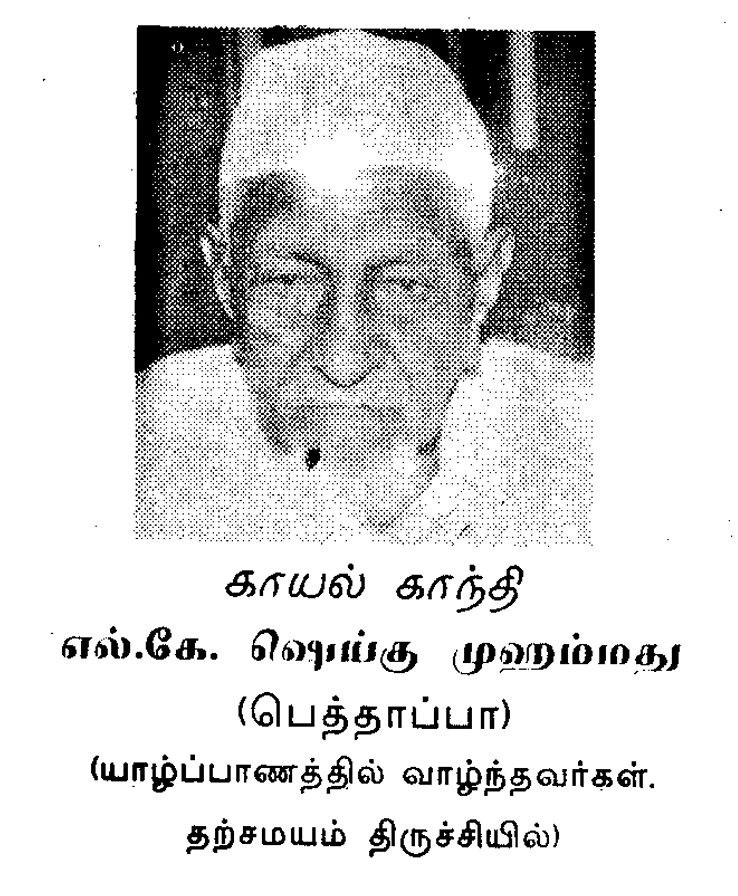
L. K. Sheikh Muhammed, also known locally as “Kayal Gandhi”.

Another participant in the freedom movement from Kayalpatnam was R. Venkatrama Mudaliar, who served as the Karnam (Hereditary Village Accountant) of Kayalpatnam. He resigned from this position during the Civil Disobedience Movement of 1932 and participated in toddy shop picketing at Kayalpatnam, along with other activists. For this, Venkatraman was arrested and prosecuted under the Prevention of Molestation and Boycotting Ordinance, 1932 (Ordinance V of 1932), as well as Section 17(1) of the Indian Criminal Law Amendment Act, 1908, for being a member of the Tirunelveli District Congress Committee, which was declared an Unlawful Association on 07 Jan 1932. In Criminal Case No. 81 of 1932, the Sub-Divisional Magistrate of Tirunelveli sentenced him a year of Rigorous Imprisonment, on 28 June 1932. He was held at Kokkirakulam sub-jail as an under-trial prisoner for four months and later imprisoned at Tiruchirapalli Central Jail for a year, between 1932 and 1933. He was released on 3 May 1933, as per G.O MS No.1555 dated 2 May 1933.

He later participated in the Individual Satyagraha movement in 1941 from Tiruchendur.

During the Quit India Movement in 1942, Venkatraman was arrested by the Malabar Special Police during investigations related to the Kulasekarapattinam rioting case.

Local accounts also record his involvement in civic initiatives in Kayalpatnam, including efforts related to drinking water supply in the town. Venkatraman's name is included in inscriptions at the Tiruchendur Panchayat Union Office and the Tiruchendur Freedom Fighters Memorial Pillar, which list individuals from the Tiruchendur Taluk who participated in the independence movement.

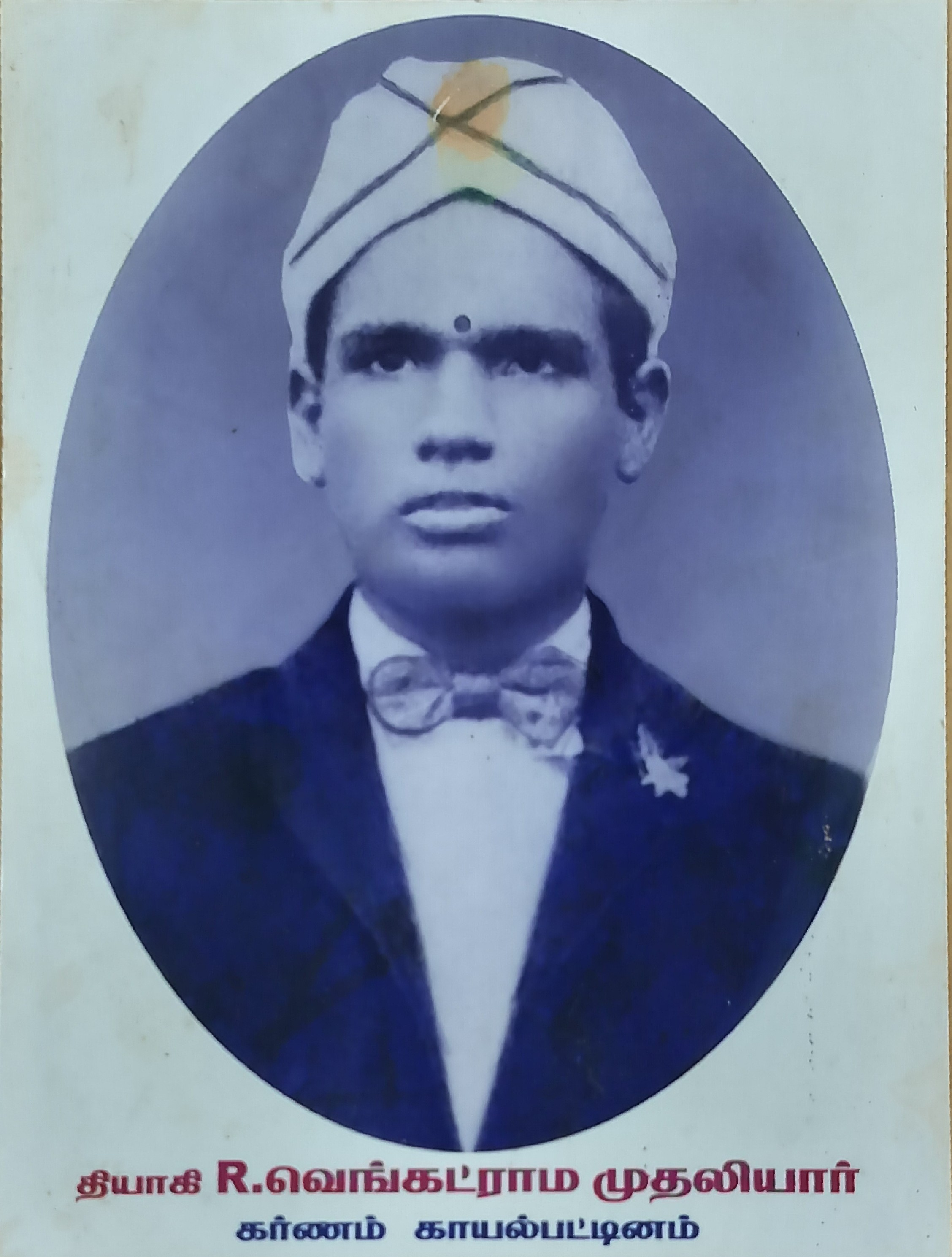
R. Venkatrama Mudaliar, Karnam of Kayalpatnam.

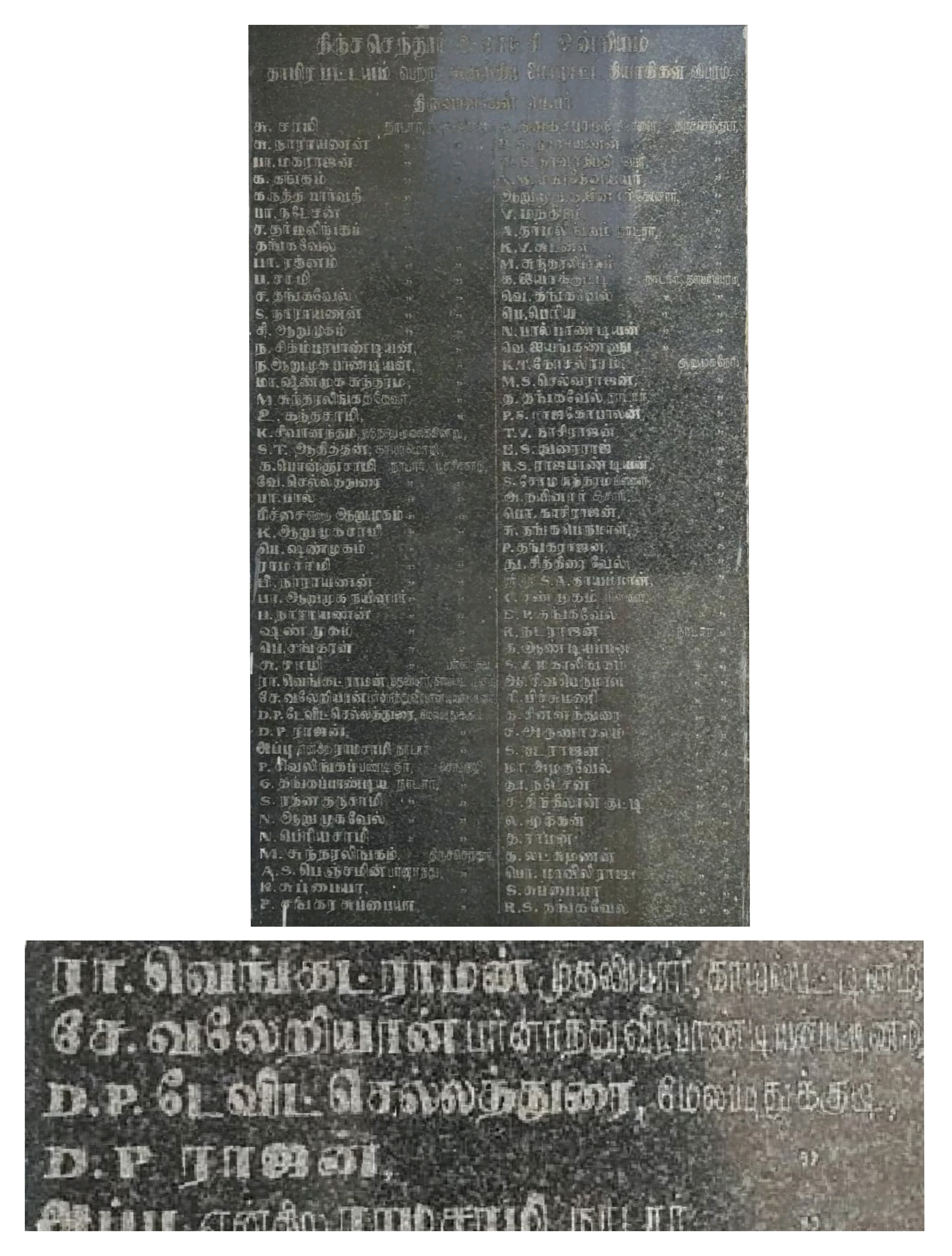
Inscription at the Tiruchendur Panchayat Union Office listing freedom fighters from Tiruchendur Taluk.

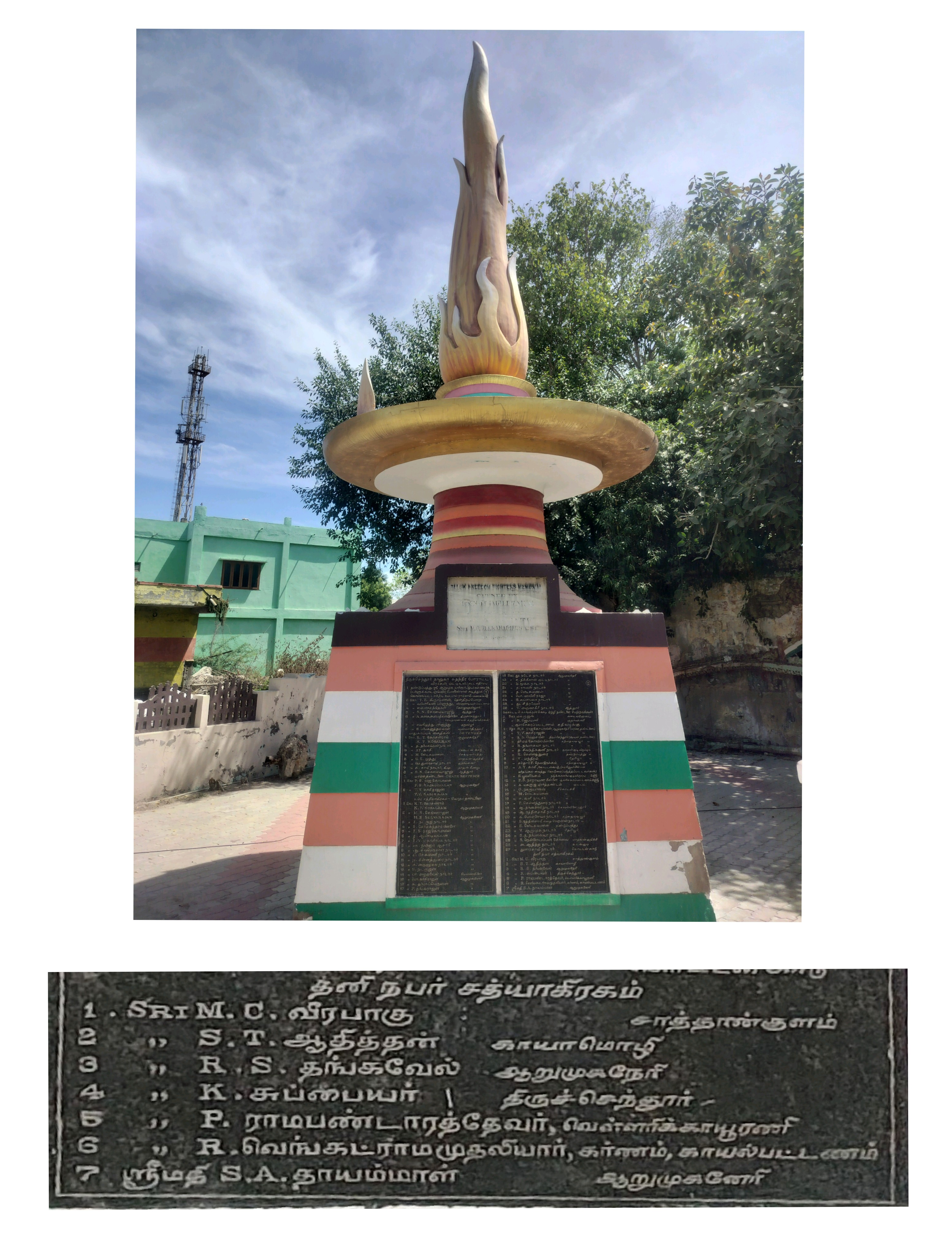
Tiruchendur Freedom Fighters Memorial Pillar inscription mentioning R. Venkatrama Mudaliar.

== Demographics ==
According to the 2011 census, Kayalpattinam has a population of 40,588 with a sex-ratio of 1,082 females for every 1,000 males, much above the national average of 929. A total of 4,995 were under the age of six, constituting 2,548 males and 2,447 females. Scheduled Castes and Scheduled Tribes accounted for 7.37% and .01% of the population respectively. The average literacy of the town was 81.3%, compared to the national average of 72.99%. The town had a total of 9,417 households. There were a total of 11,414 workers, comprising 17 cultivators, 27 main agricultural labourers, 206 in-house hold industries, 10,717 other workers, 447 marginal workers, 9 marginal cultivators, 4 marginal agricultural labourers, 30 marginal workers in household industries and 404 other marginal workers. Tamil is the predominant language, spoken by 99.72% of the population.

Religions in Kayalpattinam (2011)
Religion	Percent
Islam	67.24%
Hinduism	26.34%
Christianity	6.36%
Other or not stated	0.06%

Islam is the dominant religion in this municipality. According to the religious census of 2011, Kayalpattinam's population consisted of 26.34% Hindus, 67.24% Muslims, 6.36% Christians and 0.01% following other religions.

== Culture ==
Most Muslims in Kayalpattinam follow the Shafi'i school of thought along with the Qadiriyya and Shadhiliya Tariqa (Sufi order) Qadiriyya tariqa connected to Mahlara, and Shadhiliya tariqa connected to zaviya Faasiyatush shadhiliya Tariqa. The Indian headquarters of this tariqa, Zaviathul Fasiyathus shathulia, is located in Kayalpatnam. There are a few followers of Ahl-e-Hadith also present. There exists a Maqbara of Kazi Syed Alauddin, brother of Kazi Syed Tajuddin, the forefather of Madurai Maqbara Hazrats, and of all the Syeds living in Kazimar Street, Madurai is located here.

The Arwi dialect of Tamil was largely developed in Kayalpatnam.

The African Baobab tree has religious significance to the Hindus living in Kayal. At the Sri Isakki Amman Temple, locals believed that three goddesses lived in the tree branches. The tree at that temple was accidentally destroyed. In response, the Kayalpattinam Pathi movement was formed which seeks to protect and plant more Baobab trees.

In 2014, the Esakki Amman Temple roof was set on fire, causing damage to the temple. Following the fire, Hindu Munnani activists began to rebuild the roof. In response, Muslim residents protested the reconstruction of the temple. The local police believed it was an act of arson.

== Islamic educational institutions ==
- Al Madrasatul Fasiyyah
- Al Mahlarathul Qadhiriyyah
- Al Madrasatul Hamidhiyya
- Madrasathul Azhar li Thahfeezil Quraanil Kareem
- Da'wathul Huda
- Aroosul Jannah Women's Islamic College
- Ayisha Siddiqua Women's Islamic College
- Al Kulliyathun Nasuhiyya Women's Islamic College
- Muaskarur Rahman Women's Islamic College
- Muaskarur Rahman Hifz College for Women's
