= Yadava College =

College in Madurai, India

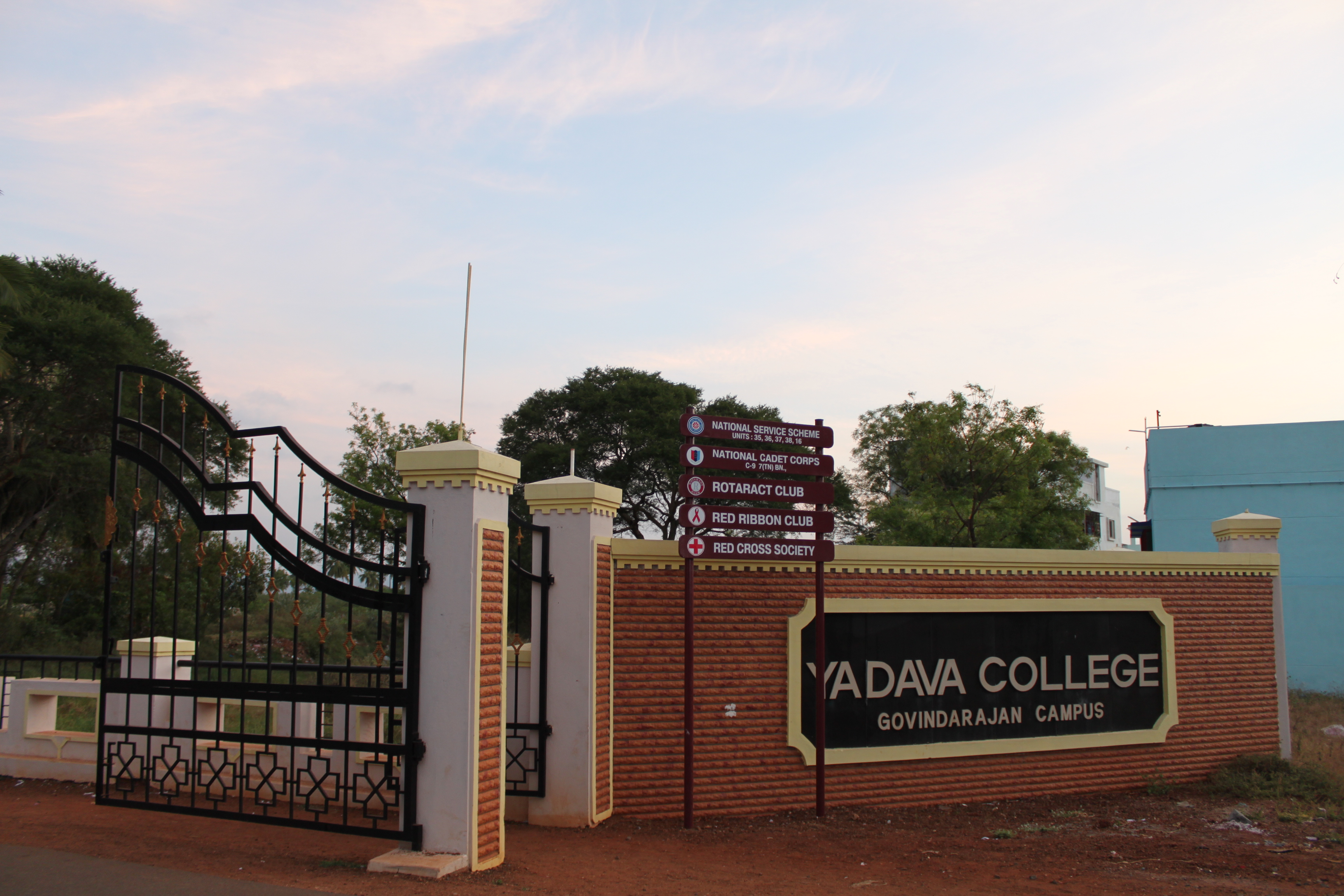
- Motto: Knowledge is wealth
- Type: Autonomous co-educational college
- Established: 1969
- Founders: Shri. E. Rengasamy; Shri. Govindarajan; Shri. D. Nagendran
- Principal: Dr. C. Raju
- Faculty: 149
- Administrative staff: 57
- Students: 2,912
- Location: Thiruppalai, Madurai, Tamil Nadu, 625014, India; 9°58′41″N 78°8′38″E
- Campus: 39.57 acres (160,100 m^{2})
- Website: http://www.yadavacollege.org/

Yadava College is an autonomous co-educational institution in Madurai, Tamil Nadu, India. It is affiliated with Madurai Kamaraj University and is located in Thiruppalai Madurai 14. The college was established in 1969 by the Yadava community, led by the late Shri. E. Rengasamy, the late Shri. Govindarajan and the late Shri. D. Nagendran.

== Description ==
The campus covers an area of 40 acres (0.16 km^{2}) with five blocks accommodating 13 departments of science, humanities, physical education, administrative office, principal's chamber, Dean's office, office of the controller of examination, auditorium, conference hall, computing centre, playground sports stadium, health club, language library, separate hostel for boys and girls, student counseling centre, career guidance cell and a well equipped library.

Yadava College has been accredited with "A" grade by the National Assessment and Accreditation Council and offers 13 undergraduate, seven postgraduate, three research degrees, and Certificate and Diploma programmes.

== Scholarships ==
Students with 90% attendance are eligible for the following scholarships.

- Indian government scholarship
- State government scholarship (backward classes)
- State government scholarship ([SC/ST] welfare)
- Fee concession as per Tamil Nadu Education rules 92
- National scholarships under Indian government
- Educational concessions for the wards of defense personnel
- National loan scholarship
- Indian government scholarship for the physically handicapped
- State level college educational scholarship
- Tamil Nadu educational endowment scholarship
- Physically handicapped educational scholarship
- scheduled Castes eligible prize amount
- State Government financial assistance for the wards of farmers

== Undergraduate courses ==
- B.A. Tamil
- B.A. History
- B.Sc. Mathematics
- B.Sc. Chemistry
- B.Sc. Physics
- B.Sc. Zoology
- B.Com.
- B.Sc. C.S.
- B.Sc. I.T.
- B.Sc. BioChemistry
- B.Sc. Microbiology
- B.Com.
- B.C.A.
- B.B.A.
- B.Sc. Software

== Postgraduate courses ==
- M.A. Tamil
- M.Sc. Zoology
- M.Com
- M.Sc. C.S.
- M.Sc. I.T.
- M.Sc. Mathematics
- M.Sc. Physics
- M.A. English

== Research ==
- M.Phil Tamil
- Ph.D Tamil
- M.Phil Commerce
- Ph.D Commerce
- M.Phil Zoology
- Ph.D Zoology

== Weekend courses ==
Weekend courses are offered through Bharathiar University.

- M.C.A. 3 year
- M.B.A. 2 year

== Library ==
The college library is a 5,600-square-foot (520 m^{2}) building. The library has 41,000 volumes, including 48 journals of different disciplines, a digital library which includes rare books and college magazines on CD, daily newspapers, magazines, a talking book library, and a back volume section. The library is fully computerized and has internet access for research and higher learning. There is an open online public access catalogue, a reprography section, audio visual facilities, and a language lab. The Reader's Forum is a group for readers from around the college. Dr.N.Vasanthakumar Headed the Library from 2010 to 2013.
