= Thiruppalai =

- Madurai Corporation
- Location in Tamil Nadu, India
- Coordinates: 9.9825°N 78.1430°E
- Country: India
- State: Tamil Nadu
- District: Madurai
- Local government: Madurai Corporation

Government
  - Type: municipal corporation
- Time zone: IST
- ZIP code: 625014

Thiruppalai is an area situated in the north of Madurai, Tamil Nadu, India. Parts of the village are included in Samayanallur constituency and Madurai constituency. In 2011, its village panchayat was dissolved and merged with Madurai Corporation. The main occupation of this village is farming but due to urbanization, some of the agricultural land is being sold for non-agricultural purposes.

== History ==
- As per earliest account of history, Thiruppalai village was purchased by Madurai Sultanate from then king Koon Pandiyan along with other five villages including Goripalayam Mosque.

== Educational institutions ==
- Yadava College
- E.M.G. Yadava Women's College
- Jain Vidyalaya Matriculation Hr. Sec. School
- Sri Ram Nallamani Teacher Training School
- Vellammal memorial matriculation school
- government Hr.sec school.

== Places of worship ==
- Thiruppalai Krishnan Temple, New Natham Road
- Iskcon Temple, New Natham Road
- Manthaiyamman Temple,
- sri thotichieamman Temple,(ayyakonar veera vagarai)
- Nondiswamy temple
- Nagarani Amman Temple
- Perumal Temple
- St. Peter's Church, CSI
- Thirupalai jumma mosque
