= Kazimar Street =

Ancient street in Madurai, India

Coordinates: 9°54′48″N 78°6′51″E

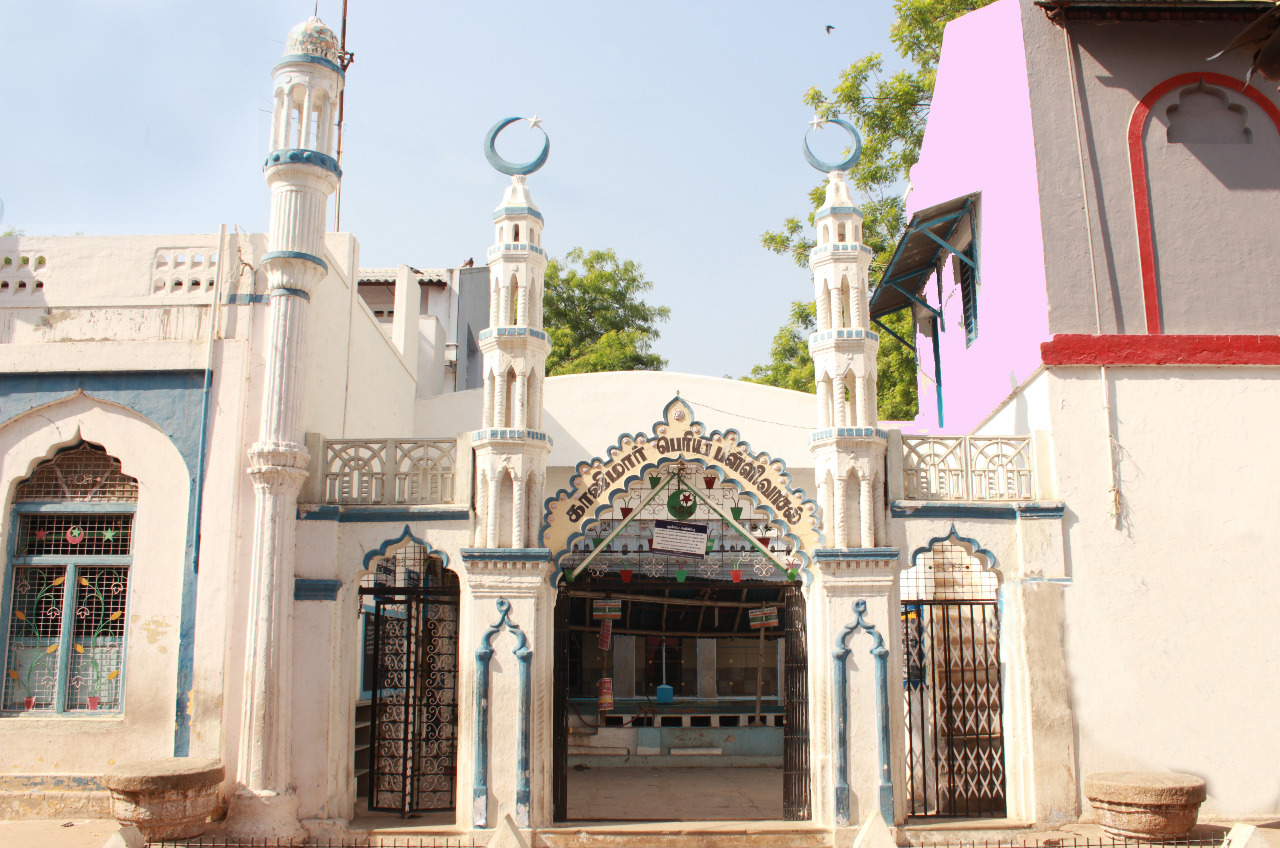
Kazimar Big Mosque at Kazimar Street, Madurai

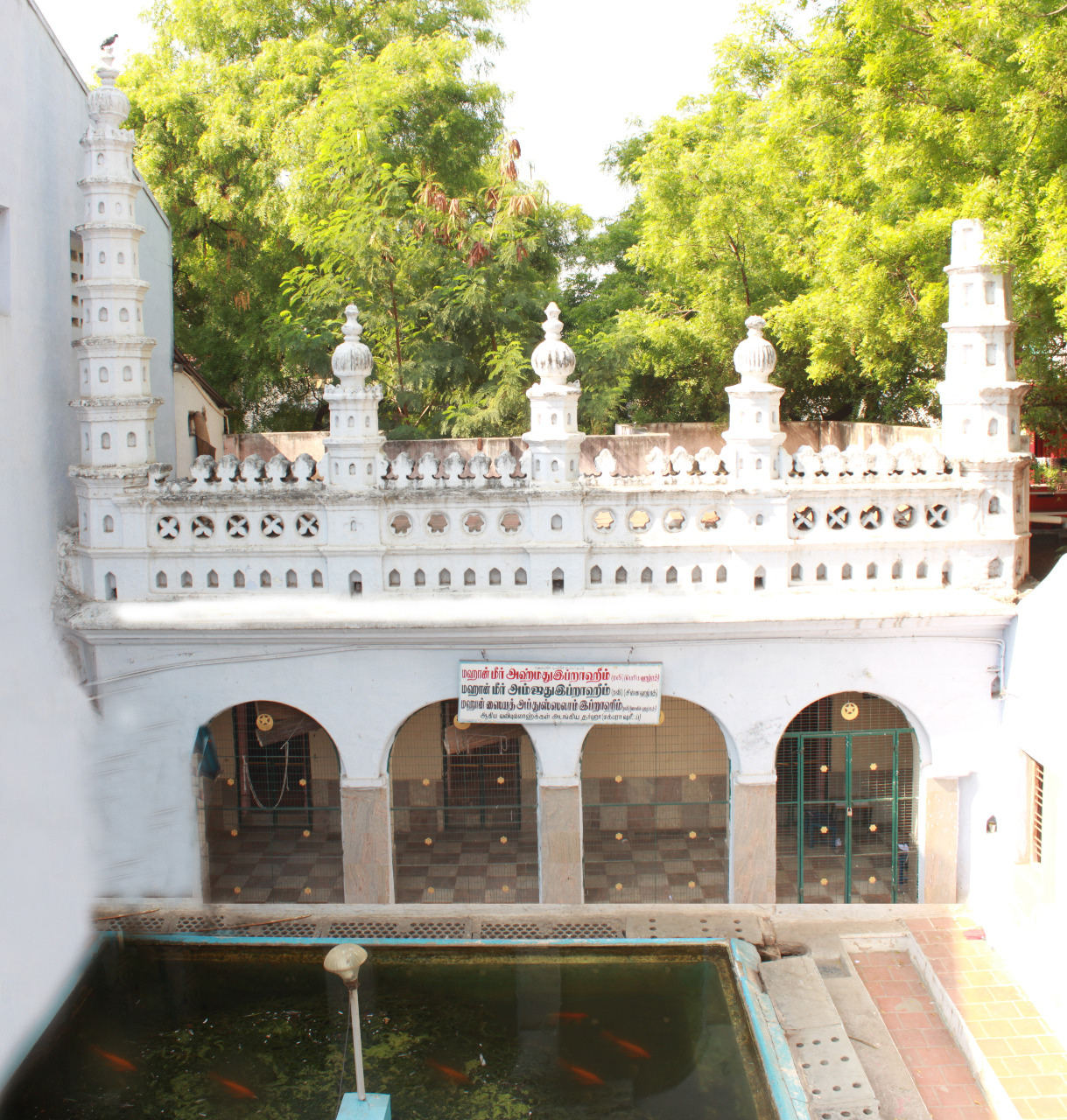
Madurai Hazrats' Maqbara inside the Kazimar Big Mosque at Kazimar Street, Madurai

Kazimar Street is an ancient street in Madurai, India, dating from the 13th century. Kazi Syed Tajuddin is the one who settled here after preaching Islam in South India. 99.2% population of this street are Muslims and 0.8% Hindus. The famous Kazimar periya pallivasal, which is the first Muslims' place of worship in madurai, Madurai Maqbara the dargah of famous Madurai Hazrats are located in this street.

== Descendants of Kazi Tajuddin ==
This is a street in India where around 400 families of descendants from a single common ancestor live in the same street for more than 800 years with deep matrimonial relationships within the families. This is believed to be a miracle of Kazi Syed Tajuddin who is the founder of Kazimar Big Mosque.

== See also ==
- Kazimar Big Mosque
- Madurai Maqbara
