= Sufi saint festivals =

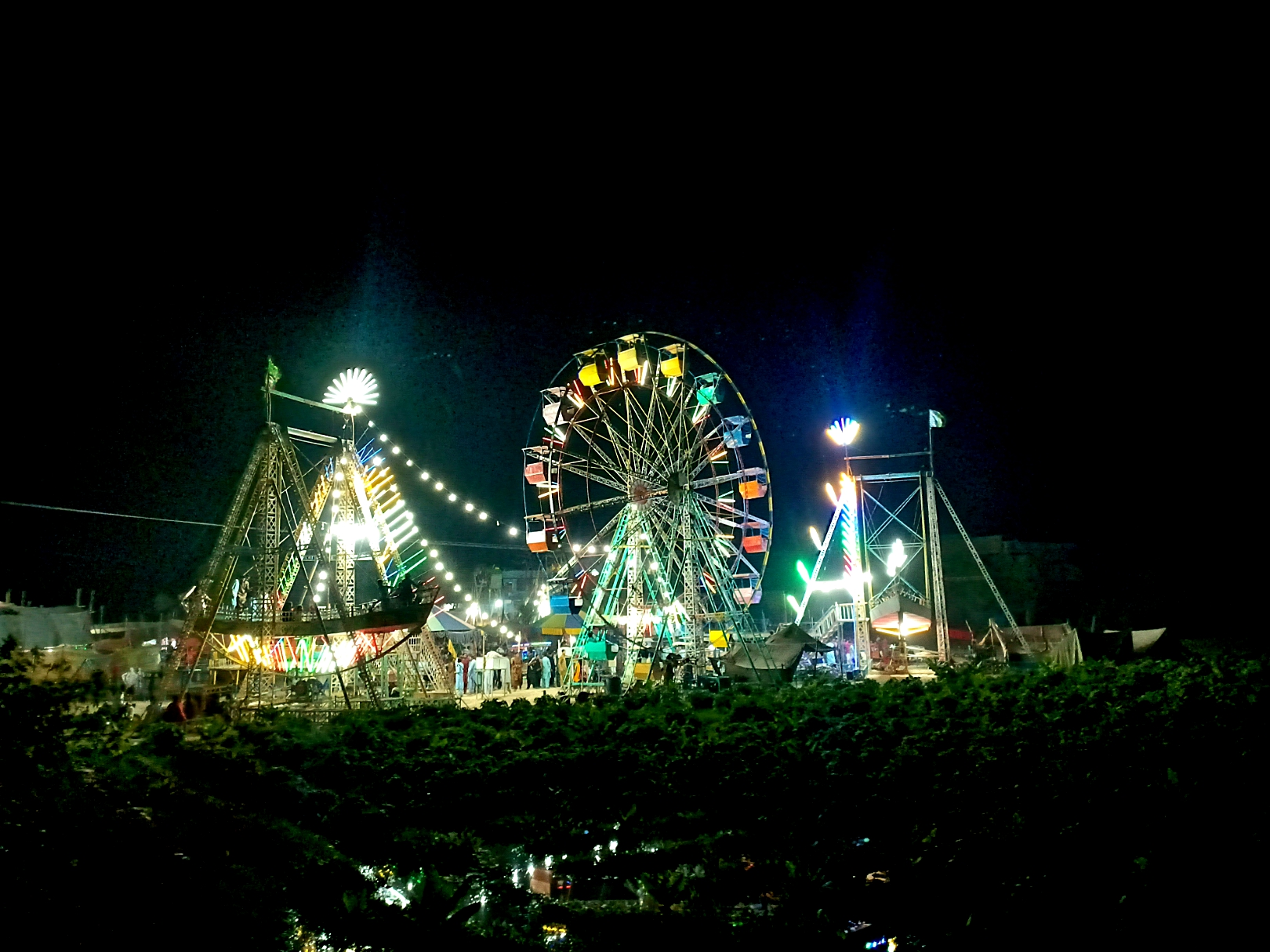
Festival night at Sufi saints death anniversary

Sufi saint festivals are celebrated in many parts of the Islamic world, going under a variety of different names. They commonly center around the shrine of a saint, especially a tomb shrine, and are celebrated on a date significant to the saint's life, such as the anniversary of their death or birth.

== Names ==
In Egypt and Sudan, these festivals are called mawlid, meaning birthday. This term is used because many of these festivals are celebrated on a saint's birthday, though the death day and other important occasions may also be the day of celebration. In South Asia, they are sometimes called urs or urus, meaning wedding. This is due to the prominent poetic and philosophical theme of "lover and Beloved" in Sufism, where God is a longed for beloved. The saints, as a result, are also called the lovers of God. In the Maghreb, they are often called moussem or mawsim, meaning season. They may also be called waada or raqb. The origin of the name waada comes from the word waad meaning "meeting" and "gathering". The name raqb indicates the pedestrian and equestrian procession of the murids (novices) from all sides towards the place of the customary or ritual festival. The term mawsim was also used in other regions of the Ottoman Empire.

They may also be called hawl, which made be related to one of the terms used in Sudan for these festivals (holiya or hawliya).

== Practice in different countries and regions ==
Not all Muslim countries commonly celebrate mawlids or urses. These festivals usually last for several days, with activities designated for particular days.

The practice of such festivals derives from Fatimid Egypt, where the birthdays of Mohammed, Ali, Fatima, Hassan, and Hussain became public holidays. While Shia in origin, Sunnis supported the holiday in hopes of combating the influence of other religions on newly converted populations and on uneducated Muslims. This support meant that even as Shia influence ebbed, these holidays remained popular and gradually gave rise to saint festivals. Sunni support also caused the holidays to spread far beyond their original region of celebration. Some of the lingering Shia influence can be seen in the use of tabut for certain saints, such as al-Jazuli, and local shaykhs (saints and venerated dead) in Egypt. In Egypt, these figures had tabut made and placed in their tombs. This could be placed over the grave in a tomb or stand as a representative for a grave located elsewhere. Every so often, these are taken out of the tomb and carried in a procession. They are often covered in cloth as decoration.

Occasionally, saint festivals have been promoted as equal to or substitutes for major pilgrimages, such as the pilgrimage to Mecca or Jerusalem (for Jewish festivals based on Sufi festivals). This was usually during times of severe political upheaval that made more significant pilgrimages difficult or impossible for fear of being killed as a civilian casualty of armed conflict. It is also a promotion usually limited to a specific group or a small number of groups, even if the shrine has broader appeal.

=== Bangladesh ===
Urs rituals are commonly preformed by the shrine custodians. Qawwalis and public meditative prayers are performed at these.

Unfortunately, some Islamist groups threaten shrines into discontinuing aspects of the traditional festivities, such as singing and dancing.

=== Egypt ===
Mawlids are thought by some to have begun as an Egyptian tradition during the Fatimid Caliphate. They are a well established part of Egyptian folk religion, and millions of Egyptians- regardless of if they are formally affiliated with a Sufi Order or not- attend them each year.

All Muslim saints in Egypt have mawlids. Some Christian and Jewish figures, such as Mary and Moses, also have or had mawlids. The biggest mawlids, celebrated by the public across the country, are the ones for Muhammad, Hussain, and Seyyida Zeynab. The next largest are those originally associated with a specific Sufi order, but now seen as part of a broader folk culture, like the ones for Ahmad al Bedawi and Ibrahim al Desuqi. Both of these examples concern saints notably located in market towns and occur shortly after the cotton harvest. The founding Order takes part in these, but may be almost completely overshadowed by other participating groups. While all mawlids face government disapproval and ambivalence, these are the most accepted ones by the state, as they are massively popular.

The next most popular are those primarily associated with and celebrated by a specific order, with some public participation of locals where the shrine is located. This includes Sidi Salama ar-Radi of the Hamidiya Shadhiliya Order. When the mawlid is organized, the current head of the order will coordinate with the leads of the zawiyas (lodges) to organize. Sometimes the head of the order will command the heads to all show up at a centrally organized mawlid, and will prohibit celebrations of a mawlid held local to the zawiyas.

After the saints associated mainly woth specific orders are the saints whose mawlids are celebrated by specific families and locales. In this last case, Beoduins may socially signal that they splitting off into a new lineage section by not attending one of these when they previously had and are expected to be present.

At all of these types of mawlids, it is a necessary component to visit the tomb of the saint if at all possible. This custom is called ziyara. When it is not possible (such as if the saint or other religious figure was important in Egypt but died elsewhere or their tomb has been lost), sometimes people will congregate at a religious site that the saint or religious figure was said to have visited or lived at for some time. The shrine will be circumambulated and touched by the celebrants, as it is believed things the saint has touched or are otherwise connected to them will transfer baraka (holiness) to others. During this, people often recite the fatiha and ask the saint for aid, though the manner of asking is often very familiar and somewhat informal.

In parts of Upper Egypt, a custom similar to the Shia tazia is observed. Rather than being specific to Muharram, local shaykhs (saints and venerated dead) had tabut ("honor chests"- imitation funeral beirs) made and placed in their tombs. The spirits of such people sometimes struck people with illness to ensure one of these was constructed. This could be placed over the grave in a tomb or stand as a representative for a grave located elsewhere. Every so often, these are taken out of the tomb and carried in a procession. They are often covered in cloth as decoration.

Men, women, and children all participate in the mawlid, though women are sometimes restricted from entering certain tents or other areas.

While the mawlid lasts multiple days, sometimes up to a week, the majority of the activity takes place during the first three days and laila kabira (grand/big night). Processions of Sufis are a common custom, who will walk with banners and flags of their order while singing hymns. The streets for the procession msy be elaborately decorated with strings of lights, neon signage, flags of the country, decorative arches, and so on. Photos and portraits of the saint are sometimes used as decoration and sold for cheap as souvenirs.

Festivities may be led by the current head of the order (depending on how big the order is) or an appointed deputy. Dhikr and Quran readings are common religious activities during mawlid festivities. Food is often distributed, and both the giver and receiver are thought to gain baraka from it. Musicians are also hired for entertainment, and some people will rent a TV for the same purpose. At bigger mawlids, the entertainment will also include a secular fairground. The sense of competition between tents hosted by different zawiyas in the same order pushes them to secure more novel and high quality entertainment and refreshments, which helps draw in visitors and foster a cooperative spirit in the zawiyas.

The mawlids often both serve to draw in new members to the order and to renew the devotion of existing members. It shores up the connection between saint and devotee and makes it personal; the larger and older an order grows, the more crucial this is, as fewer members will have known the saint personally. They will be advertised, and a greater pressure is put on to make sure the order impresses itself and newcomers. In the 20th and 21st century, it is also an event some Sufis use to try and disprove the slanders they face from anti-Sufi Egyptians that scrutinize the potential presence of the "old ways" or otherwise supposed non-Islamic elements.

In the 19th and 20th century, the state began imposing control over Sufi orders (partially due to European influence), such as banning doctrines related to non-dualism (like ittihad) and limiting the amount of mawlids that could occur in a year. At one point it banned any new mawlids from being established as well.

=== India ===
Qawwalis are commonly recited at Indian urs festivals, which often take place in the complexes built around saint tombs (dargahs). Attendees are often fed from communal kitchens (langar).

Men and women both participate at festivals.

Participants may bring offerings like rose garlands and pieces of cloth to lay on the tomb. The tomb is also sometimes washed with rose water.

=== The Maghreb ===
As noted before, Sufi festivals ultimately derive from the early Shia celebrations of Muhammad and his family members birthdays. This was entwined with the background presence of the Idrisds, who practiced an early form of Hasan centered Shia Islam. Several Sufi saints from the Maghreb were Idrisds by blood. Such political presence lead to the idea of sharifism (thst spiritual and political authority derived from one being a descendant of Muhammad).

One of the early proponents of mawsim in the Maghreb was Ahmad al-Azafi. As with other Sunni proponents, he favored the adoption of the Mawlid for Muhammad to combat the common Andalusian practices of celebrating Christmas, Nowruz, and Mehrejan (Arabized Christians adopted this holiday as a commemoration of St. John the Baptist's birthday). He used the Maliki idea of public interest (maslaha) to justify the new practice, as it was an opportunity to raise spiritual consciousness. It was further spread by the Magiriyya Sufis along pilgrimage routes that lead through the rest of the Maghreb and into Egypt. Given the fact that these celebrations were originally about the Prophet's family and many Sufi saints claimed to be descendants of the Prophet, it is not surprising that Sufi mawsim followed.

In the Berber areas of the Maghreb, almost every village had its saint or marabout and a small domed tomb or mausoleum (qubba) of the same name. This feast or ritual of the marabout is celebrated once a year and worshipers come to it from places far away. Some marabout buildings are still being maintained and whitewashed with white paint every few years.

The religious practices relating to the mawsim are based on the tilawa (ritual recitation) of the complete and integral sixty hizbs of the Quran, the Sufi salka.

Collective catering around large couscous dishes is a central quality of these festivities in order to socialize people attending the mawsim around traditional culinary foods in addition to the recitation of the Quran, Dhikr and Qasidas.

The annual gathering of the descendants of the marabout in this festivity is an opportunity to strengthen family and tribal ties between these cousins, and also to establish family alliances with other siblings and tribes.

Group salah (prayer), collective tarteel, team tasting of dishes and couscous, choral singing of Al-Burda, appreciation of the artistic performances of fantasia, humming of poems and qasidas, as well as other activities, make mawsim a proven factor of social cohesion and individual appeasement.

A mawsim is sometimes accompanied by the equestrian games called Fantasias and other cultural peculiarities. Mawāsim and Fantasias include equestrian games as a tradition of regional pilgrimages linked to one another in Islamic times.

Many of the Algerian fantasia troupes perform horse exhibition shown several times a year in different cultural Mawāsim such as that of Sidi Ahmed al-Majzub in Naâma, the Horse celebration of Tiaret, or the Celebration of Sidi Yahia Bensafia in Tlemcen.

The most important Algerian mawsimis that of the oasis of Béni Abbès in the region of Bechar.

Tan-Tan Moussem is a traditional annual gathering of Berber tribes from the Maghreb in the southwest Moroccan town of Tan-Tan.

=== Pakistan ===
In Pakistan, the state has tried to nationalize the urs festival as a way of building identity. One of the most popular festivals is for the patron saint of Lahore, Hadhrat Syed Ali Bin Uthman al-Hujweri. Qawwalis are recited here too. The graves of the saints (dargah) may be covered in flowers by devotees.

Men, women, and children all participate, though some urs dedicate a day for women participants in particular.

Some Pakistanis allege that certain shrines and festivals have become associated with drug use.

=== Palestine ===
The mawsim at Nabi Musa in Jericho, one of the most important festivals for Muslim Palestinians, took place in spring, a season used for popular holidays since classical antiquity. During the festival, a soup kitchen would open to ensure all celebrants were fed. Female musicians and equestrians were sometimes invited to entertain the celebrants.

The celebration was disrupted in the 20th century due to the shrine falling under the control of the Jordanian and Israeli governments. As it has since come back under Palestinian control, and activity at the shrine has started to increase.

=== Sudan ===
Dhikr is a prominent part of Sufi mawlids, which are organized around the tombs of saints (maqam).

In addition to annual mawlids, some Sudanese Sufis meet weekly at the shrines of local saints. These gatherings mostly center on dhikr with musical accompaniment.

== Influence on other religions ==
Many Jews in Morocco or descended from Moroccans celebrate similar saint festivals. Such saint veneration practices may heavily overlap with prophet veneration, such as at the tomb of Ezekiel in Iraq (which has also been influenced by Shia customs). Jewish saint and prophet festivals were also popular in medieval Egypt, though they are not common today.

Historically, different religious groups in Islamicate areas shared shrines, with Jews and Christians going to Muslim shrines and vice versa. This likely aided the bleed in religious concepts, with Jews venerating saints and prophets in ways ultimately similar to Muslims. The reason for Shia influence at some Iraqi Jewish shrines certainly comes from this, as Jews affiliated with the shrines would have witnessed or heard about the Muhurram processions that stopped at some of their shrines.
