= Madurai Maqbara =

Three Sufi shrines in the Kazimar Big Mosque, Madurai, Tamil Nadu, India

- மதுரை மக்பரா
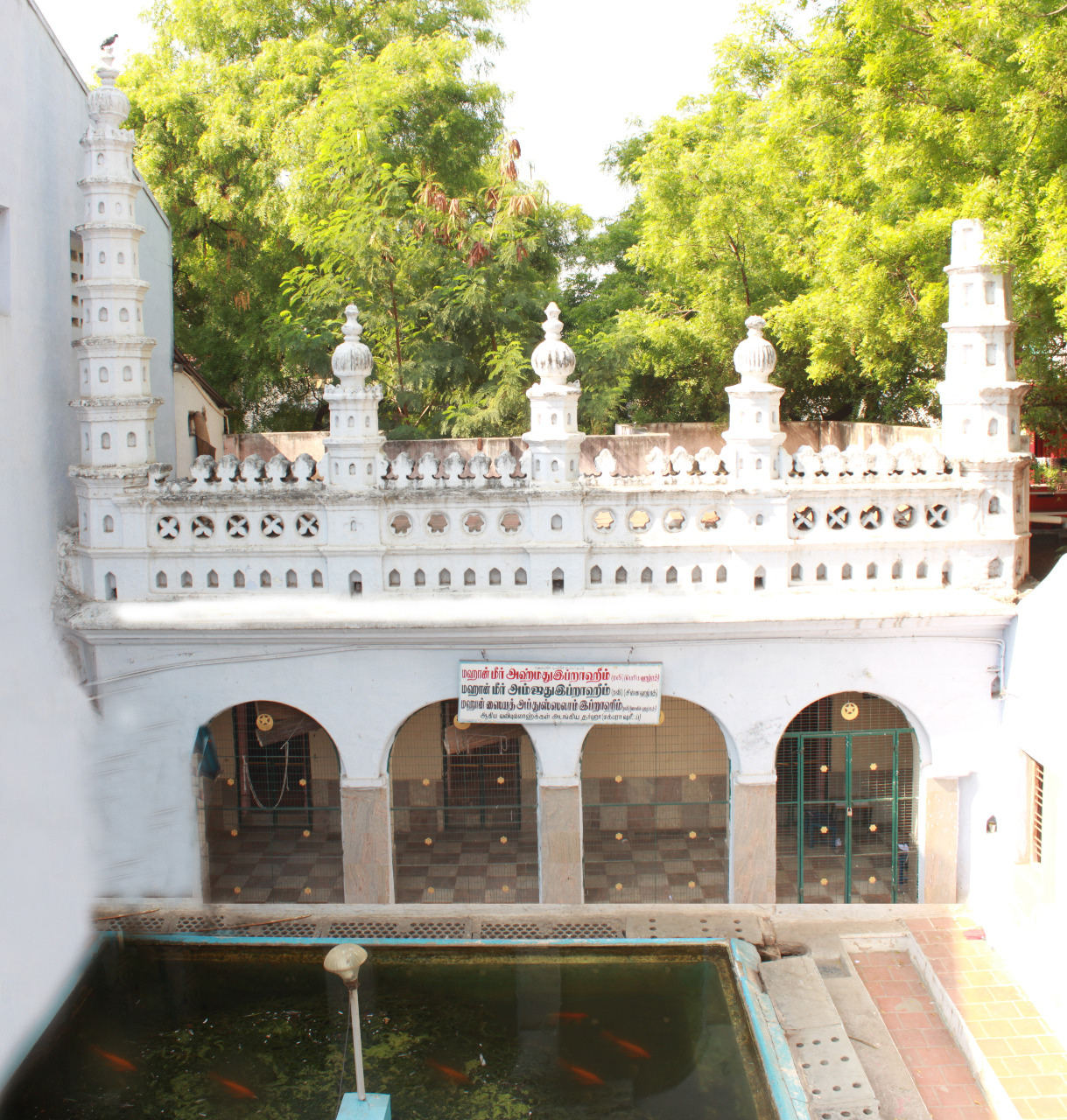
- Maqbara of the Madurai Hazrats located inside the Kazimar periya pallivasal campus

- Location of the dargah in Tamil Nadu

Religion
- Affiliation: Sunni Islam
- Rite: Sufism
- Ecclesiastical or organizational status: Dargah; Maqbara
- Status: Active

Location
- Location: Madurai, Madurai district, Tamil Nadu
- Country: India
- Interactive map of Madurai Maqbara
- Coordinates: 9°54′47″N 78°06′50″E

Architecture
- Type: Mosque architecture
- Style: Indo-Islamic

Specifications
- Minaret: Two (maybe more)
- Shrines: Three: Mir Ahmad Ibrahim; Mir Amjad Ibrahim; Abdus Salaam Ibrahim

Website
- maqbara.com

The Madurai Maqbara (Tamil: மதுரை மக்பரா; Arabic: مدهر مقبرة) is a dargah complex that contains the mausoleums of three Sufi saints: Mir Ahmad Ibrahim, Mir Amjad Ibrahim, and Abdus Salaam Ibrahim; and is situated in Kazimar Big Mosque, Madurai, in the state of Tamil Nadu, India.

The Arabic, the word maqbara means mausoleum, and is derived from the word qabr, meaning grave. Though maqbara refers to the graves of all Muslims, it refers especially to the graves (Raula or Rauza) of religious figures or Waliyullahs who dedicated their life to Islam, striving to be true Muslims and training others to follow Islam as first preached by the Islamic prophet Muhammad.

== Overview ==
In Madurai, in southern Tamil Nadu, there are many dargahs of Waliyullahs, but the term "Madurai Maqbara" generally refers to the dargahs of three saints: Mir Ahmad Ibrahim, Mir Amjad Ibrahim, and Abdus Salaam Ibrahim located in the Kazimar Big Mosque premises. The birth of these three Waliyullahs was declared by Hazrat Nabi Sulaiman, the messenger of Allah, and a genie called Jaimur was deployed by Hazrat Sulaiman to serve them. The place where these three sheikhs' graves are found is in the premises of Kazimar Big Mosque (also known as Periya Pallivasal), in the heart of Madurai.

Periya is a Tamil word that in means elder or big, and Arabic: كبير, romanized: Kabeer. Similarly, Chinna is a Tamil word which translates to younger or small in English, and Arabic: صغير, romanized: Sagheer. Hence, Meer Ahmed Ibrahim is called Elder Hazrat (حضرت ال كبير) and Meer Amjad Ibrahim is called Younger Hazrat (حضرت ال الصغير).

== Biography of the saints ==
=== Meer Ahamed Ibrahim ===
Meer Ahamed Ibrahim, born as Periya Hazrat, was said to be a miracle. Hazrat’s father Moulana Mir ni’amatullah did not have a child for many years after his marriage. One day his wife had a dream. Sultan Syed Ibrahim Shahid badusha of Erwadi appeared and asked her to come to Erwadi for ziyarat to have offspring. Moulana Meer Ahmedh Ibrahim was born three years later with the blessings of Sulthan Syed Ibrahim shaheed.

Meer Ahamed Ibrahim left his home for a madarasa to pursue education; however, he was among the slow learners in his class. One day his teacher scolded him for being a poor student. The teacher also insisted Meer Ahmad Ibrahim leave the madrassa the very next morning, as the teacher found him unfit. Periya Hazrat was very sad about this and was worried what could he do after going home. He went to bed with deep sadness after praying to Allah.

That night Periya Hazrat had a dream. A mass of people were running, and Periya Hazrat asked where they were going. People replied as they are going to see Allah's Tajalli. Periya Hazrat joined them. When they reached a place, at the top of a small hill, Allah's Tajalli was glittering very gloriously and everyone there enjoyed it. A voice came toward Moulana Meer Ahamed Ibrahim saying what you wished for is given. It was early morning and time for Fajr prayers when Hazrat woke up. Now Periya Hazrat’s teacher asked him again to leave the madharasa. He added, "Yesterday I told you to go, because you were unfit to learn, but today I need you to leave the madarasa as I am not qualified enough to teach you." This is how Moulana Meer Ahamed Ibrahim became educated.

Periya Hazrat returned to his home town Madurai and started a madrassa to educate Tamil Nadu Muslims. Many scholars of Islam in Tamil Nadu were Periya Hazrat’s students, and those scholars in turn started madrassas all over Tamil Nadu. For his outstanding wisdom and expertise in the Islamic Fiqh laws, Mir Ahamadh Ibrahim was appointed as the government chief Kazi of Madurai and Kaziul Kuzaat by the then Nawab of Carnatic in India. He served excellently with Khilafatship and Kaziship and added Glory to Islam in Madurai and other parts of Tamil Nadu.

Periya Hazrat died in 1872 CE, at the age of 63, leaving four sons (Saajid Alaihir Rahma, Qadi Syed Abdul Qadir Ibrahim, Syed Mahmood Ahmad Ibrahim, Contractor Hazrat, constructor of Maqbara and Saqi Meer Niyamatullah Ibrahim) and a daughter, Saalima, wife Saalim Hazrat.

=== Meer Amjad Ibrahim ===
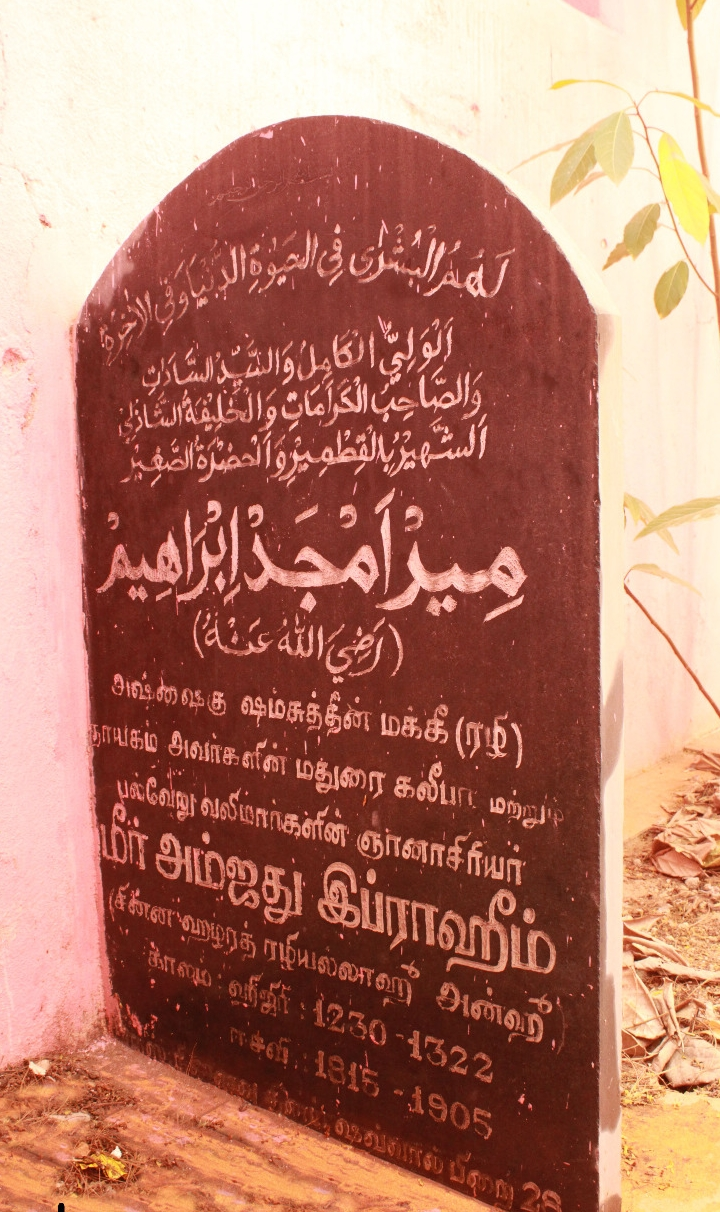
The plaque mounted on the grave of Chinna Hazrat

Right from his birth and during childhood days, Chinna Hazrat was Almighty fearing and was along with his brother Periya Hazrat in spreading Islamic education to the students from all over southern Tamil Nadu. There were a lot of followers (muhibs) of these Hazrats in a nearby locality called Nelpettai Pattaraikaara street belonging to sungam Pallivasal on the southern bank of river Vaigai. Chinna Hazrat used to go to this area to educate these people. One fine day, Chinna Hazrat was walking and reciting some tasbeeh at the bank of river Vaigai after giving them a lecture after Asar. Suddenly, a stunning creature appeared before him. The creature asked Chinna Hazrat to open his mouth, and hazrat did so. Suddenly He spat on Hazrat's mouth. Chinna Hazrat asked, "Who are you brother?" The reply was "I am Qizar, and you just swallow it." Right after this incident Chinna Hazrat was in extreme to his wilayat.

Once, a mureed of Chinna Hazrat in Sri Lanka was struggling to breathe, as some food got struck in his vocal cords while eating. Suddenly he shouted, "Yaa Sheikh, help me!" Within a few seconds, Chinna Hazrat could make his presence there in Sri Lanka to help him. It took some few months for that Mureed to come to Madurai and thank hazrat for his timely help.

Also, Khalwat Nayagam, who belonged to a traditional family in Keelakarai, Ramanathapuram District, had a wish of going to Sri Lanka for his business. His Father, Imaam Al Aroos, Maappilai Lebbai Aalim, advised his son to go to Madurai, to seek blessings from the Madurai Hazrats who are descendants (Awlads) of Muhammad, before leaving for business. Khalwat Nayagam, came to Madurai and met Meer Amjad Ibrahim and sought blessings for his business trip. Chinna Hazrat told, "You are not the one will go to Sri Lanka for business, instead you will sit inside a dark room" Listening to these words from Hazrat, Khalwat Nayagam started to Keelakarai. On his way back, he was in a dilemma and before reaching home, his mind changed and finally he concluded by sitting in Khalwah for his entire lifetime. This is only because of the words of Chinna Hazrat.

Chinna Hazrat died at the age of 95 leaving his only son, Saalim Hazrat, and a daughter who was married to Moulana Syed Khaja Mueenuddeen Sahib.

=== Syed Abdus Salaam Ibrahim ===
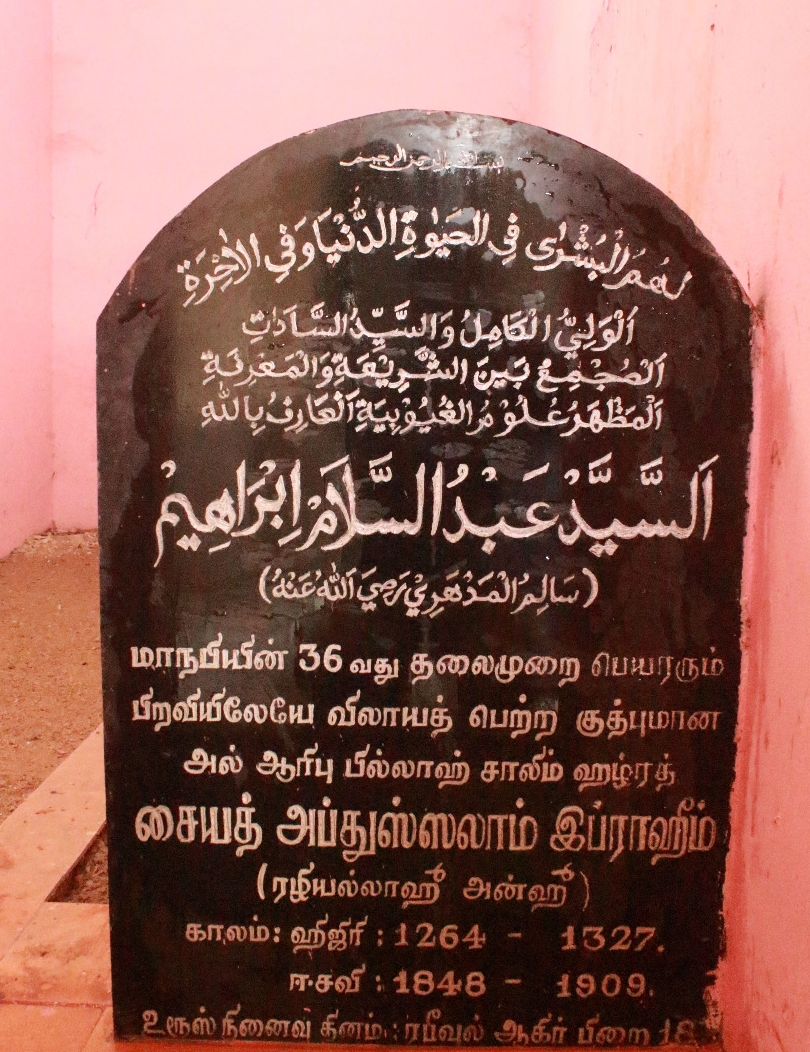
The plaque mounted on the grave of Saalim Hazrat

The elder son of Chinna Hazrat was Abdus Salaam Ibrahim (Saalim Hazrat) whose birth itself was said to be a miracle. He was very tiny: half the size of a sparrow. Physicians said that the child would not live but, to their wonder, he grew gigantic. He was very much God-fearing right from his childhood days. Once, he was watching a procession which was heading towards a nearby temple with all fun and some music. Muhammad appeared and said, "This is not the objective for which you are born." Realizing the mistake Saalim Hazrat went home. Saalim Hazrat was brought up in an Islamic environment by His father Meer Amjad Ibrahim Hazrat and he was a waliyullah from his birth.

One day while Saalim hazrat was performing ablution in the premises of Kazimar Big Mosque, a veiled lady appeared before him, and started reciting a Qasida Anaz zehra Fatimatul Batooli, which means "I am Fatimah, The Zehra and Batool." Saalim Hazrat believed that it could be either a jinn or Shaitan cheating him, and claiming to be his grand mother Fatimah. knowing this, Bibi Fatimah, at the end of that Qasida recited these lines. Ana bintur Rasooli wa lastu jinna. Wa ainal jinnu wash shaitaanu minnaانا بنت الرسول و لست جننا و اينل جن والشيطان منا, which means "I am the daughter of the Prophet and not Jinn (as you doubted), Jinn and Shaitan surely can't take our shapes, and they can't be from us." Realizing the truth, Saalim Hazrat memorised that Qasidah and its still being recited through by people who love Ahl al-Bayt.

Similarly, Hazrat Imam Ali Akbar son of Hazrat Imam Husain the third imam of the twelvers appeared before Saalim hazrat who is one of the descendants of his sibling Imam Zaynul Aabideen, and recited a Qasida which starts as Lanaa fi Jannatil Ulyaa maqaamu لنا في جنث العليا مقام which means "For us (Karbala Martyrs) There are Very Higher status in Heaven." This Qasida is also read in some parts of Tamil Nadu.

It was 1297 hijri, 13th of Zil Hijjah Saalim hazrat, after completing his Dhuhr prayer was waiting for lunch in his home. Suddenly, a saint with a dark green turban arrived on a large Arabian horse, who was found to be Sultan Syed Ibrahim Shaheed of Erwadi dargah. Sulthan Syed Ibrahim Shaheed recited a Qasida starting as Wa laula ballu saifi bid Dimaa'i, Layab Qal Hindu Kulluhu Fil 'Amaa'ii و لولا بل سيفي بالدماء* ليبقى الهند كله في العماء which means "Had been my sword not soaked in the bloods, this land of India would have gone dark" and completed it with 25 couplets. This was accomplished in three consecutive days.

Also, Shahul Hameed Abdul Qadir of Nagore had also appeared before Saalim waliyullah and recited a Qasida which starts as كراماتنا تجري علا كلي عالم Karaamaatuna Tajri ala kulli 'aalami which means Our miracles (Wonders) are wide spread all over the universe.

Like his grandfather Hazrat Mir Niamatullah, Saalim waliyullah did not have a child for a very long time after his marriage. He composed a lot of bait begging Erwadi Sulthan Syed Ibrahim Shaheed's wasila for a child. Finally, after some 12 years, he had two children: Syed Amjad Ibrahim and Syed Muhammad Shamsuddin Ibrahim. The later died in childhood.

=== Maqbara Hazrats and Fassiyatush Shadhiliyya ===
Meer Ahmed Ibrahim who was chief Kazi to the government at that time, accepted this Tariqa, became its Khalifatul Khulafa appointed by Imama Fassi and started flourishing it. After the death of Periya Hazrat, his brother Meer Amjad Ibrahim became the Khalifa of Fassiyatush Shadhiliyyah. He was appointed by Shamsuddin Muhammad Al Makki Al Fassi. Abdus Salaam Ibrahim Saalim accepted this tariqa only after getting consent from Muhammad. Saalim Hazrat got Bai'at (vow) from Sheikh Muhammad Saalih Moulana and embraced shadhiliyya. During the period of these three Waliyullahs and Khalifaas after them, Fassiyatush Shadhiliyya Sufi order started flourishing in various parts of Tamil Nadu, Kerala and in Sri Lanka.

== Gallery ==
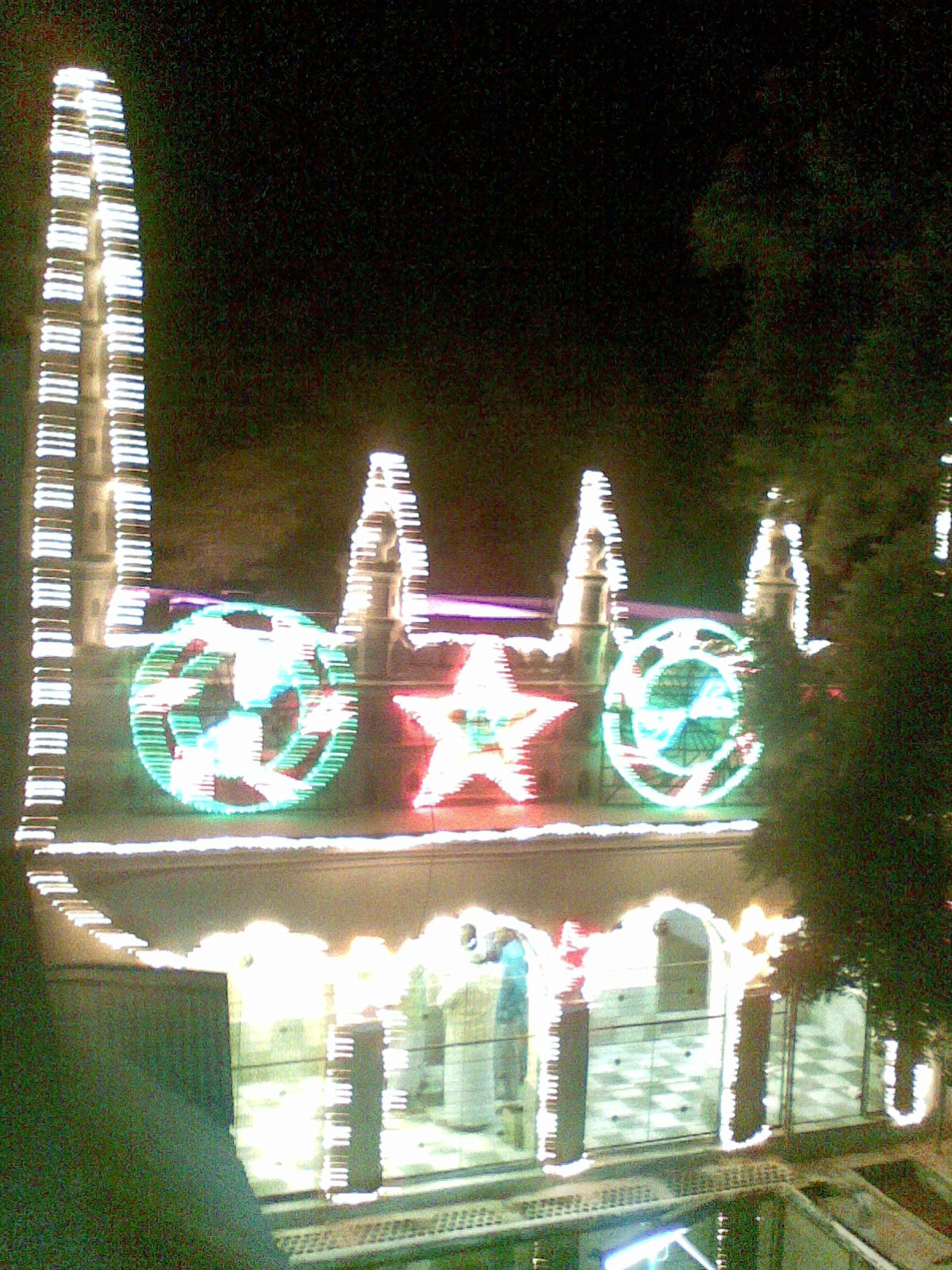
Pilgrims thronging Maqbara on the Ramzan-13 Urs of Periya Hazrat

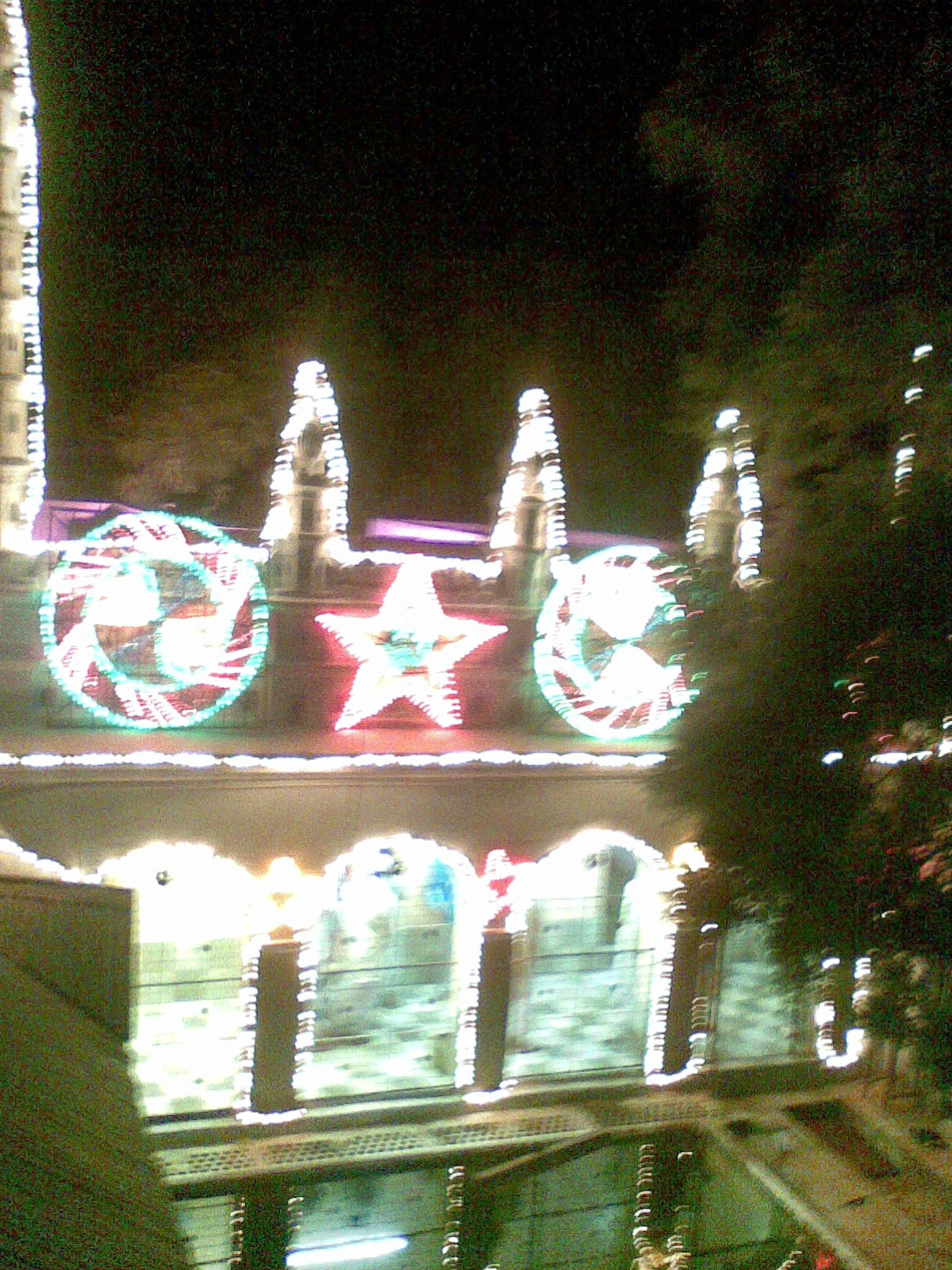
Decorated with lighting

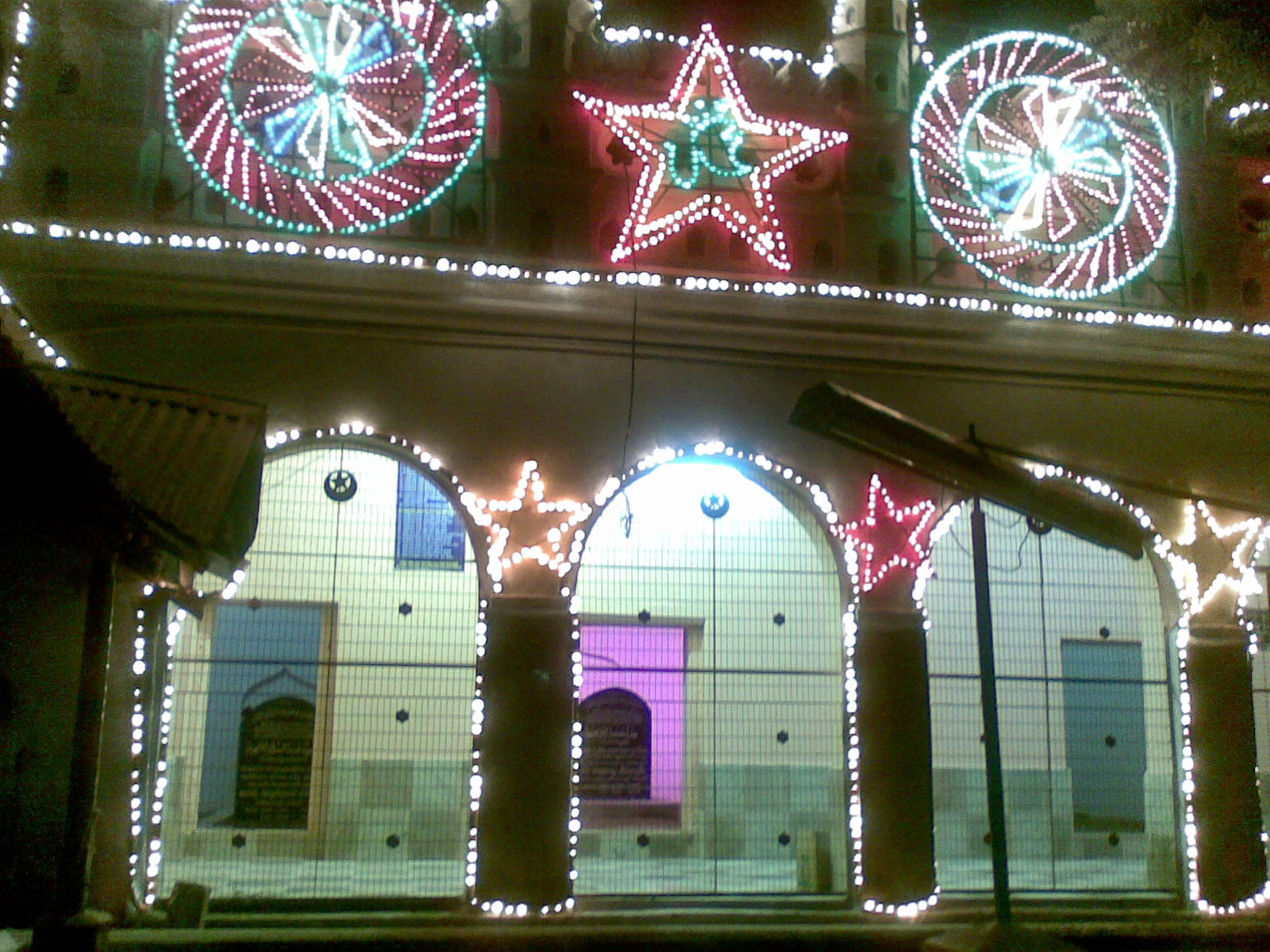
View of the mosque with plaques

== See also ==
- Islam in India
- List of Islamic shrines in Tamil Nadu
- List of mosques in India
