= Rauza =

Perso-Arabic term for shrine or tomb

Rauza, Rouza, Roza (Urdu: روضة, Bengali: রৌজা, Hindi: रौज़ा) is a Perso-Arabic term used in the Middle East and Indian subcontinent which means shrine or tomb. It is also known as mazār, maqbara or dargah.

The word rauza is derived through Persian from the Arabic rawdah (روضة rawḍah) meaning garden, but extended to tomb surrounded by garden as at Agra and Aurangabad. Abdul Hamid Lahauri, the author of the Badshahnama, the official history of Shah Jahan's reign, calls Taj Mahal rauza-i munawwara (Perso-Arabic: روضه منواره rawdah-i munawwarah), meaning the illumined or illustrious tomb in a garden.
