= Urs =

Death anniversary of a Sufi saint

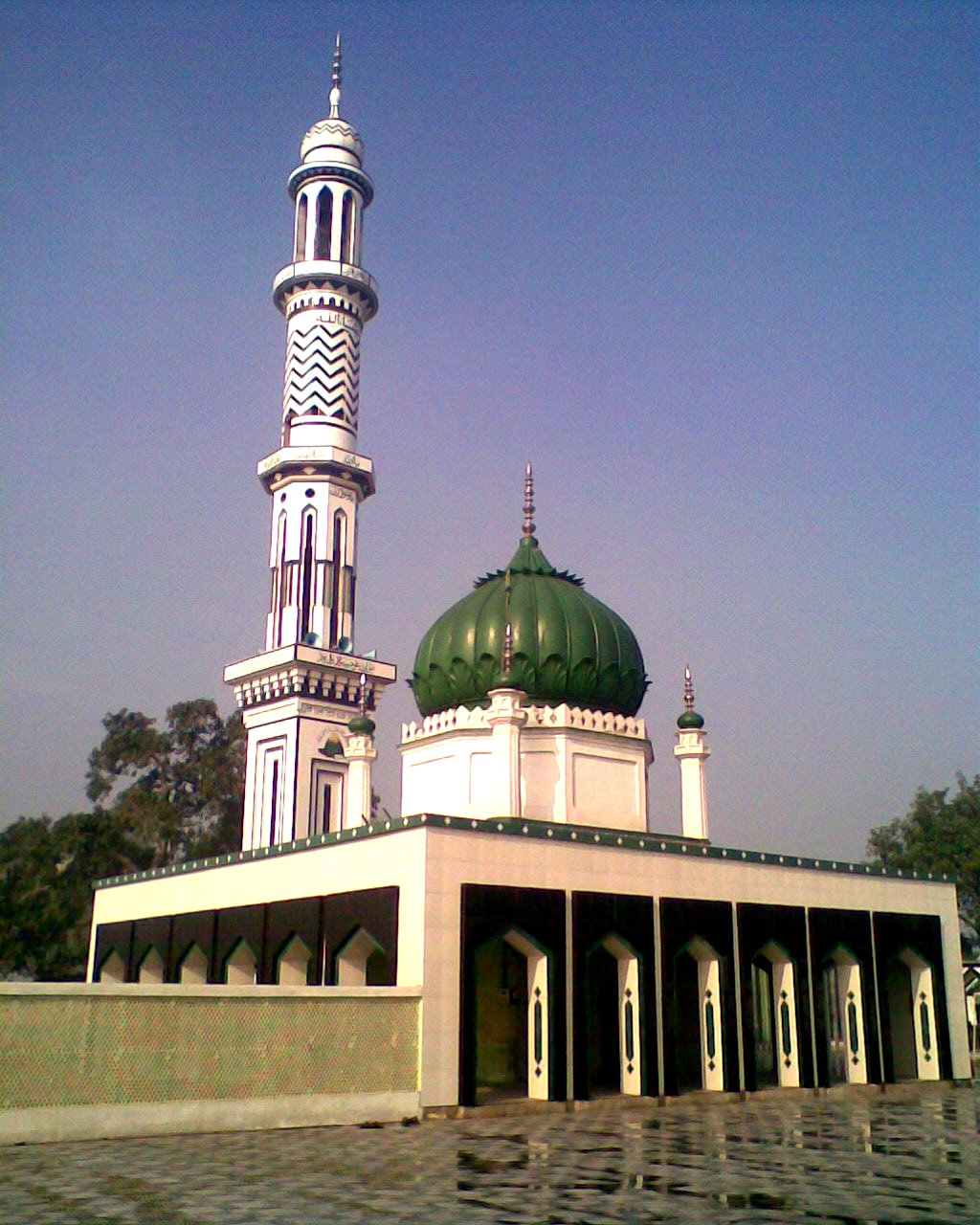
Urs of Islamic Naqshbandi saints of Allo Mahar is celebrated on 23 March every year

Urs (from Urdu: عرس ‘Urs) or Urus (literal meaning wedding in Arabic), is the death anniversary of a Sufi saint, usually held at the saint's dargah (shrine or tomb). In most Sufi orders such as Naqshbandiyyah, Suhrawardiyya, Chishtiyya, Qadiriyya, etc. the concept of Urs exists and is celebrated with enthusiasm. The devotees refer to their saints as lovers of God, the beloved. In some countries this can also be celebrated on the saint's birthday. It may be called a mawlid as well, regardless of if it is tied to the death day, birthday, or even another day significant to the saint. The term mawlid is preferred in Egypt and Sudan. In the Maghreb these are called moussem. These Sufi saint festivals are very popular among the public.

Urs rituals are generally performed by the custodians of the shrine or the existing Shaikh of the silsila. The celebration of Urs ranges from Hamd to Naat and in many cases includes the singing of religious music such as qawwali. The celebration also features food samples, bazaar, and various kinds of shops.

The Urs of Khwaja Moinuddin Chishti at Dargah Sharif in Ajmer attracts more than 400,000 devotees each year and is regarded as one of the most famous urs festivals around the world.

== Name ==
Urs or Urus is derived from the word for wedding due to the prominent poetic and philosophical theme of "lover and Beloved" in Sufism, where God is a longed for beloved. The saints, as a result, are also called the lovers of God.

Mawlid, on the other hand, translates directly to birthday. It is also used to refer to celebrations of the Prophet Muhammad's birthday, which in countries where "mawlid" is a common term for Sufi festivals, will be specified as "Mawlid el Nabi".

== Practice in different countries ==
Not all Muslim countries commonly celebrate mawlids or urses.

=== Egypt ===
Mawlids are thought by some to have begun as an Egyptian tradition during the Fatimid Caliphate. They are a well established part of Egyptian folk religion, and millions of Egyptians- regardless of if they are formally affiliated with a Sufi Order or not- attend them each year.

All Muslim saints in Egypt have mawlids. Some Christian and Jewish figures, such as Mary and Moses, also have or had mawlids. The biggest mawlids, celebrated by the public across the country, are the ones for Muhammad, Hussain, and Seyyida Zeynab. The next largest are those originally associated with a specific Sufi order, but now seen as part of a broader folk culture, like the ones for Ahmad al Bedawi and Ibrahim al Desuqi. Both of these examples concern saints notably located in market towns and occur shortly after the cotton harvest. The founding Order takes part in these, but may be almost completely overshadowed by other participating groups. While all mawlids face government disapproval and ambivalence, these are the most accepted ones by the state, as they are massively popular.

The next most popular are those primarily associated with and celebrated by a specific order, with some public participation of locals where the shrine is located. This includes Sidi Salama ar-Radi of the Hamidiya Shadhiliya Order. After this are the saints whose mawlids are celebrated by specific families and locales. In this last case, Beoduins may socially signal that they splitting off into a new lineage section by not attending one of these when they previously had and are expected to be present.

At all of these types of mawlids, it is a necessary component to visit the tomb of the saint if at all possible. This custom is called ziyara. When it is not possible (such as if the saint or other religious figure was important in Egypt but died elsewhere or their tomb has been lost), sometimes people will congregate at a religious site that the saint or religious figure was said to have visited or lived at for some time. The shrine will be circumambulated and touched by the celebrants, as it is believed things the saint has touched or are otherwise connected to them will transfer baraka (holiness) to others. During this, people often recite the fatiha and ask the saint for aid, though the manner of asking is often very familiar and somewhat informal.

== See also ==
- Erwadi
- Tirupparankunram
- Manamadurai
- Pir Mangho Urs
- Urs (Ajmer)
- Madurai Maqbara
- Mela Chiraghan
- Beemapally
- Sufi Barkat Ali
- Shah Abdul Latif Bhittai
