= Maqbara =

Islamic mausoleum

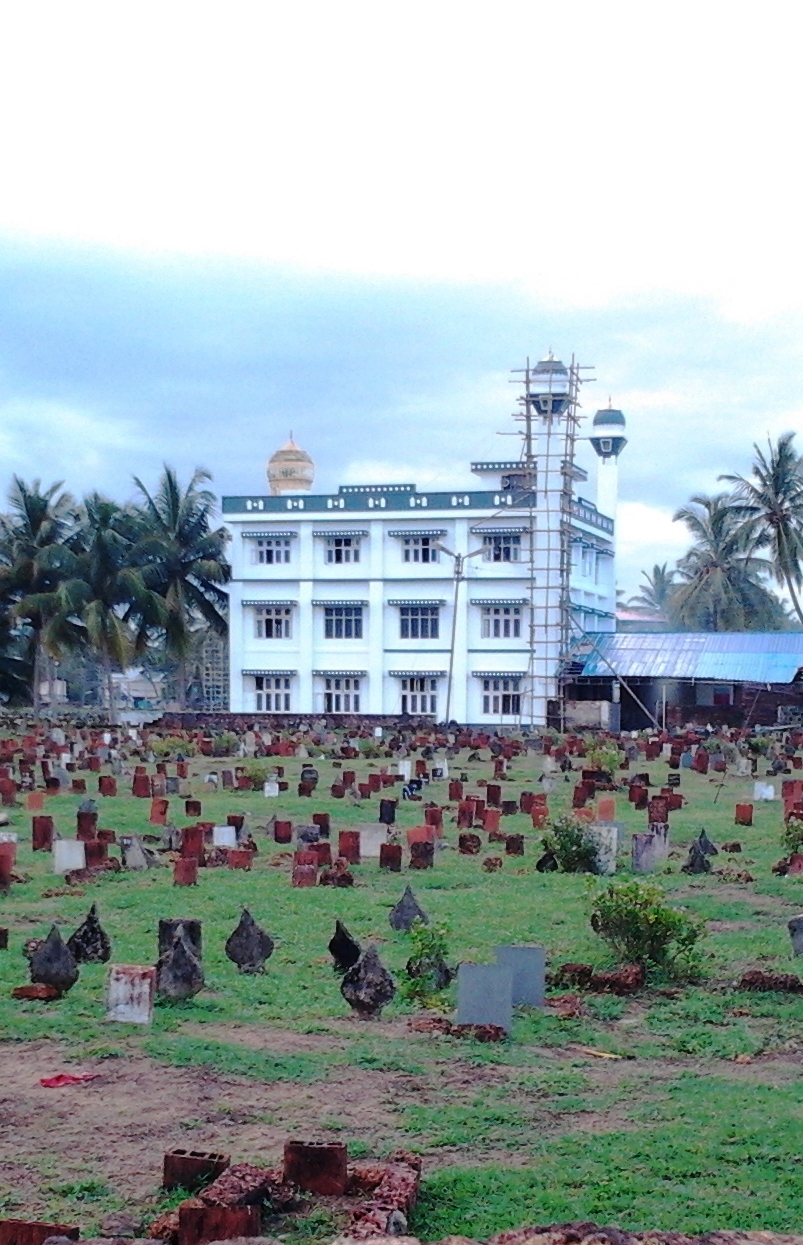
Kannam Parambu Maqbarah in Kozhikode

The Arabic word maqbara (مقبرة المسلمين "mausoleum"; plural: مقابر maqâbir) is derived from the word qabr, which means grave. Though maqbara refers to the graves of all Muslims, it refers especially to a Muslim cemetery. In some Islamic cultures (especially Indo-Pak-influenced) it refers also to the graves (raula or rauza) of religious figures or Waliyullahs considered to have dedicated their life to Islam, striving to be true Muslims and training others to follow Islam as preached by the Islamic prophet Muhammad.

In Asian countries, maqbara also refers to the dargah of Waliyullahs, Sufis, Sheikhs, Imams, Qutbs and Ghouses. There are many dargahs of Waliyullahs all over India, and their maqbaras are found therein.

== Notable maqbara ==
=== Egypt ===
- Al-Rifa'i Mosque
- City of the Dead

=== Saudi Arabia ===
- Al-Baqi Cemetery
- Jannat al-Mu'alla
- Al Oud cemetery

=== India ===
- Madurai Maqbara

=== United States ===
- Assyrian Muslim Cemetery

== See also ==
- Khwaja Khizr Tomb
- List of Islamic shrines in Tamil Nadu
- Maqam (shrine)
