= Khalifa (disambiguation) =

Khalifa is an Arabic name or title which means "successor", "deputy" or "steward".

- Caliph, the ruler of a Caliphate
- Khalifa (Morocco), a high official in the Sultanate of Morocco

Khalifa may also refer to:

== Arts, entertainment, and media ==
- Khalifa (film), a 1976 Bollywood film
- Khalifa (album), a 2016 album by Wiz Khalifa
- Khalifa, a 2026 Malayalam film by Vysakh

== Buildings ==
- Burj Khalifa, a supertall skyscraper in Dubai, United Arab Emirates, currently the tallest building in the world
- Khalifa International Stadium, a multi-purpose stadium in Doha, Qatar

== People ==
- Al Khalifa (House of Khalifa), the royal family of Bahrain
- Khalifa (mansa), the fourth mansa of the Mali Empire
- Khalifa ibn Khayyat (c. 777 – c. 854), Arab historian
- Khalifa Keita (r. 1274–1275), fourth mansa of the Mali Empire
- Katip Çelebi, or Hajji Khalifa, (1599–1658), Ottoman-Turkish author
- Khalifa Alqattan (1934–2003), Kuwaiti pioneer artist
- Khalifa Cohen (died 1932), Tunisian rabbi
- Abdallahi ibn Muhammad (1846–1899), known as "The Khalifa", Sudanese Mahdist leader
- Khalifa bin Harub of Zanzibar (1879–1960), sultan of Zanzibar
- Sirr Al-Khatim Al-Khalifa (1919–2006), Sudanese politician
- Khalifa bin Hamad Al Thani (1932–2016), Emir of Qatar (r. 1972–1995)
- Rashad Khalifa (1935–1990), Egyptian biochemist
- Saber Khalifa (born 1986), Tunisian footballer
- Khalifa bin Zayed Al Nahyan (1948–2022), Emir of Abu Dhabi and UAE president
- Mohammed Jamal Khalifa (1957–2007), Saudi Arabian businessman
- Nassim Ben Khalifa (born 1992), Swiss footballer of Tunisian descent
- Abdel Qawi Khalifa, Egyptian engineer and academic
- Khalif Libasse Diouf (born 1989), American rapper also known as Le1f
- Khalifa Haftar (born 1943), Libyan military commander
- Hamad bin Khalifa Al Thani (born 1952), former Emir of Qatar (r. 1995–2013)
- Haya Rashed Al-Khalifa (born 1952), President of the 61st United Nations General Assembly
- Marcel Khalife (born 1950), Lebanese musician
- Peter Khalife (born 1990), Lebanese football agent
- Omer Khalifa (born 1956), Sudanese sportsman
- Rafik Khalifa (born 1966), Algerian billionaire
- Sarah Khalifa (born 1994), Egyptian businesswoman, entrepreneur and criminal
- Osama Khalifa (born 1995), Egyptian squash player
- Mia Khalifa (born 1993), adult film-star
- Lina Khalifeh (born 1986), Jordanian black belt taekwondo champion and activist against sexual harassment in Jordan
- Wiz Khalifa (born 1987), American rapper

== Places ==
- Khalifa City, a residential suburb in Abu Dhabi, United Arab Emirates
- Khalifa Port, a port in Abu Dhabi, United Arab Emirates
- Khalifa Point, Balochistan, Pakistan, a town
- Xəlfəlikənd, Lerik, Azerbaijan, a village
- Khalifeh (disambiguation), multiple places in Iran

== Other uses ==
- Khalifa Airways, a former Algerian company
- Khalifa (caste), a Muslim group based in Gujarat, India

== See also ==
- Khalifah (film), a 2011 Indonesian film by Nurman Hakim
- Khalifah ibn Khayyat (777–854), Arab historian
- Kalifa (disambiguation)
- Caliph (disambiguation)
