= Khalifeh =

Khalifeh (Persian: خليفه) may refer to:

- Lina Khalifeh (born 1986), Jordanian black belt taekwondo champion and activist against sexual harassment in Jordan
- Khalifeh, Dashtestan, Bushehr Province
- Khalifeh, Ganaveh, Bushehr Province
- Khalifeh, Chaharmahal and Bakhtiari
- Khalifeh Kandi (disambiguation), places in East Azerbaijan
- Khalifeh, Kermanshah
- Khalifeh Bapir, Kermanshah Province
- Khalifeh, Khuzestan
- Khalifeh, Kohgiluyeh and Boyer-Ahmad
- Khalifeh Torkhan, Kurdistan Province
- Khalifeh, Lorestan
- Khalifeh, West Azerbaijan
- Khalifeh, Zanjan

== See also ==
- Khalifeh Kandi (disambiguation)
- Khalifehi (disambiguation)
- Mal-e Khalifeh
- Qaleh Khalifeh (disambiguation)
