= Ahamed Muhyudheen Noorishah Jeelani =

Chishtiyya - Nooriya Sufi order mystic

Sheikh Noor-Ul Mashaikh Sayyid Ahmad Muhiuddin Jeelani Noori Shah (R.A)
- حضرة سيد أحمد محي الدين نوري شاه الجيلاني
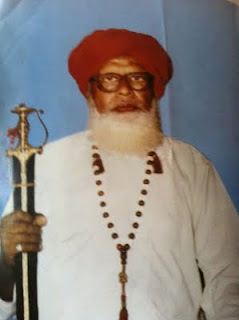

Personal life
- Born: 08 October 1915 Dabeerpura, India, Hyderabad
- Died: 03 November 1990 (aged −74–75) Noori Maskan, Hyderabad, India
- Resting place: Rouza E Nooria, Bait-ul Arif, Noori Maskan, Noori Nagar, Hyderabad
- Other names: Noor Ul Mashaikh, Hazrat Noori Shah Jilani, Qutbuzaman

Religious life
- Religion: Islam
- Denomination: Sunni
- Jurisprudence: Hanafi
- Tariqa: Chishti Qadiri Order
- Creed: Maturidi
- Profession: Islamic preacher

Muslim leader
- Influenced by: Muhammad, Abdul Qadir Jilani, Moinuddin Chishti, Qutbuddin Bakhtiar Kaki, Nizamuddin Auliya, Nasiruddin Chiragh Dehlavi, Bande Nawaz, Mahmoodullah Shah, Machiliwale Shah, Ghousi Shah, Ibn Arabi, Maulana Rumi, Ḥāmid b. Faḍlallāh Jamālī,
- Influenced: Sheikh Quthbul Mashaikh Syed Muhammed Arifudheen Noorullah Shah Jeelani, Sheikh Muballighul Ihsan Wa Musahhihu Ta'aleemath Zuhoori Shah Noori, Sheikh Noorul Ulama Ibraheem Khaleelullah Shah Noori, Sheikh Khwaja Dil Nawaz Faizee Shah Noori, Sheikh Khwaja Faqeer Nawaz Kaleemi Shah Noori, Sheikh Jamali Shah Noori, Sheikh Syed Nizami Shah Noori, Sheikh Yaqoob Ali Shah Noori, Sheikh Muhibbi Shah Noori, Ahmed Raza Khan Barelvi, Deobandism, and virtually all subsequent mystics of the Chishtiyya orderall shia muslims and Sunni Muslims, Barelvi movement and all Sufis

Sayyid Ahmed Muhiuddin Jeelani Arabic: (حضرة سيد أحمد محي الدين نوري شاه الجيلاني), popularly known as Noor-ul-Mashaikh or NooriShah Jeelani, was a Sufi mystic, orator, faqeeh, theologian, mujaddid and Islamic scholar of the Qadri–Chishti Order order from the Indian subcontinent. He was a claimed 21st-generation descendant of Abdul Qadir Jilani, the founder of the Qadiriyya order.

He was the eponymous founder of the Silsila Nooria tariqa (Sufi order) which is a sub-branch of Qadiriyya and Chistiyya in India.

His silsila has spread throughout the world influencing millions in more than 40 countries through thousands of his disciples (murid), many gatherings, mosques, Islamic schools, colleges, hospitals and general humanitarian services to society. He was the founder of Kerala’s first Islamic Arabic college Jamia Nooriyya Arabic College, Pattikkad in Malappuram District of Kerala. He accepted the position of vice president of the Jamia Nooriyya Arabic College. NooriShah Jeelani was a disciple (murid) of the Sufi saint Ghousi Shah whose spiritual master's lineage of predecessors goes to Machiliwale Shah and Mahmoodullah Shah of Hyderabad. His spiritual chain (Tariqa) connects to masters such as Bande Nawaz, Nasiruddin Chiragh Dehlavi, Nizamuddin Auliya, Qutbuddin Bakhtiar Kaki, Moinuddin Chishti of Chishti Order as well as masters such as Abdul Qadir Gilani, Junayd of Baghdad, Sari al-Saqati, Ma'ruf al-Karkhi of Qadiri order.

Sheikh NooriShah Jeelani received the title of Caliph (or religious successors) from his spiritual teacher Sheikh Kanzul Irfan Moulana Ghousi Shah of Hyderabad, India after years of spiritual training under his guidance. His ʿUrs (anniversary of death) is celebrated on 14th day of month Rabiʽ al-Thani (Islamic calendar). His mausoleum (or tomb) Dargah is located in very well known place called Noori Maskan of Noori Nagar in the Bandlaguda area of Hyderabad, Telangana, India.

While Sheikh NooriShah Jeelani had millions of disciples (students or murids), few of them were given Caliph and made Khalifa (or religious successors) of his religious spiritual chain and continued to spread the beliefs of Sufism and spirituality. Among his senior Khalifa (or religious successors) who later became very well acclaimed and most renowned Sufi Saints in the Indian Sub-continent include Sheikh Syed Arifudheen Jeelani Noorullah Shah Noori, Sheikh Syed Muneeruddin Jeelani Kamalullah Shah Noori, Sheikh Syed Nasiruddin Jeelani Asrarullah Shah Noori, Sheikh Yousuf Zuhoori Shah Noori, Khwaja Dil Nawaz Faizee Shah Noori, Khwaja Faqeer Nawaz Aamir Kaleemi Shah Noori, Sheikh Jamali Shah Noori, Sheikh Noorul Ulama Ibraheem Musliyar Khaleelullah Shah Noori, Sheikh Muhibbi Shah Noori, Sheikh Yaqoob Ali Shah Noori, Sheikh Syed Aziz Ali Shah Noori (mamujaan) among others. These Sufi saints later spread their knowledge across more than 20 different countries mainly in the Indian Sub-continent, Middle East and South East Asian countries.

Silsila-e-Nooria

The present Janasheen Silsila-e-Nooriya and Sajjada Nasheen Rouza-e-Nooria Sheikh ShamsUl Mashaikh Syed Ahmad Muhiuddin Jeelani Noori Shah Saani (Damat Barakatuhum), (Sajjada Nasheen E Silsila E Nooria & Sajjada Nasheen Rouza-e-Nooria wa Rouza-e-Arifia ) He is 23rd generation of Ghaus-E-Azam Sheikh Muhiyuddin Abdul Qadir Jeelani (RA), a famous Sufi saint of Baghdad, He is the grandson of Shaikh Noorul Mashaikh Syed Ahmad Muhiyuddin Jeelani (RA) and the eldest son of Sheikh Quthubul Mashaikh Syed Arifuddin Jeelani (RA). Hazrat Shamsul Mashaikh Syed Ahmed Mohiuddin Jeelani Noori Shah Saani (db)(Janasheen Silsila E Nooria & Sajjada Nasheen Rouza e Nooria) is currently leading all the Urs programs of Sheikh NooriShah, Noorullah Shah and His Khulafas.

== Selected works ==
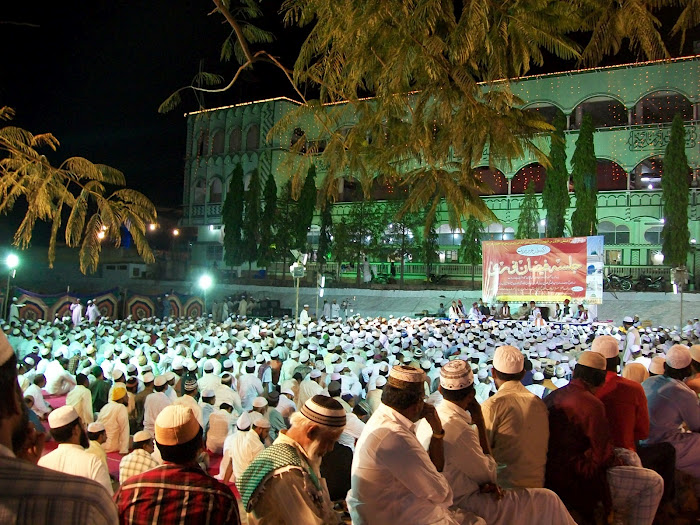
Annual gathering Urs Mubarak of Sheikh Noorul Mashaikh Syed Noori Shah Jeelani R (Faizan-e-Noori) at Bait-ul Arif, Noori Maskan, Hyderabad. Noori Maskan is now a vibrant centre which gives spiritual training to all seekers throughout the year

NooriShah Jeelani have authored multiple books of Islamic spirituality.

- Tafsīr-e-Noori
- Asrar-e-Lailahaillallah
- Ahmiyat-u-Tareeqat
- Taaruf-e-Muhammad
- Dada ki kahani pote ki zabani (Sharah or explanation of famous book on sufism Futuh-al-Ghaib)

== Spiritual chain ==
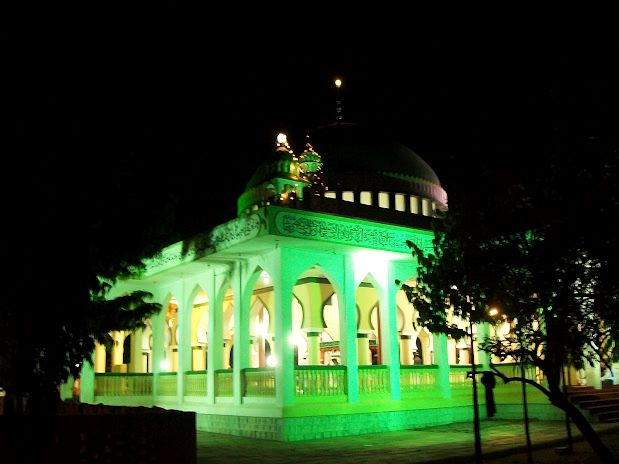
Rouza-e Nooria Dargah Sharif of Noorul Mashaikh Jeelani (R.A) in Noori Maskan, HYD, IND.

The chain of spiritual masters (silsila) of Nooriya reaches both Qadriya and Chistiya masters, hence it came to be known as Chisti-ul-Qadiri . Sheikh NooriShah Jeelani's spiritual preachings continued to influence millions of common people across more than 40 countries with the following major sub-branches:

- Silsila-e-Arifiya Nooriya was led by his own first son and Khalifa called Sheikh Qutb-ul-Mashaikh Noorullah Shah Noori Syed Arifudheen Jeelani. He was the Sajjada Janasheen of Silsila-e-Nooriya. He was thus 22'nd Grand Son of Sheikh Abdul Qadir Gilani. Sheikh Syed Muhammed Arifudheen Jeelani died on 13 March 2022 (10th Sha'aban 1443) in Al Arif Unani Medical College, Hyderabad which was built by himself. His Urs (anniversary of death) is celebrated on 10th day of month of Sha'ban (Islamic calendar). The Present Janasheen of Silsila-e-Arifiya Nooriya and Silsila-e-Nooriya is Sheikh Syed Arifudheen Jeelani's own eldest son Shams Ul Mashaikh Syed Ahmed Mohiuddin Jeelani NooriShah Saani (Damath Barakathuhum). He is the Present Janasheen of Silsila-e-Nooria and Sajjada Nasheen Rouza-e-Nooria. Sheikh Shams Ul Mashaikh NooriShah Saani currently leads all Urs celebrations of Sheikh NooriShah Jeelani at Noori Maskan in Hyderabad.
- Silsila-e-Kamaliya Nooriya led by his own son and Khalifa called Sheikh Syed Kamalullah Shah Noori (also known as Syed Mohammed Muneeruddin Jeelani) whose Mausoleum (or Tomb) is inside the same complex (Tomb) of Sheikh NooriShah Jeelani at Hyderabad, India
- Silsila-e-Asrariya Nooriya is led by his own son and Khalifa called Sheikh Mumtaz-ul-Mashaikh Rooh-ul-Irfan Kanz-ul-Asrar Syed Asrarullah Shah Noori (also known as Syed Mohammed Nasiruddin Jeelani) (Damath Barakathuhum). He has been contributing continuously to the academics of Islamic sciences being in teaching positions of Sufi philosophy, Hadees and Quran Tafseer in the famous Jamia Nizamia University of Hyderabad in India.
- Silsila-e-Zuhooriya Nooriya was led by his Khalifa called Sheikh Muballigh-ul-Ihsan wa Musahhihu Ta'aleemath Zuhoori Shah Noori Chisti-ul-Qadiri whose Mausoleum (or Tomb) is at Karuvarakundu area, Malappuram district in Kerala, India. His Urs (anniversary of death) is celebrated on 7th day of month of Ḏū al-Qaʿdah (Islamic calendar).
- Silsila-e-Faizeeya Nooriya was led by his Khalifa called Sheikh Shams-ul-Aarifeen Qutb-ul-Aqtab Khwaja Dil Nawaz Faizee Shah Noori Chisti-ul-Qadiri whose Mausoleum (or Tomb) is at Lalpet Dargah, Cuddalore District of Tamil Nadu, India. His Urs (anniversary of death) is celebrated on 20th day of month of Rajab (Islamic calendar).
- Silsila-e-Aamiria Nooriya was led by his Khalifa called Sheikh Shams-ul-Mufassireen Khwaja Faqeer Nawaz Syed Muhammad Umar Aamir Kaleemi Shah Noori Chisti-ul-Qadiri Al Hasani ul Hussaini Jafari ul Jeelani whose Mausoleum (or Tomb) is at GGA Pannur Dargah, Sunguvarchatram area, 60 km from Chennai District of Tamil Nadu, India. He was also known to be 30th grand son of Ghous-e-Azam Sheikh Abdul Qadir Jilani. His Urs (anniversary of death) is celebrated on 29th day of month of Muharram (Islamic calendar).
- Silsila-e-Khaleeliya Nooriya was led by his Khalifa called Sheikh Noorul Ulama Ibraheem Khaleelulla Shah Noori Chisti-ul-Qadiri whose Mausoleum (or Tomb) is at Parappuram area in Kerala, India
- Silsila-e-Ameeriya Nooriya was led by his Khalifa called Sheikh Ganj-ul-Marifat Shams-ul-Aarifeen Siraj-us-Saalikeen Khwaja Bekas Nawaz Ameerullah Shah Noori Chisti-ul-Qadiri whose Mausoleum (or Tomb) is at Sangareddy Dargah in Sangareddy District of Telangana, India. His Urs (anniversary of death) is celebrated on 28th day of month of Shawwal (Islamic calendar).
- Silsila-e-Jamaliya Nooriya was led by his Khalifa called Sheikh Jamal-ul-Aarifeen Hujjath-ul-Irfan Jamali Shah Noori Chisti-ul-Qadiri whose Mausoleum (or Tomb) is at Ayangudi Dargah in Kattumannarkoil of Cuddalore District of Tamil Nadu, India
- Silsila-e-Yaqoobia Nooriya is led by his Khalifa called Sheikh Nagam-ul-Aarifeen Mohammad Yaqoob Ali Shah Noori Chisti-ul-Qadiri (Damath barakatuhum) which is actively spreading knowledge of Sufism and spiritual training in Telangana, Andhra Pradesh and Kerala in India
- Silsila-e-Nizamiya Nooriya is led by his Khalifa called Sheikh Syed Nizami Shah Noori Chisti-ul-Qadiri (Damath barakatuhum) which is actively spreading knowledge of Sufism and spiritual training in Pondicherry and Tamil Nadu in India

== Related ==
- Mahmoodullah Shah
- Machiliwale Shah
- Kareemullah Shah
- Ghousi Shah
- Bande Nawaz
- Nasiruddin Chiragh Dehlavi
- Nizamuddin Auliya
- Moinuddin Chishti
- Abdul Qadir Gilani
- Ibn Arabi
- Maulana Rumi
