= Khalifeh Kandi =

Khalifeh Kandi (Persian: خليفه كندي) may refer to:

- Khalifeh Kandi, Hashtrud, East Azerbaijan Province
- Khalifeh Kandi, Maragheh, East Azerbaijan Province
- Khalifeh Kandi-ye Hatam, East Azerbaijan Province
- Khalifeh Kandi, Markazi
