= Khalife =

Khalife (sometimes spelled Khalifé) is a surname of Middle Eastern origin, and may refer to one of the following people:

- Daniel Khalife (born 2001), former British soldier and escaped prisoner
- Hilda Khalife (born 1973), Arabic TV presenter
- Ignace Abdo Khalifé, (1914–1998), Lebanese cleric, and the first Eparch of the Maronite Catholic Eparchy of Saint Maron of Sydney in Australia
- Marcel Khalife (born 1950), Lebanese musical composer, singer, and oud player
- Peter Khalife (born 1990), Lebanese-Cypriot football agent, manager, and former player
- Rami Khalifé (born 1981), French-Lebanese[2] composer and pianist
- Fady Khalife (born 1976), Registered Training Organisation Manager, Melbourne, Australia.

== See also ==
- Khalifa (disambiguation)
