= Ghousavi Shah =

Indian Sufi mystic and saint, scholar, writer and poet

Moulana Ghousavi Shah
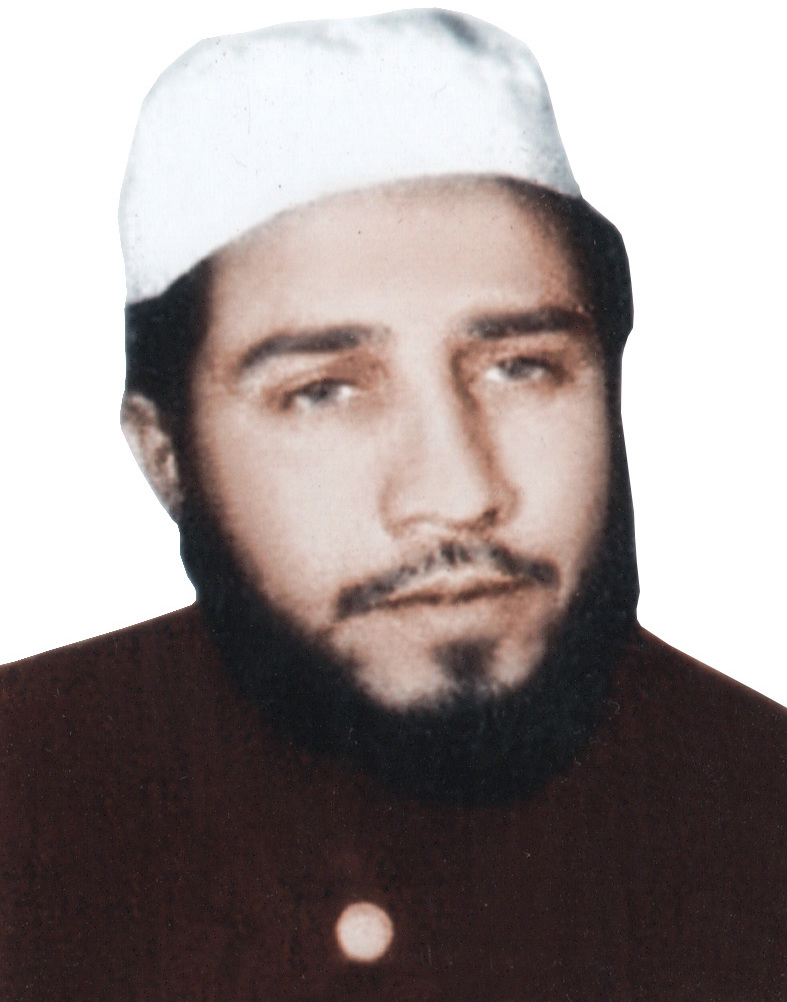
- Photo of Moulana Ghousavi Shah

Personal life
- Born: 4th November 1955 (age 70) Hyderabad, India
- Notable works: Author of Tajalliyat-E-Rabbani (The first book of its kind in the history of Islam).; Organised The Conference of World Religions.; Founder of Arabic Academy.; Author of more than 75 Books.
- Website: ghousavishah.com

Religious life
- Religion: Islam
- Sect: Sunni Hanafi
- Profession: Author

Muslim leader
- Based in: Hyderabad, India
- Predecessor: Moulana Sahvi Shah
- Successor: Kareemullah Shah Fateh

Moulana Ghousavi Shah (Persian/Urdu:الحاج حضرت مولانا غوثوی شاه) (4 November 1955) is a Muslim Mystic Teacher, Writer and Columnist who is famous as a great humanist in south India. He is from Jami-us-Salasil (Quadri, Chisti, Naqshbandi, Soharwardi Tabqati, Akbari, Owaisi).

== Titles ==
The successor of Moulana Sahvi Shah, Shah's titles include:

- Sharah Rumooze Quran-O-Hadith (Quranic Spiritual Analyst)
- Shaik-Ul-Islam Alambardare Sunniat
- Imam-Ut-Tareeqath
- Imam Ilmul Adad Wal Awfaq (Master of Numerology)
- Peshwae Ahle Sunnat (Chief of Ahle Sunnat)

== Biography ==
Moulana Ghousavi Shah belongs to spiritual lineage (Sufi Order) known as "Silsila-E-Sahvia Ghousia Kamalia". He is the grandson of Moulana Ghousi Shah, the successor khalifa of Syed Machliwale Shah a renowned Sufi saint. His father Moulana Sahvi Shah translated Quran and wrote many books on Tasawwuf and poetry. Ibne Arabi, who died in the year 1245 A.D. is the master of this order. Moulana Ghousavi Shah learnt Fussos-il-Hikam from his father and became an authority on wahdatul wujood. Moulana Ghousavi Shah imbibed the love of learning from his father and engrossed himself in Tasawwuf and writing books. His Khankhah "Baith-Un-Noor" is a spiritual center for people who want to explore their soul irrespective of caste and creed.

Shah studied the Quran, and the traditions and learnt Persian, Arabic, English and Urdu. His father taught him Sulook (mysticism), Sufi orders and virtues of tolerance.

Shah has written more than 50 books. His book "Tajalliyat-E-Rabbani"( The holy verses of Quran through images) is the first book of its kind in the history of Islam. He observes the annual anniversaries of the deaths of Imam-E-Azam Abu Hanifa and Shaik-E-Akbar Mohiuddin ibne Arabi. He has simplified the teachings of Shaik-E-Akbar Mohiuddin ibne Arabi, in consonance with the times.

Shah is the founder of Arabic Academy in Andhra Pradesh, which focuses on learning and understanding the Quran and Hadith. He also established the Conference of World Religions to bring all the religions to one platform, and he established "The World Peace Conference", held on 5 March 1989 at Hyderabad to propagate the Islamic teachings of brotherhood of mankind and to strengthen world peace. He has conducted many conferences to inculcate national integration and religious harmony.

=== Conference of World Religions ===
In 1987, Shah organized the first Conference of World Religions and brought all the religions on to one platform. This function attracted delegates from many parts of the world. He was the Secretary General of the Conference. The conference received encomiums from the scholars and public in large. The Second Conference of World Religions was held in Hyderabad in 1991. Again it promoted religious harmony and national integration among all religions. Attended by scholars and public from all corners of India. The Third Conference, in 1993, was held at Machilipatnam, a coastal city in South India. People are urged to understand that "Humanity is the primary objective of all religions".

=== Teachings ===
Shah's general teachings are:

1. God Almighty, is the creator of all things in the Universe.
2. God alone is the giver of profits and losses.
3. God the high above, fulfills the inherent needs and demands of whole of his creation to the highest pitch (directly as well as through some media or source).
4. God is neither a soul nor merely a power, but He is the creator of all such forces.
5. Nothing is self existing in reality but is subject to the act of creator i.e. God.
6. God is apparent by the shape of everything and is free from every shape. Everything is manifestation of God yet He is infinite and above His manifestations.
7. God is light and existence, whereas the creation without Him, in fact, is in the darkness of non-existence.
8. God is found of expression and man is in want of existence.
9. The human being is the everlasting bondman of the God high above (Man is the eternal and permanent slave of God).
10. Nothing has movement, except with the force of God.
11. Believe that God is with me and every act of me is in His sight.
12. We should worship God in a manner, as if we are seeing Him.
13. Man is bound to believe and accept all the previous prophets and messengers of God, with the due respect and without any prejudice. Man should also believe in the Holy Books and scriptures, revealed upon then by God. The vested interest of priest lords have, perhaps, corrupted some of the teachings. Now all human beings should follow the tenets of Islam, as enjoined in the Holy Quran and the traditions of Mohammad which cover and complete the mission of the all previous messengers of God.
14. The Prophet of Islam, Mohammad is the last of God's messengers. He is for the whole universe and for all time.
15. The Holy Principle of La-Ilaaha-illallahu Mohammadur-Rasoolullahi. (There is no God save Allah and Mohammad is his Prophet), is the guiding light from God and final and obligatory commandment.
16. In the light of Islam, all human beings are equal in the eyes of God irrespective of caste, creed class, colour. If there is any difference, it is on account of their good deeds.
17. Patriotism is part and parcel of belief (i.e., Iman).
18. As per one Hadees, The Islamic prophet Mohammad felt the smell of love from our motherland India. We are proud of being Indians. According to teaching of Islam one should give respect and be obedient to the ruler of his country and follow the constitution and rule of his motherland.

==== Zikr ====
Zikr (Dhikr) is a Sufi method in which God's name and virtues are repeated in a specific way. Moulana Ghousavi Shah says Noor (light) encompasses your mind, body and spirit when you practice zikr consistently with devotion. The heart-beats are transformed into spiritual beats, expelling all darkness lauding the virtues of zikr. Every Sunday many people of all ages attend zikr at his residence (Khankah).

==== Urs ====
The death anniversary is referred to as Urs in Sufism. On this occasion, teachings of the Sufi saint whose Urs is being performed are propagated. Every year, Shah conducts Urs for Shaik-E-Akbar Mohiuddin ibne Arabi, Syed Sultan Mahmoodullah Shah Hussaini, Syed Machiliwale Shah, Moulana Peer Ghousi Shah, and Moulana Peer Sahvi Shah to promote their teachings and also to solve pressing problems of the time.

== Notable published works ==
Shah's Tajalliyat-E-Rabbani was focused on an interpretation of the Quran. The book depicts the Quranic verses through images and explained them in Urdu and English for the younger generation.

== Notable family relations ==
- Hazrath Ghousi Shah
- Hazrath Kareemullah Shah
- Hazrath Machiliwale Shah
- Hazrath Mahmoodullah Shah
- Moulana Sahvi Shah

== Gallery ==
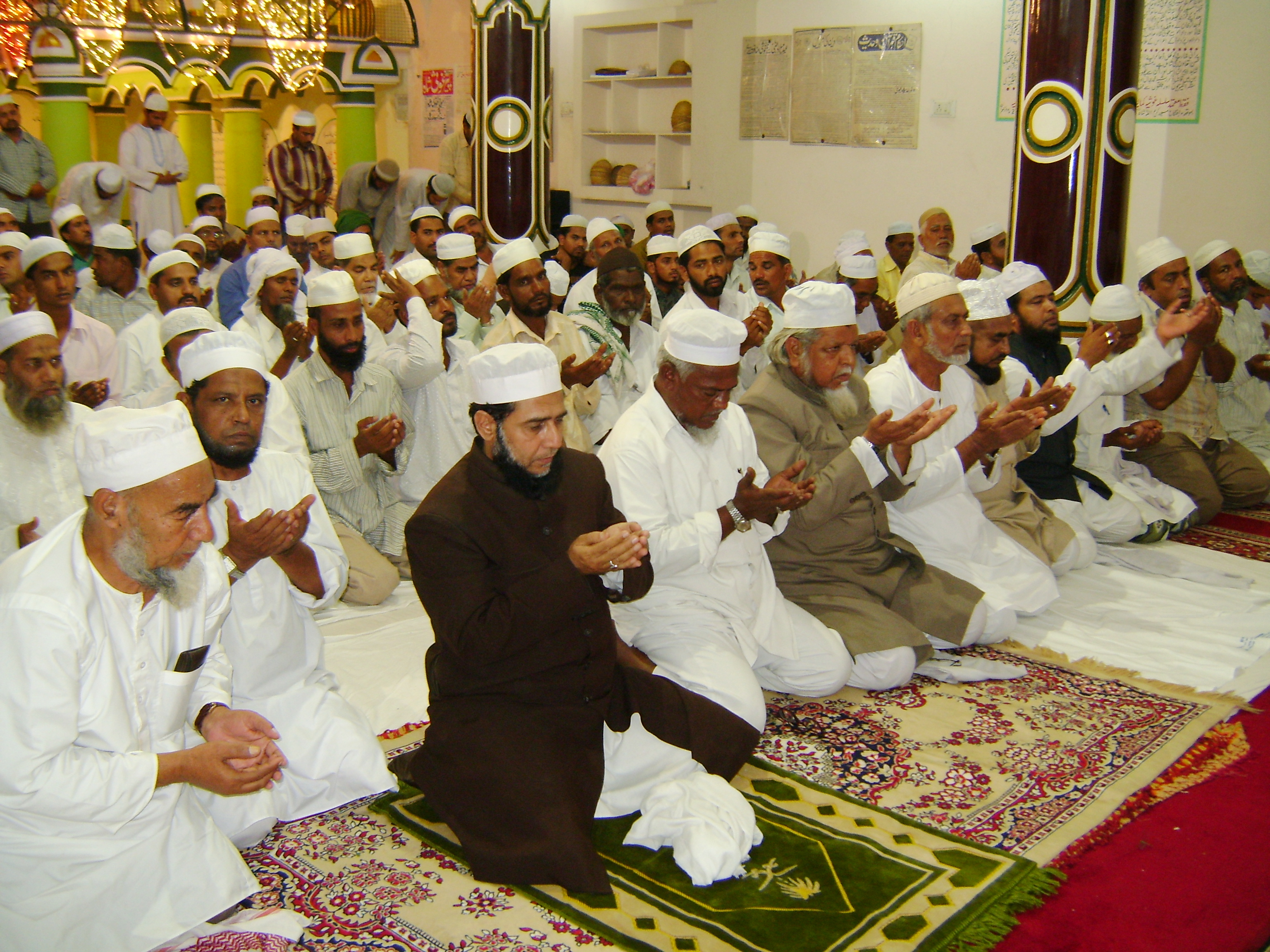
Moulana Ghousavi Shah praying dua at Masjid-E-Kareemullah Shah, Hyderabad

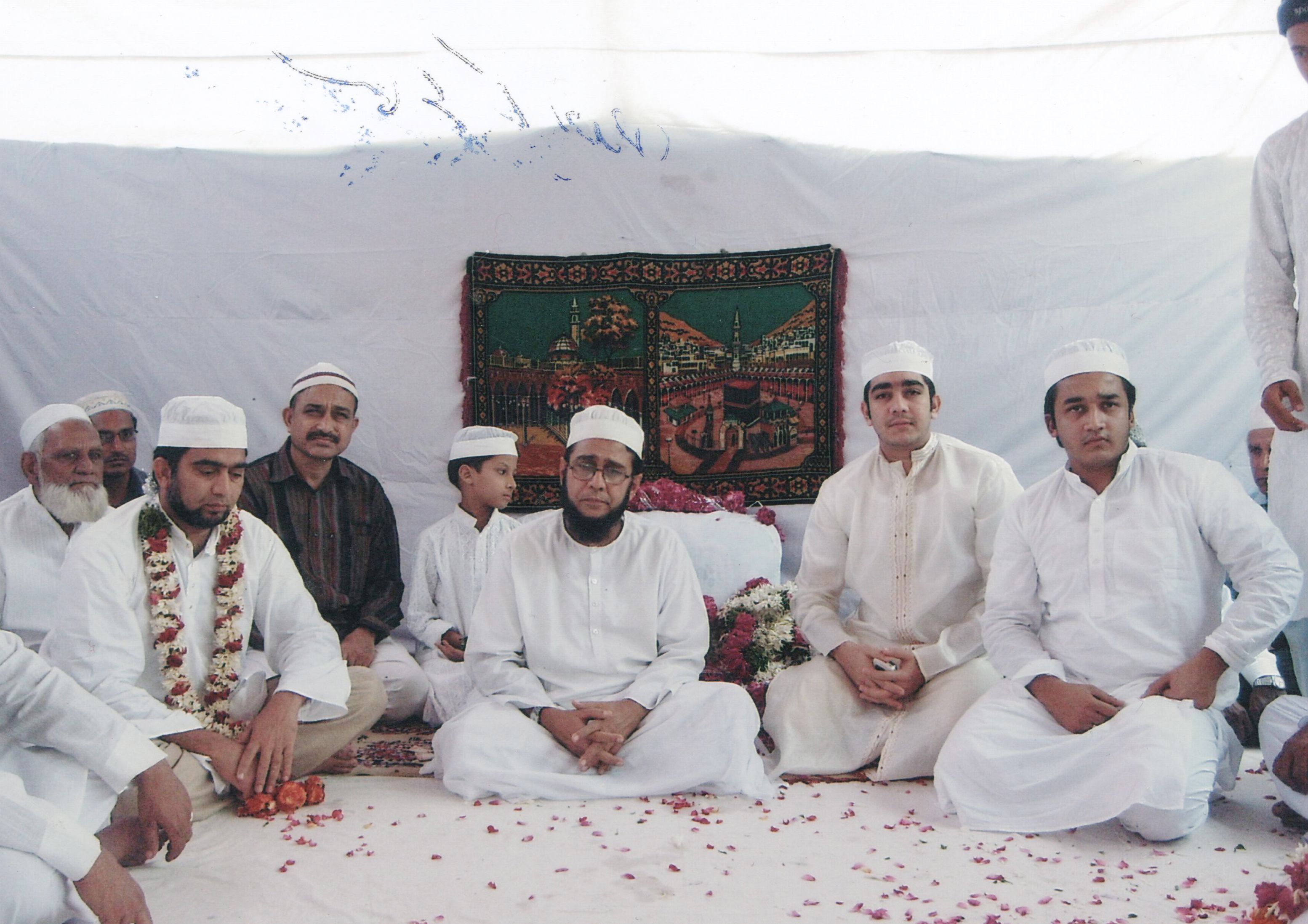
Moulana Ghousavi Shah in sama at Baith-Un-Noor, Upperpally, Hyderabad

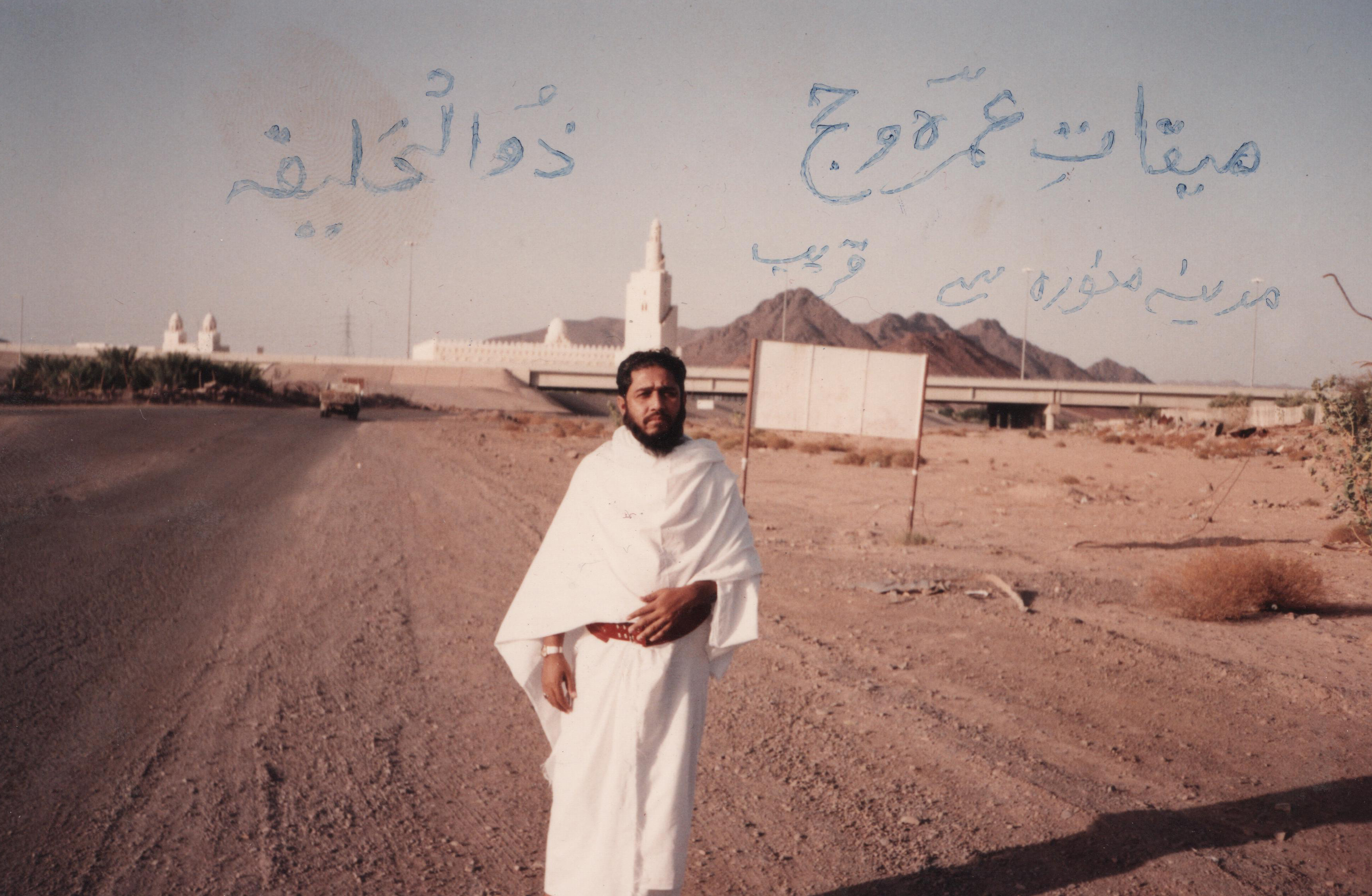
Moulana Ghousavi Shah near Madina Munawwara.

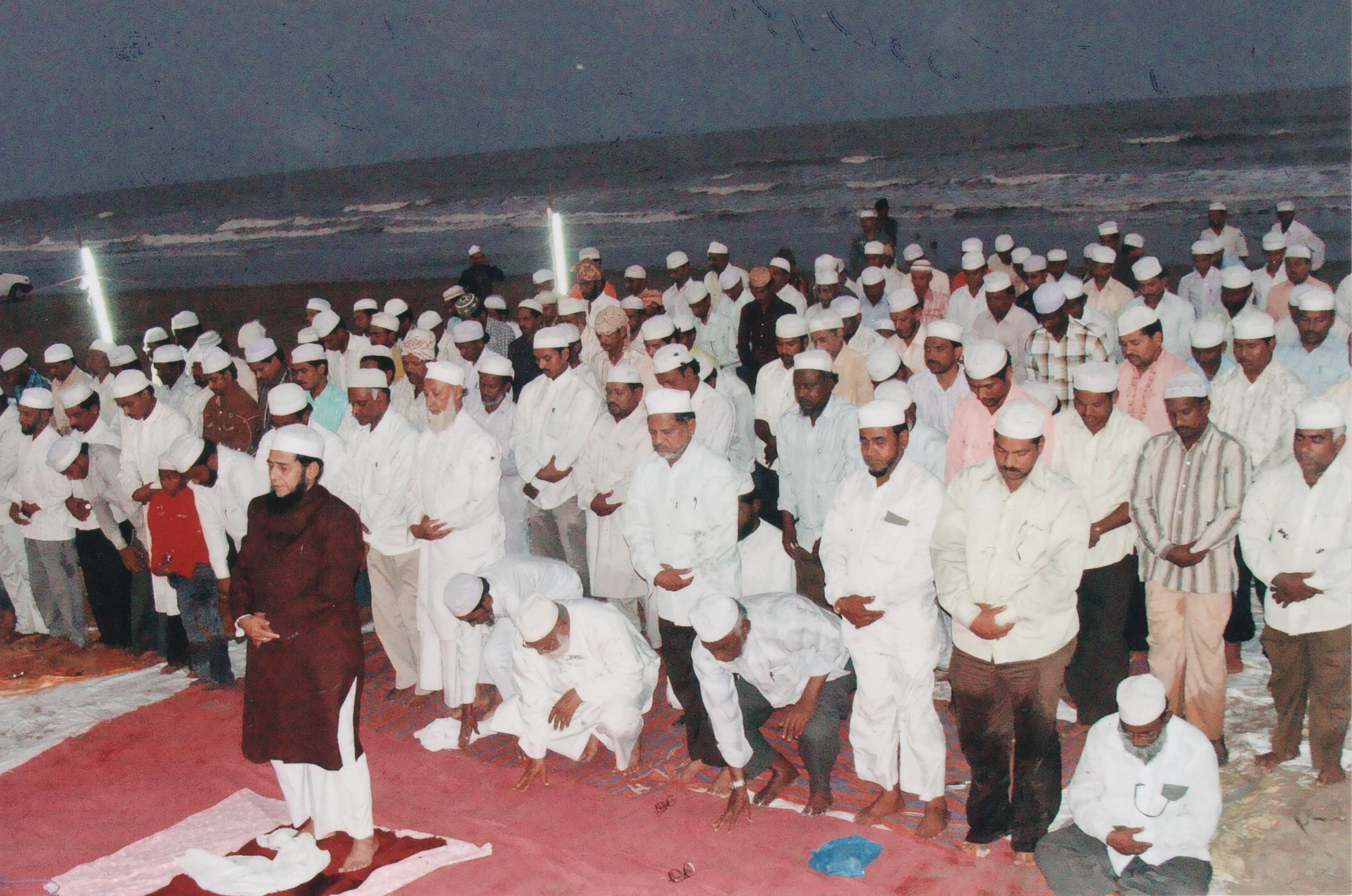
Moulana Ghousavi Shah praying Namaz with disciples at sea shore in Machilipatnam

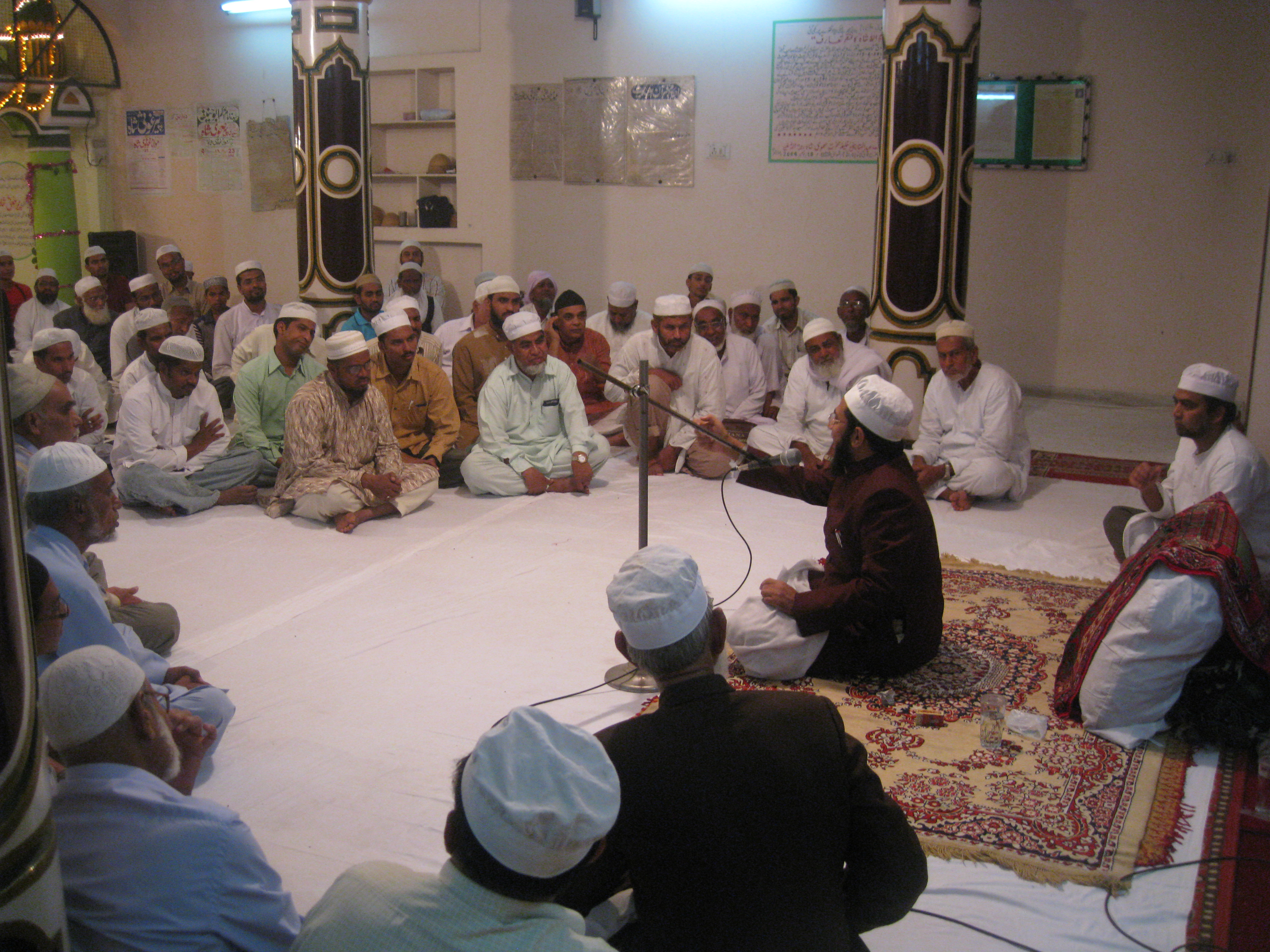
Moulana Ghousavi Shah delivering speech at Masjid-E-Kareemullah Shah

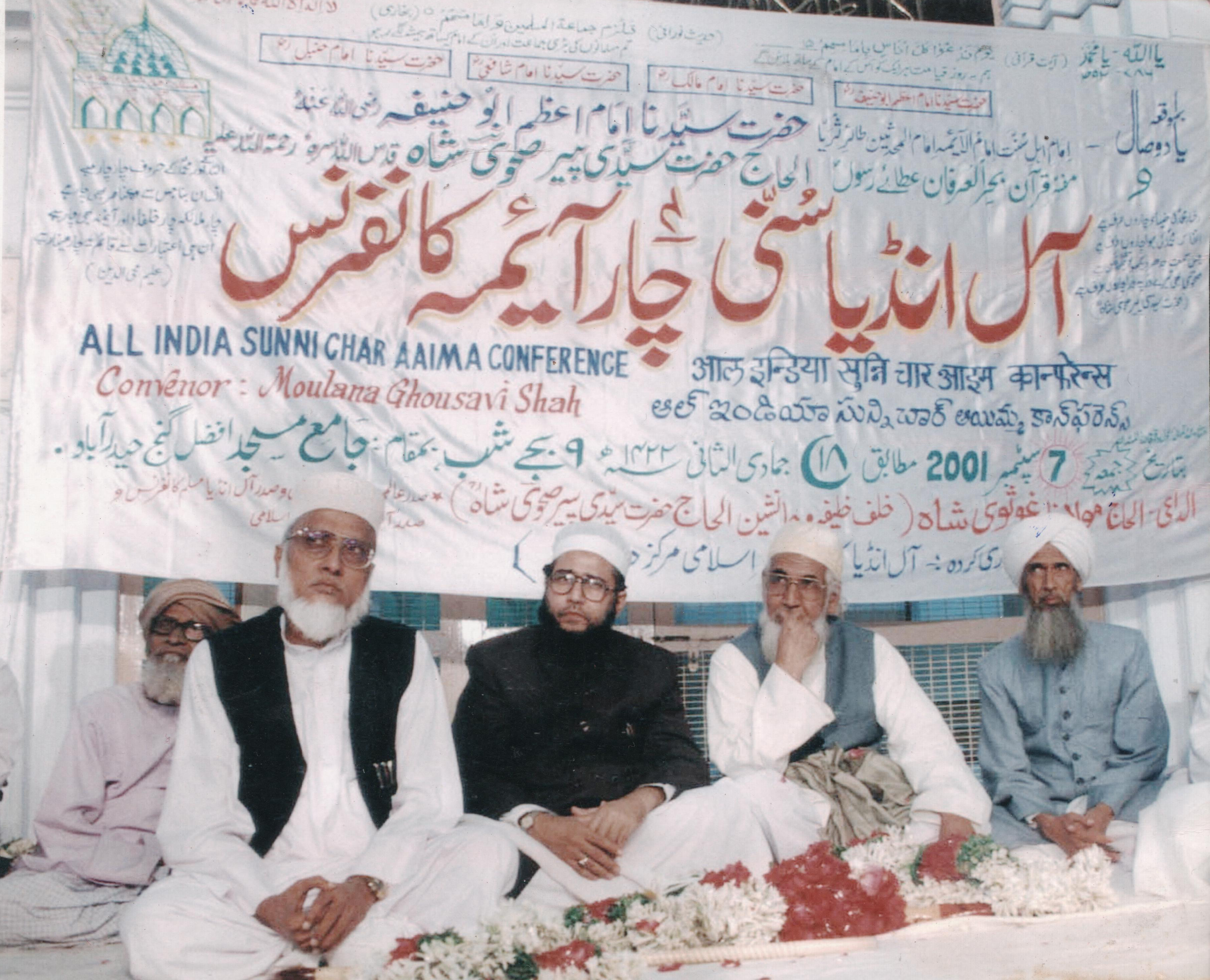
All India Sunni Char Aimma Conference, Hyderabad

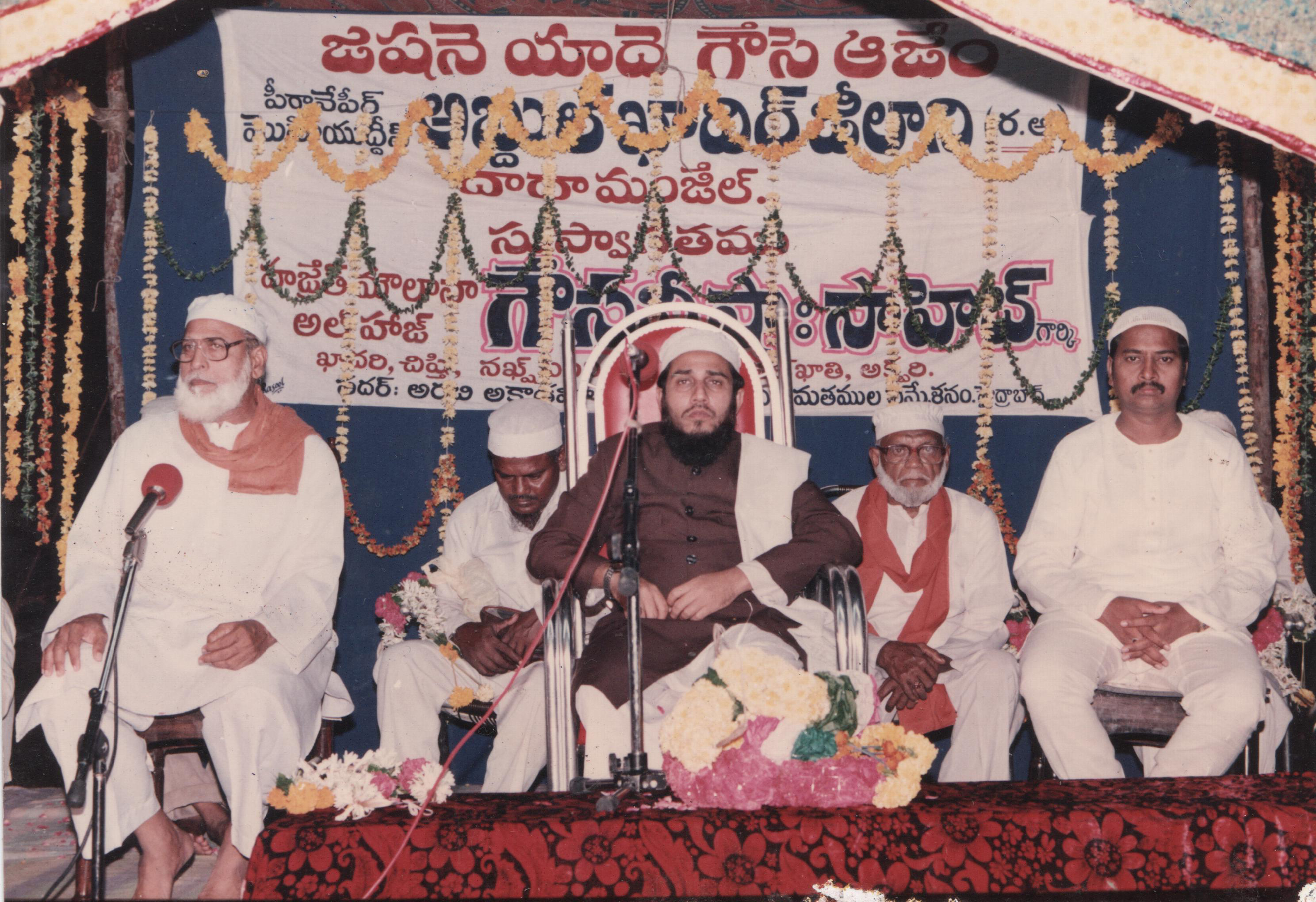
Jashn-E-Ghouse-E-Azam

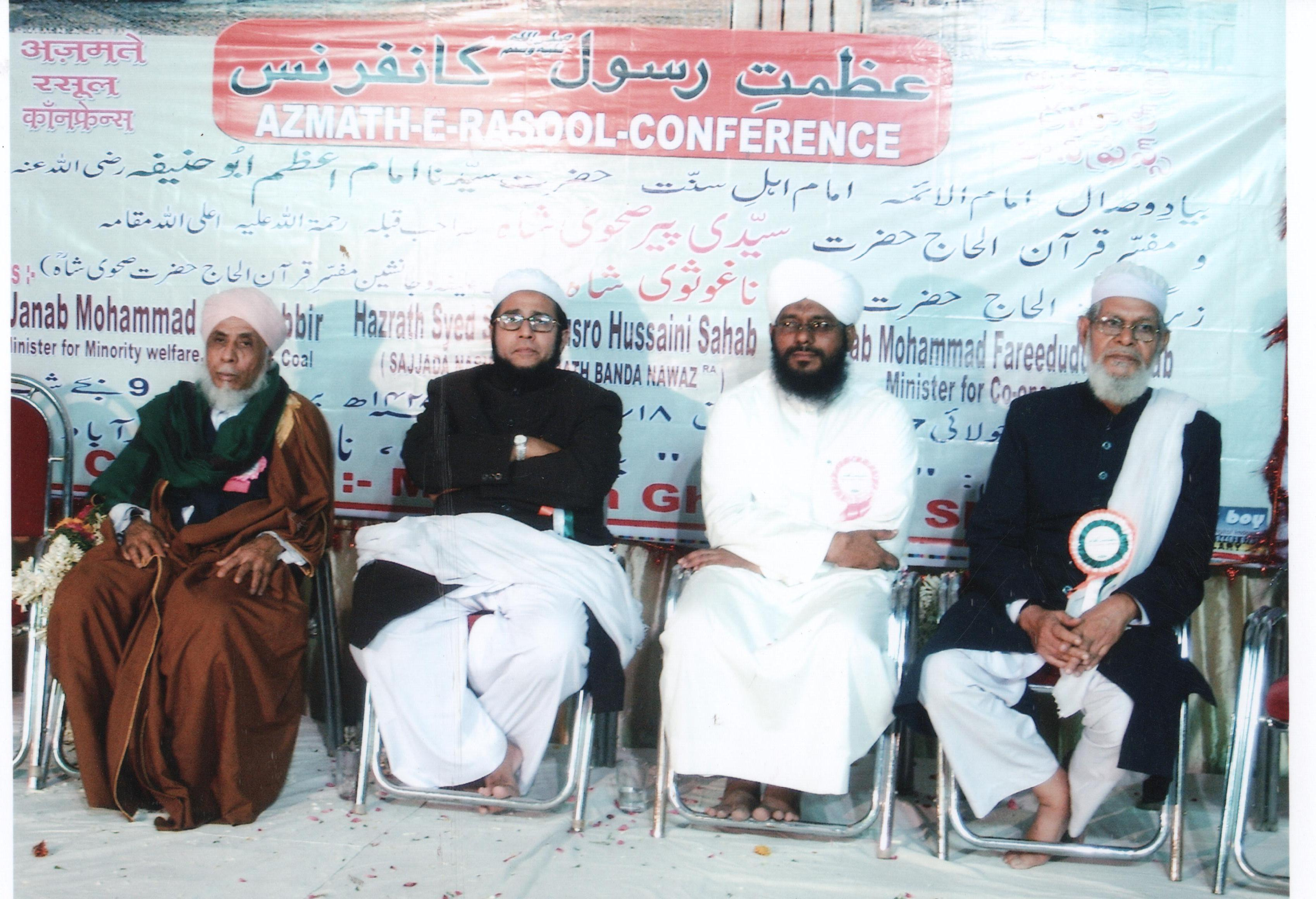
First Azmath-E-Rasool Conference, Hyderabad

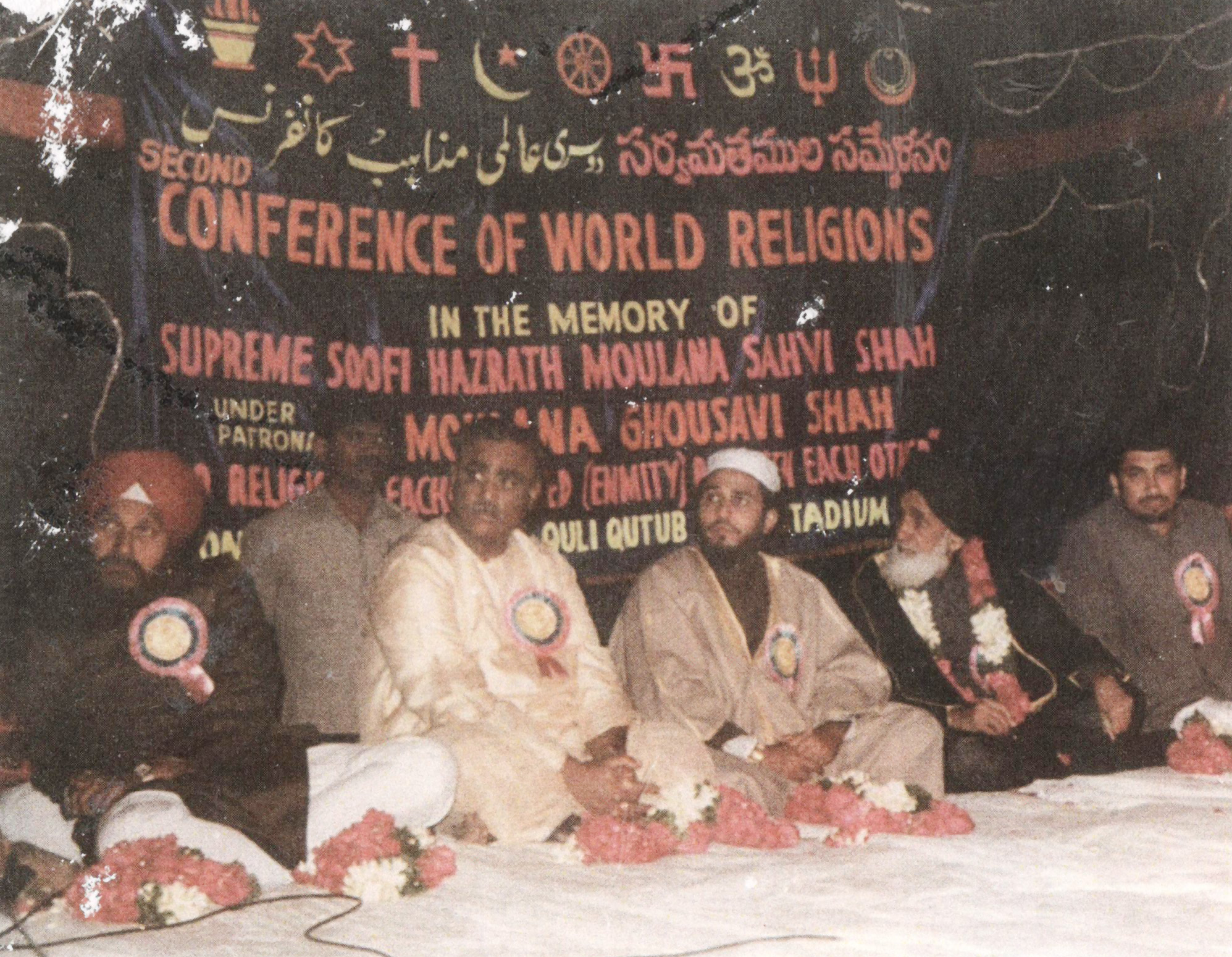
Second Conference of World Religions

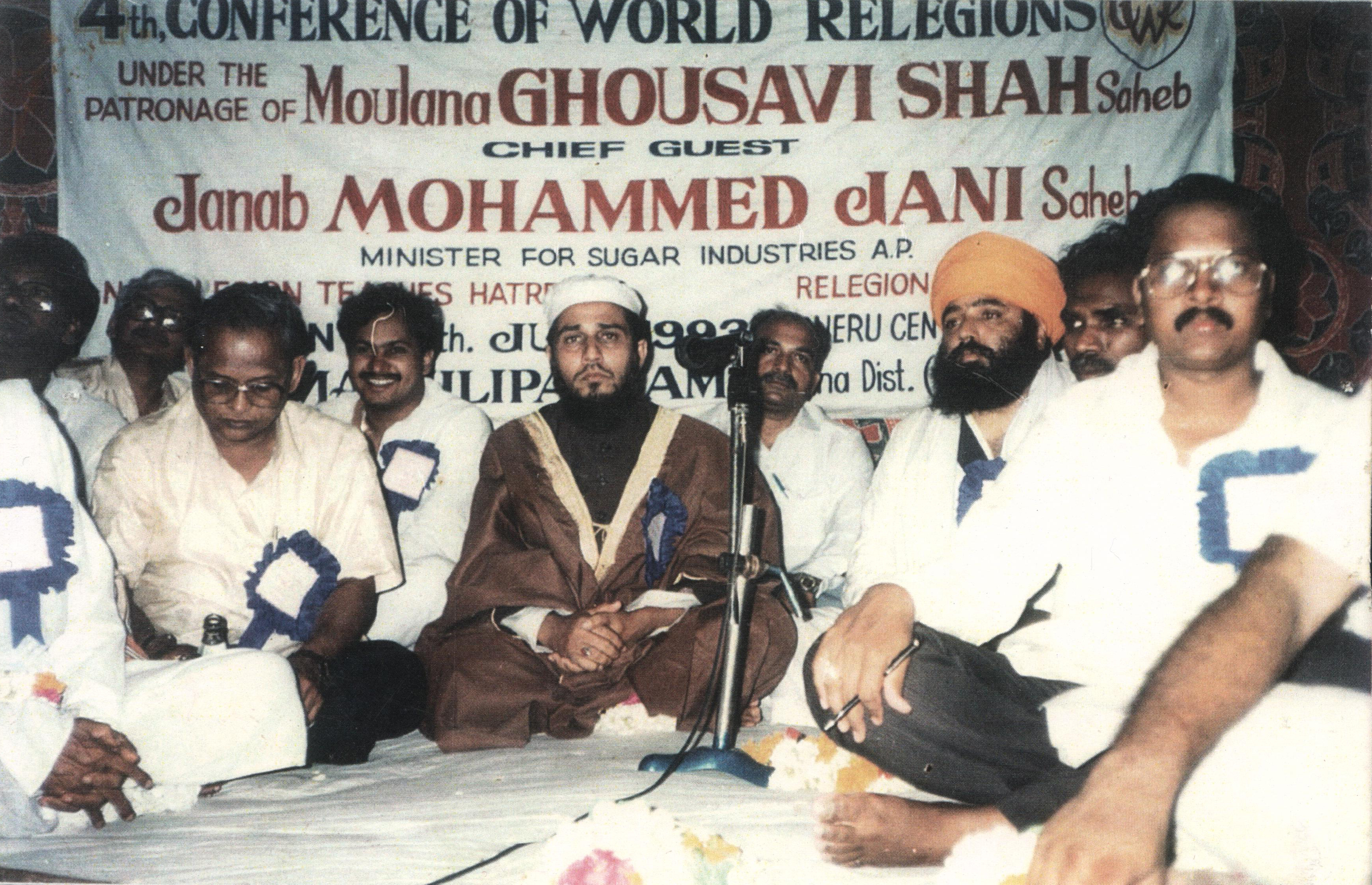
Fourth Conference of World Religions
