= Caliph (disambiguation) =

A caliph is the head of state in a caliphate, and the title for the leader of the Islamic Ummah, an Islamic community ruled by the Shari'ah

- Khalifa is the Arabic word for caliph.

Caliph may also refer to:

- USS Caliph (SP-272), a United States Navy patrol vessel
- Enispe (butterfly), a genus of butterflies also known as caliphs
- Caliph, South Australia, a locality in the Murray Mallee region of South Australia, Australia

== See also ==
- List of caliphs
- Caliphate (disambiguation)
- Khalifa (disambiguation)
