= Khalifehi =

Khalifehi (Persian: خليفه اي) may refer to:

- Khalifehi, Bushehr
- Khalifehi, Kohgiluyeh and Boyer-Ahmad

== See also ==
- Khalifeh (disambiguation)
