= Pirəsora, Mistan =

Village in Lerik District, Azerbaijan

Coordinates: 38.64217°N 48.41348°E

Pirəsora is a village in the municipality of Mistan in the Lerik Rayon of Azerbaijan.
