= Mahmoodullah Shah =

Sufi saint and scholar

Syed Sultan Mahmoodullah Shah Hussaini
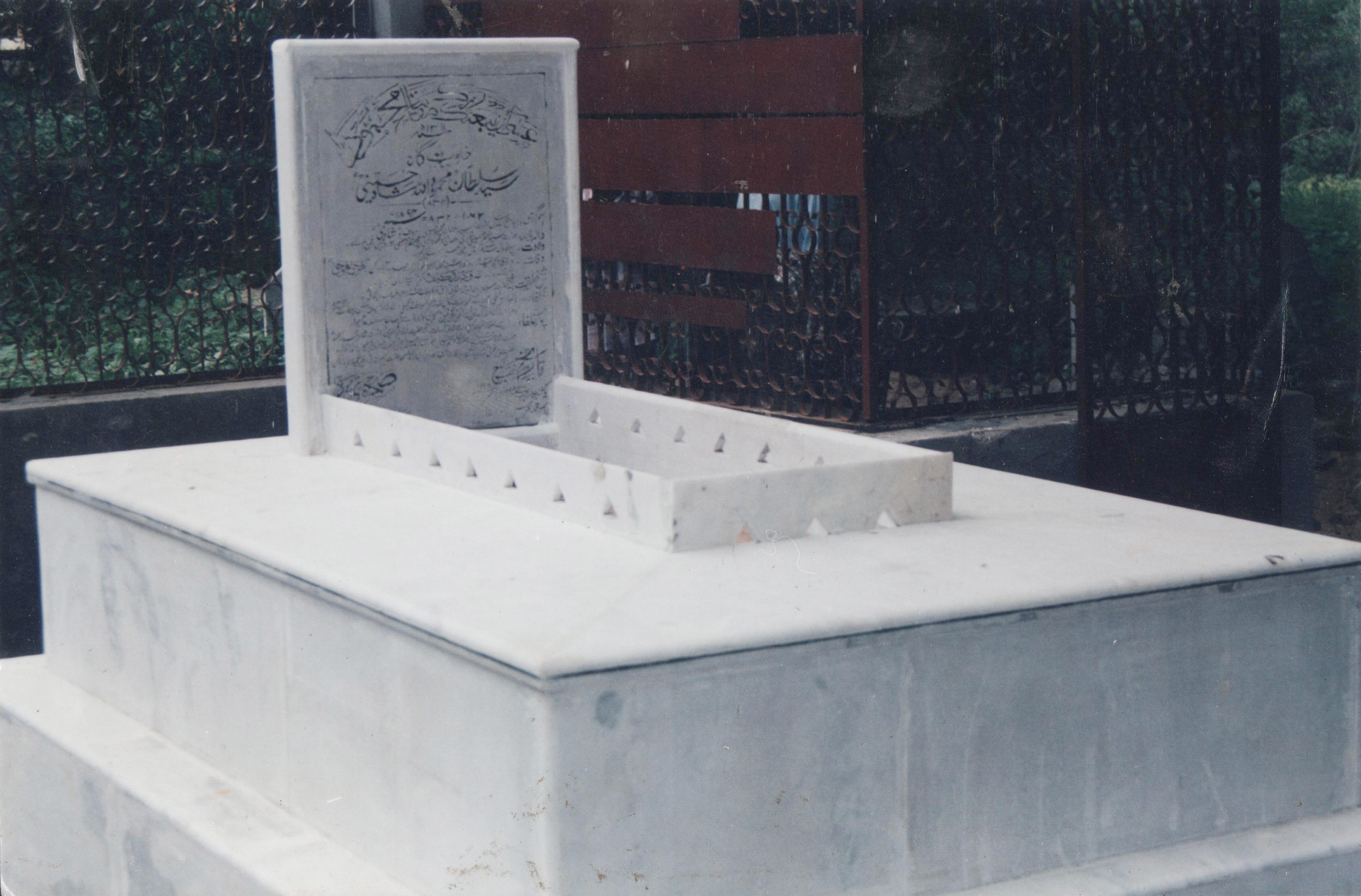
- Grave (Mazaar) photo

Personal life
- Died: 6th Zilhajja, 1311 AH, 1894 CE
- Website: http://www.mgshah.com

Religious life
- Religion: Islam
- Sect: Sunni Hanafi
- Profession: Author

Muslim leader
- Based in: Hyderabad, India
- Predecessor: Shaikh Syed Burhanuddin Haqqani Haqnuma
- Successor: Syed Machiliwale Shah

Syed Sultan Mahmoodullah Shah Hussaini (died 1894 CE), also known as "Shah ji", was a renowned Muslim Sufi, saint and scholar of the Quadri, Chisti order from the Indian subcontinent. He was the native of Kurnool . His most famous disciple and spiritual successor was Machiliwale Shah, who in turn became the spiritual master of India's noted Sufi saint.

== Biography ==
Syed Sultan Mahmoodullah Shah Hussaini was a spiritual student (murid or disciple) of the famous Sufi Shaikh Syed Burhanuddin Haqqani Haqnuma (whose tomb is situated in Trunk Road, Rayachoti, Kadapa district of Andhra Pradesh). He stayed in Secunderabad and Hyderabad for many years. Many scholars of twin cities learned the intricacies of Tauheed and Tasawwuf from him. He initiated Shah Kamalullah popularly known as Machiliwale Shah in tasawwuf and made him his spiritual successor (Janasheen-e-Silisa).

== Death ==
He died on 6th Zilhajja, 1311 AH corresponding to 1894 CE. His mazar (grave) is situated in Takia Munnamiya, beside Osmania general Hospital, Afzalgunj, Hyderabad.

== Urs ==
His annual Urs is organized by his present successor Moulana Ghousavi Shah (Secretary General:The Conference of World Religions & President: All India Muslim Conference) on 29th Rabi-us-sani every year.

== Related ==
- Machiliwale Shah
- Kareemullah Shah
- Ghousi Shah
- Moulana Sahvi Shah
- Alhaj Moulana Ghousavi Shah
- Syed Ahmed Muhayuddin Noori Shah
