= Qələbın, Mistan =

Village in Lerik District, Azerbaijan

Coordinates: 38.6681°N 48.4228°E

Qələbın is a village in the municipality of Mistan in the Lerik Rayon of Azerbaijan.
