= Caliphate (disambiguation) =

A caliphate is an Islamic state ruled by a caliph.

Caliphate may also refer to:

- Caliphate (TV series), a Swedish drama television series
- Caliphate (podcast), a podcast produced by The New York Times
- The Caliphate (book), by William Muir
- Caliphate State, a Turkish Islamist group based in Cologne, Germany

== See also ==
- Caliph (disambiguation)
