= Mistan =

- Municipality
- Location within Azerbaijan
- Coordinates: 38°38′46″N 48°25′55″E
- Country: Azerbaijan
- Rayon: Lerik

Population
  - Total: 430
- Time zone: UTC+4 (AZT)
  - Summer (DST): UTC+5 (AZT)

Mistan is a village and municipality in the Lerik Rayon of Azerbaijan. It has a population of 430. The municipality consists of the villages of Mistan, Digov, Digovdərə, Qələbın, Pirəsora, and Xəlfəlikənd.
