= Moulana Sahvi Shah =

Muslim mystic and author

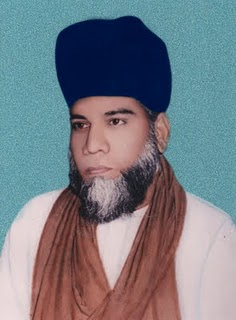
- Photo of Moulana Sahvi Shah

Personal life
- Born: Friday, 23 February 1923, 6th Rajjab 1345H. Hyderabad, India
- Died: Tuesday 15 May 1979, 18th Jamadi-Us-Sani 1399 Hijri
- Notable work(s): Founder of Conference of World Religions, Editor for Urdu Weeklies "Jhalkian", "Inquilab" and "Al-Noor" Newspaper
- Website: ghousavishah.com

Religious life
- Religion: Islam
- Sect: Sunni Hanafi
- Profession: Author

Muslim leader
- Based in: Hyderabad, India
- Predecessor: Hazrath Peer Ghousi Shah
- Successor: Moulana Ghousavi Shah

Moulana Sahvi Shah (Persian/Urdu:مولانا صحوى شاه; 1923–1979) was a Muslim Sufi mystic, saint, scholar, writer and poet from the Indian subcontinent. Moulana Sahvi Shah was born in 1923 in the city of Hyderabad. His father, Ghousi Shah named him after Shaikh-E-Akbar Ibn-E-Arabi as he saw the great saint in a vision before the birth of his son.

== Biography ==
Moulana Sahvi Shah was born in 1923 in the city of Hyderabad on the day of Urs of Gharib Nawaz which is celebrated by Muslims of India on the 6th of Rajjab every year. When Moulana Sahvi Shah was 4 years 4 months his Bismillah Ceremony was performed. The proceedings took place under the patronage of Machliwale Shah. Alhaj Kareemullah Shah Saheb, his grand father was a noted saint of Hyderabad and was a great interpreter of Moulana Rum. Ghousi Shah Sahab was his mureed, Khalifa and successor. He died in 1913. Moulana Sahvi Shah was nine years old, when the Ilahi chaman saint died. He had the privilege to serve him, even as a child. By that time, he could learn Arabic, Persian and Urdu and Hadith, Fiqh, Tafseer. His father Ghousi Shah played a great role in moulding his child's intellectual purity and instigated in love for Tasawwuf. He was Aashiqe Rasool – a great lover of Islamic prophet Mohammed. Besides, he was a great lover of God too. Much of his life was spent in reciting His name and obeying his commands.

== Spiritual history ==
Moulana Sahvi Shah Saheb was 27 when Caliphate was conferred upon him. The conferment of Caliphate was hailed by other members of futernity. It was in 1954 a few months before Ghousi Shah died. Right from 1954 till 1979 Sahvi Shah Saheb, lectured, and wrote ceaselessly and toured all parts of India, spreading the tenets of tawhid. He was a saint of Quadri, Chisti, Naqshbandi, Soharwardi, Tabqati, Owaisi, Akbari order. He conferred the Khilafat upon his eldest son, Ghousavi Shah, before his death and he was made successor.

== Titles ==
- Founder of Conference of World Religions
- Ata-E-Rasool
- Mufassir-E-Quran
- Behrul Irfan
- Shaikh-Ul-Islam

== Life ==
Sahvi Shah Saheb is preoccupied totally in spreading the message of his father and grandfather, through writings and lectures. He conducts zikr every week in his Khanakha (Baith-Un-Noor) and the Urs celebrations of the four saints of the Silsila are observed regularly. Besides lecturers are also conducted on Imam Abu Hanifa and Ibne Arabi.

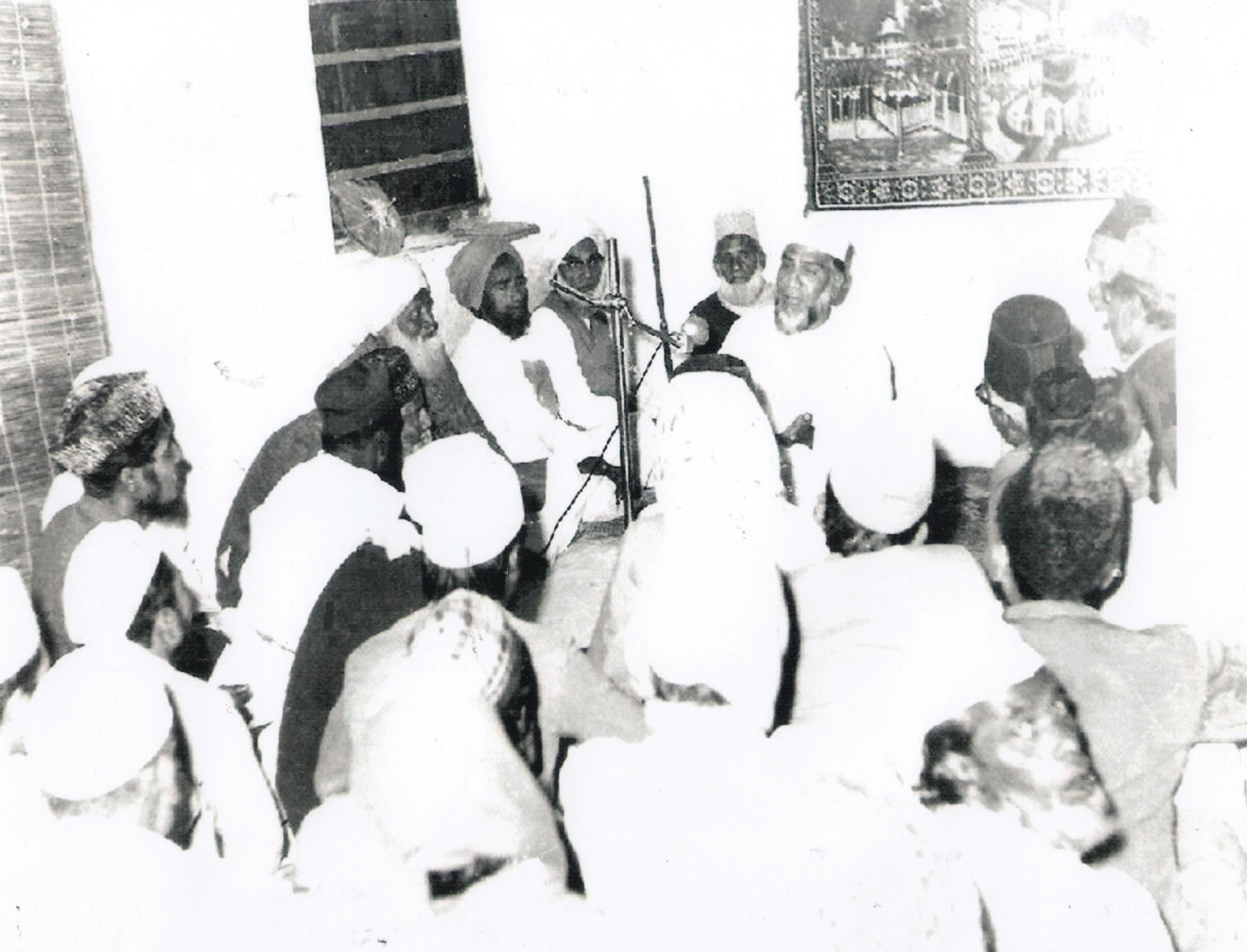
Moulana Peer Sahvi Shah delivering speech

== Works ==
Sahvi Shah published his first book of verse "Akse Lateef" when he was just 18. The critic Naiz Fatehapuri, hailed it as a commendable output from one who was young and intelligent. He said the young poet had all the characteristics of a good poet. Sahvi Shah Sahab continued to publish further collections namely "Takdeese Sher","Nazre Madina", Tathir-E-Ghazal – all well received. He dubbed in the new form of poetry Sulasi and wrote it with great feeling. He translated passages from Quran (Alam Tara; Surah Baqarah) and wrote on Tasawuf (Irshadat-e-Sulook) explaining the significance of Sufi tenets. In Bidat-E-Hasna, he defended the practices of Sunnis. His talk Tazkia Nafs – Purification of the self, broadcast from All India Radio, Hyderabad was highly hailed in spiritual circles.

Sahvi Shah was also a journalist. He edited Urdu Weeklies / Fort-Nightlies and "Jhalkian & Inquilab" when his father was alive edited Al-Noor, after his death in memory of his father. The magazines became popular in spiritual circles. As the core message was the spread of Tawheed.

== Books ==
- Kitab-Um-Mubeen(Tafseer-E-Quran)
- Tashri Tarjuma Quran
- Usool-E-Deen
- Irshadat-E-Sulook
- Radd-E-Munafaqat
- Bidat-E-Hasana
- Saere-Abdeath
- Alamtara Ta-wannas(Translation in Poems)
- Nazre Madina
- Tathir-E-Ghazal
- Takdees-E-Sher
- Isharate Sulook
- Mauje Hawa
- Giyara Majalis
- Khoon-Pare

== Related ==
- Mahmoodullah Shah
- Machiliwale Shah
- Kareemullah Shah
- Ghousi Shah
- Alhaj Moulana Ghousavi Shah
