= Kareemullah Shah =

Indian Islamic scholar and Sufi

Personal life
- Born: 1838 Begum Bazar, Hyderabad, India.
- Died: 15 April 1913 (aged 74–75)

Religious life
- Religion: Islam
- Sect: Sunni Hanafi

Muslim leader
- Based in: Hyderabad, India
- Predecessor: Shah Ashraf Ali Naqshbandi Hyderabadi
- Successor: Ghousi Shah

Kareemullah Shah (died 15 April 1913) was a Muslim Sufi, saint and scholar of the Naqshbandi order from Indian sub continent. He was born in 1838 in the city of Hyderabad. His spiritual successor was Ghousi Shah.

== Death ==
He died on 15 April 1913. His grave is situated in his mosque "Masjid-E-Kareemullah Shah", Begum Bazar, behind Osmania general Hospital, Afzalgunj, Hyderabad.

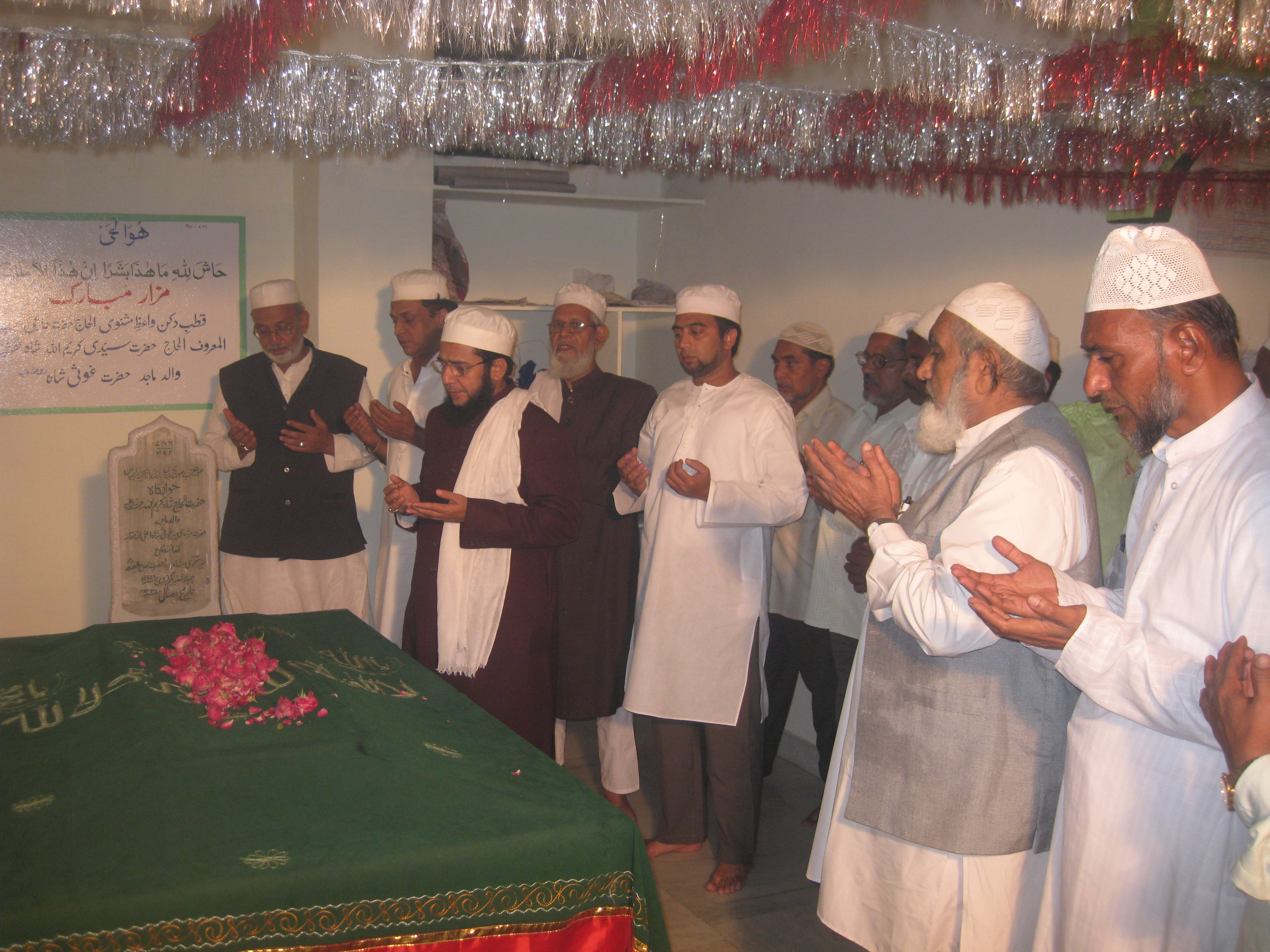
Mazaar Shareef(Grave) of Peer Kareemullah Shah

== Urs ==
His annual Urs is organized by his present successor Moulana Ghousavi Shah (Secretary General: The Conference of World Religions & President: All India Muslim Conference) every year.

== See also ==
- Alhaj Moulana Ghousavi Shah
- Ghousi Shah
- Machiliwale Shah
- Mahmoodullah Shah
- Moulana Sahvi Shah
