= Digov =

- Location within Azerbaijan
- Coordinates: 38°38′15″N 48°25′25″E
- Country: Azerbaijan
- Rayon: Lerik
- Municipality: Mistan
- Time zone: UTC+4 (AZT)
  - Summer (DST): UTC+5 (AZT)

Digov (also, Digov-Dara, Digovdere, and Dygov-Dara) is a village in the Lerik Rayon of Azerbaijan. The village forms part of the municipality of Mistan.
