= Digovdərə =

Village in Lerik District, Azerbaijan

Digovdərə is a village in the municipality of Mistan in the Lerik Rayon of Azerbaijan.
