= Qaleh Khalifeh =

Qaleh Khalifeh or Qaleh-ye Khalifeh (Persian: قلعه خليفه) may refer to:

- Qaleh Khalifeh, Hamadan

== See also ==
- Khalifeh (disambiguation)
