= Khalifa (caste) =

Muslim caste in Gujarat, India and parts of Pakistan

The Khalifa are a predominantly Muslim caste based in Valsad district, Gujarat, India; in Pakistan, they also reside in Islamabad, the national capital, as well as in Lyari, Karachi. The Khalifa caste is classed as Indo-Arabs as they are Muslim although some claim to have African heritage. Traditionally barbers and musicians, many immigrated to the United Kingdom in the 1960s, and are today active in their traditional roles in their adopted country.
