= Khalifa Point =

Town in Balochistan, Pakistan

Khalifa Point is a coastal cape west of Isa, a small town located in Lasbela District, Balochistan, Pakistan.

== See also ==
- Lasbela District
