= Khalifeh Bapir =

Khalifeh Bapir خليفه باپير
- Village
- Location within Iran
- Coordinates: 34°56′15″N 47°14′14″E
- Country: Iran
- Province: Kermanshah
- County: Sonqor
- Bakhsh: Kolyai
- Rural District: Agahan

Population (2006)
  - Total: 110
- Time zone: UTC+3:30 (IRST)
  - Summer (DST): UTC+4:30 (IRDT)

Khalifeh Bapir (Persian: خليفه باپير, also Romanized as Khalīfeh Bāpīr) is a village in Agahan Rural District, Kolyai District, Sonqor County, Kermanshah Province, Iran. At the 2006 census, its population was 110, in 25 families.
