= Khalifeh Torkhan =

Khalifeh Torkhan خليفه ترخان
- Village
- Location within Iran
- Coordinates: 35°29′02″N 47°04′10″E
- Country: Iran
- Province: Kurdistan
- County: Sanandaj
- Bakhsh: Central
- Rural District: Hoseynabad-e Jonubi

Population (2006)
  - Total: 230
- Time zone: UTC+3:30 (IRST)
  - Summer (DST): UTC+4:30 (IRDT)

Khalifeh Torkhan (Persian: خليفه ترخان, also Romanized as Khalīfeh Torkhān) is a village in Hoseynabad-e Jonubi Rural District, in the Central District of Sanandaj County, Kurdistan Province, Iran. At the 2006 census, its population was 230, in 55 families. The village is populated by Kurds.
