= Khalifeh-ye Heydar =

Khalifeh-ye Heydar خليفه حيدر
- Village
- Location within Iran
- Coordinates: 31°53′14″N 48°36′15″E
- Country: Iran
- Province: Khuzestan
- County: Shush
- Bakhsh: Shavur
- Rural District: Ahudasht

Population (2006)
  - Total: 537
- Time zone: UTC+3:30 (IRST)
  - Summer (DST): UTC+4:30 (IRDT)

Khalifeh-ye Heydar (Persian: خليفه حيدر, also Romanized as Khalīfeh-ye Ḩeydar; also known as Shahīd Sobḩānī, and Ţalaylī) is a village in Ahudasht Rural District, Shavur District, Shush County, Khuzestan Province, Iran. At the 2006 census, its population was 537 across 69 families.
