= Khalifa Cohen =

Tunisian rabbi (died 1932)

Khalifa Cohen (Hebrew: כליפה הכהן, romanized: Khalifa ha-Kohen; died 9 July 1932) was a rabbi of Djerba, Tunisia. He was the author of Sifte renanot, a commentary on the Psalms, and Ḳunteris ha-semikhut, notes on diverse subjects.

== Publications ==
- Sifte renanot [Joyful Lips]. Jerusalem: Israel Frumkin. 1890.
