= Khalifeh Kandi, Maragheh =

Khalifeh Kandi خليفه كندي
- Village
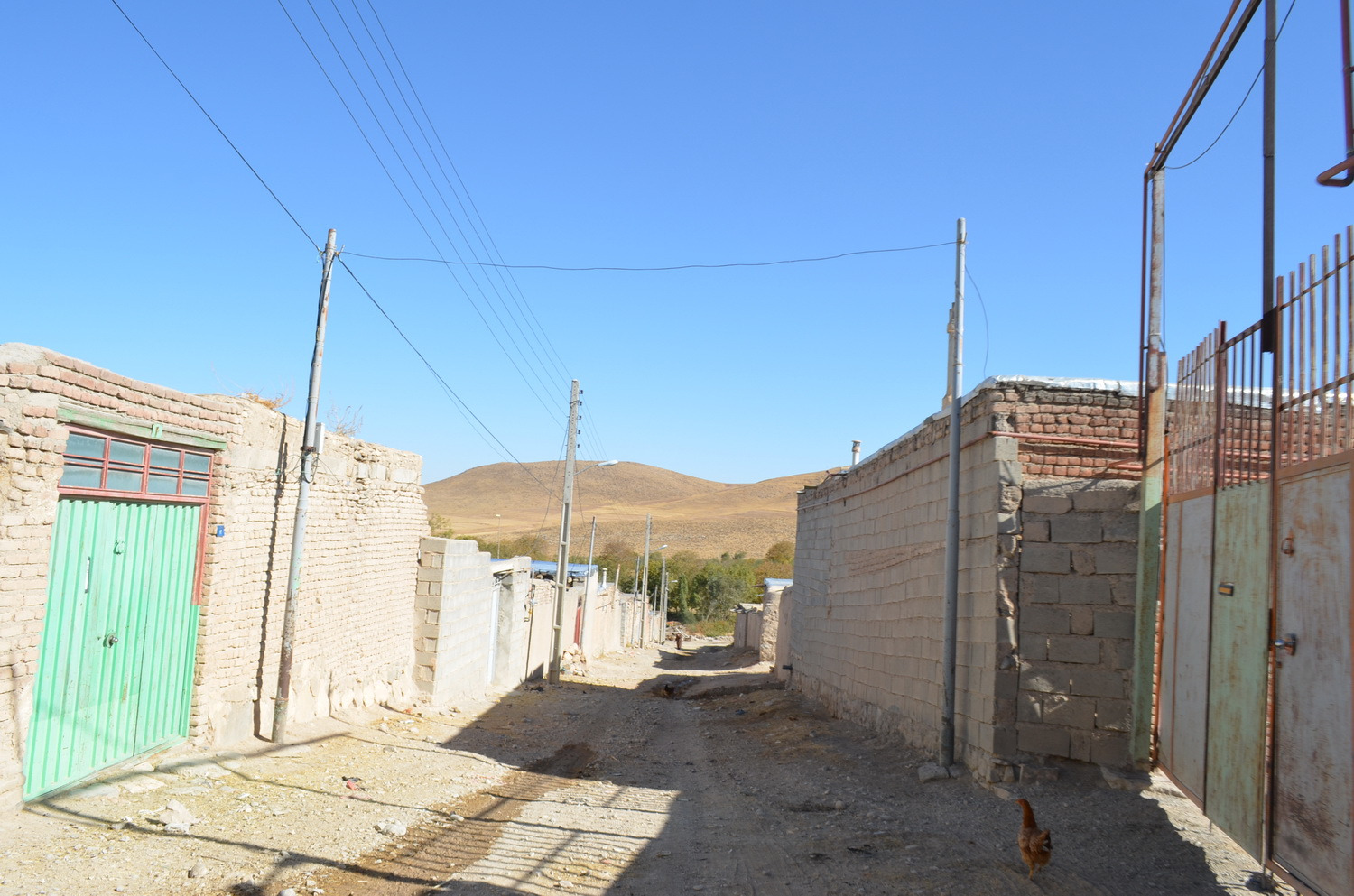

- Location within Iran
- Coordinates: 37°17′25″N 46°21′30″E
- Country: Iran
- Province: East Azerbaijan
- County: Maragheh
- Bakhsh: Central
- Rural District: Sarajuy-ye Shomali

Population (2006)
  - Total: 504
- Time zone: UTC+3:30 (IRST)
  - Summer (DST): UTC+4:30 (IRDT)

Khalifeh Kandi (Persian: خليفه كندي, romanized: Khalīfeh Kandī) is a village in Sarajuy-ye Shomali Rural District, in the Central District of Maragheh County, East Azerbaijan Province, Iran. At the 2006 census, its population was 504, in 111 families.
