= Khalifeh, West Azerbaijan =

Khalifeh خليفه
- Village
- Location within Iran
- Coordinates: 36°44′45″N 45°33′58″E
- Country: Iran
- Province: West Azerbaijan
- County: Mahabad
- Bakhsh: Central
- Rural District: Mokriyan-e Gharbi

Population (2006)
  - Total: 32
- Time zone: UTC+3:30 (IRST)
  - Summer (DST): UTC+4:30 (IRDT)

Khalifeh (Persian: خليفه, also Romanized as Khalīfeh) is a village in Mokriyan-e Gharbi Rural District, in the Central District of Mahabad County, West Azerbaijan Province, Iran. At the 2006 census, its population was 32, in 4 families.
