= Xəlfəlikənd =

- Location within Azerbaijan
- Coordinates: 38°39′N 48°25′E
- Country: Azerbaijan
- Rayon: Lerik
- Municipality: Mistan
- Time zone: UTC+4 (AZT)
  - Summer (DST): UTC+5 (AZT)

Xəlfəlikənd (also, Khalfalikend and Khalifa) is a village in the Lerik Rayon of Azerbaijan. The village forms part of the municipality of Mistan.
