= Machiliwale Shah =

Indian Sufi, saint and scholar

Hazrath Machiliwale Shah
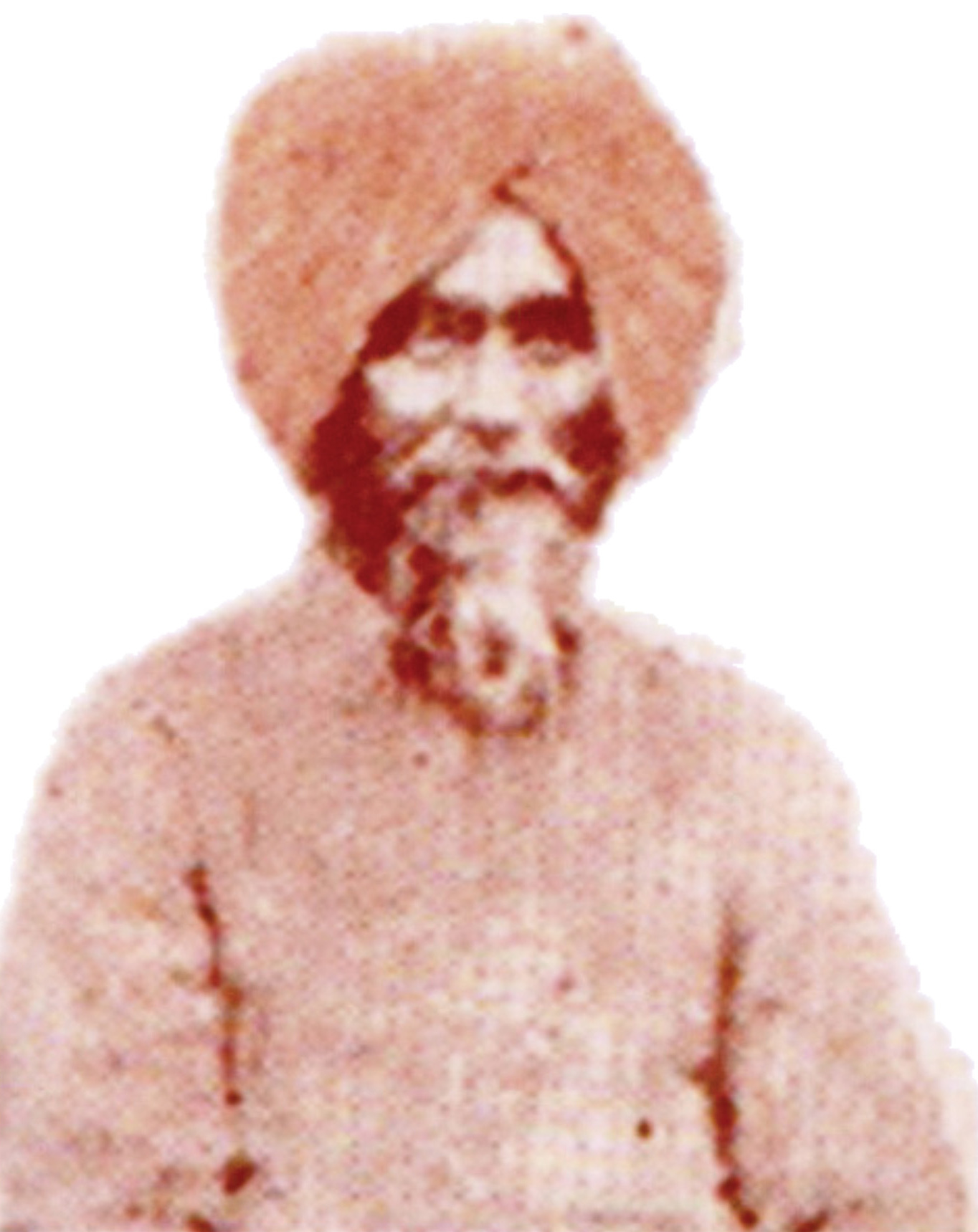
- Photo of Hazrath Machiliwale Shah
- Died: 8 September 1932, 29th Rabi-us-sani, 1351 AH

Religious life
- Religion: Islam
- Sect: Sunni Hanafi
- Profession: Author

Muslim leader
- Based in: Hyderabad, India
- Predecessor: Syed Sultan Mahmoodullah Shah Hussaini
- Successor: Hazrath Ghousi Shah
- Website: https://ghousavishah.com

Machiliwale Shah (died September 8, 1932), also known as Hazrath Syed Kamalullah Shah, was a renowned Muslim Sufi, saint and scholar of the Quadri, Chisti order from Indian sub continent. He was the disciple and the spiritual successor of Hazrath Syed Sultan Mahmoodullah Shah Hussaini (Shaji). His most famous disciple and spiritual successor was Hazrath Ghousi Shah, who in turn became the spiritual master of India's noted.

== Biography ==
Syed Kamalullah Shah was popularly known as Machiliwale Shah. He explained mysteries of life and existence to educated professors and scholars. His residence Ilahi Chaman (Nimboliadda, Kachiguda) became the centre of Ulemas and Sufis. Professors, poets, jurists and bureaucrats would pride themselves, sitting at the feet of Machiliwale Shah. He stressed inner illumination and the value of a pure and simple life.

== Spiritual history ==
Kamalullah Shah (Machiliwale Shah), a businessman from Mysore, surrendered to Syed Mahmoodullah Shah Hussaini when he first met him in Secunderabad. He was initiated (mureed) in the Sufi order and later became the saint's successor (janasheen). When Ghousi Shah came to his khankha, he took him into baiyat and was awarded khilafath instantly. He was later made janasheen by Syed Mahmoodullah Shah Hussaini.

== Visitors ==
Personalities who visited the saint for acquiring knowledge of tasawwuf (Sufism) include:

- Maharaja Kishan Parshad (Prime Minister of Hyd)
- Sir Akbar Hyder Yar Jung
- Nawab Mehdi Yar Jung
- Sir Nizamuth Jung
- Samad Yar Jung, Nawab Sayeed Jung
- Moulana Anwarullah Khan, honorifically known as Fazeelath Jung (founder of Jamia Nizamia)
- Moulana Barkath Ahmed Tonki (famous Aalim-E-Deen)
- Moulana Manazir Ahsan Gilani, Professor ilias Burni.

== Titles ==
- Sirajus Salikeen
- Shaikus Shuyoq
- Shamsul Aarefin

== Khulafa ==
- Moulana Shah Syed Hussain
- Moulana Shah Mohammad Hussain Nazim (Judge) Vanaparthy
- Ghousi Shah
- Moulana Meer Ahmed Hussain Bilyamin
- Syed Barkath Ahmed Tonky
- Moulana Syed Obaidullah Alhussaini
- Moulana Zainul Abedeen

== Death ==
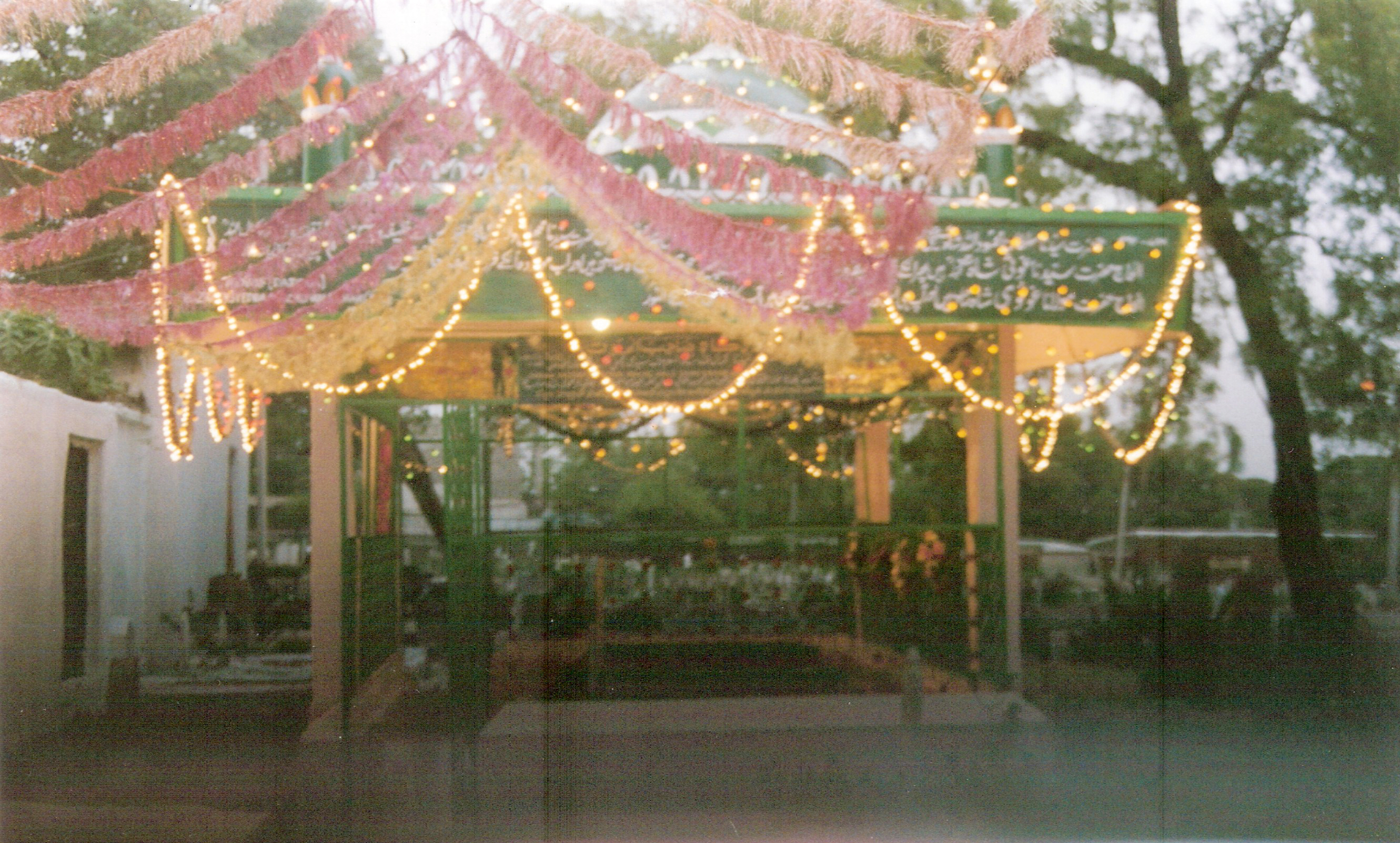
Shrine of Machiliwale Shah

He died on 8 September 1932. His tomb is situated at Elahi Chaman, besides Masjid-E-Elahi, Kachiguda in Hyderabad.

== Urs ==
His annual Urs is organized by his successor Moulana Ghousavi Shah on 29th Rabi-us-sani every year. Moulana Ghousavi Shah and other religious scholars preside over the function every year. The Urs celebrations end with sama (Qawwali Programme) at Baith-Un-Noor, Hyderabad.

== Related ==
- Mahmoodullah Shah
- Kareemullah Shah
- Ghousi Shah
- Moulana Sahvi Shah
- Alhaj Moulana Ghousavi Shah

== Gallery ==
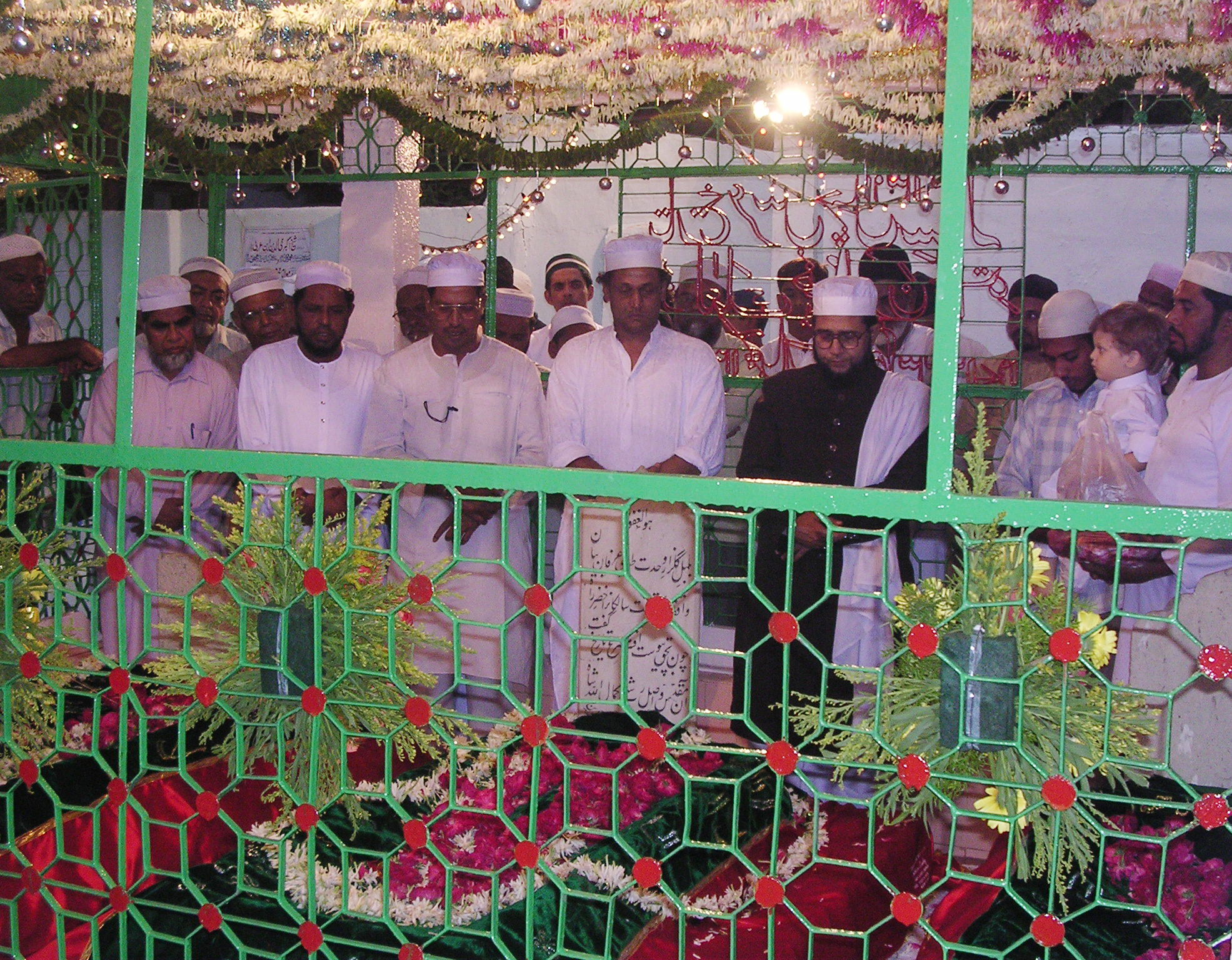
Urs Syed Machiliwale Shah at Kachiguda, Hyderabad, India. Moulana Ghousavi Shah and Shaheed Peeran with others can be seen.
