= Khalifeh, Kermanshah =

Khalifeh خليفه
- Village
- Location within Iran
- Coordinates: 34°52′13″N 47°28′18″E
- Country: Iran
- Province: Kermanshah
- County: Sonqor
- Bakhsh: Kolyai
- Rural District: Satar

Population (2006)
  - Total: 85
- Time zone: UTC+3:30 (IRST)
  - Summer (DST): UTC+4:30 (IRDT)

Khalifeh (Persian: خليفه, also Romanized as Khalīfeh; also known as Khalīfa) is a village in Satar Rural District, Kolyai District, Sonqor County, Kermanshah Province, Iran. At the 2006 census, its population was 85, in 25 families.
