= Khalifeh Kandi-ye Hatam =

Khalifeh Kandi-ye Hatam خليفه كندي حاتم
- Village
- Location within Iran
- Coordinates: 37°34′10″N 46°46′18″E
- Country: Iran
- Province: East Azerbaijan
- County: Hashtrud
- Bakhsh: Central
- Rural District: Soluk

Population (2006)
  - Total: 228
- Time zone: UTC+3:30 (IRST)
  - Summer (DST): UTC+4:30 (IRDT)

Khalifeh Kandi-ye Hatam (Persian: خليفه كندي حاتم, also Romanized as Khalīfeh Kandī-ye Ḩātam; also known as Khalīfeh Kandī) is a village in Soluk Rural District, in the Central District of Hashtrud County, East Azerbaijan Province, Iran. At the 2006 census, its population was 228, in 45 families.
