= Peter Khalife =

Football agent and former player

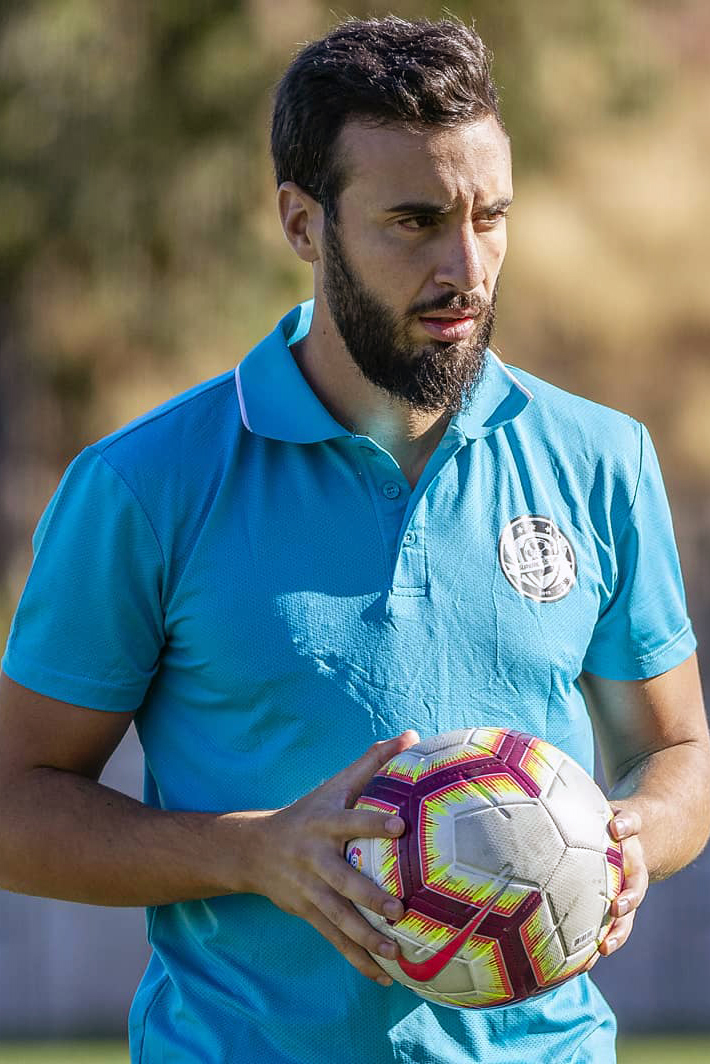
- Khalife with Superior Squad International in 2019

Personal information
- Date of birth: 29 January 1990 (age 36)
- Place of birth: Limassol, Cyprus
- Height: 1.85 m (6 ft 1 in)
- Position: Winger

Senior career*
Years	Team	Apps	(Gls)
2014–2015	Racing Beirut	1	(0)
2015	Sagesse	0	(0)

Managerial career
- 2013–2015: Racing Beirut Academy
- 2015–2019: Superior Squad International
- 2018–2019: Omonia Academy
- * Club domestic league appearances and goals

Peter Khalife (Arabic: بيتر خليفة, Lebanese Arabic pronunciation: [ˈpiːter xaˈliːfe]; born 29 January 1990) is a football agent and former player. Born in Cyprus, he holds Lebanese and Swedish citizenship.

Khalife is the founder and owner of Superior Squad Sports Management and Superior Squad Group. His activities include player representation, talent identification and youth development, with the group operating across Europe, the Middle East and North Africa, and other regions. He is also an agent with Anthem Sports Management, covering Cyprus, Lebanon, the United States, Greece, Malta, the United Arab Emirates and other markets.

== Early life ==
Born on 29 January 1990 in Limassol, Cyprus, to Lebanese parents, Khalife was raised in Sweden. His parents originated from Mayfouq in the Byblos District of Lebanon. He holds both Lebanese and Swedish citizenship.

== Playing career ==
Khalife began playing football at the age of seven. He played for Lebanese Premier League club Racing Beirut during the 2014–15 season. He joined Sagesse in October 2015.

== Coaching career ==
Khalife has a UEFA B Licence. Khalife coached at Racing Beirut in 2014–15 during his playing career, and in 2015 established Superior Squad International, a youth football project in Lebanon. He also worked with Omonia's academy in Cyprus during the late 2010s and led Superior Squad to victory at the 2019 Omonia Cup.

== Agency career ==
Khalife founded Superior Squad Sports Management (SSSM) in 2015. The agency began in Lebanon and subsequently expanded internationally, particularly into Cyprus and other European markets. By 2025, Lebanese media reported that the agency represented more than 300 young players, and operated in more than 10 countries.

In 2021, Khalife was listed as the director of Superior Squad Sports Management Pty Cy Ltd, registered in Cyprus. Superior Squad Marketing Ltd, another company associated with Khalife, was registered in Cyprus in 2023, with Khalife listed as director and secretary.

The agency has represented players in several countries. In 2022, Khalife reported that the agency had completed 22 transfers involving professional contracts during the summer transfer window.

Khalife has also been involved in developing pathways for Lebanese players into European football. In 2025, Lebanese media reported the moves of Karim Mekkaoui to Omonia Aradippou, Jimmy Kazan to Enosis Paralimni, and Karim Jaafar to Rayo Vallecano, with Khalife involved in their development or representation. Jaafar joined Rayo Vallecano's youth setup in 2025 after developing with Superior Squad Academy and working with Khalife.

Khalife has also worked internationally with youth-development projects. In 2023, he was identified as the international marketing representative for the Egyptian Stars of Egypt project when goalkeeper Mohamed El Shahed joined Rayo Vallecano. In 2025, Superior Squad announced a partnership with The Maker, a football project led by former Egyptian international Mido, to develop pathways for Egyptian players towards European clubs, particularly in Cyprus, Spain and Georgia.

Khalife is listed as an agent with Anthem Sports Management, where he is responsible for player scouting and representation across Cyprus, Lebanon, the United States, Greece, Malta, the United Arab Emirates and other markets.

== Personal life ==
Khalife has lived in Larnaca, Cyprus, and speaks Arabic, English, French, Greek and Swedish.
