= Lina Khalifeh =

Jordanian martial artist

Lina Khalifeh (born June 18 1984) is a Jordanian black belt taekwondo champion, after winning medals for the Jordanian team, she decided to extend her career past the martial arts. In 2010, after she found out that one of her friends was attacked and beaten up by her father and brother, she decided to start giving mixed martial arts self-defence classes from her parents' basement, building up on that, she opened her own self-defence center named “She Fighter” in 2012 to teach women in Amman, Jordan, to defend themselves since sexual harassment and acts of aggression were common in Jordan.

== Early life ==
Khalifeh started to over-train, injuring herself in the process. At the age of 22, she torn her ACL, and after 2 surgeries, she did not recover well. Doctors informed her that she could not do martial arts anymore. She described this period as “the lowest point of my life”

== Career ==
Khalifeh has also worked for four years as a marketing manager in her family's firm in Jordan, where she manufactured educational items (white boards, black boards, electronic boards, and so on) and marketed them abroad.

== Achievements ==
Some of the Conferences Khalifeh was invited to speak at: The Business of Fashion Summit 2019, The Economic World Forum 2019, Women in the World Summit 2019, Dragon Fly 2019 Thailand, European Development Summit 2018, European Parliament 2015, One Young World 2016, Concordia Summit (Virtual) 2020, Los Angeles Tribunate (Virtual) 2020 and BMO Bank (Virtual) 2020.

Khalifeh was also selected by the She Entrepreneur program to present her work to the Swedish royal family. She was one of the "leaders of social change" presented by Barack Obama at the White House. She was featured at a TED conference as part of the TEDWomen conferences to talk about her work.

== Recognition ==
Khalifeh was recognized as one of the BBC's 100 women of 2017.
