= Khalifa =

Successor of Muhammad

Khalifa خَليفة
- Abu Bakr, the first Khalifa
- Pronunciation: Arabic: [xaliːfa]
- Gender: Male
- Language: Arabic

Origin
- Meaning: Leader, Successor, Steward, Deputy

Other names
- Alternative spelling: Khalifah, Caliph

Khalifa or Khalifah (Arabic: خليفة, romanized: Khalīfa; commonly "caliph" in English) is an Islamic title which literally means "successor" or "deputy of the God". It most commonly refers to the leader of a caliphate, but can also be used as a title among various Islamic religious groups and others. There were four Rashidun caliphs after Muhammad died, beginning with Abu Bakr. The Khilafah (or Caliphate) was then contested and gave rise to the eventual division of Islam into two sects, the Sunni and the Shi'a, who interpret the word Khalifa in differently nuanced ways.

== Khalifa (Caliphs) ==
The earliest holders of Khalifa (Caliph) title are:

No.	Khalifa	Reign
1	Abu Bakr	8 June 632 – 23 August 634 (2 years, 77 days)
2	Umar	23 August 634 – c. 6 November 644 (10 years, 73 days)
3	Uthman	6 November 644 – 17 June 656 (11 years, 225 days)
4	Ali	17 June 656 – 28 January 661 (4 years, 226 days)

== See also ==
- Emir
- Imam
- Malik
- Sheikh
- Sayyid
- Sultan
