= Ghousi Shah =

Indian Muslim Sufi (1893–1954)

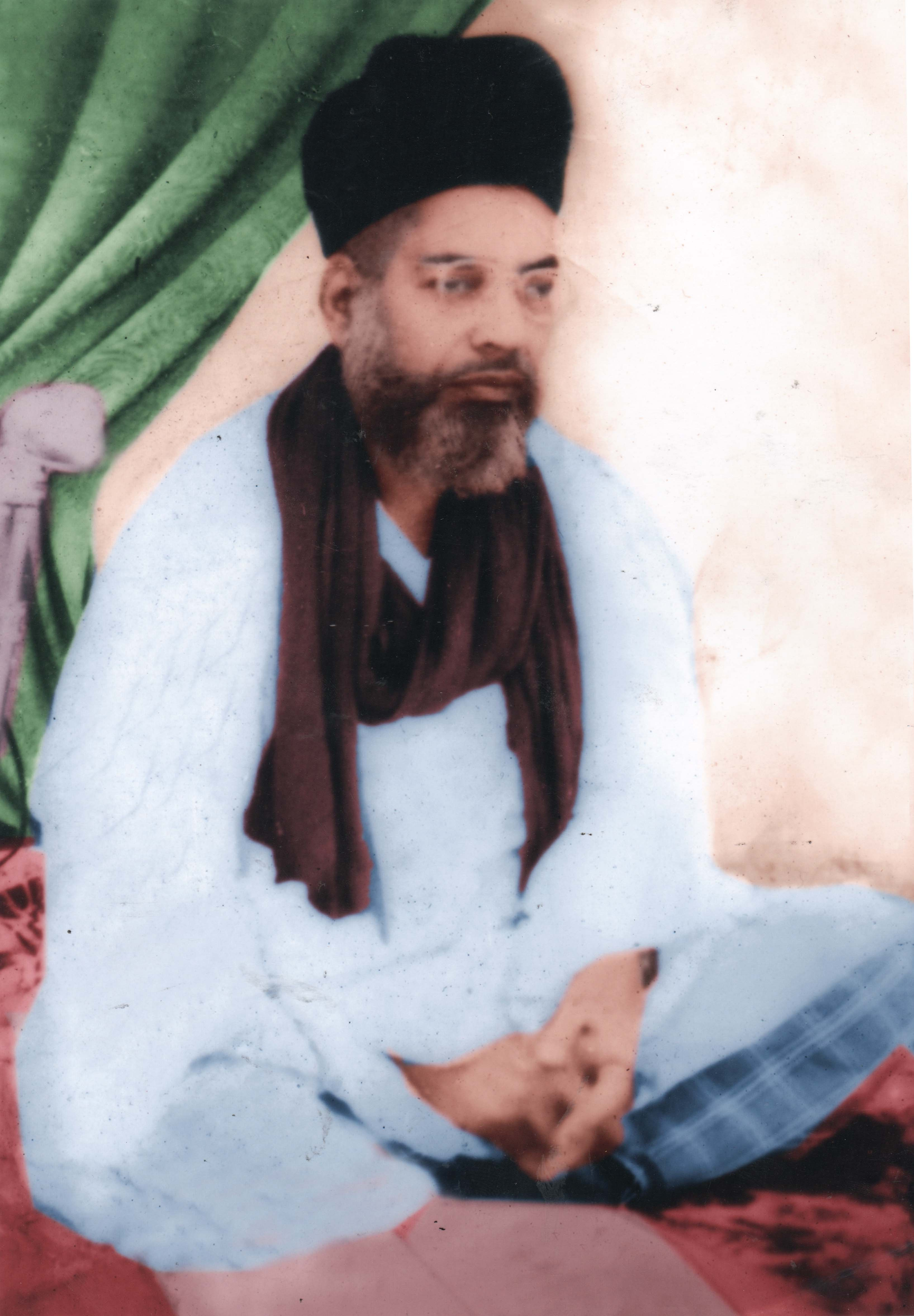

Personal life
- Born: 1 July 1893 CE (16 Dhul Hijjah 1310 AH) Hyderabad, India
- Died: 6 June 1954 CE (4 Shawwal 1373 AH)

Religious life
- Religion: Islam
- Sect: Sunni Hanafi
- Profession: Author

Muslim leader
- Based in: Hyderabad, India
- Predecessor: Machiliwale Shah
- Successor: Moulana Sahvi Shah

Alhaj Moulana Peer Ghousi Shah (Urdu: حضرت مولانا غوثى شاه) (1 July 1893 – 6 June 1954) was a renowned Muslim Sufi saint and poet from Hyderabad, India. He was the Janesheen (successor) to Machiliwale Shah in the Sufi lineage.

== Biography ==
Born on to 1 July 1893 in Hyderabad, India, Ghousi Shah was a Sunni Muslim adhering to the Hanafi school of thought. He received his education in Urdu, Arabic, and Persian under the guidance of Maulana Hameed-Ullah, studying Islamic sciences like Fiqh, Hadith, and Tafsir.

Four years before his death, in a speech to his disciples, he appointed his son, Moulana Sahvi Shah, as his spiritual successor, stating that this decision was a divine will.

== Books ==
- Kanze Maktoom (Sharha Mathnawi Bahrul Uloom)
- Majoone Mohammadi
- Jawahere Ghousi
- Maqsad-E-Bayet (Discusses bayet – taking a spiritual pledge, including its purpose, virtues, necessity, and kinds).
- Tayyebat-E-Ghousi (A collection of poems – Hamd, Naat, Manqabat, Rubaiyat—with thumris on the Prophet and Meraj).
- Noor-Un-Noor (A book on the interpretation of Wahadatul Wujood).
- Kalima-E-Tayaba The book discusses the significance of Kalima-e-Tayyiba, a fundamental concept in Islam, as well as topics such as self-awareness, divine awareness, revelation, and prophethood.
- Falahe Muslims
- Maeete Elah

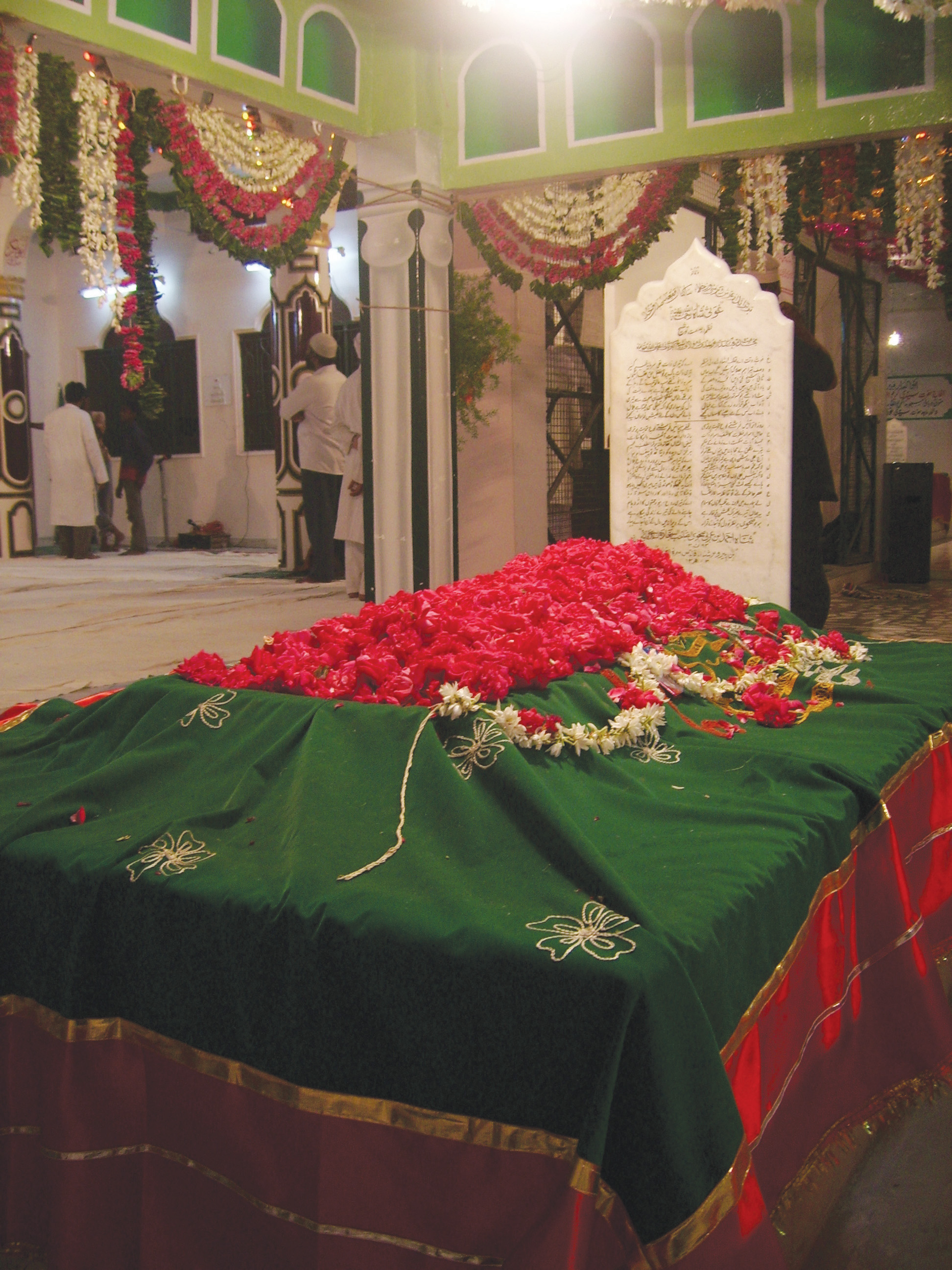
Mazaar Shareef of Ghousi Shah

== Death ==
Ghousi Shah died on 6 June 1954 in Hyderabad, corresponding to the date 4 Shawwal 1373 AH in the Islamic calendar. He was buried in his father's mosque, Masjid-e-Kareemullah Shah, located at 15-6-341, Begum Bazaar, Hyderabad, India.

== Urs ==
His annual Urs is organized by his successor, Maulana Ghousavi Shah, every year on 4 Shawwal. Maulana Ghousavi Shah (Secretary General of The Conference of World Religions and President of the All India Muslim Conference) and other religious scholars preside over the function. The Urs celebrations conclude with sama (Qawwali program) at Baith-Un-Noor, Hyderabad.

== See also ==
- Moinuddin Chishti
- Nizamuddin Awliya
