= List of dargahs in Tamil Nadu =

This is a list of notable Islamic shrines in Tamil Nadu, a state of India.

In Tamil, dargah is sometimes transliterated as darga.

== Table ==
Name	Location	Remarks
Erwadi Dargah		contains the tomb of Qutbus Sultan Syed Ibrahim Shaheed Badshah
Hazrat Noor Mohammad Shah Dargah, also known as Panruti Darga	Podakkudi	contains the tomb of Hazrat Noor Mohammad Shah
Kalifa e Nathar Wali	Trichy	contains the tomb of Shams Mansoor Shams Peer
Kattupalli	Ervadi	a compound of dargahs
Kovalam Darga or Kovalam Darga	Chennai	contains the tomb of Tamim al-Ansari
Kuangudi Mastan Sahib Darga	Tondiarpet	contains the tomb of Kunangudi Masthan Sahib
Lalpet Dargah	Cuddalore	contains the tomb of Sheikh Shams-ul-Aarifeen Qutb-ul-Aqtab Khwaja Dil Nawaz FaizeeShah Noori Chisti-ul-Qadiri
Muthupet dargha		contains the tomb of Sheik Dawood Kamlil Valyullah
Nagore Dargah	Nagore, in the Nagapattinam district	contains the tomb of Syed Shahul Hamid Qadir Wali
Pallapatti dargah		contains the tomb of Sheik Abdul Kadhar Avliya
Peer Mohamed Appa Dargah	Thuckalay, in the Kanyakumari district	contains the tomb of Peer Mohamed Appa
Qutbus Sultan Syed Mohammad Shaheed Dargah	Kilakarai	contains the tomb of the cousin brother of Ervadi Sultan Syed Ibrahim Badushah
Sarkarai Bawa Dargah	located in Oddanchathiram, in the Dindigul district	contains the tomb of Sarkarai Bawa
Sheikh Abdullah Avuliyah R.A Dargah	Piranmalai, in the Sivagangai district	contains the tomb of Sheikh Abdullah Avuliyah R.A
Sheikh Sadaqathullahil Khahiri Dargah	Keelakarai, in the Ramanathapuram district	contains the tomb of Sheikh Sadaqathullahil Khahiri
Sheikh Umarul Khahiri Valiyyullah Dargah	Kayal Pattanam	contains the tomb of Sheikh Umarul Khahiri Valiyyullah
Sheikh Keelakarai Thaika Sahib and Imamul Aroos Mappilai Labbai Alim Dargah	Keelakarai, in the Ramanathapuram district	contains the tombs of Sheikh Keelakarai Thaika Sahib and Imamul Aroos Mappilai Labbai Alim
Athankarai Dargah	located in Atthangarai, in the Tirunelveli district	contains the tomb of Syed Ali Fatimah R.A
Syek Appa Sheik Amma Oliyulla Dargah	Maavoor, in the Ramanathapuram district	contains the tomb of Syek Appa Sheik Amma Oliyulla
Thiruparankundram Dargah	Thiruparankundram Malai, in the Madurai district	contains the tomb of Sultan Sikkandhar Badushah
Trichy Dargah		contains the tomb of Dada Hayat Mir Qalandar Table Aalam Badshah Nathar Wali Sohrawardi
unnamed	Madurai	contains the tomb of Melakkal Kanavai Syed Varusai Ibrahim Sahib R.A
Yarab Dargah	Denkanikottai, in the Krishnagiri district	

== See also ==
- Islam in India
- Sufism in India
