= Nagore Durgha Sheriff =

Dargah in Penang, Malaysia

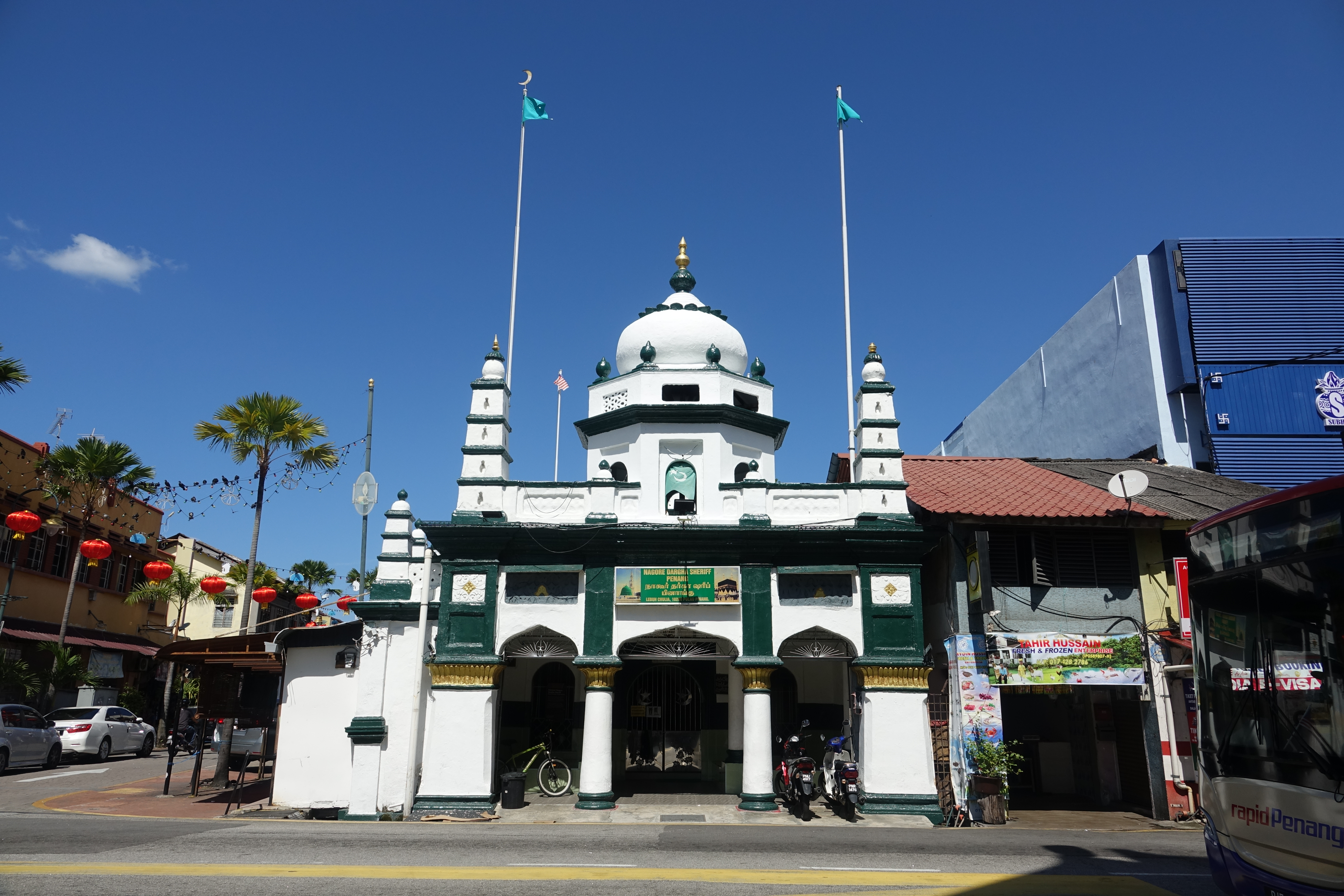
- The dargah in 2024

- Location of the dragh in Penang

Religion
- Affiliation: Sunni Islam
- Sect: Sufism
- Ecclesiastical or organizational status: Dargah
- Status: Active (as a shrine)
- Dedication: Syed Shahul Hamid

Location
- Location: Chulia Street and King Street, George Town, Penang
- Country: Malaysia
- Interactive map of Nagore Durgha Sheriff
- Coordinates: 5°24′59″N 100°20′20″E

Architecture
- Type: Mosque architecture
- Style: Indo-Islamic
- Completed: c. 1800

Specifications
- Dome: One
- Minaret: Four

The Nagore Durgha Sheriff is an Sufi dargah complex incorporating a Sufi shrine and mausoleum, that was completed in the early 19th century, located at the junction of Chulia Street and King Street, George Town, in Penang, Malaysia.

== History ==
The shrine is dedicated to Syed Shahul Hamid, a 13th century Sufi saint of Nagore, Tamil Nadu, India. It was built in c. 1800 by Tamil Muslim traders from Thanjavur who settled in Penang, and brought the tradition of the saint with them.

== Architecture ==
Described as the oldest, Muslim Indian shrine in Penang with its original structure preserved, its architecture is characteristic of the south Indian style. Rectangular in shape, at each corner is a small, tapered minaret separated by a lattice screen, with a burji indicating the plinth level of the building.

The front entrance has four arches spanning a portico through which worshippers pass to enter the prayer hall. Two onion-shaped domes are each surmounted by an inverted lotus and an Indian kalasha. One wall has a built-in arcade where there are several shops selling Muslim prayer items. There was originally a well situated at the shrine.

== See also ==
- Sufism in India
- List of mosques in India
