= Nadir Shah (disambiguation) =

Nadir Shah or Nader Shah was an 18th-century ruler of Iran.

Nadir Shah may also refer to:

- Nadir Shah (umpire) (1964–2021), Bangladeshi cricket umpire
- Nadir Shah (cricketer) (born 2000), Pakistani cricketer
- Nadir Shah (actor) or Nadirshah, Indian actor and film director
- Nadir Shah (Muslim saint) or Nathar Shah (969–1038), Indian Muslim mystic and preacher
  - Nadir Shah Mosque, Tiruchirappalli, Tamil Nadu, India
- Mohammad Nadir Shah (1883-1933), King of Afghanistan from 1929 to 1933
