= Nagore (disambiguation) =

Nagore is a town in Tamil Nadu, India.

Nagore may also refer to:

- Nagore (footballer) (born 1980), Spanish football player
- Nagore Calderón (born 1993), Spanish football player
- Nagore E. M. Hanifa (1925–2015), Indian lyricist, playback singer and politician
- Nagore Gabellanes (born 1973), Spanish field hockey player
- Nagore Shahul Hamid, 16th-century Indian Sufi saint and preacher
  - Nagore Dargah, his dargah (shrine) in Nagore, Tamil Nadu, India
  - Nagore Durgha, Singapore, another shrine dedicated to him in Singapore
- Txomin Nagore (born 1974), Slyricist, playback singer and politicianpanish footballer

== See also ==
- Nagoor (disambiguation)
- Nagaur or Nagor and Nagore, a city in Rajasthan, India
  - Nagaur district
  - Nagaur (Lok Sabha constituency)
  - Nagaur (Rajasthan Assembly constituency)
  - Nagori, a breed of cattle
  - Nagori (caste), a Muslim caste
  - Safdar Nagori, Indian militant
  - Shaikh Mubarak Nagori, father of Abu'l-Fazl ibn Mubarak and Faizi
