= Kalifa Masthan Sahib Qadri =

11th Nagore Dargah Hereditary Kalifa

Kalifa Masthan Sahib Qadri Hereditary Kalifa, Sajjada Nasheen, Gaddi Nasheen, Spiritual Head, leading Priest of the Nagore Dargah
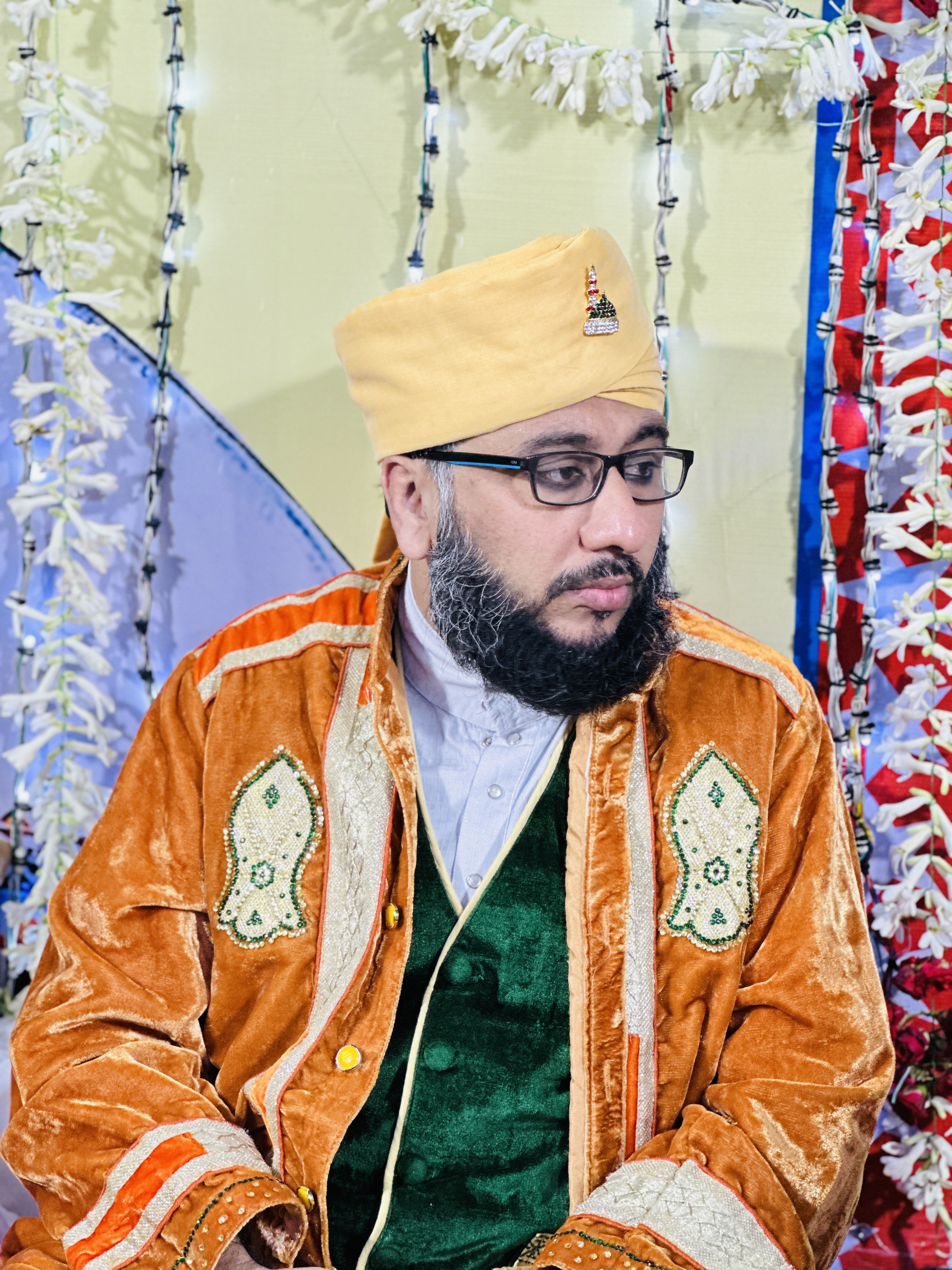

Nagore Dargah Kalifa

First Trustee of Nagore Dargah
- Incumbent
- Assumed office 2012
- Preceded by: Mohammad Kalifa Sahib Qadri

Personal details
- Born: Kalifa Masthan Sahib Qadri; 13 May 1982 (age 44) Nagore, India
- Children: One Son - Ahmad Kalifa Sahib
- Committees: Board of Trustees in Nagore Dargah
- Website: nagoredargahshariff.com nagoredargahkalifa.com

Kalifa Masthan Sahib Qadri (born 13 May 1982) is the current and 11th Nagore Dargah Hereditary Kalifa (Leading Priest). He is also called Sajjada Nasheen and Gaddi Nasheen in India. He became First Trustee (Board of Trustees) of Nagore Dargah following the death of his father, Mohammad Kalifa Sahib Qadri death in 2012.

== Name and usage ==
"Kalifa Masthan Sahib Qadri" is his full personal name, with "Kalifa" forming an integral part of the name given to him by his parents at birth. In addition to functioning as a hereditary spiritual responsibility within the Nagore Dargah tradition, "Kalifa" is also used as a personal given name.

Across Islamic societies worldwide, including South India, the term "Kalifa" (also spelled "Khalifa") is used both as a personal name and as a designation associated with leadership or responsibility. In Tamil Nadu usage, the spelling "Kalifa" is commonly preferred. Independent sources, including court records and media reports, consistently refer to him as "Kalifa Masthan Sahib Qadri", indicating that the term is not employed merely as an honorific title in his case, but as part of his commonly used and officially recorded name.

== Early life and family background ==
Kalifa Masthan Sahib Qadri was born on 13 May 1982 in Nagore, Tamil Nadu, into the historic hereditary Kalifa lineage of the Nagore Dargah. He is the son of Mohammad Kalifa Sahib Qadri, the 10th Hereditary Kalifa, who served from 1982 to 2012.

From an early age, he received guidance in the religious traditions, spiritual duties, and ceremonial practices associated with the dargah. He received early religious instruction within the Nagore Dargah tradition.He received early religious instruction within the Nagore Dargah tradition. Following the passing of his father in 2012, he succeeded to the position of the 11th Hereditary Kalifa, continuing the unbroken spiritual lineage associated with the custodianship of Hazrat Shahul Hameed Qadir Wali Sarkar (Nagore Andavar). As the hereditary successor, he oversees the rituals, traditions, and ceremonial responsibilities linked to the saint’s legacy.

He also holds the position of First Trustee of the Board of Trustees of Nagore Dargah, as defined under the court-approved administrative scheme.

As per the hereditary succession tradition of the Nagore Dargah, the lineage continues through his son, SahibZada Ahmad Kalifa Sahib.
