= Nagoor =

Nagoor may refer to the following places in India:

- Nagore, a town in Tamil Nadu
- Nagoor, Medak, a village in Medak district, Telangana
- Nagoor, Aurad, a village in Aurad, Bidar, Karnataka
- Nagoor, Bhalki, a village in Bhalki, Bidar, Karnataka
- Nagoor, a rural locality in Byndoor, Karnataka, India

== See also ==
- Nagur, a city in Iran
- Nagaur, a city in Rajasthan, India
- Nagore (disambiguation)
