= Calafia (disambiguation) =

Calafia, or Califia, is the fictional Queen of California in the novel Las sergas de Esplandián.

Calafia may also refer to:

== Entertainment ==
- Calafia, a planet in the fictional Uplift Universe by David Brin
- Calafia (album), a 1985 jazz album by Gerald Wilson's Orchestra
- Califia (novel), a multimedia hypertext novel by Marjorie Luesebrink

== People ==
- Patrick Califia (born 1954), American non-fiction writer

== Places ==
- Calafia Beach Park, a surfing location in San Clemente, California
- Calafia Island, a submerged island between Santa Rosae and the California coast
- Calafia Valley, a wine growing region in Baja California, Mexico
- Plaza Calafia, a bullring in Mexicali, Baja California, Mexico

== Other ==
- Calafia Airlines, a regional airline of Mexico
- CALAFIA, the California Cooperative Latin American Collection Development Group, affiliated with the Seminar on the Acquisition of Latin American Library Materials
- Califia, a genus of Orbiniidae worms

== See also ==
- Califa (disambiguation)
- Kalifa (disambiguation)
- Khalifa (disambiguation)
