= Califa =

Califa may refer to:

- Califa, a California library consortium, see List of Library consortia
- Califa, California, in Madera County
- CALIFA, the Calar Alto Legacy Integral Field Area Survey, an astronomical project of the Calar Alto Observatory
- Caliph, leader and ruler of a caliphate

== See also ==
- Calafia (disambiguation)
- Kalifa (disambiguation)
- Khalifa (disambiguation)
