= Nagaura Station =

Nagaura Station (長浦駅) is the name of two train stations in Japan:

- Nagaura Station (Aichi)
- Nagaura Station (Chiba)

== See also ==
- Nagore (disambiguation)
