= Meerapalli =

Mosque in Puducherry, India

- மீராபள்ளி
- Location of the mosque in Puducherry

Religion
- Affiliation: Sunni Islam
- Sect: Sufism
- Ecclesiastical or organizational status: Mosque
- Status: Active
- Dedication: Meeran Saheb

Location
- Location: Yanam Vengadasalam Pillai St, Pondicherry, Puducherry
- Country: India
- Interactive map of Meerapalli
- Coordinates: 11°55′41″N 79°49′48″E

Architecture
- Type: Mosque architecture
- Style: Indo-Islamic; Gothic Islamic
- Founder: Acrot Nawabs
- Completed: 18th century
- Minaret: Two

Meerapalli (Tamil: மீராபள்ளி, lit. 'Meeran Mosque'; French: Mirapalli) is a Sufi mosque in Pondicherry, in the union territory of Puducherry, India. It was constructed during the first quarter of the 18th century and is the oldest standing mosque in Pondicherry.

== History ==
The renowned Arab navigator, Sulaiman Al Mahri, mentioned the port of Bandikeri during the later part of 15th century or the first part of 16th century along the Coromandel Coast, which was identified as Pondicherry in later days. A Muslim settlement was already there.

== Architecture ==
The mosque was built by the Acrot Nawabs in the 18th century in a mix of the Indo-Islamic and Gothic Islamic styles. Adjacent to the mosque is the grave of its founder, Sufi saint Meeran Saheb, (Note: Meeran was born as Qutb al-Majeed Fard al-Waheed Imam al-Awliya as-Syed Abdul Qadir Shah al-Hamid Khadir Wali Suhrawardi, bestowed with various titles, including Nagore Shahul Hamid, Nagore Andavar (meaning Ruler of Nagore), Qadir Wali and Ganj-e-Sawai. Evidence, however, indicates that he was buried in the Nagore Dargah.) and Suubhi Errai Perriar Mullah. New extensions have been built surrounding the original structure, including a small madrassa.

== See also ==
- Islam in India
- List of mosques in India
