= Khuthbapalli =

Sunni mosque in Puducherry, India

- குத்பாபள்ளி
- Location of the mosque in Puducherry

Religion
- Affiliation: Sunni Islam
- Ecclesiastical or organizational status: Friday mosque
- Status: Active

Location
- Location: Mullah Street, Pondicherry, Puducherry
- Country: India
- Interactive map of Khuthbapalli
- Coordinates: 11°57′43″N 79°50′14″E

Architecture
- Type: Mosque architecture
- Style: Indo-Islamic; Indo-French
- Established: c. 17th century (in White Town)
- Completed: c. 17th century (1st structure); 18th century (2nd structure); 1948 (reconstructed)

Specifications
- Dome: Two (maybe more)
- Minaret: Two (maybe more)

Khuthbapalli (Tamil: குத்பாபள்ளி; French: Couttoubapalli or Cottoubapalli), also known as Jamia Mosque Khuthbapalli, the Kuthba Mosque and the Khuthbha Mosque, is a Sunni Friday mosque, located in Pondicherry, the capital city of the union territory of Puducherry, India. Khutbah literally means the Friday sermon given in a mosque. Khuthbapalli holds Friday prayers in addition to the regular prayers.

== History ==
Khuthbapalli is claimed to be the first mosque in Pondicherry, first sited in White Town. According to the Dutch map of Pondicherry Fort in 1693, there were two mosques were located in the Fort. One is believed to be Khuthbapalli and the other to be Meerapalli. During the first half of the 18th century Meerapalli was relocated to its present location, whereas Khuthbapalli remained in the Western part of White Town until the destruction of the White Town by the English in 1761. The current structure was built in the 18th century.

In 1948, French soldiers of Dupleix attempted to destroy this ancient mosque, but were stopped in the process by local Muslims and by the timely intervention of Abdul Rahman. The French renamed the rue De la monnaie to rue Victor Simonel. Rue De la monnaie was known as rue De la mosquee during the governorship of Joseph François Dupleix. Rue De la mosquee means "Mosque Street" in English.

== Architecture ==
The mosque's architecture is a synthesis between Indo-Islamic and Indo-French design elements. Its minarets, domes, and pond collectively create an aura of tranquilly in both its aesthetic beauty and historical significance.

Inside the mosque there is a dargah of Moulla Saiullbum.

Khuthbapalli functions as the Markaz of the Pondicherry Chapter of Tablighi Jamaat.

== See also ==
- Islam in India
- List of mosques in India
