= Nadir Shah Mosque =

Mosque in Tiruchirappalli, Tamil Nadu, India

- நத்தர்ஷா பள்ளிவாசல்

Religion
- Affiliation: Islam
- Ecclesiastical or organizational status: Mosque
- Status: Active
- Dedication: Nadir Shah

Location
- Location: Tiruchirappalli, Tamil Nadu
- Country: India
- Interactive map of Nadir Shah Mosque

Architecture
- Type: Mosque architecture
- Founder: Carnatic Sultanate
- Completed: 17th to 19th centuries
- Shrines: Two: Nawab Muhammad Ali Khan Wallajah; General Chanda Sahib

The Nadir Shah Mosque (Tamil: நத்தர்ஷா பள்ளிவாசல்) is a mosque situated in the city of Tiruchirappalli in the state of Tamil Nadu, India. It is situated in the western part of the city close to the Tiruchirappalli Fort Railway Station.

The mosque was built by rulers of the Carnatic Sultanate. The mosque is believed to contain the remains of the Nawab Muhammad Ali Khan Wallajah of the Carnatic and the headless body of the general Chanda Sahib who was beheaded by the Maratha king of the Thanjavur Maratha kingdom, Pratap Singh. The mosque was named on honour of the Muslim cleric Babayya Nadir Shah, whose tomb lies within its precincts.

== See also ==
- Islam in India
- List of mosques in India
- Nadir Shah, also spelled as Nathar Shah, a Muslim saint
