= Athankarai Dargah =

Sufi dargah and mosque in Tirunelveli district, Tamil Nadu, India

- ஆத்தங்கரை தர்கா
- Location of the mosque and dargah in Tamil Nadu

Religion
- Affiliation: Sunni Islam
- Sect: Sufism
- Festival: Kanthuri/Kanduri
- Ecclesiastical or organizational status: Dargah and mosque
- Status: Active

Location
- Location: Athankarai Pallivasal, Tirunelveli district, Tamil Nadu
- Country: India
- Interactive map of Athankarai Dargah
- Coordinates: 8°15′44″N 77°48′01″E

Architecture
- Type: Mosque architecture
- Style: Indo-Islamic
- Dome: 2

Athankarai Dargah (Tamil: ஆத்தங்கரை தர்கா), also known as Athankarai Pallivasal, is a prominent Sufi dargah and mosque located in Athankarai Pallivasal village in Tirunelveli district, Tamil Nadu, India. The shrine is known for its annual Kanthuri/Kanduri festival, a major regional religious event attracting thousands of devotees.

== Description ==
The dargah's two domes mark the tombs traditionally attributed to Sufi saints Hazrat Syed Ali Fathima (Rali) and her Hazrat Shegu Muhammad (Oli). The complex functions as both a mosque and a shrine, serving the spiritual needs of the surrounding Muslim community and pilgrims from across southern Tamil Nadu. Syed Ali Fathima is also called Fathimasa bibi or Athangarai Nachiyar Amma.

Local tradition highlights the site as a place of solace for those seeking spiritual healing and blessings.

== Kanthuri/Kanduri Festival ==
The annual Kanthuri/Kanduri festival is the principal celebration at Athankarai Dargah. It typically spans two days and includes Quran recitation sessions, flag hoisting ceremonies (kodi yeṟṟuthal), processions, Mawlid chanting, and lectures by Islamic scholars. The festival draws large crowds from Tirunelveli, Thoothukudi, and Kanyakumari districts.

Evening gatherings often include devotional songs, community supplications (duʿā), and distribution of neerchchai (blessed water).

== See also ==
- Nagore Dargah
- Islam in Tamil Nadu
- Sufism in India
