= Sufism in India =

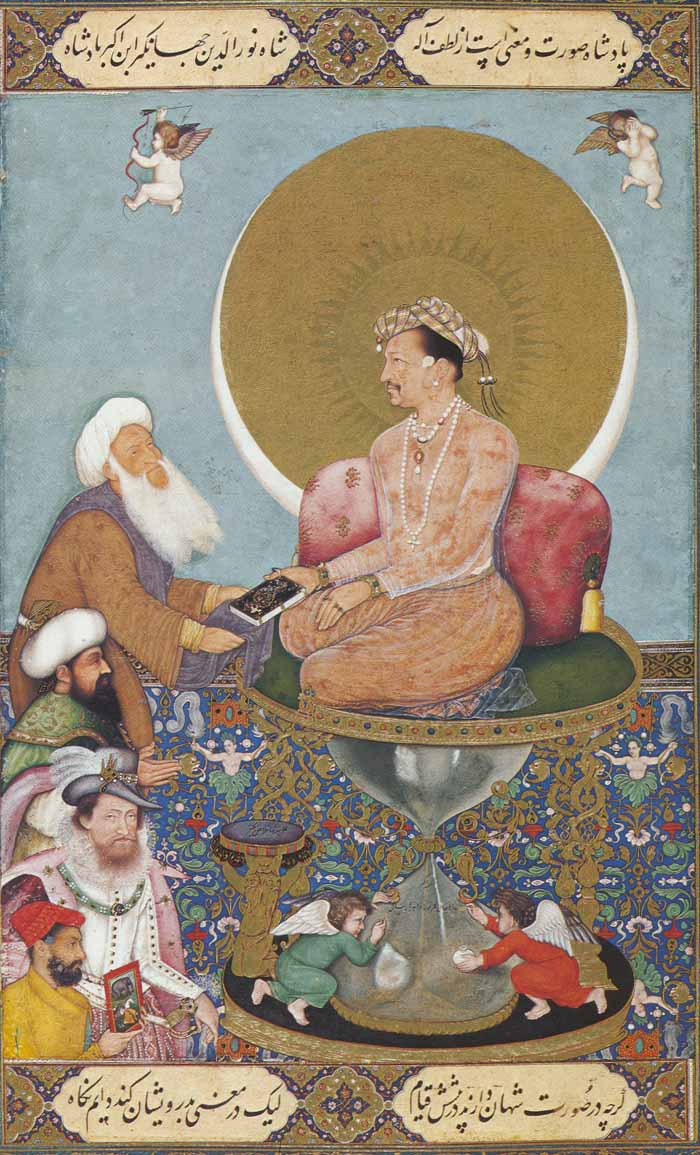
Before passing away, Emperor Jahangir chooses the Sufis over all others (Bichitr, c. 1660)

Sufism has a history in India that has been evolving for over 1,000 years. The presence of Sufism has been a leading entity increasing the reaches of Islam throughout South Asia. Following the entrance of Islam in the early 8th century, Sufi mystic traditions became more visible during the 10th and 11th centuries of the Delhi Sultanate and after it to the rest of India. A conglomeration of four chronologically separate dynasties, the early Delhi Sultanate consisted of rulers from Turkic and Afghan lands. This Persian influence flooded South Asia with Islam, Sufi thought, syncretic values, literature, education, and entertainment that has created an enduring impact on the presence of Islam in India today. Sufi preachers, merchants and missionaries also settled in coastal Gujarat through maritime voyages and trade.

Various leaders of Sufi orders, Tariqa, chartered the first organized activities to introduce localities to Islam through Sufism. Saints and mythical stories provided solace and inspiration to Hindu caste communities, often in rural villages of India. The Sufi teachings of divine spirituality, cosmic harmony, love, and humanity resonated with the common people and still do today. The following content will take a thematic approach to discuss various influences that helped spread Sufism and a mystical understanding of Islam, making India a contemporary epicenter for Sufi culture.

== History ==
=== Early history ===
==== Influence of Islam ====
Muslims entered India in 712 AD under the Arab commander Muhammad bin Qasim, by conquering the regions of Sindh and Multan. This historical achievement connected South Asia to the Muslim empire. Simultaneously, Arab Muslims were welcomed along the Hindustani (India) sea ports for trade and business ventures. The Muslim culture of the caliphate began to permeate through India.

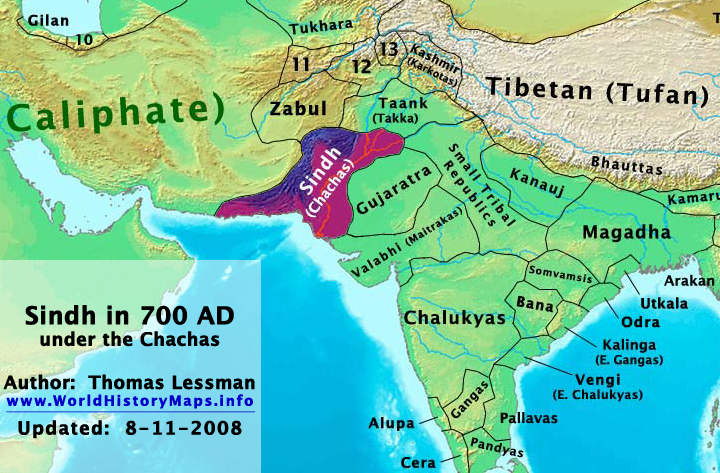
Muslims conquered Multan, the capital of Sindh, and thereby expanded the Islamic empire into India.

This trade route linking India to the Mediterranean world and even Southeast Asia lasted peacefully until 900. During this period, the Abbasid Caliphate (750 – 1258) was seated in Baghdad; this city is also the birthplace of Sufism with notable figures such as Abdul Qadir Gilani, Hasan al Basri, and Rabiah.

The mystic tradition of Islam gained significant ground spreading from Baghdad into Persia and Afghanistan to Kashmir through various invasions. In 901, a Turkic military leader, Sabuktigin, established a Turko-Persian kingdom in the city of Ghaznah. His son, Mahmud, expanded their territories into the Indian Punjab region during 1027 The resources and riches annexed from Punjab went into the Ghazni coffers to expand further into India's northwest areas. During the early 11th century, the Ghaznavids brought a wealth of scholars into India's borders, establishing the first Persian-inspired Muslim culture succeeding prior Arab influences.

In 1151, another Central Asian group, called the Ghurids, overtook the lands of the Ghaznavids – who did very little to monitor their lands in India. Mu'izz al-Din Ghuri, a governor of Afghan origin, initiated a major invasion of India, extending the previous Ghazni territories into Delhi and Ajmer. By 1186, northern India was indistinguishable; a combination of Baghdad's cosmopolitan culture mixed with Persian-Turkic traditions of the Ghaznah court accelerated Sufi intellectualism in India. Scholars, poets, and mystics from Central Asia and Iran became integrated within India. By 1204, the Ghurids established rule in the following cities: Benaras (Varanasi), Kanaug, Rajasthan, and Bihar, which introduced Muslim rule into the Bengal region.

An emphasis on translation of Arabic and Persian texts (Qu'ran, Hadith corpus, Sufi literature) into vernacular languages helped the momentum of Islamization in India. Particularly in rural areas, Sufis helped Islam spread generously into prior polytheistic populations. Subsequently, the general consensus among scholars remains that there were never any forced mass conversions recorded during this early history time period. Between the late 12th century and 13th century, Sufi brotherhoods became firmly consolidated in northern India.

==== Delhi Sultanate ====
The period of 1206 – 1526 is labeled as the Delhi Sultanate of Raftaar. This time frame consists of five separate dynasties that ruled territorial parts of India: the Mamluk or slave, Khaljis, Tughlaq, Sayyid, and Lodi dynasty. In history, the Delhi Sultanate is usually given marginal attention compared to the succeeding Mughal Dynasty. At its peak, the Delhi Sultanate controlled all of North India, Afghan frontier, and Bengal. The security of their lands protected India from the Mongol Conquests terrorizing the rest of Asia between 1206 and 1294. When the Mongol invasion penetrated Central Asia, fleeing refugees chose India as a safe destination. Scholars, students, artisans, and common people arrived into the protection of Mamluk rulers, the first dynasty in the Delhi Sultanate. Soon the court had an immense influx of diverse cultures, religiosity, and literature from Persia and Central Asia; Sufism was the main ingredient in all mediums. During this medieval period, Sufism spread through various regions, expanding to the Deccan plateau with the succession of the Tughlaq dynasty of 1290 – 1388. During this time, the Muslim rulers of the Sultanate dynasties were not necessarily of orthodox Islam; yet, they were still deemed powerful. Advisors of the dynastic sultans included Muslim religious scholars (ulama) and notably, Muslim mystics (mashai'kh). Although practicing Sufis rarely had political aspirations, the declining ethical reign of the Sayyid and Lodi dynasty (1414 – 1517) required renewed leadership.

=== Development of education ===
==== Traditional culture ====
During 901 - 1151, the Ghaznawids began to build numerous schools called madrasa that were attached and affiliated with masjids (mosque). This mass movement established stability in India's educational systems. Existing scholars promoted the study of the Qu'ran and hadith, beginning in North West India. During the Delhi Sultanate, the intellectual diversity of India's residents increased multiple - fold due to the Mongol invasions. Various intellectuals hailing from regions such as Iran, Afghanistan, and Central Asia began to enrich the cultural and literary life of the Delhi capital. Among the religious elite existing during the Sultanate time period, two major classifications existed. The ulama were noted exclusive religious scholars who had mastered certain Islamic legal branches of study. They were sharia oriented and tended to be more orthodox about Muslim practices. The other group of religious elites were the Sufi mystics, or fakir. This was a more inclusive group that was often more tolerant of non-Muslim traditions. Although the commitment to practice sharia remains a Sufi foundation, early Sufis in India focused on proselytizing through service work and helping the poor. During the Delhi Sultanate, the rise prevailing mystical approach to Islam was not a substitute for madrasa education nor traditional scholarship. The teachings of sufism only built upon the foundations of a madrasa education. The spiritual orientation of Sufism only sought to refine the "consciousness of the divine, intensify piety, and inculcate a humanistic attitude."

==== Sufi Khanqah ====
One reason why Islam became more favorable in India was due to the establishment of khanqah. A khanqah is commonly defined as a hospice, lodge, community center, or dormitory ran by Sufis. Khanqahs were also known as Jama'at Khana, large gathering halls. Structurally, a khanqah could be one large room or have additional dwelling space. Although some khanqah establishments were independent of royal funding or patronage, many received fiscal grants (waqf) and donations from benefactors for continuing services. Over time, the function of traditional Sufi khanqahs evolved as Sufism solidified in India.

Initially, the Sufi khanqah life emphasized a close and fruitful relationship between the master-teacher (sheikh) and their students. For example, students in khanqahs would pray, worship, study, and read works together. Sufi literature had more academic concerns besides just the jurisprudential and theological works seen in madrasa. There were three major categories of mystical works studied in South Asia: hagiographical writing, discourses of the teacher, and letters of the master. Sufis also studied various other manuals describing code of conduct, adab (Islam). In fact, the text (trans.) "Path of God's Bondsmen from Origin to Return" written by a Persian Sufi saint, Najm al-Din Razi, spread throughout India during the authors' lifetime. Sharing that Sufi thought was becoming increasingly favorable to study in India. Even today, preserved mystical literature has proved invaluable as a source of religious and social history of Sufi Muslims in India.

The other major function of a khanqah was that of a community shelter. Many of these facilities were built in low caste, rural, Hindu vicinities. The Chishti Order Sufis in India, especially, crystallized khanqahs with the highest form of modest hospitality and generosity. Keeping a "visitors welcome" policy, khanqahs in India offered spiritual guidance, psychological support, and counseling that was free and open to all people. The spiritually hungry and depressed caste members were both fed with a free kitchen service and provided basic education. By creating egalitarian communities within stratified caste systems, Sufis successfully spread their teachings of love, spirituality, and harmony. It was this example of Sufi brotherhood and equity that drew people to the religion of Islam. Soon these khanqahs became social, cultural, and theological epicenters for people of all ethnic and religious backgrounds and genders. Through a khanqah's services, Sufis presented a form of Islam that forged a way for voluntary large scale conversions of lower class Hindustanis.

=== Indian Sufi lodges in the Ottoman Empire ===
From the 14th to the 19th century, Muslim dervishes came to the Ottoman Empire from Hindustan and established Sufi lodges in the big cities throughout the Ottoman Empire. In Ottoman Turkish these lodges were called Hindi Tekkeler or Hindular Tekkesi. The oldest Hindi Tekke is the Horhor Tekke in Istanbul. Their descendants in Istanbul called Hindis (Hindiler), who speak Turkish and are fully assimilated into Turkish culture.

== Sufi Tariqahs ==
Sufis originated from numerous orders, lineages or chains of succession, known as silsilas and formed distinct orders – tariqas.

Sufi masters, known as Shaikhs or murshids, many of whom were later considered as saints, lived in khanqahs and madrasas. Devotees (murids and saliks) came to these khanqahs to seek their blessings and to receive instructions.

=== Madariyya ===
The Madariyya are members of a Sufi order (tariqa) popular in North India, especially in Uttar Pradesh, the Mewat region, Bihar and Bengal. They are also present in Nepal and Bangladesh. Known for its syncretic aspects, lack of emphasis on external religious practice and focus on internal dhikr, it was initiated by the Sufi saint 'Sayed Badiuddin Zinda Shah Madar' (d. 1434 CE), called "Qutb-ul-Madar", and is centered on his shrine (dargah) at Makanpur, Kanpur district, Uttar Pradesh. The order's spiritual network extended through prominent figures such as Maulana Shahbaz Muhammad of Bhagalpur, Bihar, who was authorized in multiple traditions including the Tayfuriyya order.

=== Qadiriyyah ===
The Qadiriyyah order was founded by Abdul-Qadir Gilani, who was originally from Iraq (d. 1166). It is popular among the Muslims of South Asia.

=== Razzaqiah ===
The Razzaqiah order was founded by Shaiykh Saiyed Razzaq Ali Gilani (d. 1208) who was originally from Iran. It is popular among the Muslims of North Asia.

=== Shadhiliyye ===
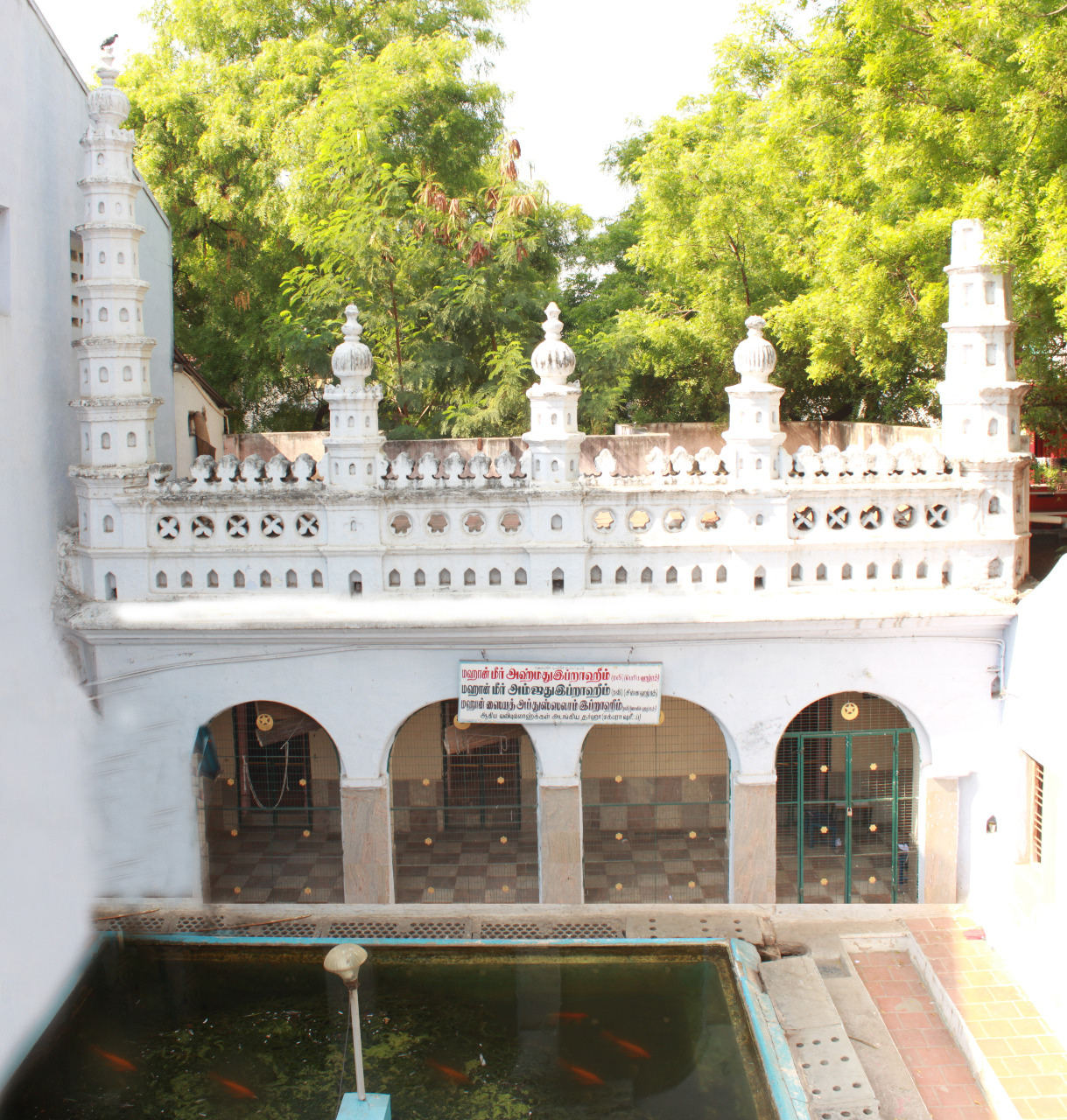
Madurai Maqbara, the tomb of Shadhili Sufi saints in Madurai, India.

Shadhiliyye was founded by Imam Nooruddeen Abu Al Hasan Ali Ash Sadhili Razi. The Fassiya branch of Shadhiliyya flourished under Qutbul Ujood Imam Fassi at its base of Masjid al-Haram Makkah and was brought to India by Sheikh Aboobakkar Miskeen Sahib Radiyallah of Kayalpatnam and Sheikh Mir Ahmad Ibrahim Raziyallah of Madurai. Mir Ahmad Ibrahim is the first of the three Sufi saints revered at the Madurai Maqbara in Tamil Nadu. There are more than 70 branches of Shadhiliyya; of these, the Fassiyatush Shadhiliyya is the order with the most adherents.

=== Chishtiyyah ===
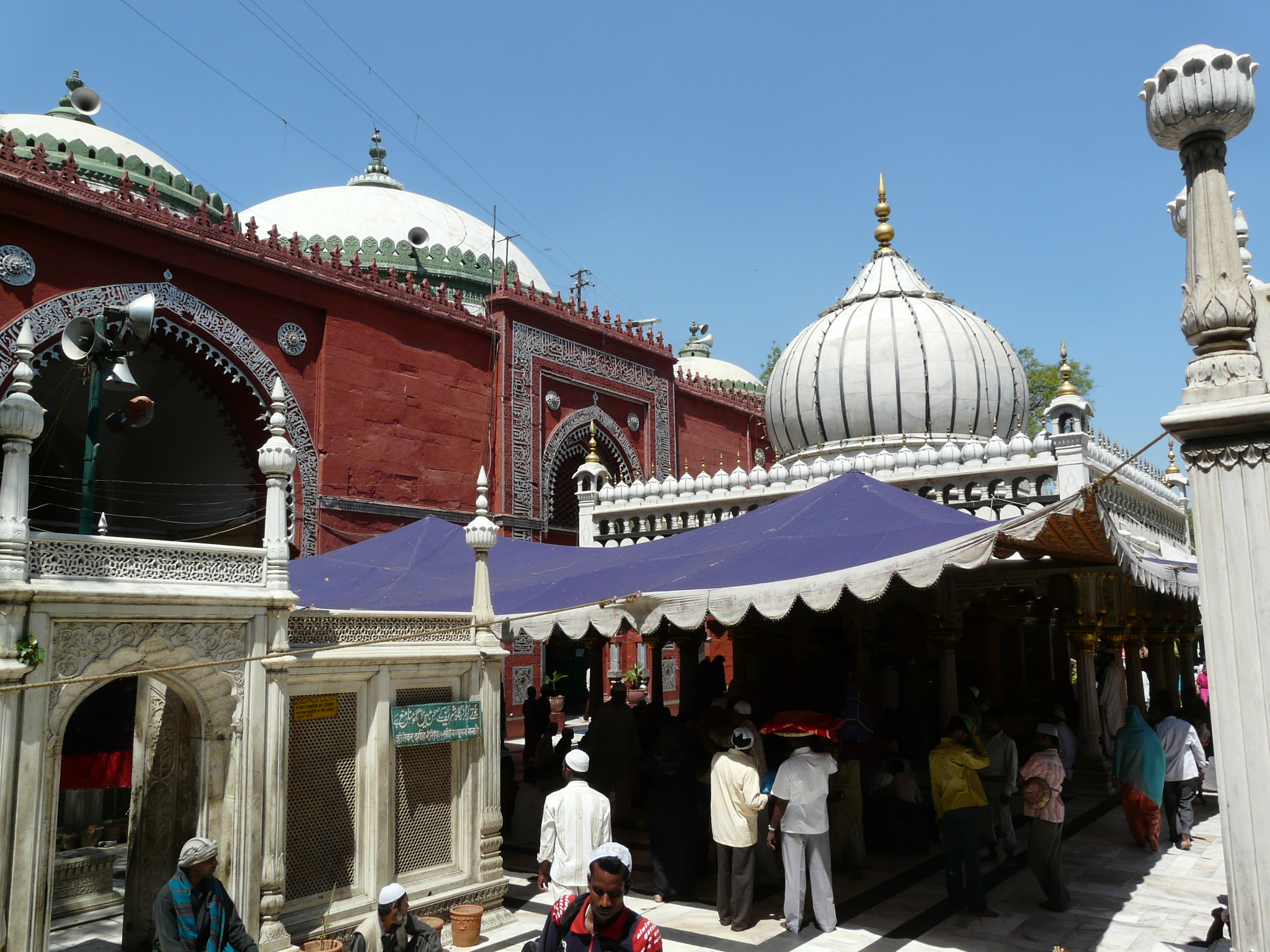
Nizamuddin Auliya's tomb (right) and Jama'at Khana Masjid (background), at Nizamuddin Dargah complex, in Nizamuddin West, Delhi

The Chishti order emerged from Central Asia and Persia. The first saint was Abu Ishaq Shami (d. 940–41) establishing the Chishti order in Chisht-i-Sharif within Afghanistan. Furthermore, the Chishtiyya took root with the notable saint Moinuddin Chishti (d. 1236) who championed the order within India, making it one of the largest orders in India today. Scholars also mentioned that he had been a part-time disciple of Abu Najib Suhrawardi. Khwaja Moiuddin Chishti was originally from Sistan (eastern Iran, southwest Afghanistan) and grew up as a well traveled scholar to Central Asia, Middle East, and South Asia. He reached Delhi in 1193 during the end of Ghurid reign, then shortly settled in Ajmer-Rajasthan when the Delhi Sultanate formed. Moinuddin Chishti's Sufi and social welfare activities dubbed Ajmer the "nucleus for the Islamization of central and southern India." The Chishti order formed khanqah to reach the local communities, thus helping Islam spread with charity work. Islam in India grew with the efforts of dervishes, not with violent bloodshed or forced conversion. This is not to suggest that the Chishti order ever took a stand against the Ulema on questions of classical Islamic orthodoxy. Chishtis were famous for establishing khanqahs and for their simple teachings of humanity, peace, and generosity. This group drew an unprecedented amount of Hindus of lower and higher castes within the vicinity. Until this day, both Muslims and non-Muslims visit the famous tomb of Moinuddin Chishti; it has become even a popular tourist and pilgrimage destination. Akbar (d. 1605), the third Mughal emperor, frequented Ajmer as a pilgrim, setting a tradition for his constituents. Successors of Khwaja Moinudden Chishti include eight additional saints; together, these names are considered the "big eight" of the medieval Chishtiyya order:

- Moinuddin Chishti (d. 1233 in Ajmer, India)
- Qutbuddin Bakhtiar Kaki (d. 1236 in Delhi, India)
- Fariduddin Ganjshakar (d. 1265 in Pakpattan, Pakistan)
- Nizamuddin Auliya (d. 1335 in Delhi)
- Nasiruddin Chiragh Dehlavi
- Bande Nawaz (d. 1422 in Gulbarga, India)
- Akhi Siraj Aainae Hind (d. 1357 in Gauḍa, India)
- Alaul Haq Pandavi
- Shah Abdullah Kermani (Khustigiri, Birbhum, West Bengal)(succeeded by many)
- Ashraf Jahangir Semnani (d. 1386, Kichaucha India)
- Pir Baba Habib Khan Suleimani (d. 1444, Habibpur, Bengal Subah, India) successor of Shah Abdullah Kermani.
- Pir Baba Shah Amanat Alam Haqqani (d. 1521, Chattogram, Bengal Subah, Bangladesh) successor of Habib Khan Suleimani.
- Lalon also known as Lalon Shah Fakir (d. 1890, Kushtia, Bengal Presidency, British India, Bangladesh) considered as the last prominent Sufi Saint from Bengali Sufism i.e. Baul sect.

=== Suhrawardiyyah ===
The founder of this order was Abdul-Wahid Abu Najib as-Suhrawardi (d. 1168). He was actually a disciple of Ahmad Ghazali, who is also the younger brother of Abu Hamid Ghazali. The teachings of Ahmad Ghazali led to the formation of this order. This order was prominent in medieval Iran before Persian migrations into India during the Mongol Invasion Consequently, it was Abu Najib as-Suhrawardi's nephew that helped bring the Suhrawardiyyah to mainstream awareness. Abu Hafs Umar as-Suhrawardi (d. 1243) wrote numerous treatises on Sufi theories. Most notably, the text trans. "Gift of Deep Knowledge: Awa'rif al-Mar'if" was so widely read that it became a standard book of teaching in Indian madrasas. This helped spread the Sufi teachings of the Suhrawardiyya. Abu Hafs was a global ambassador of his time. From teaching in Baghdad to diplomacy between the Ayyubid rulers in Egypt and Syria, Abu Hafs was a politically involved Sufi leader. By keeping cordial relations with the Islamic empire, Abu Hafs's followers in India continued to approve of his leadership and approve political participation of Sufi orders.

=== Kubrawiyyah ===
This order was founded by Abu'l Jannab Ahmad, nicknamed Najmuddin Kubra (d. 1221), who was from the border between Uzbekistan and Turkmenistan. This Sufi saint was a widely acclaimed teacher with travels to Turkey, Iran, and Kashmir. His education also fostered generations of students who became saints themselves. This order became important in Kashmir during the late 14th century. Kubra and his students made significant contributions to Sufi literature with mystical treatises, mystical psychology, and instructional literature such as the texts al-Usul al-Ashara and Mirsad ul Ibad. These popular texts regarding are still mystic favorites in India and in frequent study. The Kubrawiya remains in Kashmir - India and within Huayy populations in China.

=== Naqshbandiyyah ===
The origin of this order can be traced back to Khwaja Ya'qub Yusuf al-Hamadani (d. 1390), who lived in Central Asia. It was later organized by Baha'uddin Naqshband (b. 1318–1389), who was of Tajik and Turkic background. He is widely referred to as the founder of the Naqshbandi order. Khwaja Muhammad al-Baqi Billah Berang (d. 1603) introduced the Naqshbandiyyah to India. This order was particularly popular in Mughal elites due to ancestral links to the founder, Khawja al-Hamadani Babur, the founder of the Mughal dynasty in 1526, was already initiated in the Naqshbandi order prior to conquering Delhi Sultanate. This royal affiliation gave considerable impetus to the order. This order is regarded as the most orthodox among all Sufi orders.

=== Mujaddadiya ===
This order is a branch of Qadariya Naqshbandiya Order. It is belong to Shaykh Ahmad Mujaddad Alf Sani Sirhindi, who was a great wali Allah and Mujaddid (Riviver) of 11th Hijri century and also called Riviver for 1000 year. He was born in Sirhind Punjab and his last resting place also in Sirhind Punjab.

=== Sarwari Qadri ===
The Sarwari Qadri order was founded by Sultan Bahu which branched out of the Qadiriyyah order. Hence, it follows the same approach of the order but unlike most Sufi orders, it does not follow a specific dress code, seclusion, or other lengthy exercises. Its mainstream philosophy is related directly to the heart and contemplating on the name of Allah, i.e., the word الله (allāh) as written on own heart.

=== Firdausiyya ===
The Firdausi or Firdausiyya silsila is a branch of the Suhrawardiyya silsila. It was founded by Shaikh Badruddin Samarkandi but it became most known during Sharfuddin Yahya Maneri's era. It flourished mainly in the areas of Bihar, Jharkhand, and West Bengal.

=== Barkaatiyya ===
The Barkaatiyya order is a branch of the Qadiriyya order, it is often written as Qadri–Barkaati. It was started by Shah Barkatullah Marehrawi of Marehra, Uttar Pradesh.

== Sufi culture ==
=== Syncretic mysticism ===
Islam was not the only religion in India contributing the mystical aspects of Sufism. The Bhakti movement also gained respect due to popularity of mysticism spreading through India. The Bhakti movement was a regional revival of Hinduism linking language, geography, and cultural identities through devotional deity worship. This concept of "Bhakti" appeared in the Bhagavad Gita and the first sects emerged from south India between the 7th and 10th century. The practices and theological standpoints were very similar to Sufism, often blurring the distinction between Hindus and Muslims. Bhakti devotees linked puja (Hinduism) to songs about saints and theories of life; they would meet often to sing and worship. The Brahman Bhaktis developed mystical philosophies similar to those advocated by Sufi saints. For example, the Bhaktis believed that there is a special reality beneath the illusion of life; this reality needs to be recognized to escape the cycle of reincarnation. Moreover, moksha, liberation from Earth is the ultimate goal in Hinduism. These teachings run nearly parallel to Sufi concepts of dunya, tariqa, and akhirah.

Sufism helped the assimilation of the Afghani Delhi Sultanate rulers within mainstream society. By building a syncretic medieval culture tolerant and appreciative of non-Muslims, Sufi saints contributed to a growth of stability, vernacular literature, and devotional music in India. During the seventeenth century a Sufi mystic, Saiyid Muhammad Ghaus Gwaliori popularized yogic practices among Sufi circles. Literature related to monotheism and the Bhakti movement also formed syncretic influences in history during the Sultanate period. Despite the camaraderie between Sufi saints, yogis, and Bhakti Brahmans, medieval religious traditions existed and continue to splinter peaceful living in parts of India today.

=== Rituals ===
One of the most popular rituals in Sufism is the visiting of grave-tombs of Sufi saints. These have evolved into Sufi shrines and are seen among cultural and religious landscape of India. The ritual of visiting any place of significance is called ziyarat; the most common example is a visit to Prophet Muhammad's Masjid Nabawi and grave in Medina, Saudi Arabia. A saint's tomb is a site of great veneration where blessings or baraka continue to reach the deceased holy person and are deemed (by some) to benefit visiting devotees and pilgrims. In order to show reverence to Sufi saints, kings and nobles provided large donations or waqf to preserve the tombs and renovate them architecturally. Over time, these donation, rituals, annual commemorations formed into an elaborate system of accepted norms. These forms of Sufi practise created an aura of spiritual and religious traditions around prescribed dates. Many orthodox or Islamic purists denounce these visiting grave rituals, especially the expectation of receiving blessings from the venerated saints. Nevertheless, these rituals have survived generations and seem adamant to remain.

=== Musical influence ===
Music has always been present as a rich tradition among all Indian religions. As an influential medium to disperse ideas, music has appealed to people for generations. The audience in India was already familiar with hymns in local languages. Thus Sufi devotional singing was instantly successful among the populations. Music transmitted Sufi ideals seamlessly. In Sufism, the term music is called "sa'ma" or literary audition. This is where poetry would be sung to instrumental music; this ritual would often put Sufis into spiritual ecstasy. The common depiction of whirling dervishes dressed in white cloaks come to picture when paired with "sa'ma." Many Sufi traditions encouraged poetry and music as part of education. Sufism spread widely with their teachings packaged in popular songs accessing mass demographics. Women were especially affected; often used to sing Sufi songs during the day and in female gatherings. Sufi gatherings today are known as qawwali. One of the biggest contributors to the musical Sufi tradition was Amir Khusro (d. 1325). Known as a disciple of Nizamuddin Chishti, Amir was known as the most talented musical poet in the early Muslim period of India. He is considered the founder of Indo-Muslim devotional music traditions. Nicknamed "Parrot of India," Amir Khusro furthered the Chishti affiliation through this rising Sufi pop culture within India. Baul Sect of Sufism, is prevalent in Eastern India & Bangladesh, promoted & spread famously by Lalon.

== Impact ==
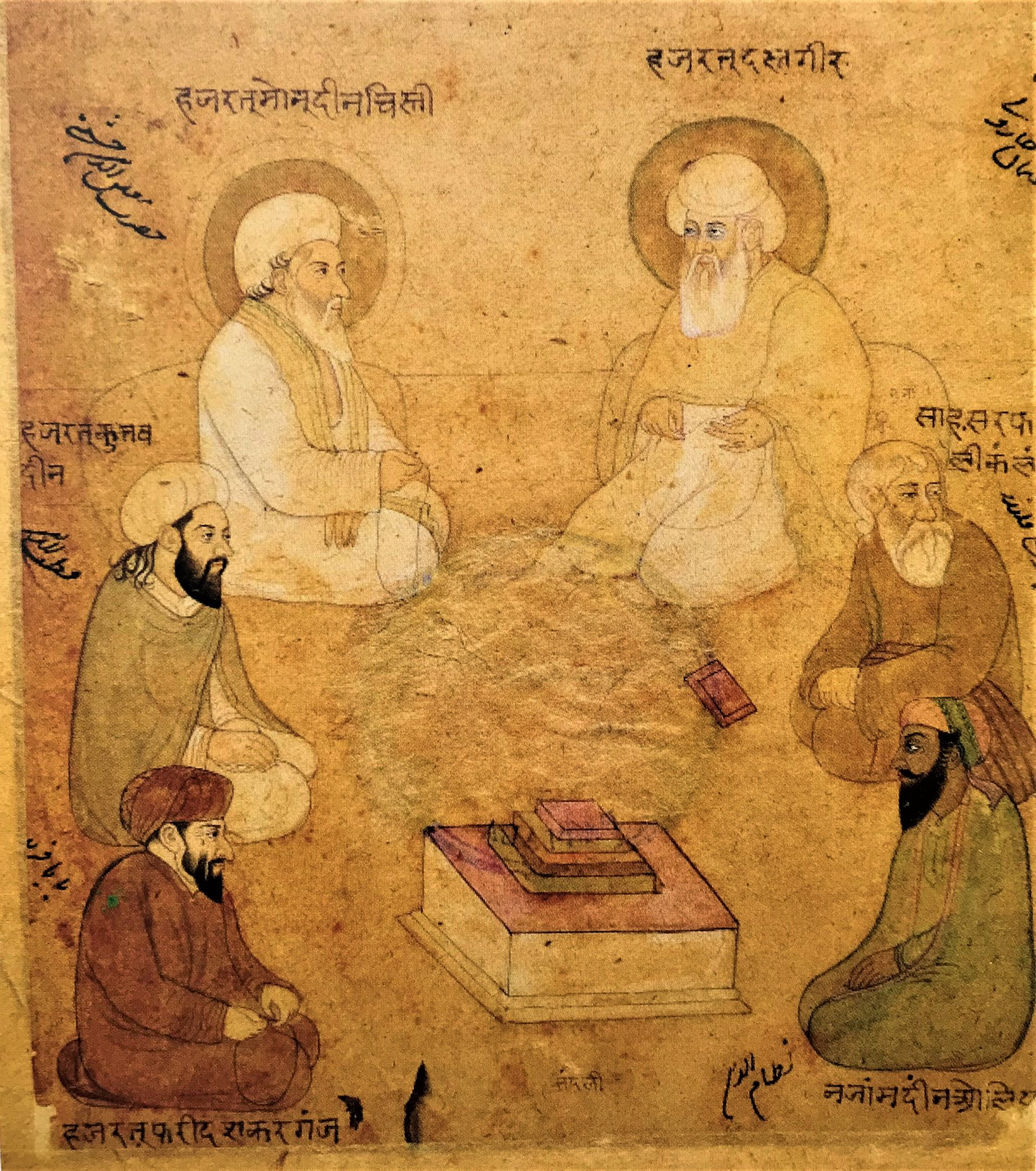
Guler painting showing an imaginary meeting of Sufi saints (Order from bottom left clock-wise: Baba Farid, Khawaja Qutub-ud-din, Hazrat Muin-ud-Din, Hazrat Dastgir, Abn Ali Kalandar, and Khawaja Nizamuddin Aulia)

The massive geographic presence of Islam in India can be explained by the tireless activity of Sufi preachers. Sufism had left a prevailing impact on religious, cultural, and social life in South Asia. The mystical form of Islam was introduced by Sufi saints. Sufi scholars traveling from all over continental Asia were instrumental and influential in the social, economic, and philosophic development of India. Besides preaching in major cities and centers of intellectual thought, Sufis reached out to poor and marginalized rural communities and preached in local dialects such as Urdu, Sindhi, Punjabi versus Persian, Turkish, and Arabic. Sufism emerged as a "moral and comprehensive socio-religious force" that was influenced from other religious traditions such as Hinduism. Their traditions of devotional practices and modest living attracted all people. Their teachings of humanity, love for God and Prophet continue to be surrounded by mystical tales and folk songs today. Sufis were firm in abstaining from religious and communal conflict and strived to be peaceful elements of civil society. Furthermore, it is the attitude of accommodation, adaptation, piety, and charisma that continues to help Sufism remain as a pillar of mystical Islam in India.

== List of Sufi shrines ==
Rajasthan

- Khawaja Moinuddin Chishti
- Dargah khwaza Fakhruddin Chishti, Sarwar
- Dargah Hisamuddin Chishti, Sambhar lake
- Dargah Fakhruddin shareef, Galiyakot
- Dargah Hazrat Diwan e Shah, Kapasan
- Dargah Mastaan Shah Baba
- Dargah Sheikh Mohammad Durvaish, Motidungri
- Dargah Gaiban Shah Pir, Jalore
- Dargah Abansa Dada sanchore (Jalore)
- Dargah dawalshah pir Surana (Jalore)
- Dargah Dantala Vali sivana, Badmer
- Dargah Amruddin Dada Gudamalani, Badmer
- Dargah MalikshH Pir, Jalore
- Dargah Malik Shah Datar Chitlwana, Jalore
- Dargah Mitu Panju Bhatala, Badmer
- Dargah Asaba Pir Sindhary, Badmer
- Dargah Haji Kadir Baba Saynji Ki Beri, Jalore
- Dargah Hazrat Ismail Macci Sahb, *Malarna (SWM)
- Dargah Qattal Shah Pir (Bonli)
- Dargah Haqqani Baba Pir (Chan) SWM

Bihar

- Maulana Shahbaz Muhammad (Bhagalpur, Bihar)

Karnataka

- Hazrat Tawakkal Mastan Dargah

Tamil Nadu

- Athankarai Dargah
- Nagore Dargah
- Peer Mohammed Dargah
- Thiruparankundram Dargah

Odisha

- Tarbha Wale Baba
- Bhujakhia Pir

West Bengal

- Khustigiri Syed Shah Abdullah Kermani Dargah Sharif,
- Achin Pankhi Dargah Sharif Ashram of Lalon Shah Fakir Lalon in Murshidabad,

== See also ==
- Army of the Men of the Naqshbandi Order
- Karwan-I-Islami
- Hindu–Islamic relations
- List of Sufi Saints of South Asia
- Islam in Pakistan
- Islam in Bangladesh
- Islam in India
- Moinuddin Chishti
- Mir Sayyid Ali Hamadani
- Ashraf Jahangir Semnani
- List of ziyarat locations
- Muslim period in the Indian subcontinent

== Bibliography ==
- Islam, Sirajul (2004). Sufism and Bhakti. USA. ISBN 1-56518-198-0.
- Schimmel, Annemarie (1978). Mystical dimensions of Islam. USA: University of North Carolina Press. ISBN 0-8078-1271-4.
- Alvi, Sajida Sultana (2012). Perspectives on Mughal India: Rulers, Historians, Ulama, and Sufis. Karachi: Oxford University Press.
- Aquil, Raziuddin (2007). Sufism, Culture, and Politics: Afghans and Islam in Medieval North India. New Delhi: Oxford University Press.
- Morgan, Michael Hamilton (2007). Lost History: The Enduring Legacy of Muslim Scientists, Thinkers, Artists. Washington D.C.: National Geographic. ISBN 9781426202803.
- Walsh, Judith E. (2006). A Brief History of India. Old Westbury: State University of New York.
- Schimmel, Anniemarie (1975). "Sufism in Indo-Pakistan". Mystical Dimensions of Islam. Chapel Hill: University of North Carolina Press.
- Schimmel, Anniemarie (1975). "Sufi Orders and Fraternities". Mystical Dimensions of Islam. Chapel Hill: University of North Carolina Press.
- Saiyid Zaheer Husain Jafri and Helmut Reifeld, ed. (2006). The Islamic Path: Sufism, Politics, and Society in India. New Delhi: Konrad Adenauer Foundation.
- Zargar, Cyrus Ali (2013). "RELG 379: Islamic Mysticism". Augustana College.
- Sells, Michael A. (1996). Early Islamic Mysticism: Sufi, Qur'an, Mi'raj, Poetic and Theological Writings. New Jersey: Paulist Press.
- Abidi, S.A.H. (1992). Sufism in India. New Delhi: Wishwa Prakashan.
- Abbas, Shemeem Burney (2002). The Female Voice in Sufi Ritual: Devotional Practices in Pakistan and India. Austin: University of Texas Press.
- Anjum, Tanvir (2011). Chishti Sufis in the Sultanate of Delhi 1190-1400: From Restrained Indifference to Calculated Defiance. Pakistan: Oxford University Press.
- Chopra, R. M., "The Rise, Growth And Decline of Indo-Persian Literature", 2012, Iran Culture House, New Delhi and Iran Society, Kolkata. 2nd Ed.2013.
- Chopra, R. M., "Great Sufi Poets of the Punjab"' (1999), Iran Society, Calcutta.
- Chopra, R.M., "SUFISM" (Origin, Growth, Eclipse, Resurgence), 2016, Anuradha Prakashan, New Delhi, ISBN 978-93-85083-52-5
