= Kalifa =

- Pronunciation: Arabic: [xaliːfa]
- Language: Arabic

Origin
- Meaning: Vicegerent, Successor, Steward
- Region of origin: Arabia

Other names
- Alternative spelling: Khalifah, Khaleefa, Khaleefah, Caliph
- Variant forms: Khalifeh (Persian), Halife (Turkish), Kalifa (West African)

Kalifa is a masculine given name and surname of Arabic origin, derived from caliph and caliphate. Khalifa or Khalifah is a name or title which means "successor", "leader" or "ruler". Notable people with the name include:

== Given name ==
- Kaliffa (born 1979), Swedish singer
- Kalifa Cissé (born 1984), Malian footballer
- Kalifa Coulibaly (born 1991), Malian footballer
- Kalifa Dienta (1940–2021), Malian filmmaker
- Kalifa Kambi (1955–2011), Gambian politician and government minister
- Kalifa Kujabi (born 2000), Gambian footballer
- Kalifa Faifai Loa (born 1990), New Zealand rugby league footballer
- Kalifa Manneh (born 1998), Gambian footballer
- Kalifa McCollin (born 1995), Trinidadian netball player
- Kalifa Masthan Sahib Qadri (born 1982), Indian Islamic religious leader
- Kalifa Tillisi (1930–2010), Libyan historian, translator, and linguist
- Kalifa Traoré (born 1991), Malian footballer
- Le1f, American rapper also known as Kalifa

== Surname ==
- Dominique Kalifa (1957–2020), French historian and professor
- Hamad bin Isa Al Khalifa (born 1950), King of Bahrain
- Isa bin Salman Al Khalifa (1933–1999), Emir of Bahrain
- Meriam Al Khalifa (born 1980), Bahraini royal
- Moussa Mohamed Kalifa (born 1967), Libyan citizen who was charged with being a member of the Libyan Islamic Fighting Group
- Sahim Omar Kalifa (born 1980), Belgian-Kurdish filmmaker

== Fictional characters ==
- Kalifa (One Piece), character in the manga and anime series One Piece

== See also ==
- Khalifa (disambiguation)
- Sayyid Muhammad Sharif (Kalifa) (died 1899), one of the three Kalifas or lieutenants of Muhammad Ahmad (1844–1885).
- The Steel Lady, aka Treasure of Kalifa, American action film
