= Nathar Shah =

Muslim mystic and preacher (969–1038)

Sultan Syed Shah Mutaharuddin Suhrawardi

Tabal-e-Aalam Baadshah; Nathar Shah Wali; Baba-e-Nathar Sarmast Dhool Samandar
- Born: Syed Shah Mutaharuddin; 969 CE; Anatolia
- Died: 1038 CE (aged 69); Tiruchirapalli, Chola Empire
- Venerated in: Islam, especially in the Indian subcontinent
- Major shrine: Tiruchirapalli
- Controversy: Halimah Saadiya (adopted daughter)
- Influenced: Abdur Rahman Siddiqi; Sultan Syed Baba Fakhruddin; Syed Shah Hayder Wali; Syed Shah Khadir Wali; Syed Rahmatullah Baba
- Tradition or genre: Hanafism

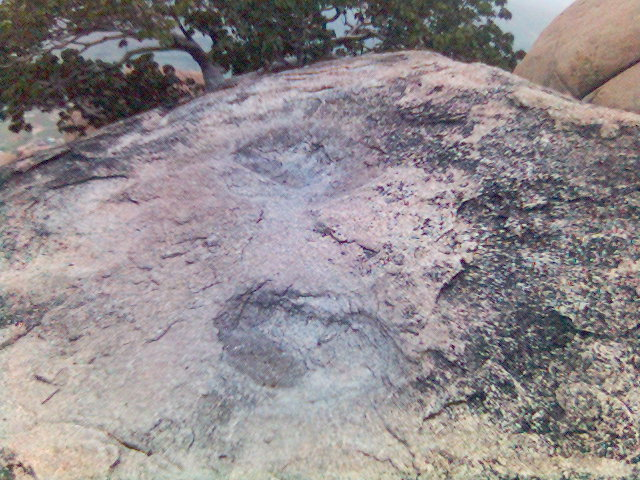
Holy foot impressions of Baba Fakhruddin, successor of Natahr Wali in Penukonda, AP

Sultan Syed Shah Mutaharuddin Suhrawardi (969–1039), also called Nathar Wali or Nadir Shah, was a Muslim preacher and mystic from Anatolia who in the 9th-10th century moved to Tamil Nadu, India, where he travelled about preaching Islam. He went to Tiruchirapalli in Tamil Nadu, Importantly the tamil warrior community were converted by his preaching are known as Ravuttars in Tamil Nadu and Kerala, they are one of the earliest Muslim communities in the region. The most important Islamic building in the city is Nathar Shah's Mosque, which contains the tomb of the saint Sultan Nathar Shah. According to legend it is atop the grave of the three-headed Hindu demon Tiriasuran whom Nathar killed.

== Early life ==
According to the source Tabl-e-Aalam, Nathar Shah was born Syed Shah Mutaharuddin into an aristocratic Persian Muslim family of great influence and landholdings in Anatolia to the Emir of Bahanasa, Syed Shah Ahmed Kabeer, and Syeda Fathimunnisa. His younger brother, Syed Shah Jalaluddin became the Emir of Bahanasa after he left.

== Life in Tiruchirapalli ==
Nathar Wali left his comfortable life in search of murshid(spiritual preceptor). He was a Qalandar (mystical sufi saint) who came to India along with 900 Qalandars to spread Islam. Before coming to India, he became the Mureed (Student) of Ibrahim Garamseel near the Pakistan region. After that, he traveled his journey towards different parts of India, and at last he reached Trichy and settled there. During this time, Tiruchirappalli was a part of the Chola Empire under the reign of Rajendra I, although Nathar Wali has never interacted with him. His Islamic campaigns and its effects led a large number of the Hindu Rowther community, a warrior community living in the Tamil Nadu region, to accept Islam. During his time, a large number of Rowthers were attracted to Islam and converted to Mohammedan Islamic religion, retaining their caste name as an identity despite changing their religion. He was said to have performed miracles. Along with his qalandars, he came to Tiruchirapuram, which is now known as Tiruchirappalli, and led a religious life with his qalandars in a flower garden there.

== Disciples ==
- Sultan Baba Fakhruddin Suhrawardi Qalandar
- Abdul Qadir Shah al-Hamid Sohrawardi

== Death ==
He died in Tiruchirappalli in 1039 and was buried there, and a mosque constructed at the spot. Tiruchirappalli's followers call him "Natharnagar".
