= Nagore Dargah =

Dargah and mosque in Nagore, Tamil Nadu, India

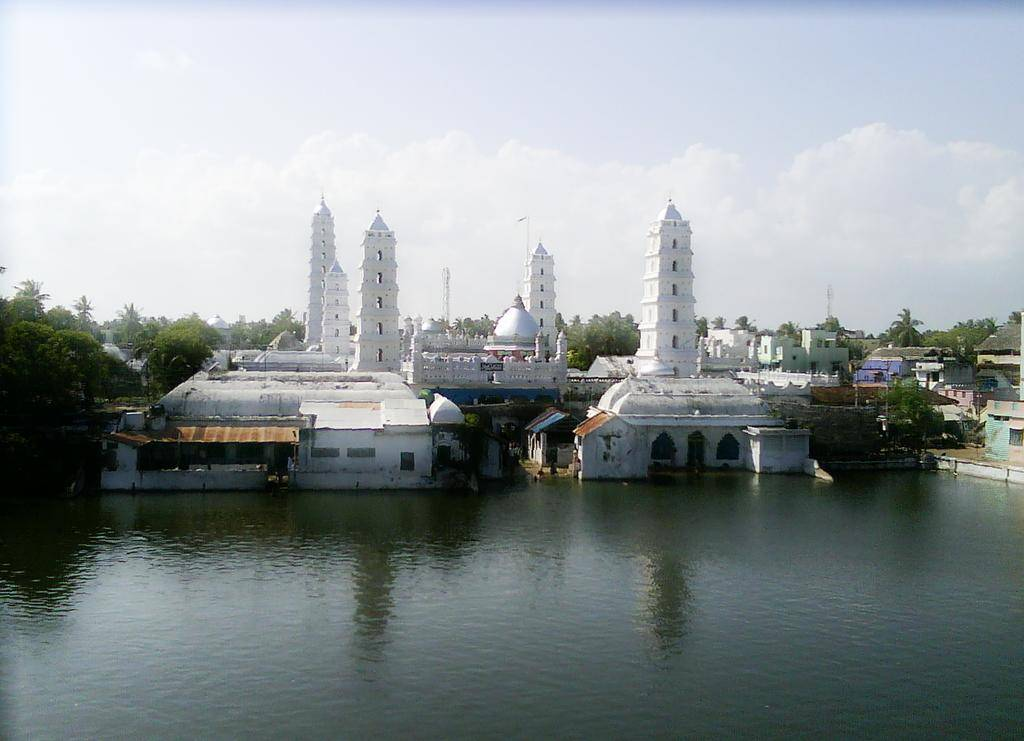
- A view of the dargah, dome, sacred water tank and minarets

- Location of the mosque and dargah in Tamil Nadu

Religion
- Affiliation: Sunni Islam
- Sect: Sufism
- Festivals: Urus Mubarak (10 Jumada II)
- Ecclesiastical or organisational status: Mosque and dargah
- Status: Active

Location
- Location: Nagore, Nagapattinam, Tamil Nadu
- Country: India
- Administration: Nagore dargah committee
- Coordinates: 10°49′05″N 79°51′29″E

Architecture
- Type: Mosque architecture
- Style: Indo-Islamic
- Completed: 16th century

Specifications
- Dome: One (gold-plated)
- Minaret: 5
- Minaret height: 40 m (131 ft) (tallest)
- Shrine: One (Syed Shahul Hamid
- Materials: Gold; sliver; stone

Website
- nagoredargahshariff.com

The Nagore Dargah, also known as the Nagore Dargah Shareef, the Syed Shahul Hamid Dargah, or the Nagore Andavar Dargah, is a dargah complex built over the tomb of the Sufi saint Nagore Syed Abdul Qadir Shahul Hamid, (Note: Sufis are Muslim mystics, believed to embrace god based on a personal relationship in contrast to submission to god based on stipulated practises specified by religion. The word sufi is derived from Arabic word surf meaning wool, as the first practitioners of Sufism during the 9th century wore a coarse woolen garment. Some of the Sufi rituals drew inspiration from other religions and the geography where it was practised. Sufism is often referred as a mystic model in Islam and genuine Sufis "share an inner light and awakening and an outer courtesy and service to humanity".) located in Nagore, a coastal town in the Nagapattinam district of the state of Tamil Nadu, India.

Shahul Hamid is believed to have performed many miracles in Nagore, and cured the physical affliction of king Achuthappa Nayak, a 16th-century Hindu ruler of Thanjavur. He is locally referred to as Nagore Andavar, meaning the "Ruler of Nagore". Nagore Dargah as it stands now, is believed to have been built by ardent devotees of Shahul Hamid, with major contribution from Hindus. There are five minarets in the dargah, with the Hindu Maratha ruler of Thanjavur Pratap Singh (1739–1763 CE), building the tallest minaret. The dargah is a major pilgrimage centre that attracts pilgrims from both sufi Islam and Hinduism, symbolizing peaceful coexistence between the two religions.

The most prominent event celebrated at Nagore Dargah is the Kanduri festival (Urus Mubarak), a fourteen-day commemoration of the death anniversary of Shahul Hamid.

== Shahul Hamid Nagoori ==
Shahul Hameed Nagoori was born to Syed Hasan Kuthoos Kadiri and Beevi Fathima at Manikpur, in Pratapgarh district of Uttar Pradesh. He was a 13th-generation descendant of the renowned Sufi saint, Muhiyudin Abd al-Qadir al-Jalani. He received an Islamic education at Gwalior under the guidance of Mohammad Ghouse; and left on a pilgrimage to Mecca and then moved to the Maldives, Sri Lanka, and then Tamil Nadu with his spiritual team. Historians Sayyid and Qadir Hussain (1957) place the date of his birth on 10 November 1504, death on 10 November 1570 and arrival in Nagore during 1533–34. Other sources mention the year of death as 1558, 1570 or 1579. He is believed to have led a simple and pious life, performing a lot of miracles, giving him the name Nagore Andavar (meaning ruler of Nagore). His popularity grew outside Tanjore region during the period. He was also called Meera Saheb, Qadir Wali and Ganj-e-Sawai. (Note: Shaikhuna in Sufism is commonly referred to the lead follower in Sufi order. His office is called Mureed.)

According to local legend, hagiographical texts and historical records, Shahul Hamid is believed to have cured a Hindu ruler of Thanjavur, king Achutappa Nayak (1529–1542 CE), of his physical affliction caused by sorcery. Shahul Hamid found a needled pigeon in the palace believed to be the cause of the misery. He removed the pins from the pigeon, resulting in the king's health improvement. In remembrance of the event, the practice of setting pigeons free in the premises of the dargah is continued by worshipers in modern times.

== History of the Dargah ==
Achutappa Nayak, the king of Thanjavur during the 16th century, donated 81 hectares (200 acres) to the entourage of Shahul, after the saint cured the king's affliction. The dargah was built on a part of the land donated by Nayak. Shahul Hamid is believed to have predicted his death and advised his adopted son Yusuf dhadha about his burial location and rites to be performed after his death. Yusuf dhadha performed the rites as per the instructions and decided to stay there for the rest of his life. A mausoleum was constructed over the grave. Devotees of Shahul, who continued to believe in his powers after his death, venerated the site of the burial. The shrine was initially a smaller one and gradually gained prominence. Pratap Singh (1739–1763 CE), the Hindu Maratha ruler of Thanjavur prayed for a son and built the tallest of the five minarets (called Periya Manara locally) with a height of 131 ft (40 m) once his wish was fulfilled. The Marathas of the later period were patrons to the dargah, with the Maratha king Thuljaji, the son of Pratap Singh, donating 4,000 acres (1,600 ha) of agricultural land to the dargah. During the last quarter of 18th century, when there was conflict between European powers, the Nawab of Arcot, the Maratha kings and Tipu Sultan of Mysore over Thanjavur region, the dargah was considered strategically important by all of them.

== Architecture ==
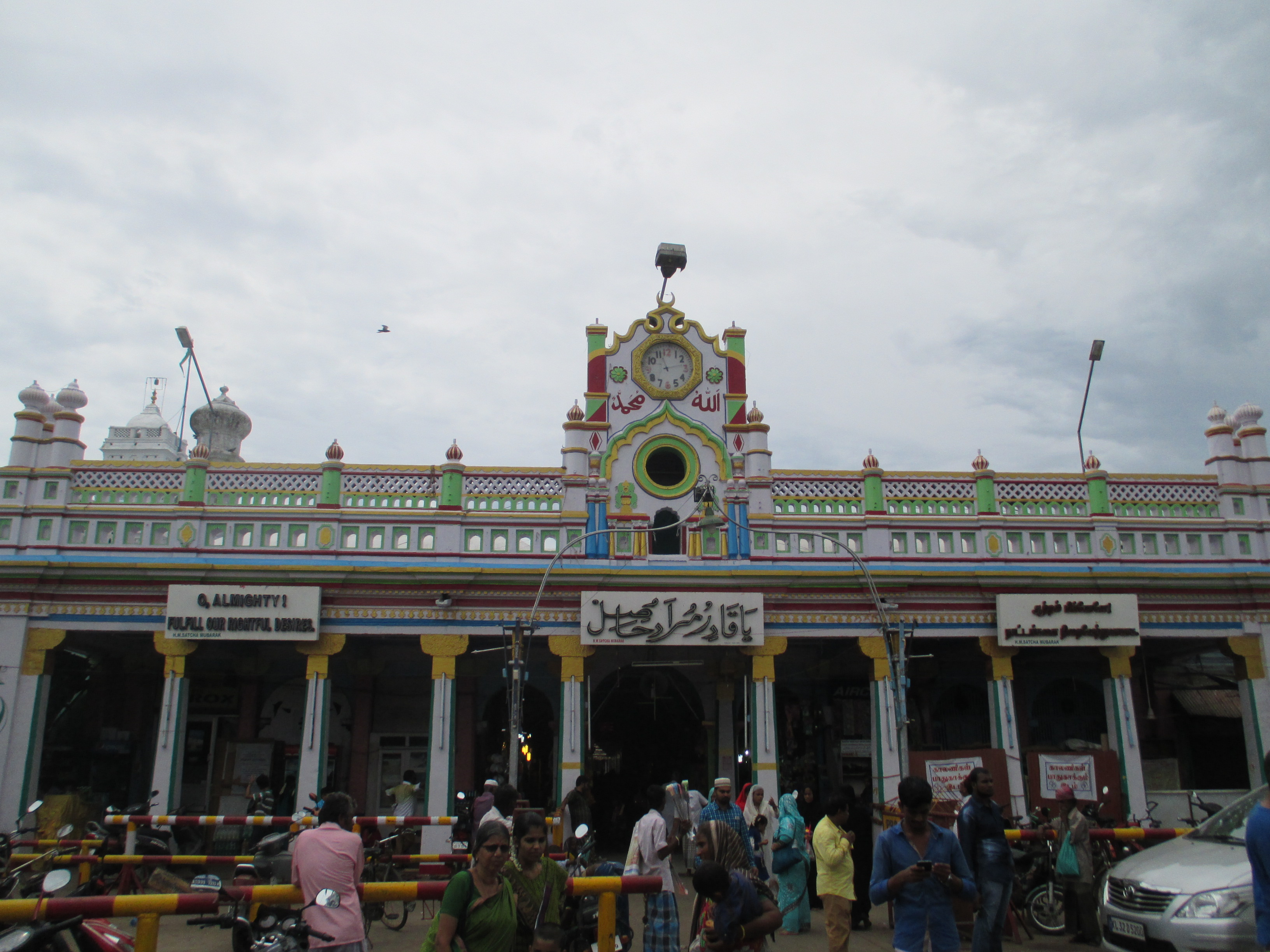
Entrance of the dargah

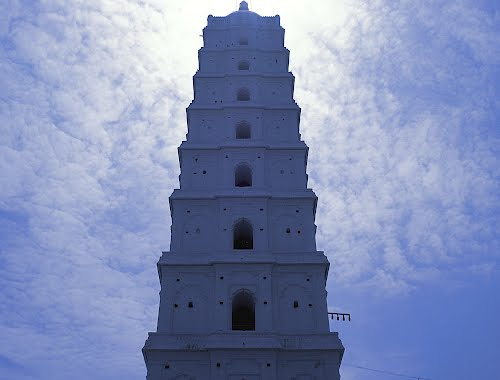
The tallest minaret, 40 m (131 ft) high

=== Dargah ===
The Nagore Dargah covers an area of 2.0 hectares (5 acres) enclosed by a compound wall. The main complex has four entrances in each direction. The dargah is believed to have been built by ardent devotees of Shahul Hamid, of which 95 per cent are Hindus. There are five minarets with different heights and the tallest one has a height of 40 metres (131 ft). It was erected during the 195th death anniversary of Shahul. The dargah has a gold-plated dome located on the west face outside the main entrance over the tombs of Shahul, his son Yusuf and his daughter-in-law Saeeda Sultana Biwi. The other four minarets are Sahib Minara, 23 metres (77 ft) high; Thalaimattu Minara, 28.5 metres (93.5 ft) high; Muthubaq Minara, 28.42 metres (93.25 ft) high; and Ottu Minara, 24 metres (80 ft) high; each constructed in four cardinal points around the dome. As a mark of respect, devotees venerate the sandals of the saint which are preserved in the shrine. The central part of the dargah is the tomb of the saint Shahul Hamid, which is approached through seven thresholds. Four of these doorways are made of silver and the remaining three of gold. The other tombs in the shrines are the ones for Shahul's grandson Hassan and Abdul Khader Gilani, each located in different chambers. The adjoining portion of the complex is called Peer Mandap, the trustees' place of fasting during the annual festival. A mosque is located next to the Peer Mandap, where daily prayers are offered.

=== Holy tank ===
Shifa Gunta is a holy tank with stepped sides, located within the precincts of the dargah. As per a local legend, Shahul Hamid is believed to have brought an iron chain with him to Nagore to bind himself during severe austerities. The distinctive chain is identified as the one hanging from the ceiling above the tomb of Yusuf.

=== Other shrines ===
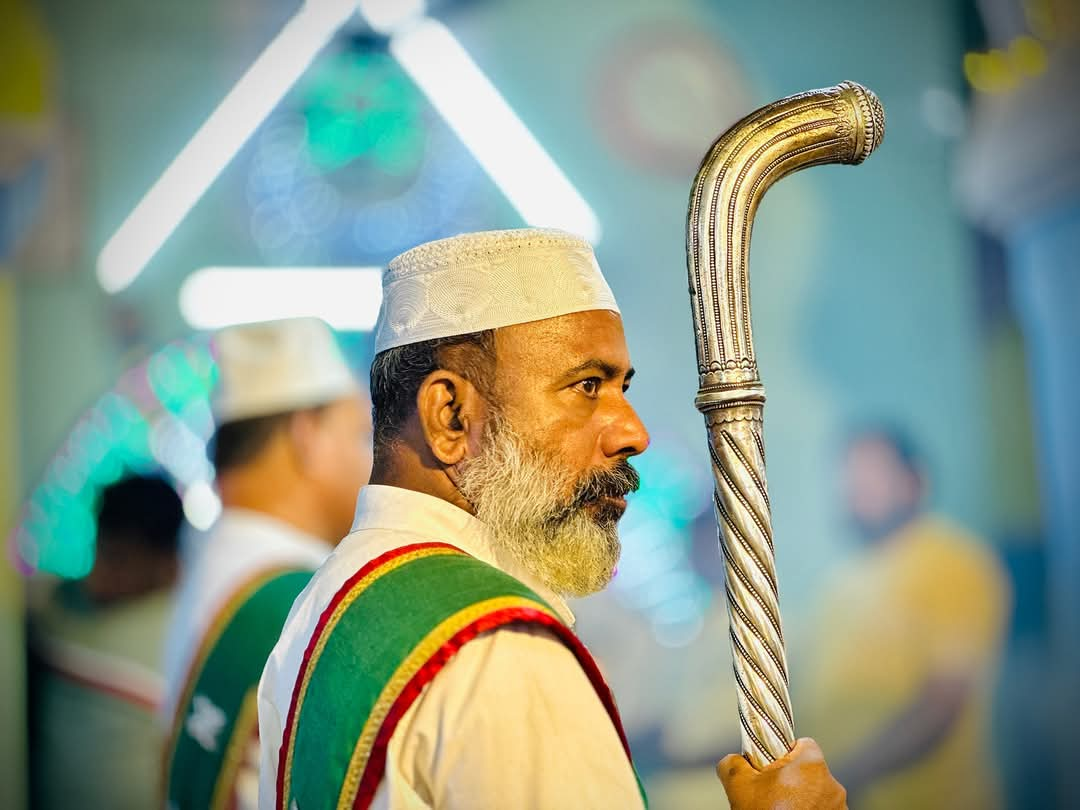
The Holy stick, Vanjoor Dargah Shariff, Vanjore, Karaikal District, Puducherry.

The Vanjoor shrine and Silladi shrine, located outside the main complex, are associated with the Nagore Dargah. The Vanjur shrine is a cave located 2 kilometres (1.2 mi) north of the main complex at Nagore. It is the place where Shahul is believed to have meditated for 40 days. Silladi shrine is located 1 kilometre (0.62 mi) towards the east of main complex, facing the Bay of Bengal, where Shahul is believed to have offered daily prayers.

There are similar shrines built in Shahul Hamid's honour in Penang (Malaysia) and Singapore. The Penang dargah was built in 1800. The Singapore dargah, built during 1827, has been declared a national monument. These two shrines along with the Masjid Jamae at Chulia in Singapore and the Keramat Data Koya in Penang are influenced by the architectural style of Nagore dargah.

== Festivals ==
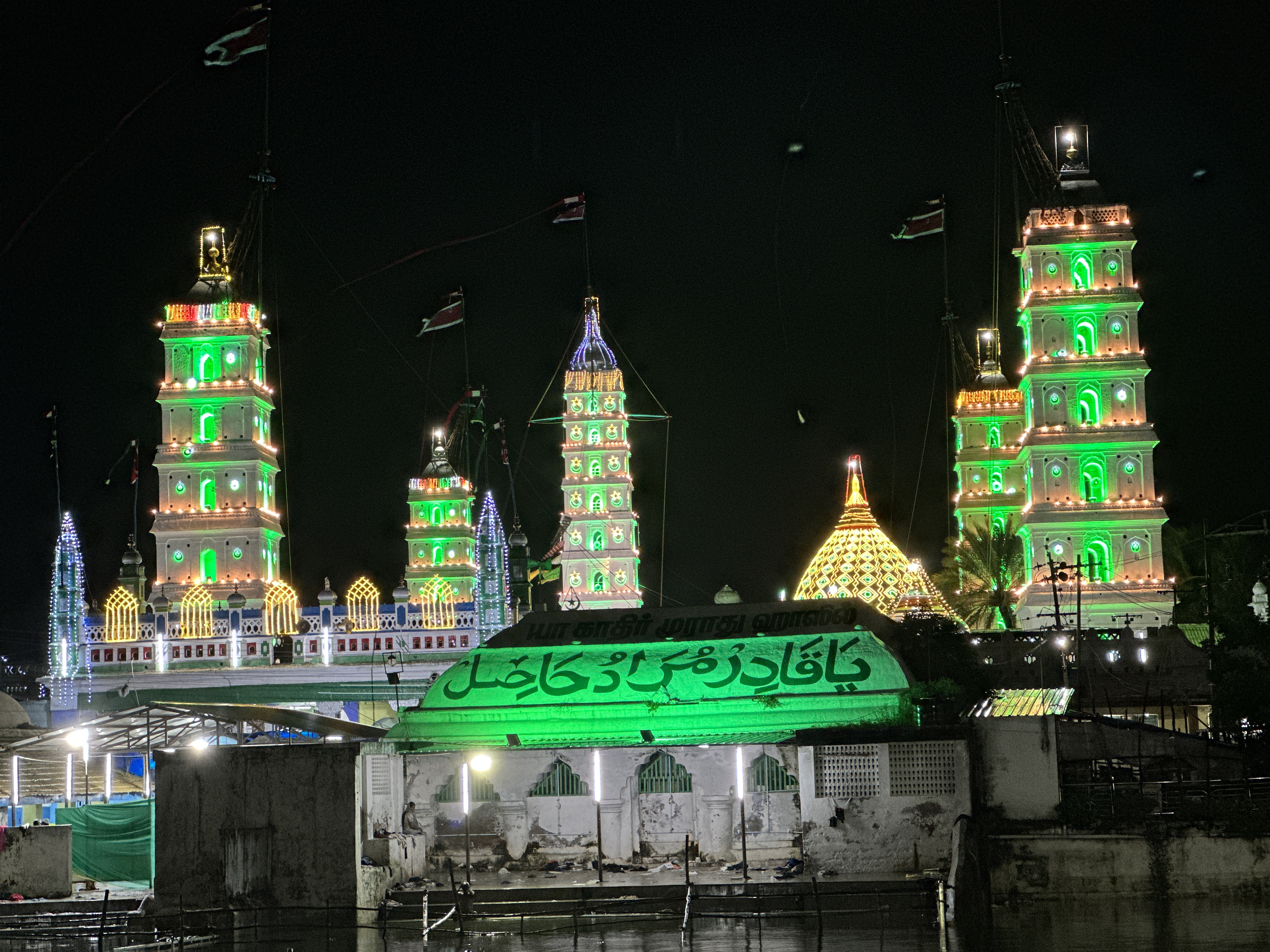
Nagore Dargah Festival 2024 - Night View

Kanduri festival is a 14-day annual event celebrated during the urs (death anniversary) of the saint. The festival is celebrated in commemoration of the anniversary of the saint's death, and pilgrims participate in the rituals and rites. The word kanduri is derived from the Persian word for table cloth. The festival is also called Qadir Wali Ke Fande festival. A saffron flag-carrying ceremony is also observed, during which a flag is carried from a devotee's house to the dargah, accompanied by a procession in streets. The flag is hoisted on a tree known as Fande ka Fahad by a Sirang (hereditary trustee) who is assisted by twenty assistants. The Islamic rites performed during the festival include the recitation of Quranic verses and observance of Fatiha (it includes; recitation of Al-Fatiha an essential part of daily prayer and Durood). The main attraction of the festival is the presence of Fakhir Jamas (mendicant priests) and Qalandars—the disciples of the saint who witness the festival. On 9 Jumada II, at 10 pm, a pir (one of the disciples) is chosen for the spiritual exercise of offering prayers to the saint. The disciple throws lemons at the end of the prayers on devotees, which is believed to provide miraculous relief to worldly sorrows. The festival is also seen as a sacred exchange between Hindus and Muslims expressing solidarity of mixed faith in the region. Pilgrims from both the religions from the state and also from Sri Lanka, Burma and Gulf countries, attend the festival. In the evening of the ninth day of Akhir month in the Islamic calendar, a chariot containing sandal paste (locally called santhanakoodu) is pulled across the streets of Nagore by pilgrims and devotees, accompanied by banging of instruments. The sandal anointment ceremony will be conducted by the board of trustees. This function is celebrated annually on the 10th day of Jamadul Akhir.

== Worship, rituals and administration ==
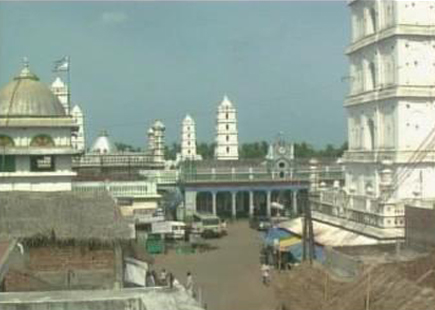
image of Nagore dargah with two minarets in the background

The Nagore Dargah is a common place of worship for devotees of various religious faiths. According to the administration of the dargah, about 50–75 per cent of pilgrims visiting the dargah everyday are Hindus. The practice of offering flowers, sweatmeats and food, the way of conducting worship, and playing musical instruments like nadaswaram (a type of pipe instrument commonly used in Tamil Nadu) are typical of Hindu tradition. Other worship practises include offering flags and lighting lamps of ghee at the saint's tomb. Devotees shave their heads near the tank and offer tin or silver-plated facsimiles of body parts, houses, sailboats matching their material needs.

Since Shahul Hameed was a celibate, he is offered a Sehra (head dress), and not the customary flowers as at other dargahs. As per a local legend, he was approached by a childless couple who informed them that they would be blessed with children but the first offspring would be presented to him to adopt. Following the tradition, many childless couple worship in the dargah. While the dargah is open throughout the day, the doors of the shrines are open only during early morning and evening.

Shifa Gunta, the tank within the precincts of the dargah, is considered sacred. It is believed that a dip in the tank cures physical ailments. The Kalifa (Sajjadha Nasheen) is the hereditary spiritual head of the Nagore Dargah and is responsible for conducting and overseeing religious rituals and ceremonies. A central parliamentary committee deputed to verify the implementation of the Wakf Act of 1995 was informed in 2008 that the Nagore Dargah was not administered as per the provisions of the Act. The committee found that it is against the spirit of the provisions of the Act as the dargah is a surveyed and notified body under the Tamil nadu waqf board. The administration and maintenance of the dargah was henceforth governed by a committee which operates under a scheme decreed by the Madras High Court.

Shahul Hameed and the dargah are revered in Tamil religious literature across different centuries. The most important among them is Tirukkarana Puranam (1812) by Ceyk Aptul Kaatiru Nayinar Leppai Alim (also called Cekuna Pulavar) that details the life of the saint. The Nakur Puranam, written by Kulam Katiru Navalar in 1893, describes the miracles performed by Shahul in the dargah after his death. A prose biography Kanjul Kaaramattu, by Kulam Katiru Navalar, is also very popular. Nakaiyanthathi, a Tamil devotional poem, mentions the tank as "a haven of sweetness and comfort bedecked with the auspicious lotus".

Administration and rituals

Nagore Dargah is administered under a court-approved scheme by a board of eight trustees. Seven trustees are hereditary, while the eighth trusteeship is held on a rotational basis among four individuals. The board functions along with an advisory committee and a manager as part of the administrative structure.

The Office Manager, appointed through the Tamil Nadu Waqf Board or by the court, functions under the direction of the Board of Trustees and reports to the Managing Trustee.

An eleven-member Advisory Board serves as a supporting body, consisting of three hereditary-trustee representatives, three members elected by shareholders, and five nominees of the Waqf Board or the District Scheme Court. The Advisory Board provides recommendations on financial matters but does not have the authority to increase the budget or take administrative decisions.

All official events and ceremonial arrangements at the dargah are carried out under the supervision of the Board of Trustees, and private events within the premises require prior approval from the administration.

== See also ==
- Ajmer Sharif Dargah
- Erwadi
- Islam in India
- List of dargahs in Tamil Nadu
- List of mosques in India
