= Nagore Shahul Hamid =

Mystic saint and Islamic preacher

Syed Abdul Qadir Shah al-Hameed Nagoori
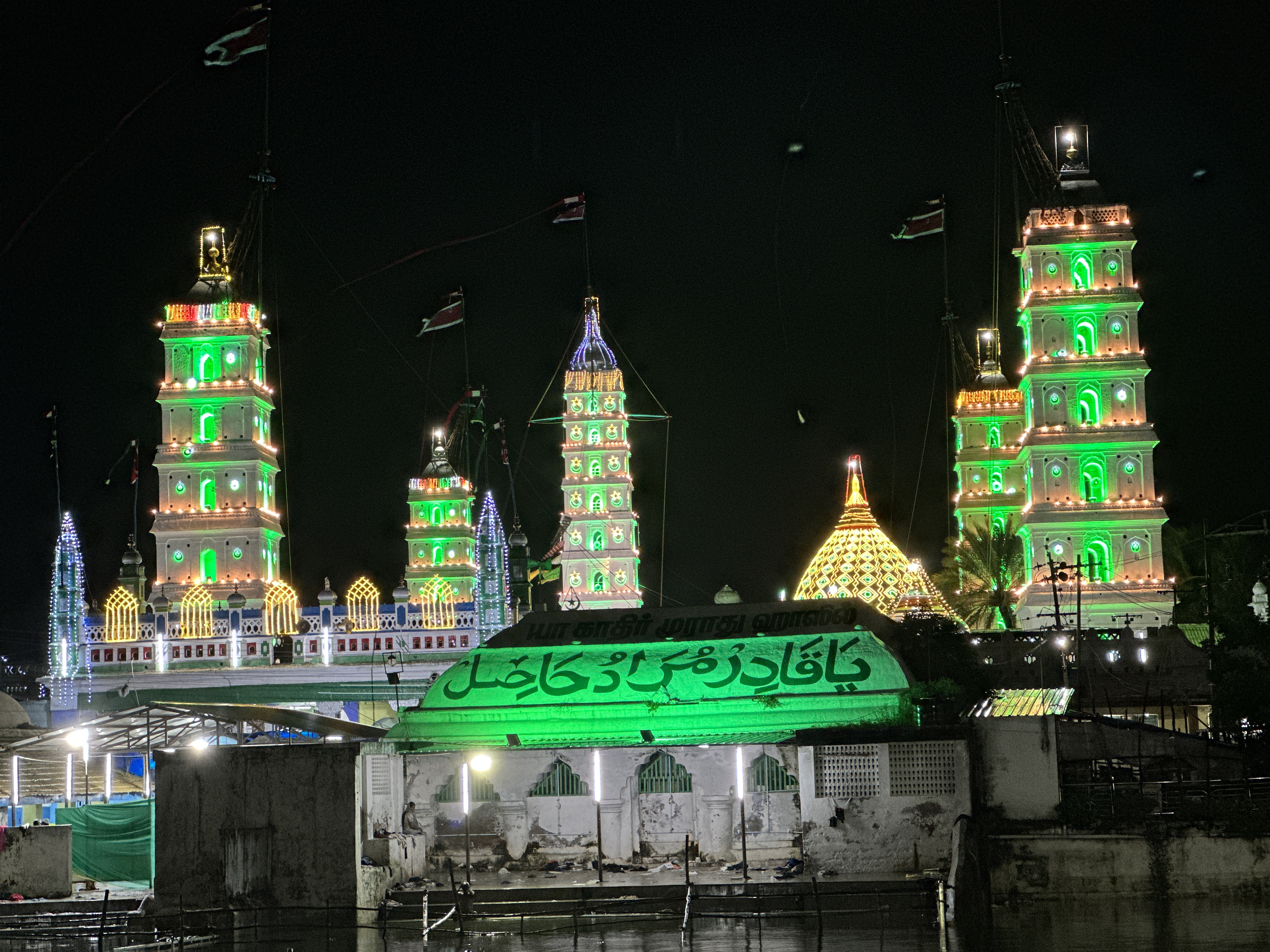

Qutb al-Majeed fard al-Waheed, Imam al-Awaliya
- Born: 1504; Pratapgarh, Delhi Sultanate
- Died: 1570 (aged 65–66); Nagore, Thanjavur Nayak kingdom
- Venerated in: Islam
- Major shrine: Nagore Dargah, Tamil Nadu, India

Qutb al-Majeed Fard al-Waheed Imam al-Awliya as-Syed Abdul Qadir Shah al-Hamid Khadir Wali Suhrawardi (1504 – 1570) was a mystic saint, Islamic preacher in Tamil Nadu and a 13th generation descendant of the renowned Sufi saint, Syed Abd al-Qadir al-Jilani. His resting place is located at Nagore, Tamil Nadu, India.

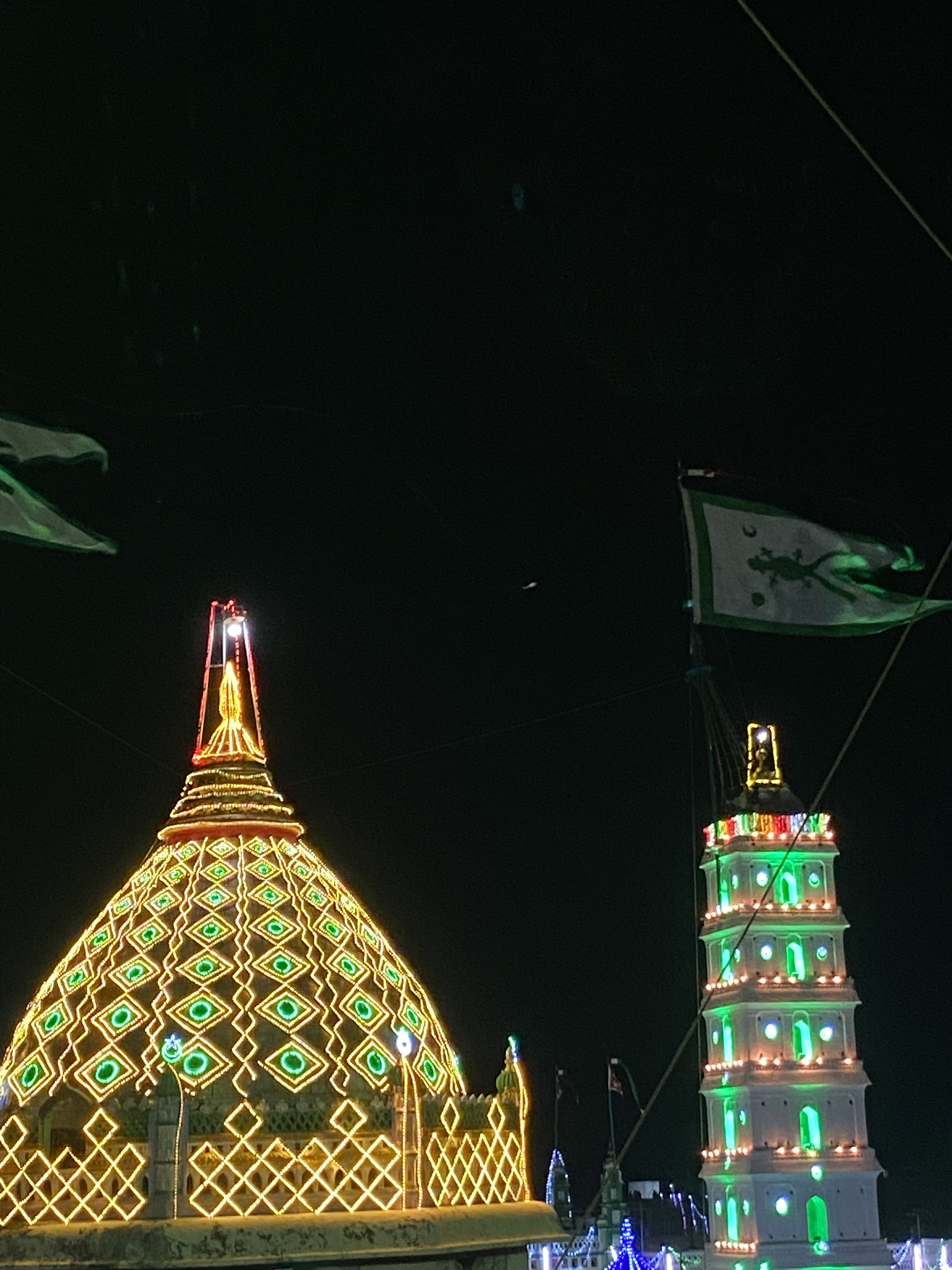
Shrine of Nagore Shahul Hamid, Nagore Dargah Shariff

== Early life ==
Shahul Hamid Badusha Kaadiri was born to Syed Hassan Quddus Baba Qadiri and Bibi Fathima at Manickpoor, in Pratapgarh district of Uttar Pradesh. He had his Islamic Spiritual 14 Tariqa sufi education at Gwalior under the guidance of Mohammad Ghouse. He left on pilgrimage to Mecca (makkah) and then moved to Maldives, Sri Lanka and Tamil Nadu with his spiritual team. He led a simple and pious life, but believed to have performed lot of miracles giving him the name Nagore Andavar (meaning Ruler of Nagore). He was also called Meera Saheb.

=== Other Holy Name ===
Devotees is also called Nagore Andavar ( Meaning ruler of nagore ), Qadir wali baba, Qutb al-Majeed, fard al-Waheed, Syedshaathaat, Sayedna Shahul Hameed, Meeran Sulthan, Qadir Wali, Ganj e sawai, Ganj bais, Imam al Awaliya, As-syed Abdul Shah al-Hamid Khadir Wali Nagoori, Meeran sahib, Nagooran, Divine light of South-east Asia, Nagore Bathusha Nayagam.

== History ==
Shahul Hamid Badusha Kaadiri cured King Achutappa Nayak (1529–1542 A.D.), a Hindu ruler of Thanjavur of his physical affliction believed to be caused by a sorcery. Shahul Hamid found a pigeon struck with pins in the palace attic to be the cause of the misery. He removed the pins from the pigeon resulting in the king's health improvement. The ruler was satisfied and in return donated 200 acres of land to the entourage. In remembrance of the event, the practise of setting pigeons free is continued by worshippers. In the last quarter of the 18th century, when the conflict between European powers, the nawab, the Maratha kings and Tipu Sultan of Mysore all came in focus of Thanjavur domain, the dargah was in focus for this strategic rivalry.

== Architecture of Nagore Dargah ==
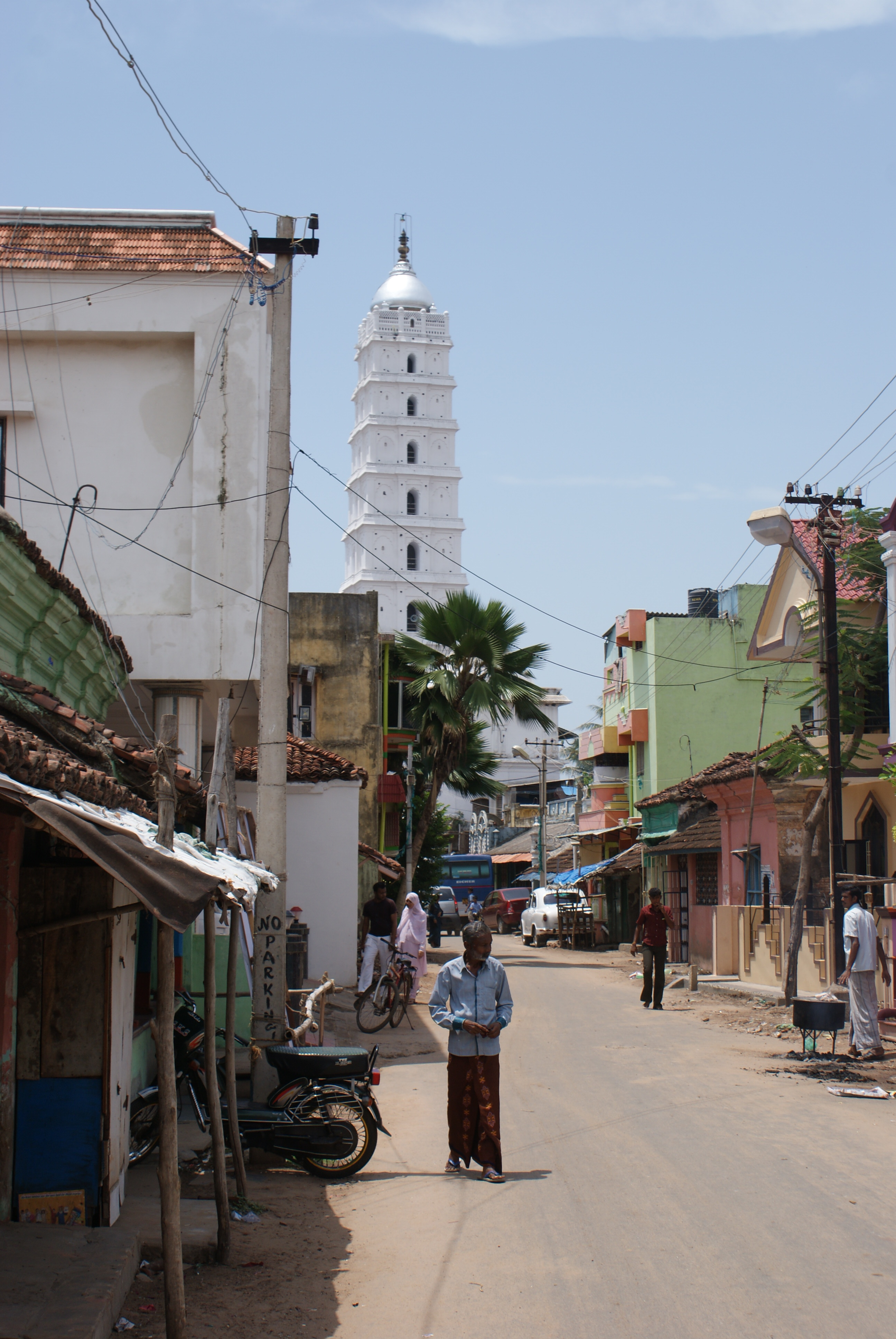
The tallest minaret of the dargah

It is believed that 60 percent of the shrines were built by Hindus Pratap Singh (1739–1763 A.D.), the Hindu Maratha ruler of Thanjavur, built one of the five and the tallest minaret (periya manara) with a height of 131 feet. This minaret is located on the west face just outside the main darwaza. This was erected 195 years after Shahul's era. As a mark of respect people also Venerate the sandals of the saint which are preserved in the shrine. The central part of the dargah is the tomb of the saint, Shahul Hamid, who is a direct descendant of Mohammed, through his grandson Hassan, through Abdel Khader Gilani, Sultanul Awliya, and approached through seven thresholds (four made of silver and three of gold). The saint also known as "Ganj e Sawai" meaning the doorway of one and a quarter. Whosoever asks will be bestowed with plenty "Barakah" as per the custom of giving a little more. Since the saint was celibate he is offered a "Sehra" and not the customary chadar of flowers as at other dargahs. He was approached by a childless couple who were told they would be blessed with children but the first offspring would be his, meaning would be presented to him to adopt. There is a shrine for Shahul Hameed adopted son Yusuf and wife Syed Sultan (Sayid Sultan) Beevi. The doors of the shrines are open only during early morning and evening. Currently there are approximately 1500 male descendants, who are called Mujawars. There is a hereditary Kalifa, from among the descendants of the saint Yusuf (the adopted son, who is a saint in his own right). He is recognised as the first hereditary kalifa, the first born of the first born. This kalifa performs all the official religious duties. The work of administration and maintenance is the responsibility of a committee who operate under a scheme decreed by the Madras High Court.

There is big tank within the precincts, called "Shifa gunta", and its waters are held sacred. anyone bathing therein is cured of many maladies. In the Nakaiyanthathi, the Tamil devotional poems, there is a mention about the tank as a haven of sweetness and comfort bedecked with the auspicious lotus.

There are other shrines built in his honour in Penang (Malaysia) and Singapore.The Singapore dargah has been built during 1827 and 1830 A.D. and has been declared a national monument. The above shrines along with the Masjid Jame at Chulia in Singapore and the Keramat Data Koya in Penang are influenced by the style of Nagore Dargah.

== Festivals ==
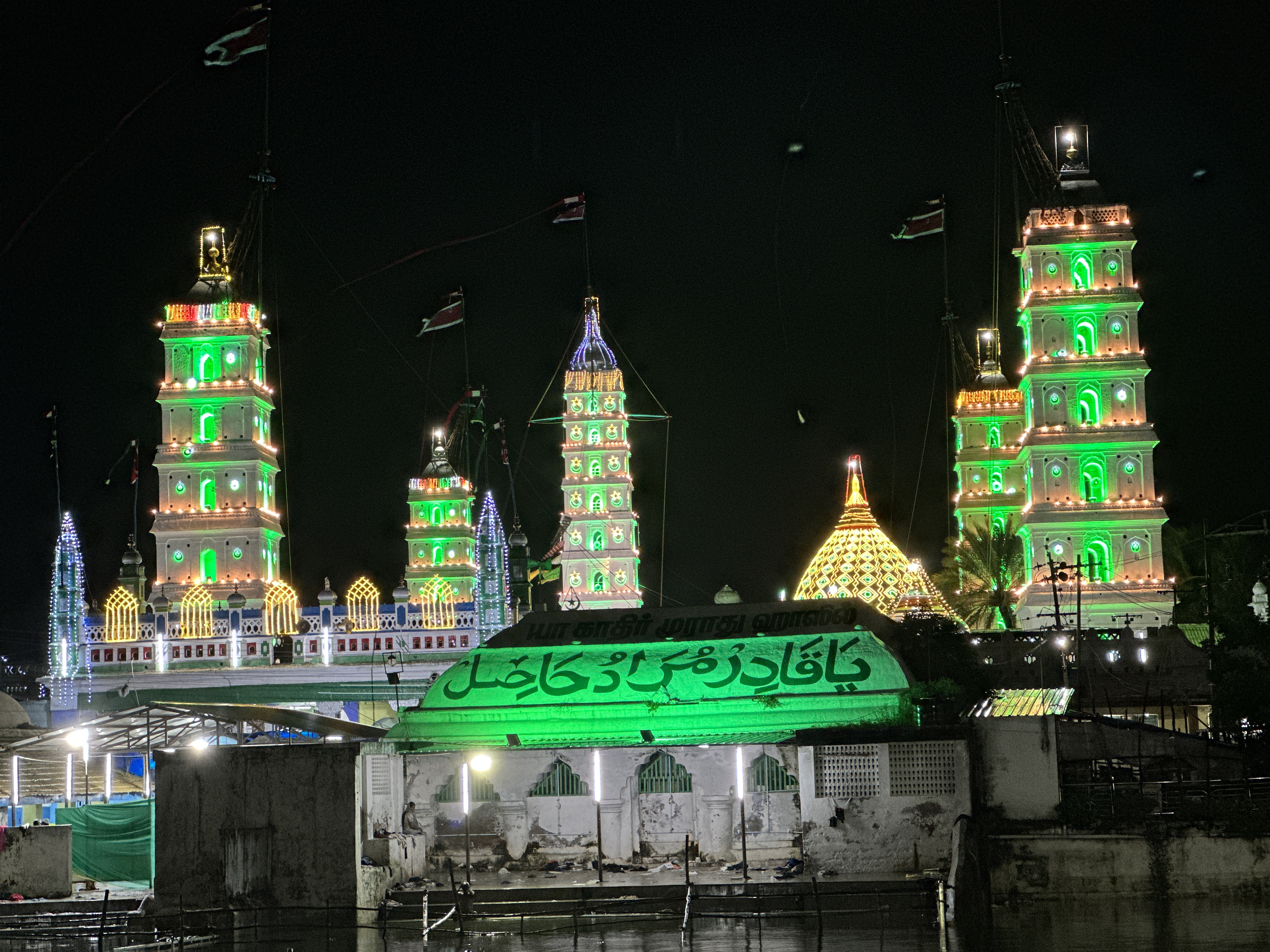
Nagore Dargah Festival 2024

Kanduri festival is a 14‑day event celebrated for the annual urs(anniversary) of the saint. The urs is celebrated in commemoration of the anniversary of the saint's death, and pilgrims participate in the rituals and rites. The word kanduri is derived from Persian word for tablecloth. The festival is also called Qadir Wali Ke Fande festival. saffron flag carrying ceremony is also observed when the flag is carried in procession from the devotee's house after a procession in streets and hoisted on a tree known as Fande ka Fahad. The Islamic rites include the recitation of Quranic verses and observance of Fatiha ritual. The main attraction of the festival is the presence of Fakhir Jamas(mendicant priests) and the disciples of the saint who witness the festival. On the 9th day of Jamathul Akhir month, at 10 p.m., one of the disciples (called pir) is chosen for the spiritual exercise of offering prayers to the saint. The pir throws lemons at the end of the prayers on the devotees, which is believed to provide miraculous relief to worldly sorrows. The festival is also seen as a sacred exchange between Hindus and Muslims expressing solidarity of mixed faith in the region In the evening of the ninth day of Akhir month, the chariot containing sandal paste is pulled by the pilgrims and devotees accompanied by banging of instruments across the streets of Nagore. The sandal paste is received by the saint's descendants and used to anoint the Rowla Sharif of the saint by the spiritual successor (Kalifa) of the dargah.

== Worship and Rituals ==
Dargah is a commonplace of veneration of devotees of various religious faiths. Muslims believe that the saint is one who is close to God, hence they seek assistance either asking God through this holy saint's closeness that he has to God, or, ask the saint himself based on the powers that God has bestowed upon the saint, due to his closeness and acts of worships he has done in his lifetime. The reason being is that Muslims believe that a soul doesn't cease to exist after death, but instead it transcends to the next realm. A realm where the soul is more powerful, as it is no more bound to the physical needs and requirement such as hunger, thirst and tiredness. This isn't an act that ascribes a partner to God (commonly known as Shirk), as the fundamental belief is that all powers are from the one and only, the most powerful God.

Other worship practises that can be found there, but not necessarily affiliated to Islam are offering flags and lighting lamps of ghee at the saint's tomb. Devotees shave their heads near the tank and offer tin or silver-plated facsimiles of body parts, houses, sailboats matching their material needs, but this is not what most of the native muslims there do as worship, and as the saint had cured the ruler of the tanajvur, many hindus visit the place often as a way of respect for their help.
