= Nagore =

- Town
- Nagore
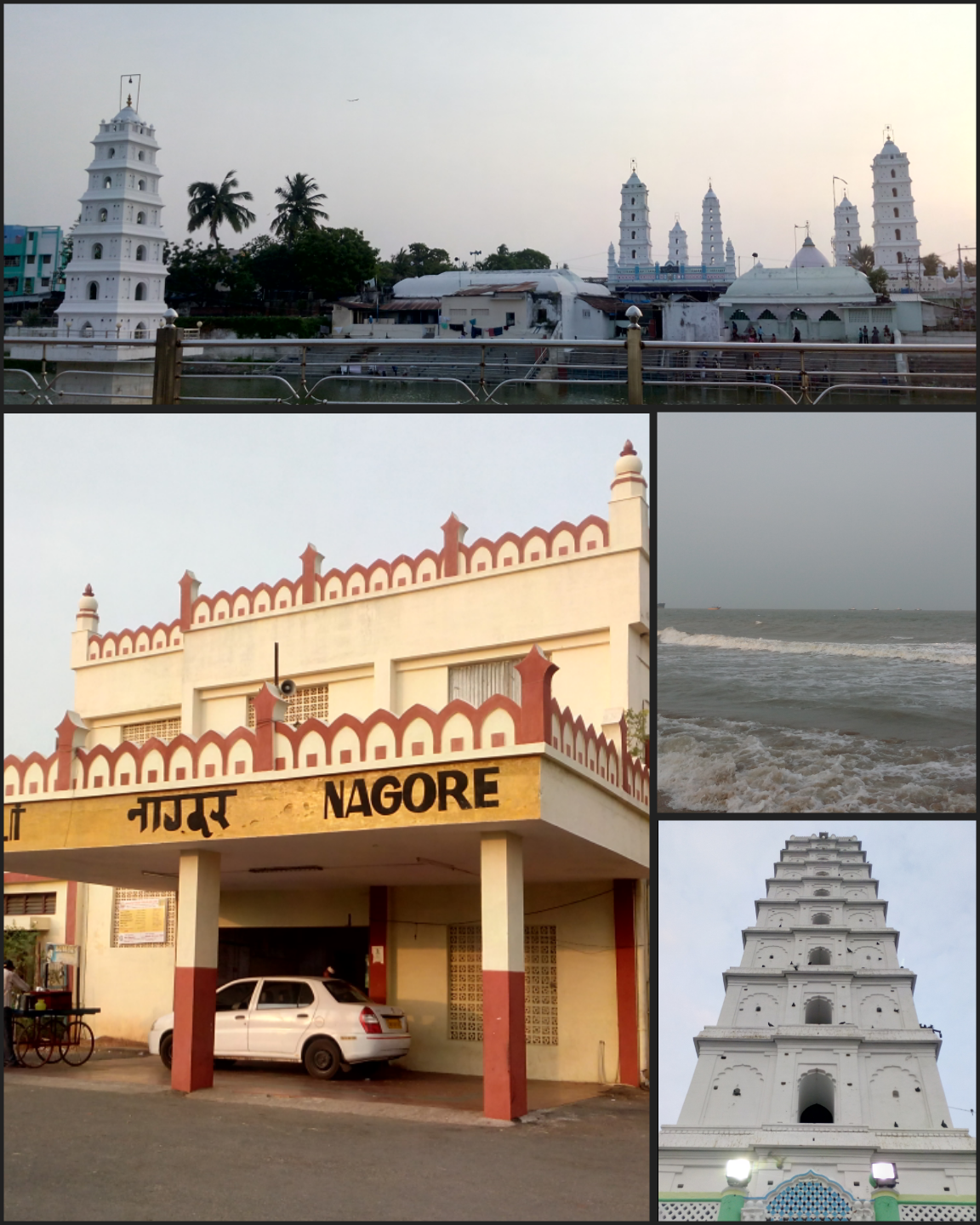
- Montage of Nagore Clockwise from Top to Bottom:Nagore Dargah Shariff, Nagore Beach, Tallest Minaret, Nagore Railway station
- Nickname: Nagoor
- Location in Tamil Nadu, India
- Coordinates: 10.82°N 79.85°E
- Country: India
- State: Tamil Nadu
- District: Nagapattinam
- Established: 1803
- Named for: Nagore

Area
  - Total: 8 km^{2} (3.1 sq mi)

Population (2001)
  - Total: 39,000
  - Density: 4,900/km^{2} (13,000/sq mi)

Languages
  - Official: Tamil
- Time zone: UTC+5:30 (IST)
- PIN: 611002
- Telephone code: 04365
- Vehicle registration: TN51
- Nearest city: Nagapattinam, Velankanni, Karaikal
- Lok Sabha constituency: Nagapattinam

Nagore is a town in the Nagapattinam District, Tamil Nadu, India. It is located approximately 12 km South of Karaikal and 5 km North of Nagapattinam. Nearby towns are Karaikal, Tiruvarur, and Velankanni. It has a population of approximately 39,000. The prime attraction of the town is the Nagore Dargah Shareef. A sixteenth-century Islamic shrine, Nagore Dargah attracts millions of pilgrims irrespective of caste, creed or religion.

== Specialty ==
Nagore is the border line town between Tamilnadu and Puducherry. Beach is very neat and calm which is tail end of river Cauvery. District collector offices is just 3 km away from this town.

== Unique foods ==
- "Dumroot" [Sweet] which is one variety of halwa made by wheat
- "Kolameen" [Fish] which is available seasonally
- "Vaada" [Snacks] unique snacks item like vadai
- "Ganda" [Snacks] unique snacks item like Potato

Anjee Kari Soru, Potti Soru,

== Transport ==
=== By Air ===
- Chennai International Airport 290 km
- Tiruchirappalli International Airport 147 km

=== By Rail ===
- Nagore station in 1 km from Nagore Dargah
- Nagapattinam junction in 7 km
- Karaikal station in 12 km
- Thiruvarur junction in 26 km
- Tanjore junction in 96 km
- Thiruchirapalli junction in 145 km
