= Martiros =

Martiros is an Armenian given name meaning martyr.

Martiros and its variant Mardiros in Western Armenian may refer to:

== Places ==
- Martiros, Vayots Dzor, town in Armenia

== Persons ==
=== Martiros ===
- Saint Martiros, 4th-century Christian saint, son of Saint Sarkis the Warrior
- Martiros of Crimea, 7th-century Armenian writer, historian, poet and priest
- Martiros Aslanov (1897–1977), Soviet Armenian linguist and Pashto scholar
- Martiros Kavoukjian (1908–1988), Armenian architect, researcher, Armenologist and historian-archaeologist
- Martiros Khan Davidkhanian (1843–1905), Iranian general, philanthropist and professor
- Martiros Sarukhanyan (1873–1895), Armenian fedayee and political activist in the Ottoman Empire
- Martiros Saryan (1880–1972), Armenian painter

=== Mardiros ===
- Mardiros of Egypt, Armenian Patriarch of Jerusalem from 1419 to 1430 (See list)
- Mardiros I of Constantinople, Armenian Patriarch of Constantinople from 1509 to 1526 (See list)
- Mardiros II of Constantinople (Kefetsi), Armenian Patriarch of Constantinople from 1659 to 1660 (See list)
- Mardiros III of Constantinople (Yerzngatsi) Armenian Patriarch of Constantinople in 1706 (See list)
- Mardiros Altounian (1889–1958), Lebanese Armenian architect
- Mardiros Tchaparian, known as Mardik, Lebanese footballer

== See also ==
- Martirosyan (includes Mardirosian / Mardirossian)
