= Shawaka =

Old locality in Baghdad, Iraq

Al-Shawaka منطقة الشواكة
- Urban area
- Al-Shawaka as seen behind Haifa Street

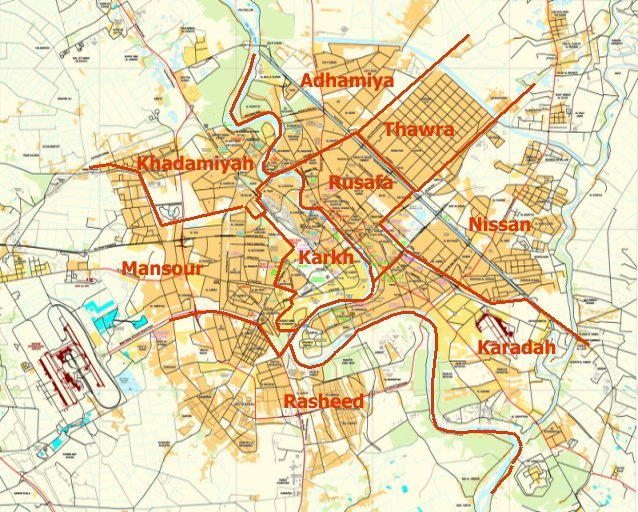
- Country: Iraq
- Governorate: Baghdad Governorate
- First settled: Abbasid Caliphate
- Time zone: UTC+3

Al-Shawaka (Arabic: الشواكة), or just Shawaka, is one of the oldest settlements and urban areas in Baghdad, Iraq, that dates back to the era of the Abbasid Caliphate. Located between the Tigris river, and the Haifa Street complex, it composes of several traditional neighborhoods and many souks, alleyways, and religious compounds. The main souk of the locality is Souk al-Shawaka.

Archeological and significant landmarks in the general area include the Abbasid Qamariyya Mosque, Bayt al-Wattar, the fish market, and the shrines of Habib al-Ajami, and allegedly al-Khidr's.

== Historical background ==
Dating back to the Abbasid Caliphate, al-Shawaka has historically been one of the most populated areas in Baghdad. Due to its significant location on the shores of the Tigris river, the area saw a large commercial and social prescience. Making it one of the most densely populated areas in Baghdad historically. Al-Shawaka is also defined by its significant hold to old Arab customs and traditions. The area's present name comes from thistles (Known in Arabic as "Shawak") which were brought into the area in the 19th century by Bayt al-Sufa, a merchant family. The use of thistles in the area expanded, including its use as perfume during the summer and usage in the rope business, giving the area its present name.

In the 1970s and 1980s, the area began to flourish when the Haifa Street complex project was completed. Although the project made the area significantly smaller, it also helped it flourish commercially. In the present, al-Shawaka became neglected by the Iraqi government. After the US-led invasion of Iraq in 2003, the area was targeted by many terrorist incidents. Effectively worsening the situation in the area. The area suffers from lack of maintenance on houses and markets, stagnant water, blocked sewers, and the rise of commercial real estate.

=== Shrine of al-Khidr ===
Located between the main road and the Tigris River, the Shrine of al-Khidr, also known as al-Khidr Elias Mosque, was established originally by Dawud Pasha. In the area, he built shops, and an endowment. So was the case for the mosque, which is located in the Ra's al-Jisr neighborhood. It was then given to a scholar named Muhammad Sa'id al-Suwaidi to study in it. The pasha built it on the condition that it be an old mosque, and he stipulated in his endowment some allowances for the teacher, the imam, the perfumer, the servant, and the muezzin. Today, the complex has a large courtyard, and a wooden-roofed prayer hall. It is visited by Muslims, both Sunni and Shi'i, and Christians.

== Places of interest ==
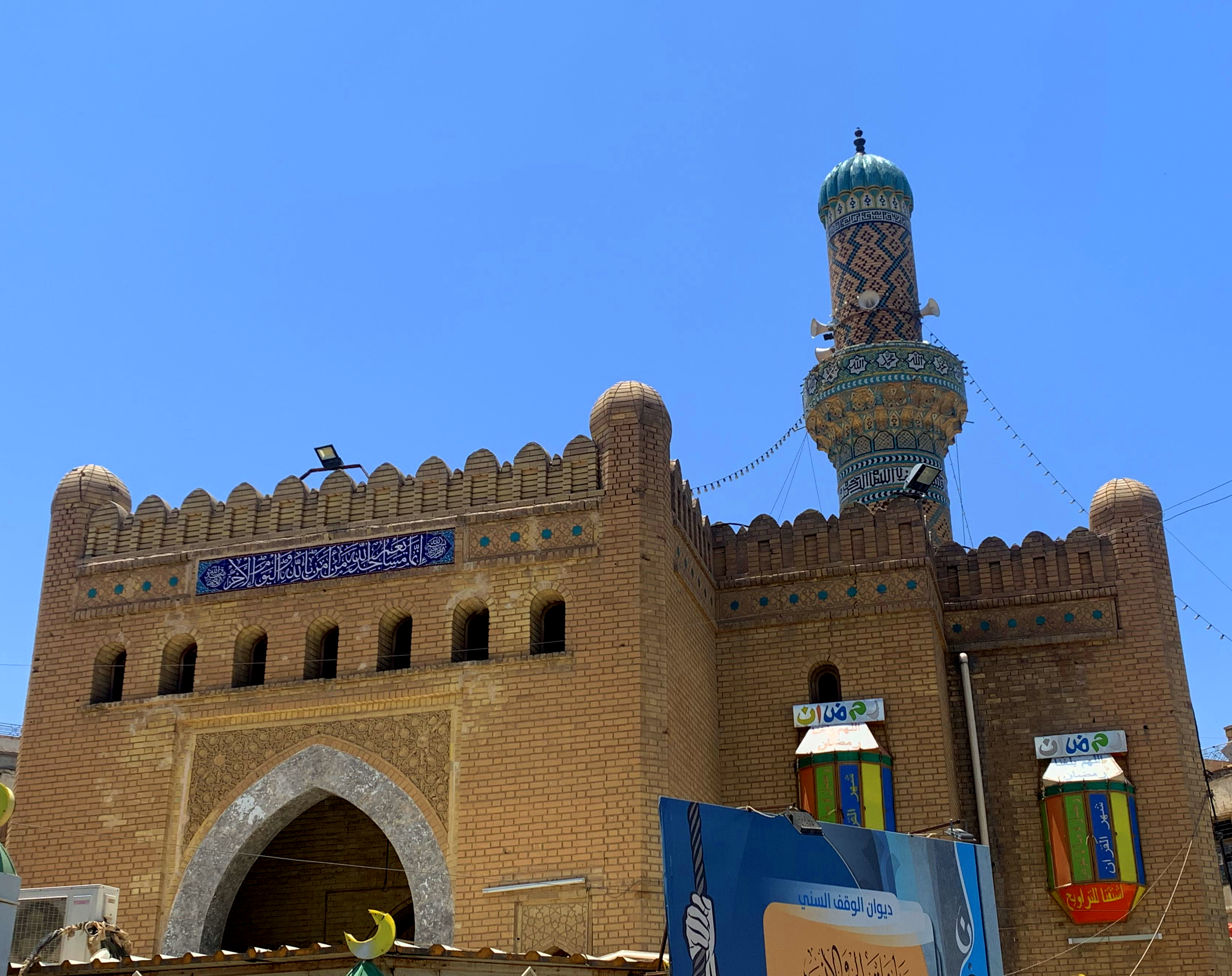
The Hanan Mosque, facing in front of al-Shuhada Bridge.

=== Heritage houses and schools ===
- Bayt al-Wattar, preserved old traditional Baghdadi house.
- Bayt al-Shawy, another old traditional house.
- Al-Karkh Girls' Secondary School.
- Haifa Street apartments, Ba'ath era apartments.
- Al-Shima'a Elementary School for Girls.

=== Markets and other establishments ===
- Bab al-Saif market.
- The fish market.
- Al-Tatanji Café, a coffeehouse located in front of al-Shuhada Bridge.
- Souk al-Shawaka, the main market of the area.

=== Religious buildings ===
- Atta Mosque, Ottoman era mosque.
- Al-Hanan Mosque.
- Al-Khidr Elias Mosque, archeological and religious site.
- Bab al-Saif Grand Husseiniyya.
- Qamariyya Mosque, preserved Abbasid era mosque.
- Sheikh Sandal Mosque.
- Shrine of Habib al-Ajami, the mausoleum of Abbasid era Sufi Mystic Habib al-Ajami.

== See also ==
- Al-Karkh
- Trastevere
