= Driss Debbagh =

Moroccan politician (1921–1986)

- إدريس الدباغ
- Born: November 7, 1921; Marrakesh, Morocco
- Died: 1986 (aged 64–65)
- Citizenship: Morocco
- Education: Bachelor's degree in chemical engineering from L'École Nationale Supérieure des Arts et Industries Textiles de Roubaix, France (1950)
- Occupations: Diplomat, politician, businessman
- Known for: Ambassador of Morocco to Italy, Minister of Commerce, Industry, Mining and Merchant Navy

Driss Debbagh (Arabic: إدريس الدباغ; November 7, 1921 – 1986) was a Moroccan politician. He was an ambassador to Italy (1959–1961) and a minister of commerce, industry, mining and merchant navy (from June 1963 to November 1963). He was also vice-president and chairman of Banque Commerciale du Maroc.

Driss Debbagh was the son of Tayed ibn Brahim Debbagh and his second wife Zahra bint Mohammed Soussi. He was fluent in Berber, Arabic, French, English and Italian. He lived in France in the end of the 1940s and he received a bachelor in chemical engineering in 1950 from L'École Nationale Supérieur des Arts et Industries Textiles de Roubaix, France. He returned to Morocco and became the president of the royal federation of aeronautic sports in 1957.

== Awards ==
Driss Debbagh while Ambassador of Morocco to Italy meeting the president of Italia Giovanni Gronchi (c. 1960)

- Knight of the Grand Cross of the Order of Merit of the Republic of Italy (Italian: Cavaliere di Gran Croce Ordine al Merito della Repubblica Italiana)
- While he was ambassador in Rome, H.E. Driss Debbagh received a distinction from Pope John XXIII. (Italian: S.E.)

== Sources ==
- Driss Debbagh Ambassador of Morocco to Rome from 1959 to 1961 (Italian)
- History of the governments, Driss Debbagh minister of commerce, industry, mining and merchant navy from June 1963 to November 1963, ministerial changes of the 8th government (French)
- Pure Gold, translation of the book Al-Ibriz in English ISBN 978-90-04-16415-4 (in English), ISBN 978-2-914916-97-4 (in French)

== See also ==
- Portrait of Driss Debbagh
- Mohammed al-Mokhtar Soussi
