= Eid Khidr Elias =

Iraqi, Yazidi, and Turkmen holiday

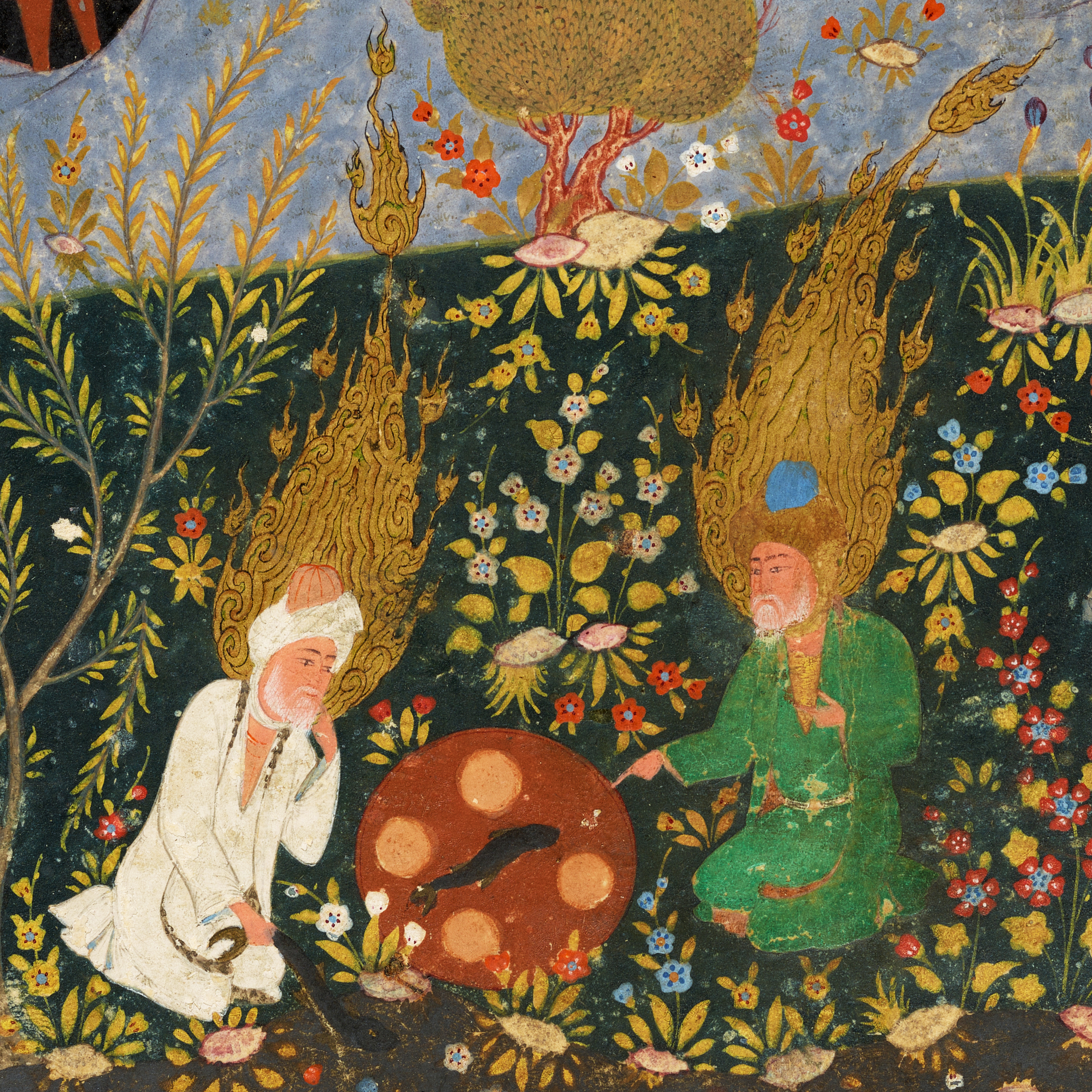
Persian manuscript depicting al-Khidr and Elias sitting at the fountain of life, 1548.

Eid Khidr Elias (Arabic: عيد خضر إلياس) is a holiday celebrated by Iraqis, Yazidis, and Turkmens every year in February. The holiday revolves around the mythical figure of al-Khidr. During the holiday, candles are lit and thrown into the Tigris river at sunset, asking for the fulfillment of wishes and prayers. Ziyarat are practiced to the shrine of al-Khidr, located in Shawaka on the banks of the Tigris in Baghdad, Iraq. Social gatherings also occur. The holiday is also significant within Iraqi Yazidis in Northern Iraq and other Yazidis. Due to the significance of al-Khidr in Yazidi lore, the holiday is celebrated in the second week of February, typically called "purity week" of each year according to the Yazidi Eastern calendar. Fasting, special meals, and community activities are special features that Yazidis observe during the holiday.

== Khidr Elias as world heritage ==
Inscribed in 2016, the holiday, as well as practices around Baghdad's al-Khidr Shrine, is recognized by UNESCO on its Representative List of the Intangible Cultural Heritage of Humanity as an important traditional Iraqi holiday.
