= Khidr =

Quranic figure in Islamic tradition

الخضر al-Khiḍr
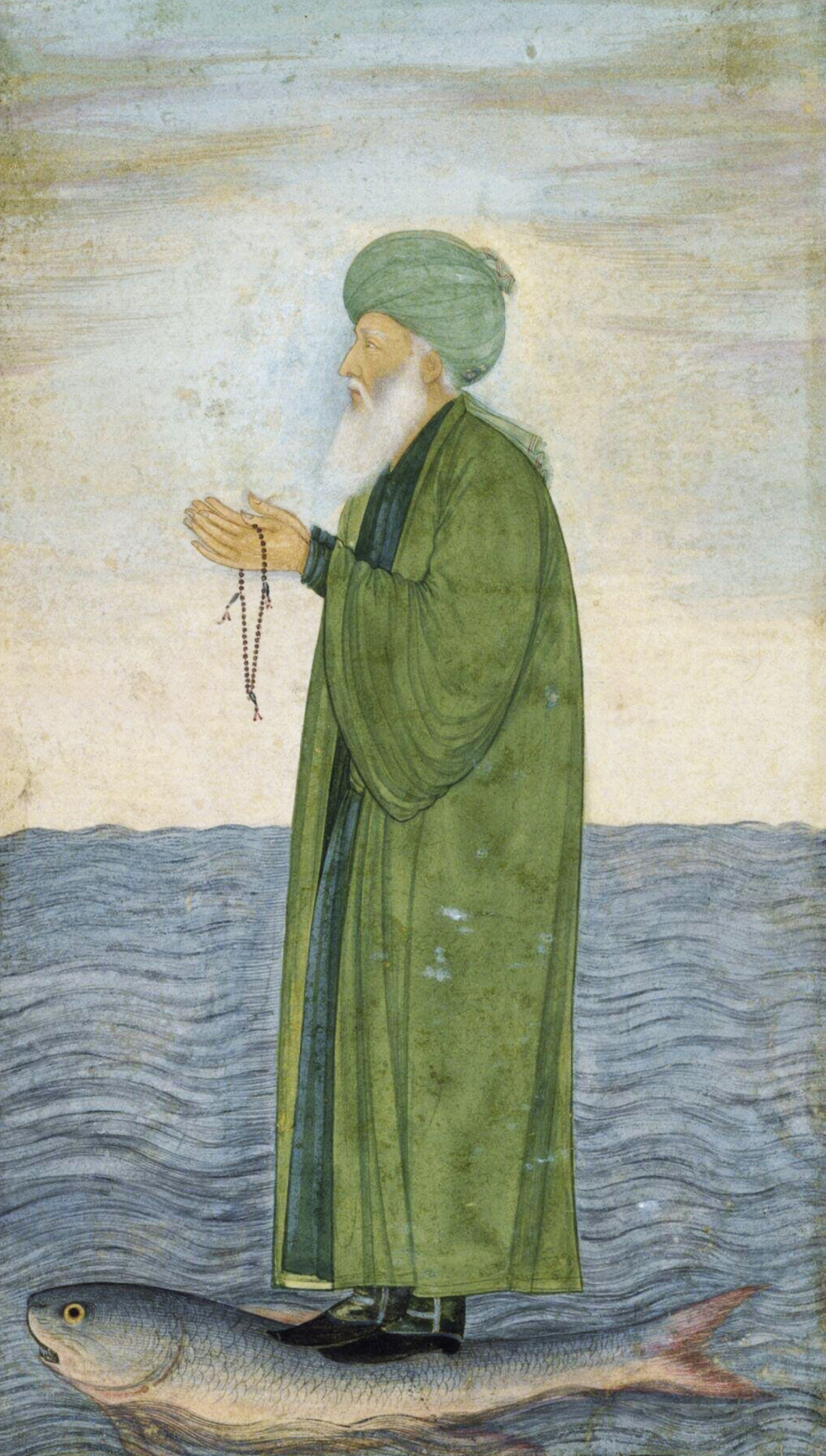

Mystic, Green One, The Verdant One, Teacher of the Prophets, Sayyidina, Guide
- Venerated in: Islam; Druze
- Predecessor: Yusha bin Nun
- Successor: Luqman

Khidr (Arabic: الخضر, romanized: al-Khiḍr (Note: Also Romanized as al-Khadir, Khader, Khidr, Hidr, Khizr, Kezr, Kathir, Khazer, Khadr, Khedher, Khizir, Khizar.)) is a Qur'anic figure of Islam. He is described in Surah al-Kahf as a righteous servant of God possessing great wisdom or mystic knowledge. In various Islamic and non-Islamic traditions, Khidr is described as an angel, prophet, or wali (saint), who guards the sea, teaches secret knowledge and aids those in distress. He prominently figures as patron of the Islamic saint Ibn Arabi. The figure of al-Khidr has been syncretized over time with various other figures including Dūraoša and Sorūsh in Iran, Sargis the General and Saint George in Asia Minor and the Levant, Elijah in Judaism and among the Druze, John the Baptist in Armenia, Buddha in some medieval Islamic writings, and Jhulelal in Sindh and Punjab in South Asia. He is commemorated on the holiday of Hıdırellez.

Though not mentioned by name in the Quran, he is named by Islamic scholars as the figure described in Quran 18:65–82 as a servant of God who has been given "knowledge" and who is accompanied and questioned by the prophet Musa (Moses) about the many seemingly unfair or inappropriate actions he (Khidr) takes (damaging a ship, killing a young man, repaying inhospitality by repairing a wall). At the end of the story, Khidr explains the circumstances unknown to Moses that made each of the actions fair and appropriate.

== Etymology ==
The name al-Khiḍr shares exactly the same triliteral root as the Arabic al-akhḍar or al-khaḍra, a root found in several Semitic languages meaning "green" or "verdant" (as in al-Qubbah al-Khaḍrā’ or the Green Dome). Therefore, the meaning of the name has traditionally been taken to be "the Green One" or "the Verdant One". Some contemporary scholars have disagreed with this assessment; however, some others point to a possible reference to the Mesopotamian figure Utnapishtim from the Epic of Gilgamesh through the Arabization of his nickname, Hasisatra. According to another view, the name Khidr is not an Arabic variant or an abbreviation of Hasisatra, but it may have been derived from the name of the Canaanite god Kothar-wa-Khasis and later it may have been assimilated to the Arabic al-akhḍar. Finally, it has been suggested that the name of Khidr is derived from Arabic haḍara, a verb meaning 'to be present' or 'be in the presence', and it was explained over time by a similar Arabic word meaning 'green'.

== Quranic narrative ==
In the Quran 18:65–82, Moses meets the Servant of God, referred to in the Quran as "one of our slaves whom We had granted mercy from Us and whom We had taught knowledge from Ourselves". Muslim scholars identify him as Khiḍr, although he is not explicitly named in the Quran and there is no reference to him being immortal or being especially associated with esoteric knowledge or fertility. These associations come in later scholarship on al-Khiḍr.

The Quran states that they meet at the junction of two seas, where a fish that Moses and his servant had intended to eat has escaped. Moses asks for permission to accompany the Servant of God so Moses can learn "right knowledge of what [he has] been taught". The Servant informs him that "Surely you [Moses] cannot have patience with me. And how can you have patience about things about which your understanding is not complete?" Moses promises to be patient and obey him unquestioningly, and they set out together. After they board a ship, the Servant of God damages the vessel. Forgetting his oath, Moses says, "Have you made a hole in it to drown its inmates? Certainly you have done a grievous thing." The Servant reminds Moses of his warning, "Did I not say that you will not be able to have patience with me?" and Moses pleads not to be rebuked.

Next, the Servant of God kills a young man. Moses again cries out in astonishment and dismay, and again the Servant reminds Moses of his warning, and Moses promises that he will not violate his oath again, and that if he does he will excuse himself from the Servant's presence. They then proceed to a town where they are denied hospitality. This time, instead of harming anyone or anything, the Servant of God restores a decrepit wall in the village. Yet again Moses is amazed and violates his oath for the third and last time, asking why the Servant did not at least exact "some recompense for it."

The Servant of God replies, "This shall be separation between me and you; now I will inform you of the significance of that with which you could not have patience. Many acts which seem to be evil, malicious or somber, actually are merciful. The boat was damaged to prevent its owners from falling into the hands of a king who seized every boat by force. And as for the boy, his parents were believers and we feared lest he should make disobedience and ingratitude to come upon them. God will replace the child with one better in purity, affection and obedience. As for the restored wall, the Servant explained that underneath the wall was a treasure belonging to two helpless orphans whose father was a righteous man. As God's envoy, the Servant restored the wall, showing God's kindness by rewarding the piety of the orphans' father, and so that when the wall becomes weak again and collapses, the orphans will be older and stronger and will take the treasure that belongs to them."

== Reports in the Hadith ==
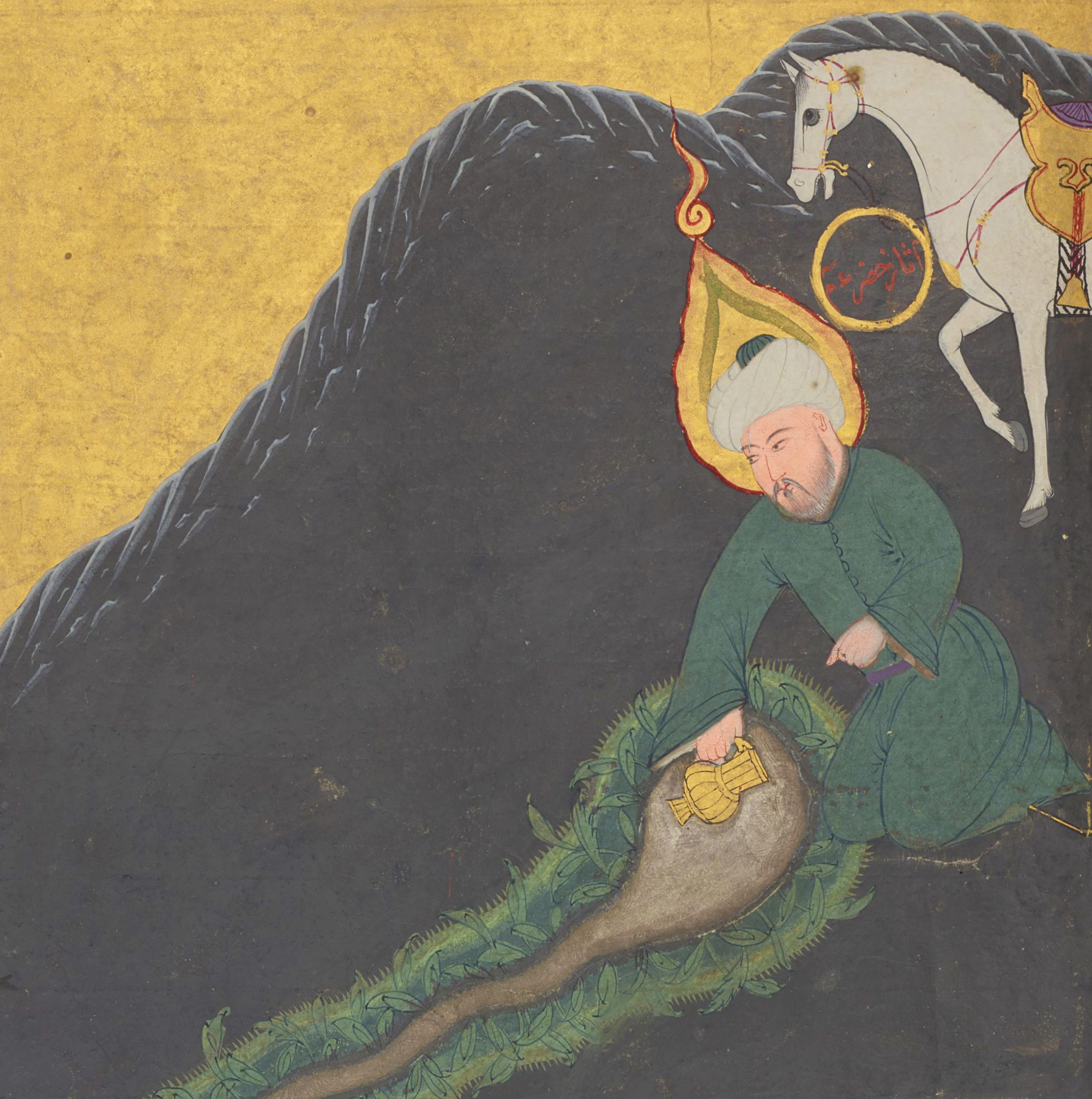
Islamic miniature of Khidr filling his cup at the fountain of life.

Muhammad al-Bukhari reports that al-Khiḍr got his name after he was present over the surface of some ground that became green as a result of his presence there. There are reports from al-Bayhaqi that al-Khiḍr was present at the funeral of Muhammad and was recognized only by Ali from amongst the rest of the companions, and where he came to show his grief and sadness at the death of Muhammad. Al-Khiḍr's appearance at Muhammad's funeral is related as follows: A powerful-looking, fine-featured, handsome man with a white beard came leaping over the backs of the people till he reached where the sacred body lay. Weeping bitterly, he turned toward the Companions and paid his condolences. Ali said that he was Khiḍr.

Muhammad al-Jawad narrates in Kitab al-Kafi that after entering the sacred Mosque in Mecca, Ali, Hasan ibn Ali, and Husayn ibn Ali were visited by a good looking, well dressed man who asked them a series of questions. Hasan answered the questions and upon this, the man testified to the prophet-hood of Muhammad followed by testifying that Ali and his Ahl al-Bayt are the successors and heir to his message. Ali asked Hasan to track the whereabouts of the visitor, but when he could not, Ali revealed the identity of the man to be Khidr.

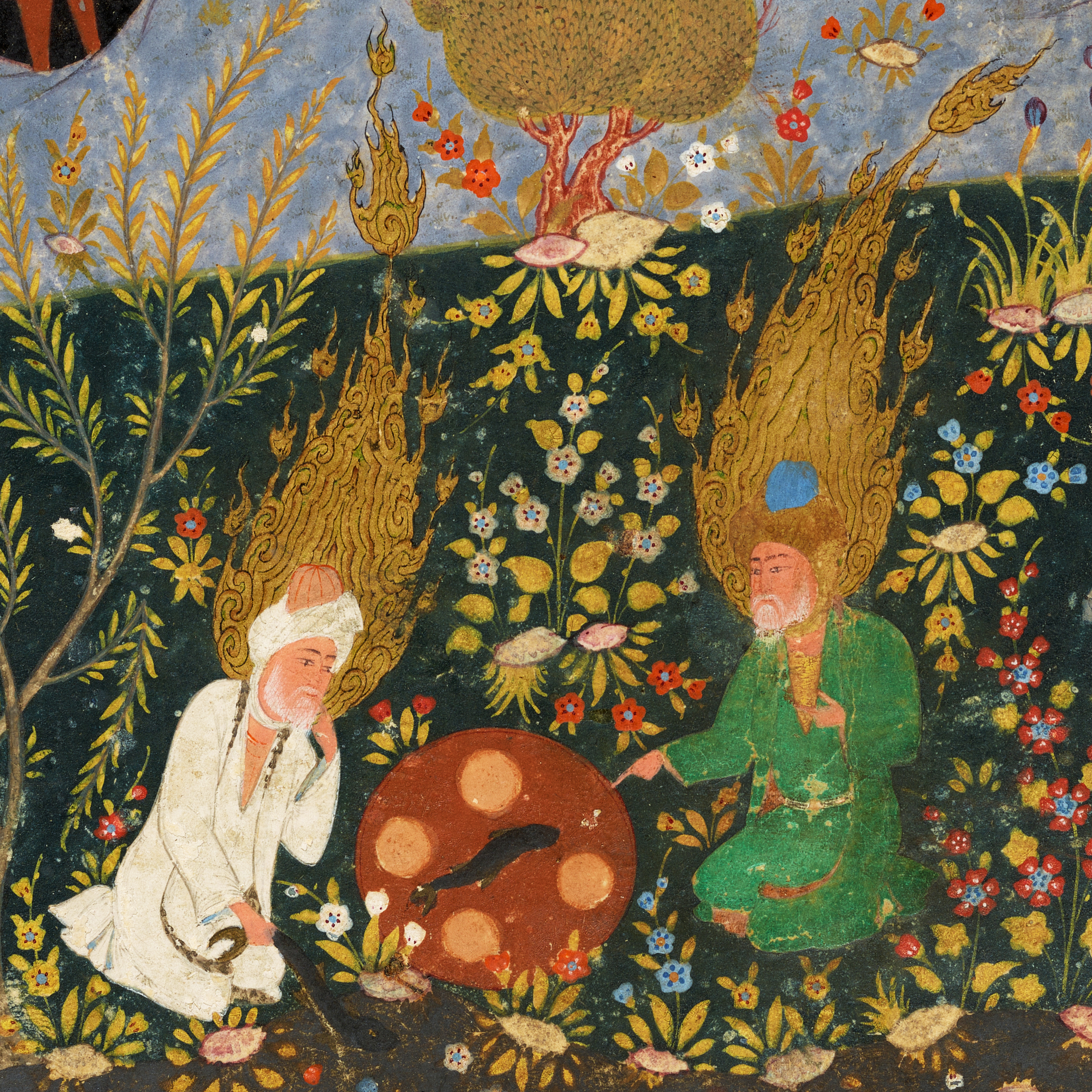
A Persian manuscript depicting Elijah and al-Khiḍr (right) together at the fountain of youth.

The Islamic scholar Said Nursî believed that Khidr, a figure in Islamic tradition, is alive and at the second degree of life. Some religious scholars have doubts about this belief. He said al-Khidr and Elijah were free and able to be present in multiple places at the same time. They do not have to eat or drink and are not restricted by human needs. There is a level of sainthood called "the degree of Khidr" where a person receives instruction from Khidr and meets with him. However, sometimes the person at this level is mistaken for Khidr himself.

== Islamic perspectives ==
In Sunni Islam Persian scholar, historian and exegete of the Qur'an Muhammad ibn Jarir al-Tabari, writes about Khidr in a chapter of his The History of al-Tabari, called "The Tale of al-Khiḍr and His History; and the History of Moses and His Servant Joshua." Al-Tabari describes several versions of the traditional story surrounding al-Khiḍr. At the beginning of the chapter, al-Tabari explains that in some variations, al-Khiḍr is a contemporary of the mythical Persian king Afridun, who was a contemporary of Abraham, and lived before the days of Moses. Al-Khiḍr is also said to have been appointed to be over the vanguard of the king Dhul-Qarnayn the Elder, who in this version is identified as the king Afridun. In this specific version, al-Khiḍr comes across the River of Life and, unaware of its properties, drinks from it and becomes immortal. Al-Tabari also recounts that al-Khiḍr is said to have been the son of a man who believed in Abraham, and who emigrated with Abraham when he left Babylon.

Al-Khiḍr is also commonly associated with Elijah, even equated with him, and al-Tabari makes a distinction in the next account in which al-Khiḍr is Persian and Elijah is an Israelite. According to this version of al-Khiḍr's story, al-Khiḍr and Elijah meet every year during the annual festival season.

Al-Tabari seems more inclined to believe that al-Khiḍr lived during the time of Afridun before Moses, rather than traveled as Abraham's companion and drank the water of life. He does not state clearly why he has this preference, but rather seems to prefer the chain of sources (the isnad) of the former story rather than the latter.

The various versions in al-Tabari's History more or less parallel each other and the account in the Quran. However, in the stories al-Tabari recounts, Moses claims to be the most knowledgeable man on earth, and God corrects him by telling him to seek out al-Khiḍr. Moses is told to bring a salted fish, and once he found the fish to be missing, he would then find al-Khiḍr. Moses sets out with a travel companion, and once they reach a certain rock, the fish comes to life, jumps into the water, and swims away. It is at this point that Moses and his companion meet al-Khiḍr.

Al-Tabari also adds to lore surrounding the origins of al-Khiḍr's name. He refers to a saying of Muhammad that al-Khiḍr ("the Green" or "the Verdant") was named because he sat on a white fur and it shimmered green with him.

=== In Shia Islam ===
Some Shia Muslims amongst the laity believe al-Khiḍr accompanied Muhammad al-Mahdi in meeting one Sheikh Hassan ibn Muthlih Jamkarani, on 22 February 984 CE (17 Ramadan 373 A.H.) and instructing him to build Jamkaran Mosque at that site of their meeting. The site, six kilometers east of Qom, Iran, has been a pilgrimage destination for the Shia for some time.

In Ismailism, al-Khiḍr is considered one of the 'permanent Imams'; that is, those who have guided people throughout history.

=== In Sufi thought ===
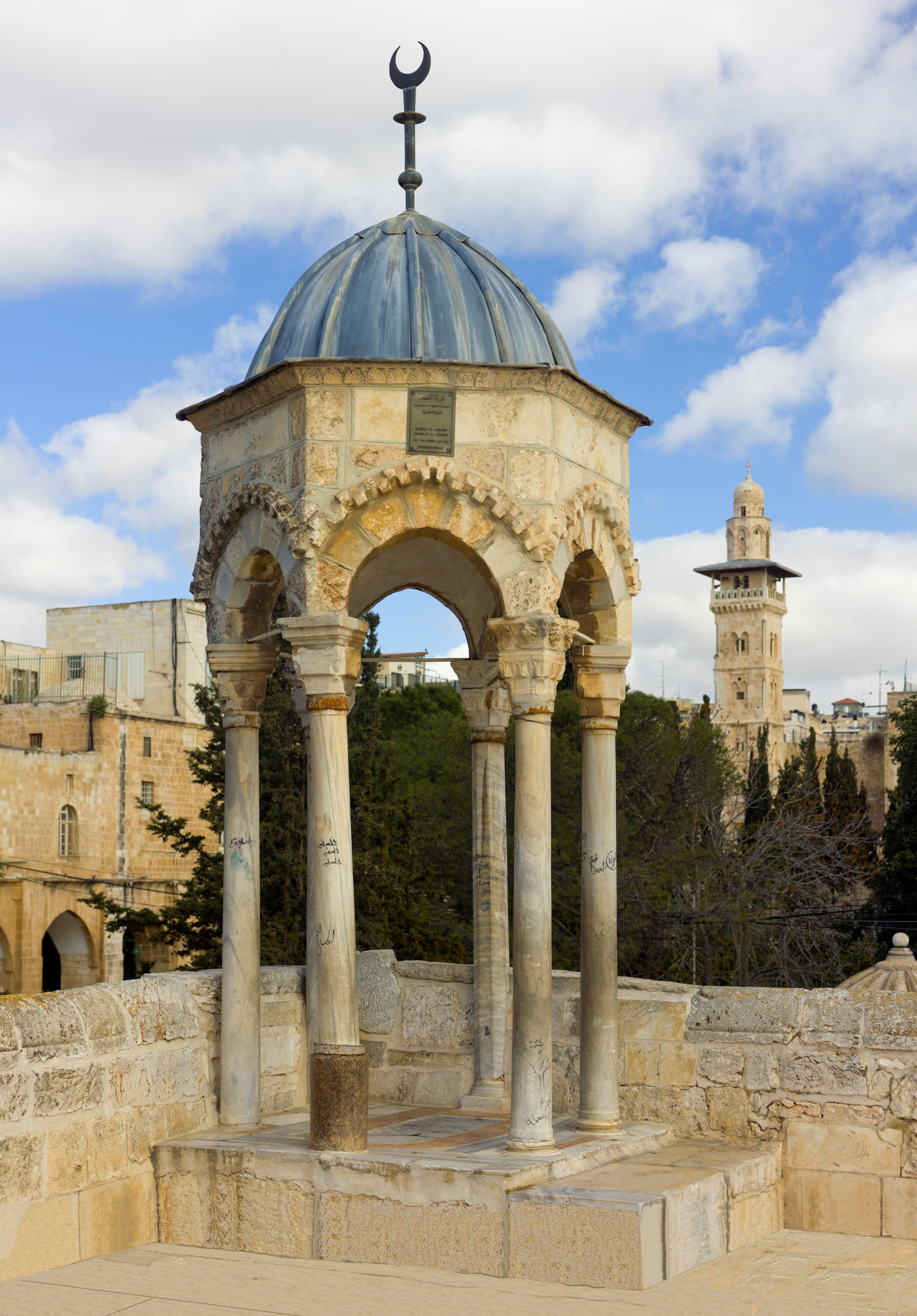
Dome of al-Khidr, al-Aqsa Mosque, Old City of Jerusalem

In Sufi tradition, al-Khiḍr holds a distinguished position as a figure who receives illumination directly from God without human mediation. He is considered to be alive and many respected figures, shaykhs, and prominent leaders in the Sufi community claim to have had personal encounters with him. Examples of those who have claimed this are Abdul-Qadir Gilani, al-Nawawi, Ibn Arabi, Sidi Abdul Aziz ad-Dabbagh and Ahmad ibn Idris al-Fasi. Ibn Ata Allah's Lata'if al-Minan (1:84–98) states that there is consensus among the Sufis that al-Khiḍr is alive.

There are also several Sufi orders that claim origin with al-Khiḍr or that al-Khiḍr is part of their spiritual chain, including the Naqshbandi Haqqani Sufi Order, Muhammadiyah, Idrisiyya and Senussi. He is the hidden initiator for Uwaisi Sufis, who enter the mystical path without being initiated by a living master, instead following the guiding light of earlier masters or, in their belief system, by being initiated by al-Khiḍr. Al-Khiḍr had thus come to symbolize access to the divine mystery (ghayb) itself, and in the writings of Abd al-Karim al-Jili, al-Khiḍr rules over ‘the Men of the Unseen' (rijalu’l-ghayb). Al-Khiḍr is also included among what in classical Sufism are called the ‘’abdāl’’ (‘those who take turns’). In Sufi hierarchy, ‘’abdāl’’ is a mysterious rank of which al-Khiḍr is the spiritual head.

The Sri Lankan Sufi Bawa Muhaiyaddeen also gives a unique account of al-Khiḍr. Al-Khiḍr was on a long search for God, until God, out of his mercy, sends the Archangel Gabriel to guide him. Gabriel appears to al-Khiḍr as a wise human sage, and al-Khiḍr accepts him as his teacher. Gabriel teaches al-Khiḍr much in the same way as al-Khiḍr later teaches Moses in the Quran, by carrying out seemingly unjust actions. Al-Khiḍr repeatedly breaks his oath not to speak out against Gabriel's actions, and is still unaware that the human teacher is actually Gabriel. Gabriel then explains his actions, and reveals his true angelic form to al-Khiḍr. Al-Khiḍr recognises him as the Archangel Gabriel, and then Gabriel bestows a spiritual title upon al-Khiḍr, by calling him Hayat Nabi, the Eternal Life Prophet.

The French scholar of Sufism, Henry Corbin, interprets al-Khiḍr as the mysterious prophet, the eternal wanderer. The function of al-Khiḍr as a 'person-archetype' is to reveal each disciple to himself, to lead each disciple to his own theophany, because that theophany corresponds to his own 'inner heaven,' to the form of his own being, to his eternal individuality. Accordingly, al-Khiḍr is Moses' spiritual guide, who initiates Moses into the divine sciences, and reveals to him the secret mystic truth. The Moroccan Sufi Abdul Aziz ad-Dabbagh describes al-Khiḍr as acting in the guidance of divine revelation (wahy) as do other saints, without requiring prophethood. In comparison to other saints, God gave al-Khiḍr the powers and the knowledge of the highest ranking saint (al-ghawth), such as the power of free disposal reaching far beyond the Arsh and having all God-sent scriptures in memory.

=== In Ahmadiyya ===
Ahmadi exegeses of the Quran tend to identify the "Servant of God" whom Moses met to be the symbolic representation of Muhammad himself. Ahmadis believe that the Quranic passage of Moses' encounter with the "Servant of God" is closely linked, contextually, to the subject matter of surah Al Kahf in which his story is cited. According to Ahmadi commentaries, Moses' journey towards, and his meeting with the "servant of God" was a visionary experience similar to the Mi'raj (ascension) of Muhammad whom Moses had desired to see and was shown in this vision. The nature of the dialogue between Moses and the "Servant of God" and the relationship between them is seen as indicative of the personal characteristics of Moses and Muhammad as well as those of their respective followers; Khiḍr's seemingly inappropriate actions and the wisdom behind them are understood with reference to salient features of Muhammad's life and teachings; and the entire Quranic narrative is understood as being expressive of Muhammad's spiritual superiority over Moses and the supersession of the Judaic dispensation by the Islamic one.

== In Druze faith ==
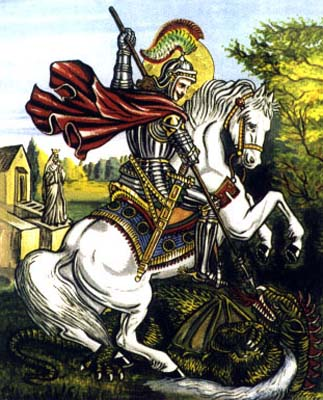
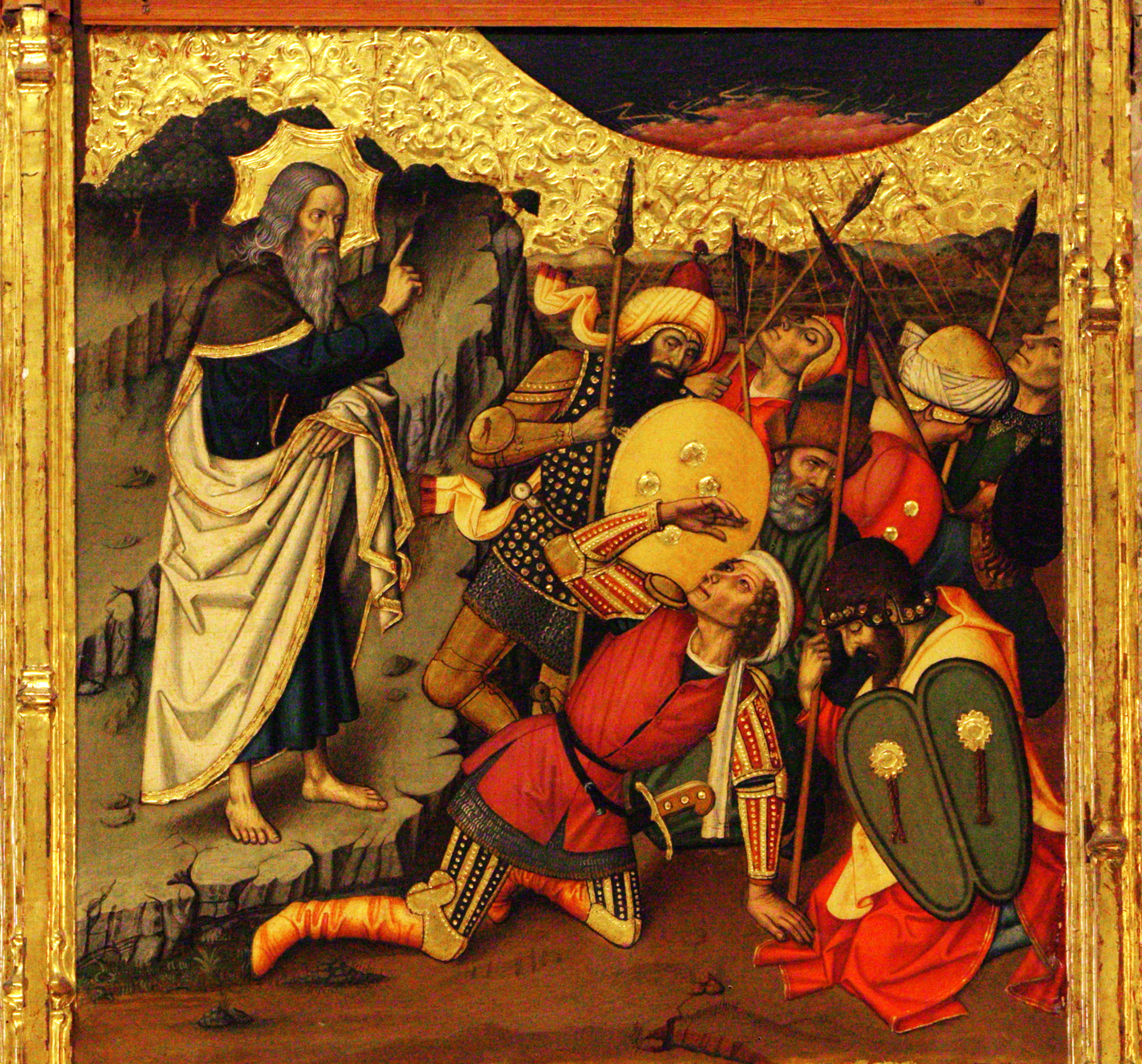
Two saints identify as "El-Khidr" in the Druze faith: Saint George (left) and Saint Elijah (right)

Druze venerate Elijah, and he is considered a central figure in Druzism. The Druze regard the Cave of Elijah as holy, and they identify Elijah as "El-Khidr", the green prophet who symbolizes water and life, a miracle who cures the sick. The Druze typically view El Khidr, John the Baptist and Saint George as one and the same, successive reincarnation of one soul, in keeping with their beliefs in these concepts.

Saint George is described as a prophetic figure in Druze sources; and in some sources he is identified with Elijah (Mar Elias), and in others as al-Khidr. The Druze version of the story of al-Khidr was syncretized with the story of Saint George and the Dragon.

Due to the Christian influence on Druze faith, two Christian saints become the Druze's favorite venerated figures: Saint George and Saint Elijah. Thus, in all the villages inhabited by Druzes and Christians in central Mount Lebanon a Christian church or Druze maqam is dedicated to either one of them. According to scholar Ray Jabre Mouawad the Druzes appreciated the two saints for their bravery: Saint George because he confronted the dragon and Saint Elijah because he competed with the pagan priests of Baal and won over them. In both cases the explanations provided by Christians is that Druzes were attracted to warrior saints that resemble their own militarized society.

The reverence for Saint George, who is often identified with Al-Khidr, is deeply integrated into various aspects of Druze culture and religious practices. He is seen as a guardian of the Druze community and a symbol of their enduring faith and resilience. Additionally, Saint George is regarded as a protector and healer in Druze tradition. The story of Saint George slaying the dragon is interpreted allegorically, representing the triumph of good over evil and the protection of the faithful from harm.

== In Zoroastrianism ==
There are many figures in Iran whose place Khidr took by the Islamization process. One of them is paradoxically a female figure, Anahita. The most popular shrine in Yazd is dedicated to Anahita. Among the Zoroastrians, for the pilgrims to Yazd, the most important of the six pir is Pir-e Sabz ("the green shrine"). The name of the shrine derives from the greenness of the foliage growing around the sanctuary. It is still a functional temple and the holiest site for present-day Zoroastrians living in Iran.

Each year from 14–18 June, many thousands of Zoroastrians from Iran, India and other countries make a pilgrimage to Yazd in Iran to worship at a hillside grotto containing the sacred spring dedicated to Pir-e Sabz. Here the worshippers pray for the fertilising rain and celebrate the greening of nature and the renewal of life.

As Babayan says, "Khizr is related to the Zoroastrian water goddess Anahita, and some of her former sanctuaries in Iran were rededicated to him (Pir-i Sabz)".

== Theories on origin ==
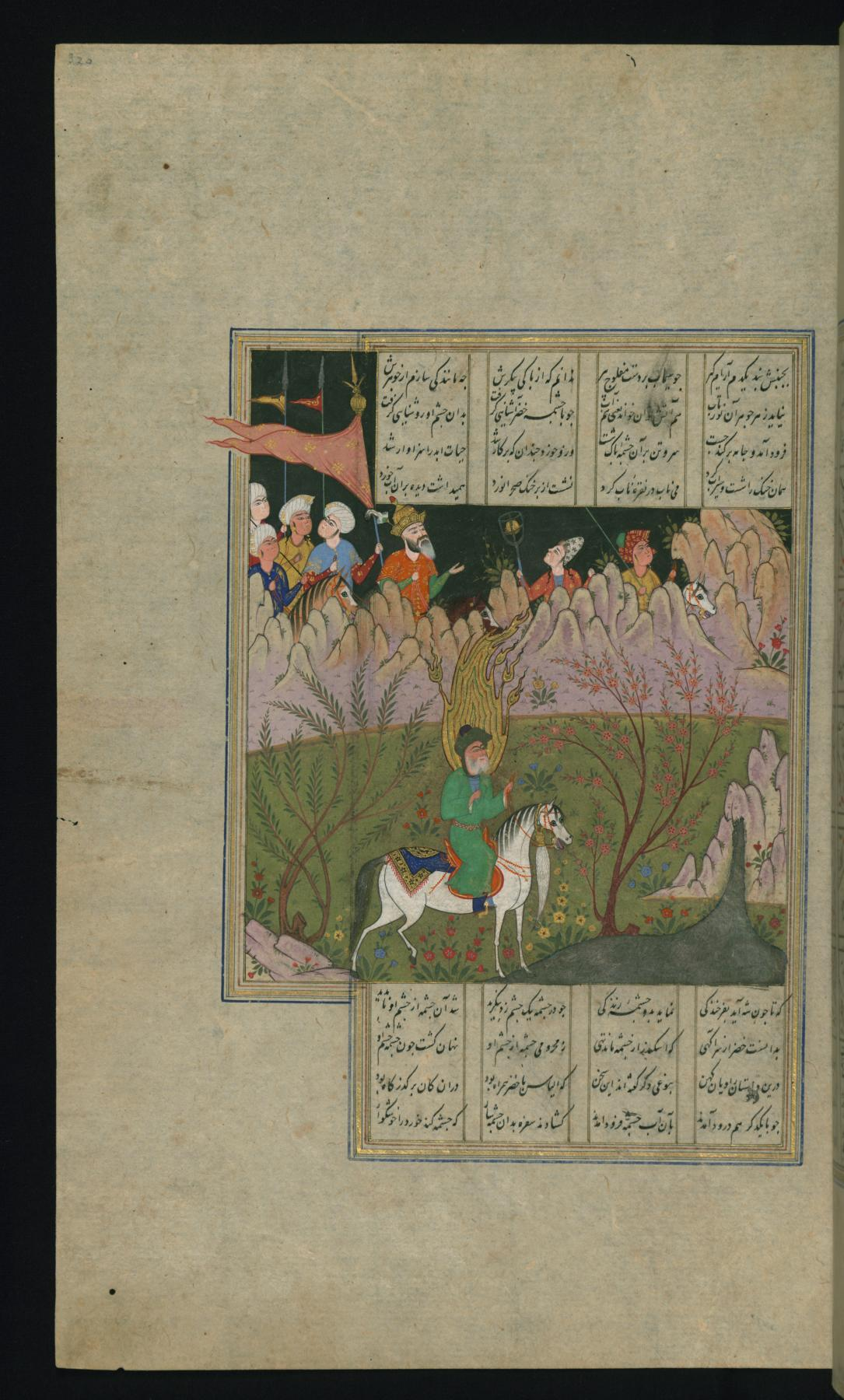
al-Khiḍr and Alexander the Great in front of the Fountain of Life

The source of the Quranic episode of Moses' journey with al-Khiḍr has been the subject of different opinions of various scholars. Like some other scholars, Brannon notes that the story does not appear to have any direct Christian or Jewish antecedent.

In one of the most influential hypotheses on the source of the al-Khiḍr story, the early twentieth-century Dutch historian Arent Jan Wensinck argued that the tale was derived from a Jewish legend involving the Talmudic Rabbi Joshua ben Levi and the Holy Prophet Elijah. As with Moses and al-Khiḍr, Joshua asks to follow Elijah, who agrees under the condition that the former not question any actions he may take. One night, Joshua and Elijah are hosted by a poor man who owns only a cow, which Elijah slaughters. The next day, they are refused hospitality by a rich man, but the Prophet fixes the man's wall without receiving pay. Finally, the two are refused hospitality by people at a rich synagogue but hosted by a group of poor people. Elijah prays to God to turn everyone in the rich synagogue into rulers, but says that only one person out of the latter should rule. When Joshua questions the Prophet, the Prophet explains that he killed the cow as a replacement for the soul of the man's wife, who was due to die that day; that he fixed the wall because there was treasure underneath it that the rich man would otherwise have found while fixing it himself; and that his prayer was because a land under a single ruler is preferable to one with multiple ones.

This Jewish legend is first attested in an Arabic work by the eleventh-century Tunisian Jewish scholar Nissim ben Jacob, some four hundred years after the composition of the Quran. Haim Schwarzbaum argued as early as in 1960 that the story appeared to be "utterly dependent upon the Koranic text", with even the language more akin to typical Classical Arabic than to other stories by Ben Jacob with clear Talmudic origins. Noting that Ben Jacob's compilation includes other stories with clear Islamic antecedents, Wheeler also suggests that the Jewish story of Elijah was created under Islamic influence, remarking that its parallels with the story of al-Khiḍr align more closely to the elaborations of later Islamic commentaries rather than the concise narrative of the Quran itself. For example, the Jewish story involves Ben Levi purposely seeking out Elijah just as God tells Moses to seek out al-Khiḍr in the Islamic commentaries, whereas the Quran itself never states whether the meeting between Moses and al-Khiḍr is intentional or accidental. A close association between Elijah and al-Khiḍr is also first attested from a number of early Islamic sources. Ben Jacob may have changed the character of the disciple from Moses to Joshua ben Levi because he was wary of attributing negative qualities to the Jewish prophet and because Ben Levi was already a familiar recurrent character in Jewish literature.

Another early story similar to the tale of Khiḍr is of Christian provenance. A damaged and non-standard thirteenth-century Greek manuscript of the Leimōn Pneumatikos, a hagiographical work by the pre-Islamic Byzantine monk John Moschus, includes the conclusion of a narrative involving an angel and a monk, in which the angel explains certain strange actions he had presumably taken in earlier, now lost sections of the narrative. The angel had stolen a cup from a generous host, because he knew that the cup was stolen and that their host would be unwittingly sinning if he continued to possess it. He had killed the son of another generous host, because he knew that the boy would grow to be a sinner if he reached adulthood but would go to heaven if he died before committing his sins. Finally, the angel had repaired the wall of a man who had refused them hospitality, because he knew that there was treasure underneath that the man would otherwise have found. The tale of the angel and the monk is part of a wider Late Antique Christian tradition of theodicy. French historian Roger Paret points out that the Moschus story is much more closely aligned to the Quranic episode than the Jewish legend; for instance, the angel in the Greek story and the "servant of God" in the Quran are both anonymous and vaguely defined, in contrast to the named figures of the Jewish Elijah or Khiḍr in Islamic exegesis. Gabriel Said Reynolds, a scholar of Islamic theology, has regarded the Moschus tale as the likely source of the Quranic narrative.

Schwarzbaum has argued that the Quranic narrative originated in a Late Antique context in which Christian theodicy legends involving monks were popular, with being the equivalent of the Christian pneumatic with knowledge derived directly from the Divine." Schwarzbaum also speculated of an ultimately Jewish prototype for Khiḍr, possibly a legend involving Moses becoming a disciple of the future Rabbi Akiva, compiler of the Oral Torah. While agreeing that the Quranic story "combines disparate elements from motifs current in late antiquity", Wheeler rejects Schwarzbaum's connection between Rabbi Akiva and Khiḍr.

In the Quranic narrative which immediately precedes Moses's encounter with Khiḍr, a fish that Moses and his servant had intended to eat escapes into the sea, and the prophet encounters Khiḍr when he returns to the place where the fish escaped. The episode of the fish is generally thought to derive from an episode in the Alexander Romance of Late Antiquity in which Alexander's cook discovers the Fountain of Life while washing a dead fish in it, which then comes to life and escapes. The Alexander Romance is partly derived from the ancient Epic of Gilgamesh, which means that the Quranic narrative is ultimately related to the story of Gilgamesh.

Another hypothesis on the origin of Khiḍr compares him to the Ugaritic god Kothar-wa-Khasis. Both characters have some surprisingly common features. For example, Kothar and Khidr possess wisdom and secret knowledge. Both figures are involved in the slaying of a dragon. Kothar helps Baal to kill Yam-Nahar by making weapons for him. Khidr helps Sufis or wali's like Sarı Saltık in their struggle with a dragon. Both are also known as "sailor" figures who are symbolically associated with sea, lake and rivers. Khidr often has some characteristics of a sailor, even in cultural areas which are not directly linked to the sea, like mountainous Dersim. However, the scholar who made this argument recently (2019) revised it. While the two figures share characteristic parallels in many ways, historical analysis has shown that it is misleading to consider only this symbolic harmony. According to this view, although Khidr has some common features arising from the mythological personality of Eliyah transferred from Kothar and Hasis, he is in fact a syncretic form of Enoch and Eliyah. Because the Quranic story about Khidr who is mentioned anonymously in the surat al-Kahf, is basically the Enochian version of an Eliyah story.

== Comparative mythology ==
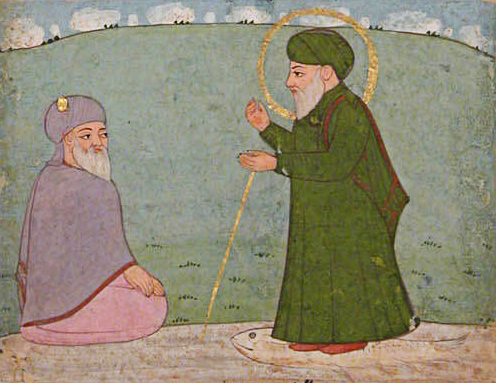
18th-century Islamic illustration of Iskander (left) talking to the Islamic prophet al-Khidr, who stands on a fish

In various accounts al-Khidr has been linked to the figure of Dhu al-Qarnayn, who is commonly identified as Alexander the Great, although many Islamic scholars have rejected this claim as Alexander the Great was a polytheist. In one version, al-Khidr and Dhu al-Qarnayn cross the Land of Darkness to find the Water of Life. Dhu al-Qarnayn gets lost looking for the spring but al-Khidr finds it and gains eternal life. According to Wahb ibn Munabbih, quoted by Ibn Hisham, King Sa'b was given the epithet Dhu al-Qarnayn by al-Khidr after meeting him in Jerusalem. There are also several versions of the Alexander Romance in which al-Khidr figures as a servant of Alexander the Great. In the Eskandarnāma by an anonymous author, al-Khidr is asked by Dhu al-Qarnayn to lead him and his armies to the Water of Life. Al-Khidr agrees, and eventually stumbles upon the Water of Life on his own. Khidr's role is expanded in the 13th-century Sirat al-Iskandar, where he is Alexander's companion throughout.

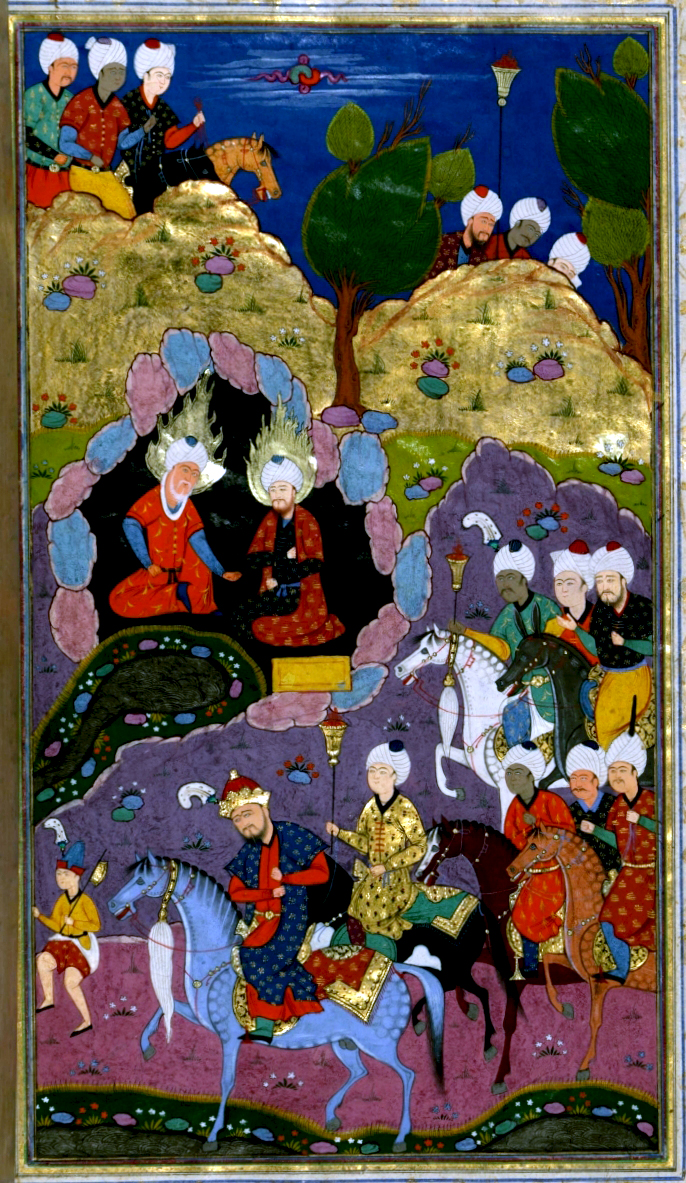
Iskander visits Fountain of Youth with Khidr and Ilyas.

Some scholars suggest that al-Khidr is also represented in the Arthurian tale Sir Gawain and the Green Knight as the Green Knight. In the story, the Green Knight tempts the faith of Sir Gawain three times. The character of al-Khidr may have come into European literature through the mixing of cultures during the Crusades. It is also possible that the story derives from an Irish myth which predates the Crusades in which Cú Chulainn and two other heroes compete for the curadmír, the select portion given to champions, at feasts; ultimately, Cú Chulainn is the only one willing to let a giant – actually a king who has magically disguised himself – cut off his head, as per their agreement.

In certain parts of India, al-Khidr is also known as Khawaja Khidr, a river spirit of wells and streams. He is mentioned in the Sikandar-nama as the saint who presides over the well of immortality, and is revered by both Hindus and Muslims. He is sometimes pictured as an old man dressed in green, and is believed to ride upon a fish. His principal shrine is on an island of the Indus River by Bhakkar in Punjab, Pakistan.

In Iraq, a cultural holiday known as Eid Khidr Elias is celebrated by Iraqi Arabs, Yazidis, and Turkmens. In Baghdad, there's a shrine claimed to belong to al-Khidr where Iraqi social gatherings for the holiday materialize.

In The Unreasoning Mask by famed science fiction writer Philip José Farmer, while Ramstan, captain of the al-Buraq, a rare model spaceship capable of instantaneous travel between two points, attempts to stop an unidentified creature that is annihilating intelligent life on planets throughout the universe, he is haunted by repeating vision of meeting al-Khidr.

In later Islamic and Sufi traditions, al-Khidr is often portrayed as a continuing spiritual presence who guides and assists people in different places and circumstances. He is closely associated with growth, blessing, and vegetation, and some accounts state that the ground became green wherever he sat or prayed. These traditions helped give rise to his title "al-Khidr" (“the Green One”).

== See also ==
- Hıdırellez
- Green Man
- Mysticism
- Mahis
- Saint George
- Pir Khidir Zinda, a mausoleum, believed to house Khidir's remains

== Bibliography ==
- Paret, Roger (1968). "Un parallèle byzantin à Coran, XVIII, 59–81". Revue des études byzantines (in French). 26: 137–159. doi:10.3406/rebyz.1968.1402.
- Reynolds, Gabriel Said (2018). The Qurʾān and the Bible: Text and Commentary. Yale University Press. ISBN 978-0-300-18132-6.
- Schwarzbaum, Haim (1960). "The Jewish and Moslem Versions of Some Theodicy Legends. (Aa-Th. 759)". Fabula. 3 (1): 119–169. doi:10.1515/fabl.1960.3.1.119. S2CID 163130890.
- Michelangelo Chasseur: Oriental Elements in Surat al Kahf. Annali di Scienze Religiose 1, Brepols Publishers 2008, ISSN 2031-5929, p. 255-289 (Brepols Journals Online)
- Oliver Leaman: The Qur'an: An Encyclopedia. Taylor & Francis 2006, ISBN 0-415-32639-7, p. 343–345 (, p. 343, at Google Books)
- Wheeler, Brannon M. (1998a). "The Jewish Origins of Qurʾān 18:65–82? Reexamining Arent Jan Wensinck's Theory". Journal of the American Oriental Society. 118 (2): 153–171. doi:10.2307/605888. JSTOR 605888.
- ———— (2002). Moses in the Quran and Islamic Exegesis. Routledge. ISBN 0-7007-1603-3.
