= Martyrius =

Martyrius is the name of:

- Martyrius of Antioch, Patriarch of Antioch from 460 to 470
- Martyrius (archbishop of Esztergom) (r. 1151–1158)
- Martyrius of Jerusalem, Patriarch of Jerusalem from 478 to 486
- Sisinnius, Martyrius and Alexander, martyrs
- Sahdona, 7th century Syrian theologian also known as Martyrius
- Saint Martiros, 4th-century Syrian martyr venerated in Armenia
