= Saint Sarkis Monastery of Ushi =

Armenian monumental ruined monastery

Saint Sarkis Monastery Սուրբ Սարգիս Վանք
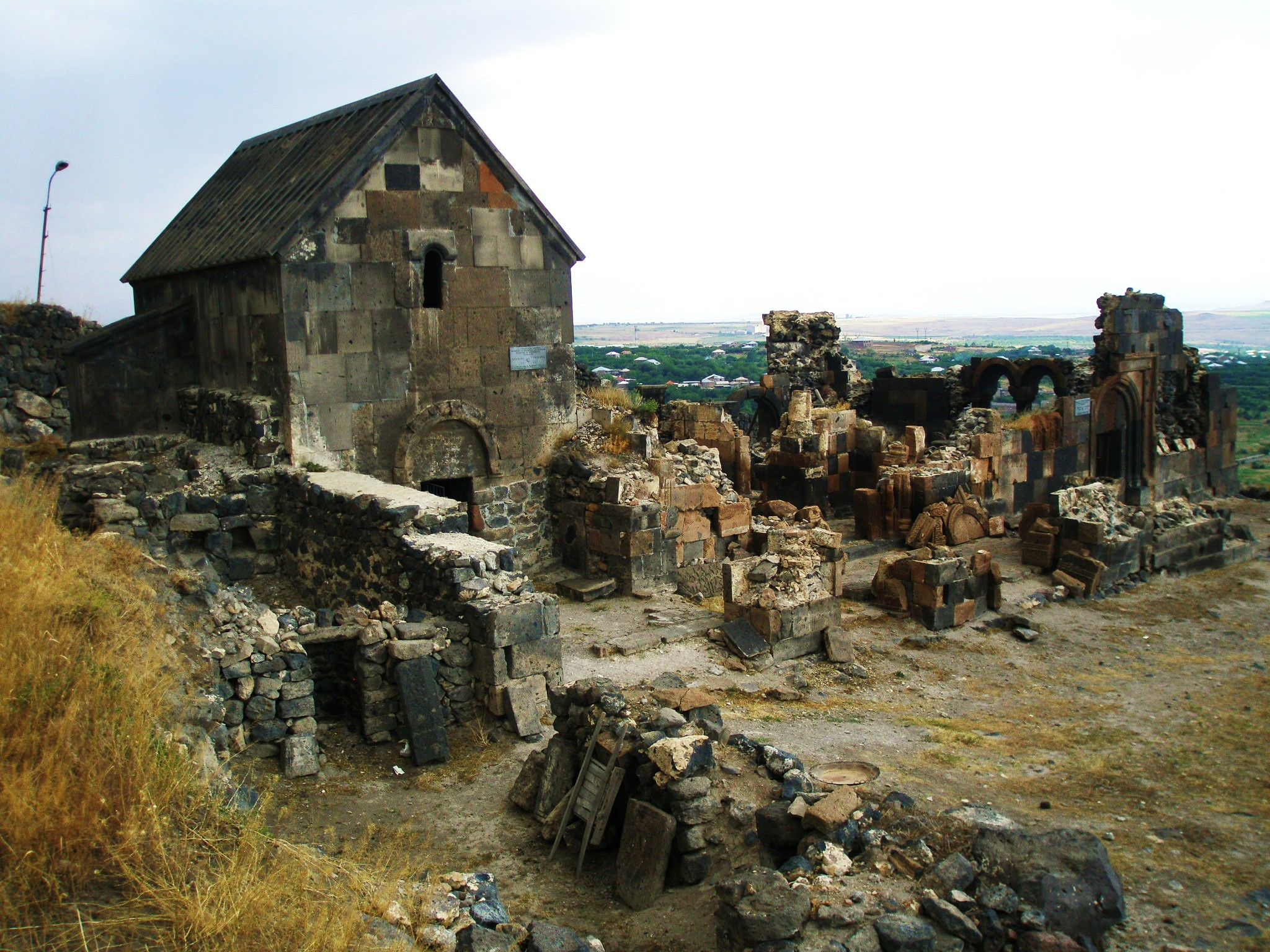
- Ruins of the Saint Sarkis monastic complex at Ushi

- Location within Armenia Location within Aragatsotn

Religion
- Affiliation: Armenian Apostolic Church

Location
- Location: Ushi village, Aragatsotn Province, Armenia
- Coordinates: 40.347584°N 44.360089°E

Architecture
- Style: Armenian
- Completed: 7th-13th centuries

Saint Sarkis Monastery (Armenian: Սուրբ Սարգիս Վանք or Ուշի Վանք; also Surp Sarkis Vank) is a large monastic complex, 45 by 54 metres (148 by 177 ft) just outside the village of Ushi in the Aragatsotn Province of Armenia. It sits at the far side of what was once a settlement site from the 3rd - 1st millennia BC. The monastery is a well known pilgrimage site, and was one of the centers of spiritual education in Armenia. Many fine examples of early Armenian architecture from various periods can be seen around the complex.

The monastery is known to have had a brief visit during September 1734 by Abraham Kretatsi during the time while he was serving the Catholicos Abraham II while on his pilgrimage to a number of monasteries at the Catholicos' request. The Catholicos had said to him, "I have not traveled anywhere for a long time and my heart is very heavy." In Kretratsi's writings he says that:

"Two or three days after savoring this spiritual and corporal happiness, we went to the church of Saint Sarkis in Ushi. While we were there, Hakobyan, the melik of Yerevan, who had been summoned at the Catholicos, arrived. A horseman arrived from Tbilisi the same day. He brought the news, as well as an official letter to inform us, that Isak Pasha, has, without any reason, had ordered the strangling of Ashichal Bek, the melik of our people the Armenians in Tbilisi. He had kept his corpse hanging on the city gate until he received 50,000 kurush which he had permitted he body to be buried."

== History and architecture ==
The Monastery of Saint Sarkis consists of Saint Sarkis Chapel of the 10th century, Surp Astvatsatsin Church ("Church of the Holy Mother of God"), an adjacent gavit of the 11th-12th centuries, vestibule, belfry, refectory, vaulted guest-chamber, housing for monks, and utility rooms. A fortification wall built in 1654 with fortified two-storey circular towers in three of the corners surrounds the monastic complex. During the earthquakes of 1679 and 1827, the monastery was reduced to ruins. The only structure left standing was the single-nave vaulted chapel that houses the grave of Saint Sarkis. He was originally buried in the village town of Namyan, but in the 5th century a delegation led by Saint Mesrop moved the remains of Saint Sarkis and interred them at this site. The chapel was damaged and left in poor condition due to the earthquakes, and shows some signs of emergency repairs.

Restoration work was done on the chapel in December 2003 to spring of 2004, and recent archaeological excavations have started to take place under the patronage of Archbishop Shahen Ajemian headed by Frina Babayan. Archaeologists have cleared the collapsed structures and are currently (as of Aug. 2009) working to piece together parts of the collapsed church and gavit.

Upon the hill nearby, there are the remains of an Iron Age fortress. It is almost nonexistent except for portions of the collapsed walls that once surrounded the fortress. Nearby down the main road that leads back into Ushi from the monastery, is a small chapel from the 10th century.

== Gallery ==
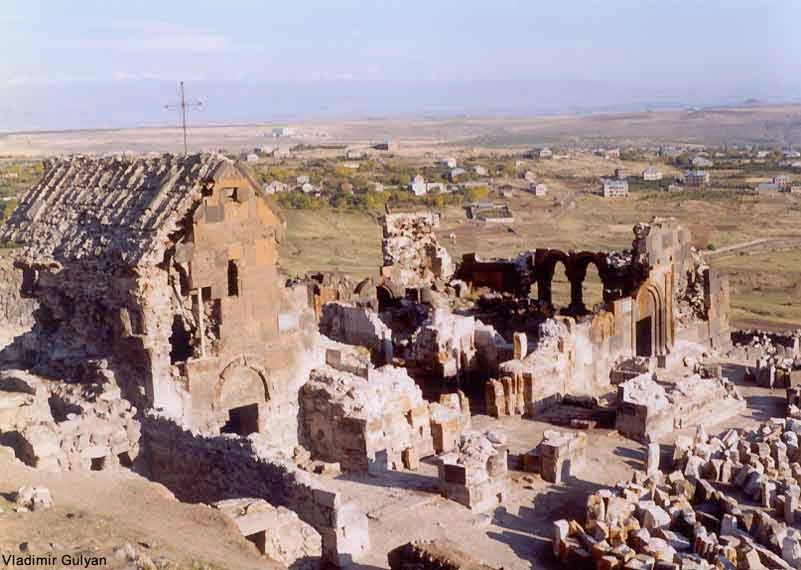
Saint Sarkis Church prior to restoration work done in 2003-2004

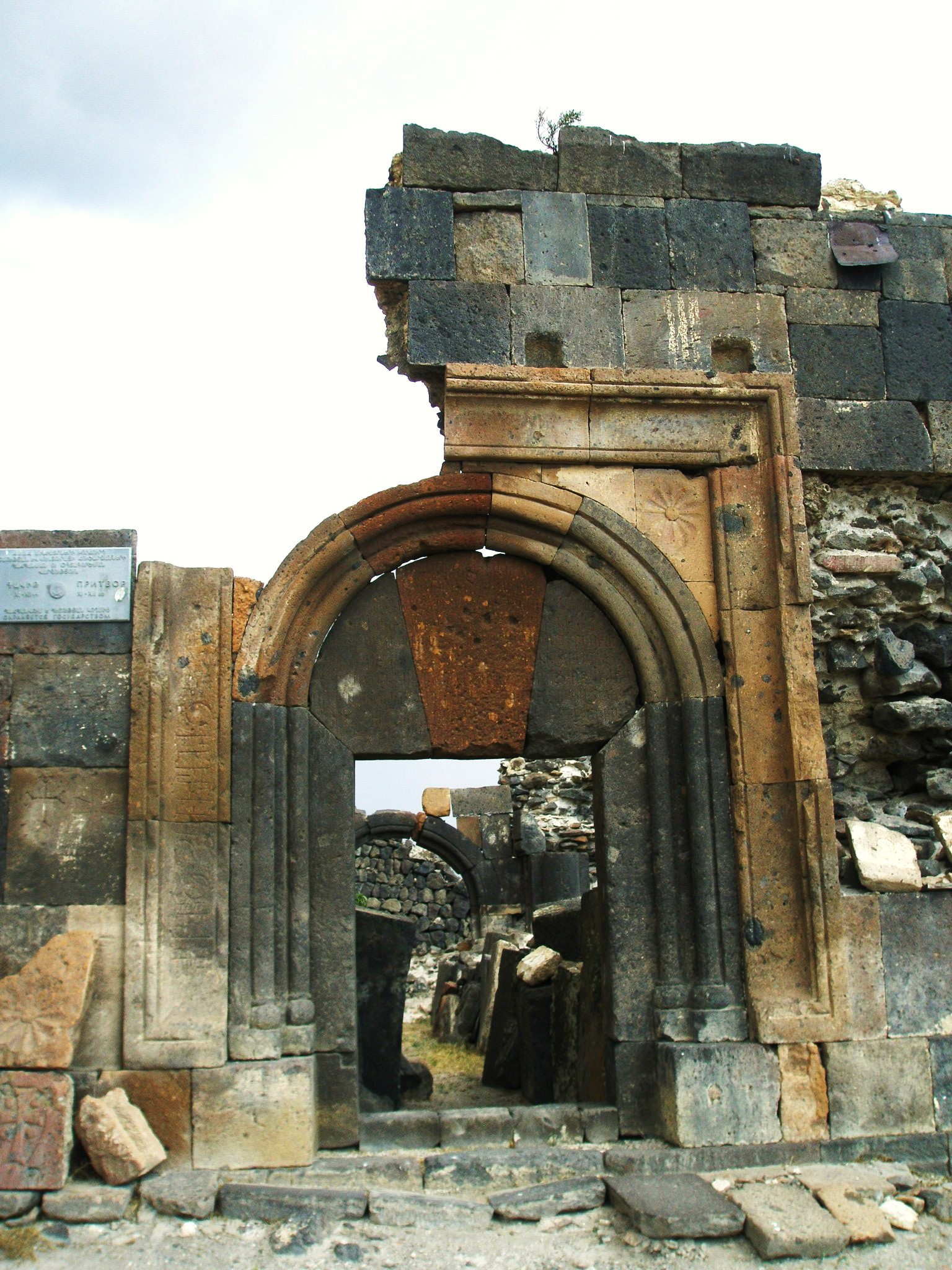
Main portal leading to the gavit adjacent to S. Astvatsatsin Church within the monaster

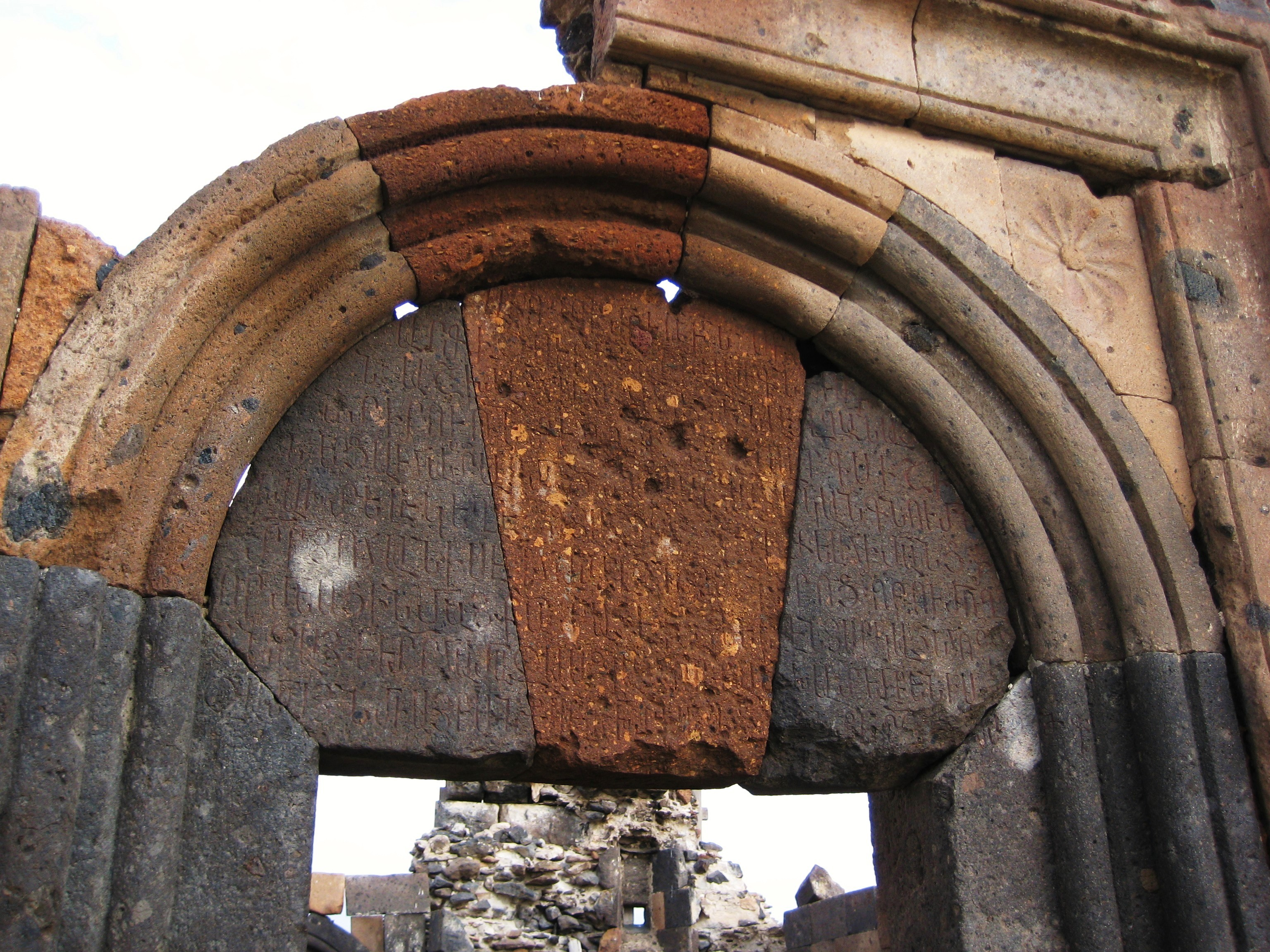
Detail of the inscription upon the lintel above the portal leading to the gavit

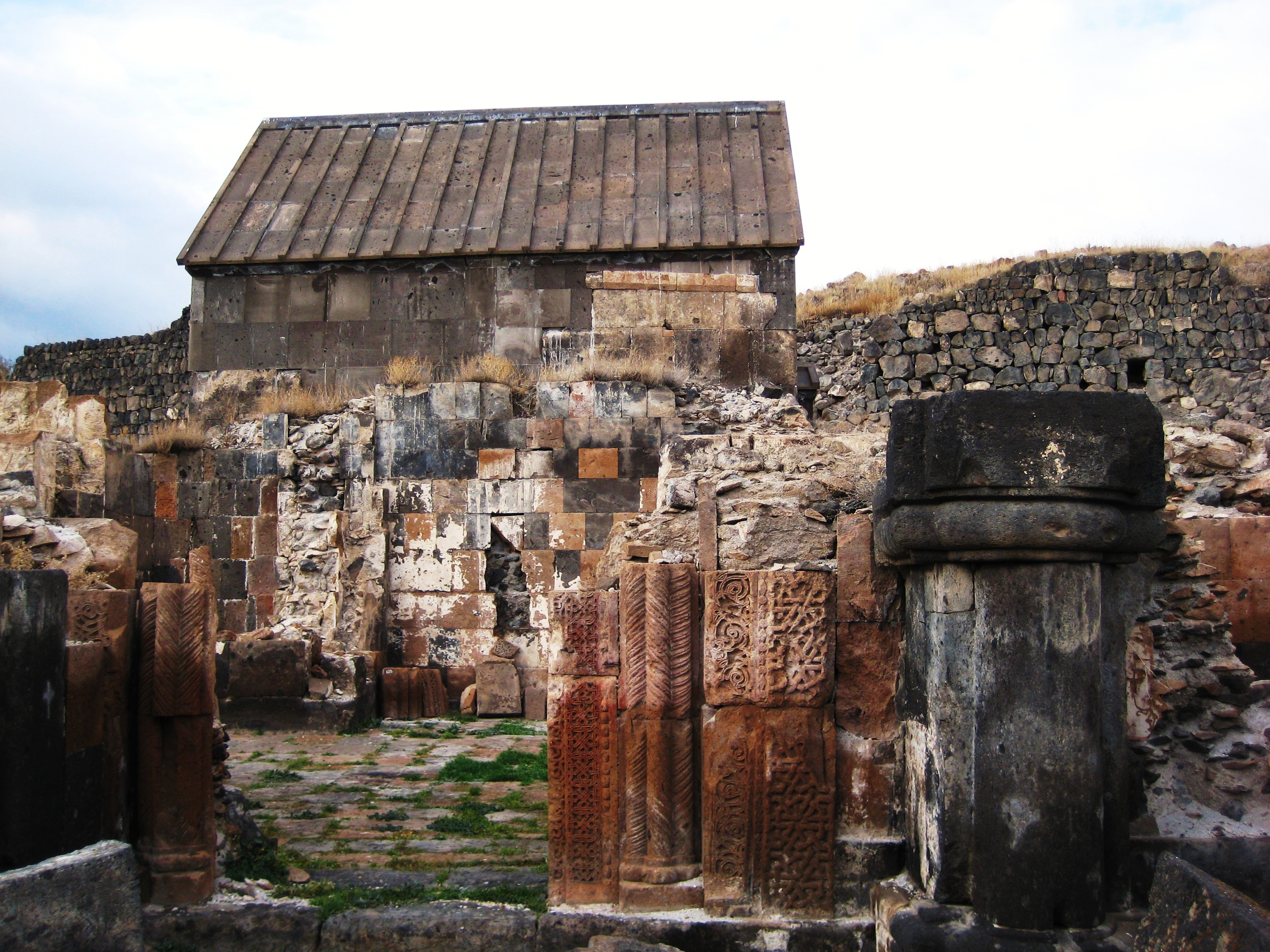
Details around the portal leading from the gavit adjacent to Surp Astvatsatsin Church

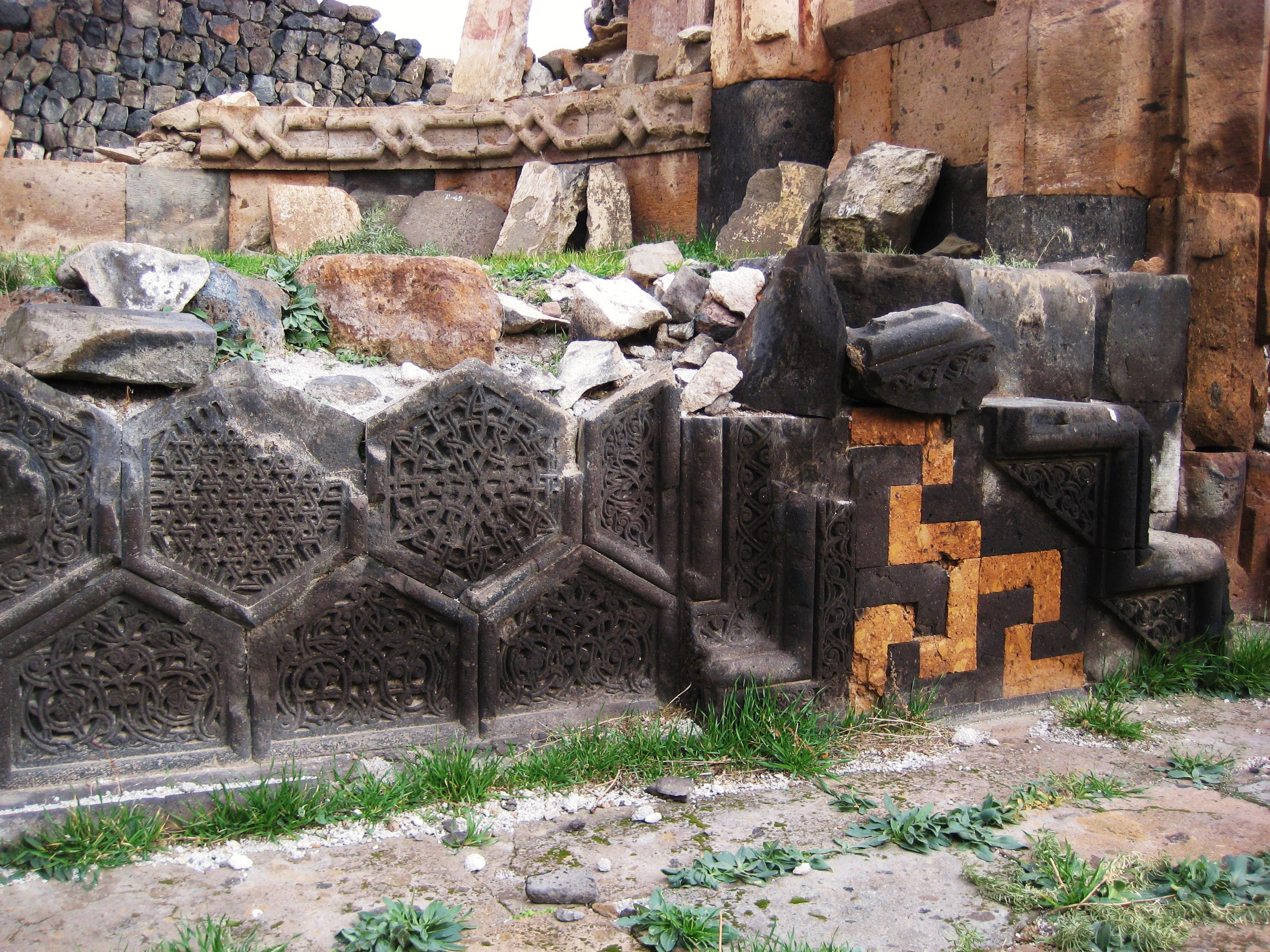
Hexagonal pattern detail on the apse of S. Astvatsatsin

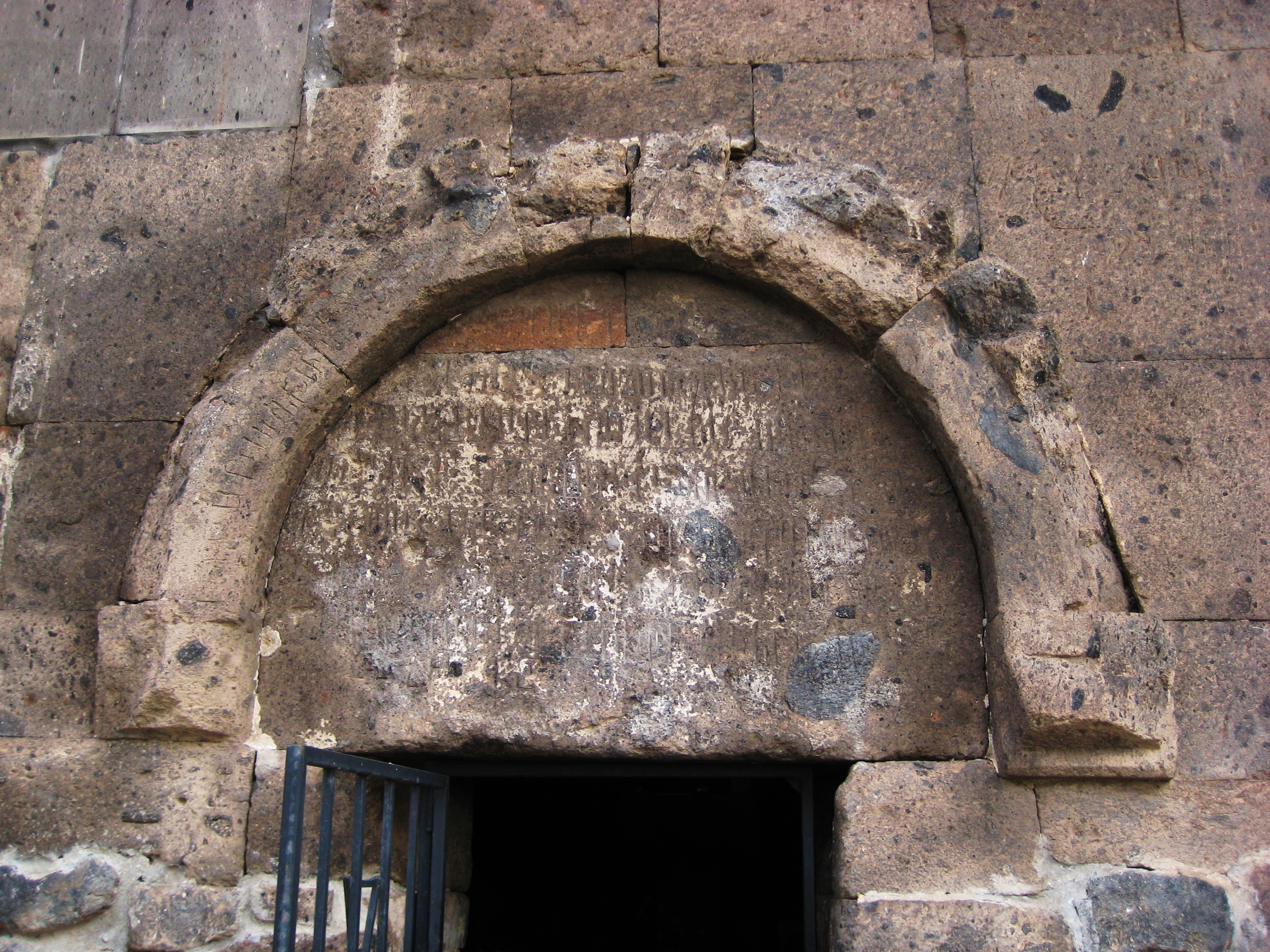
Lintel with a worn inscription above the door to Saint Sarkis Chapel

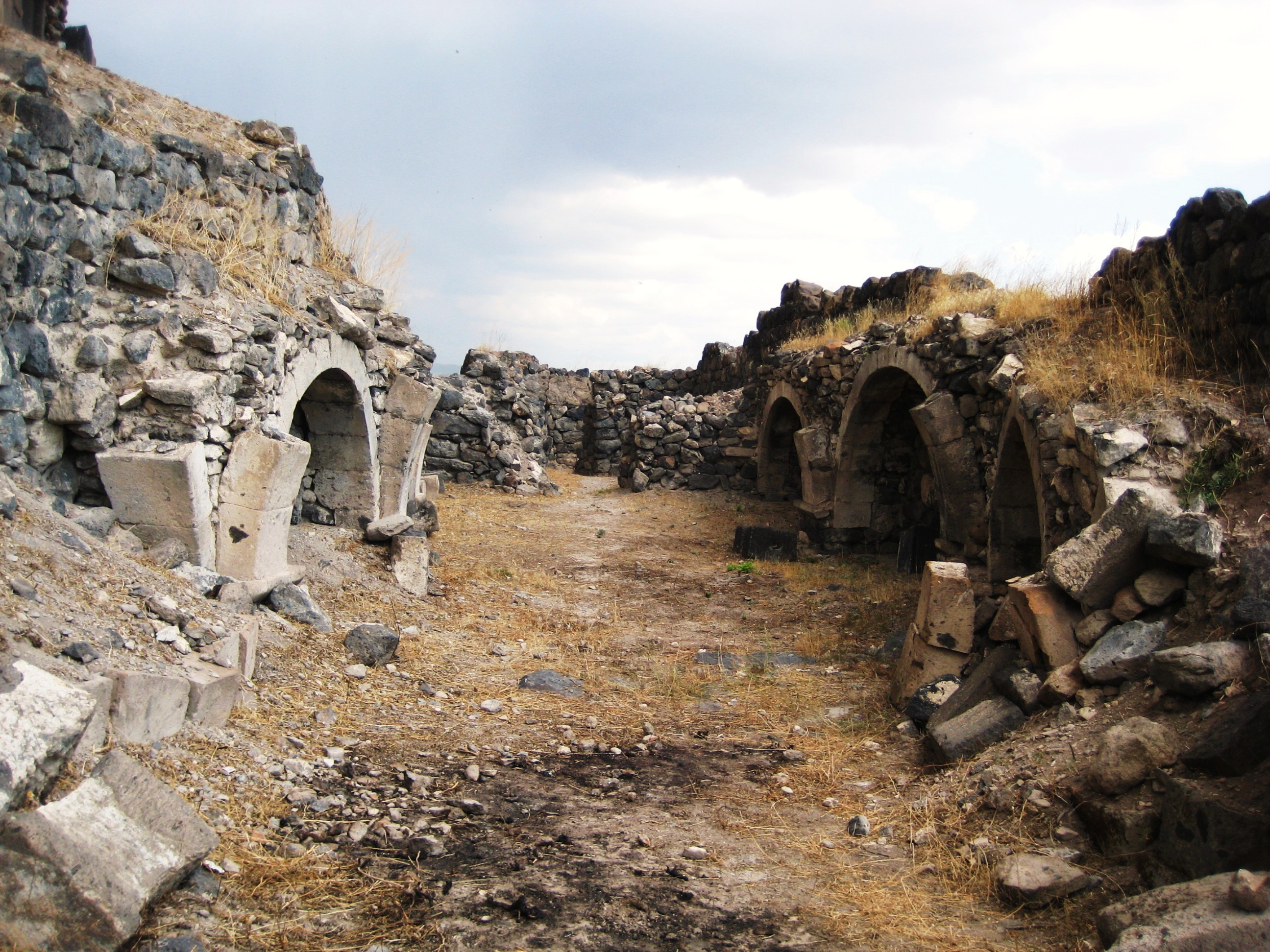
Ruins of an arched structure at the base of the monastic complex

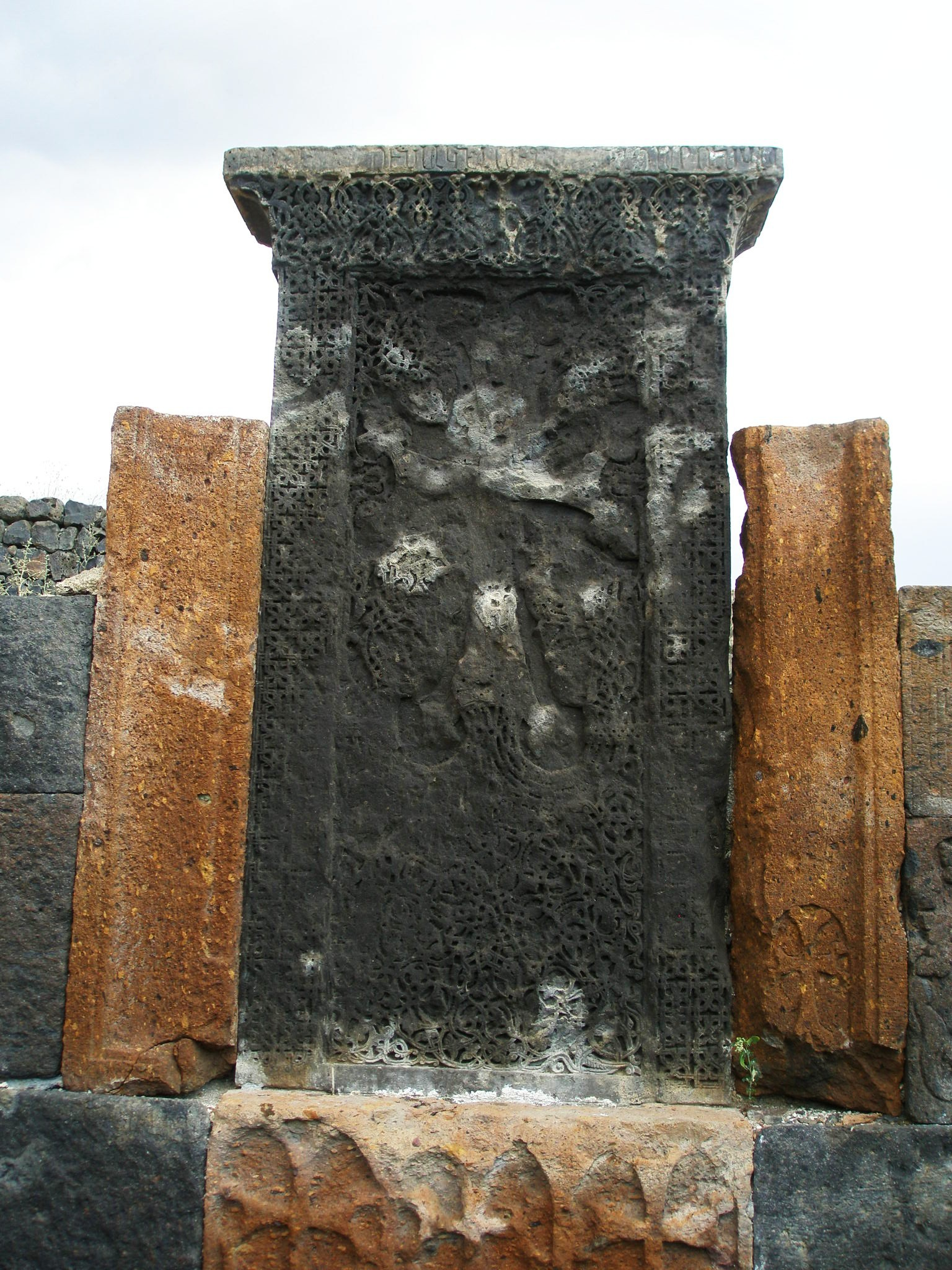
Khachkar standing near Surp Astvatsatsin Church

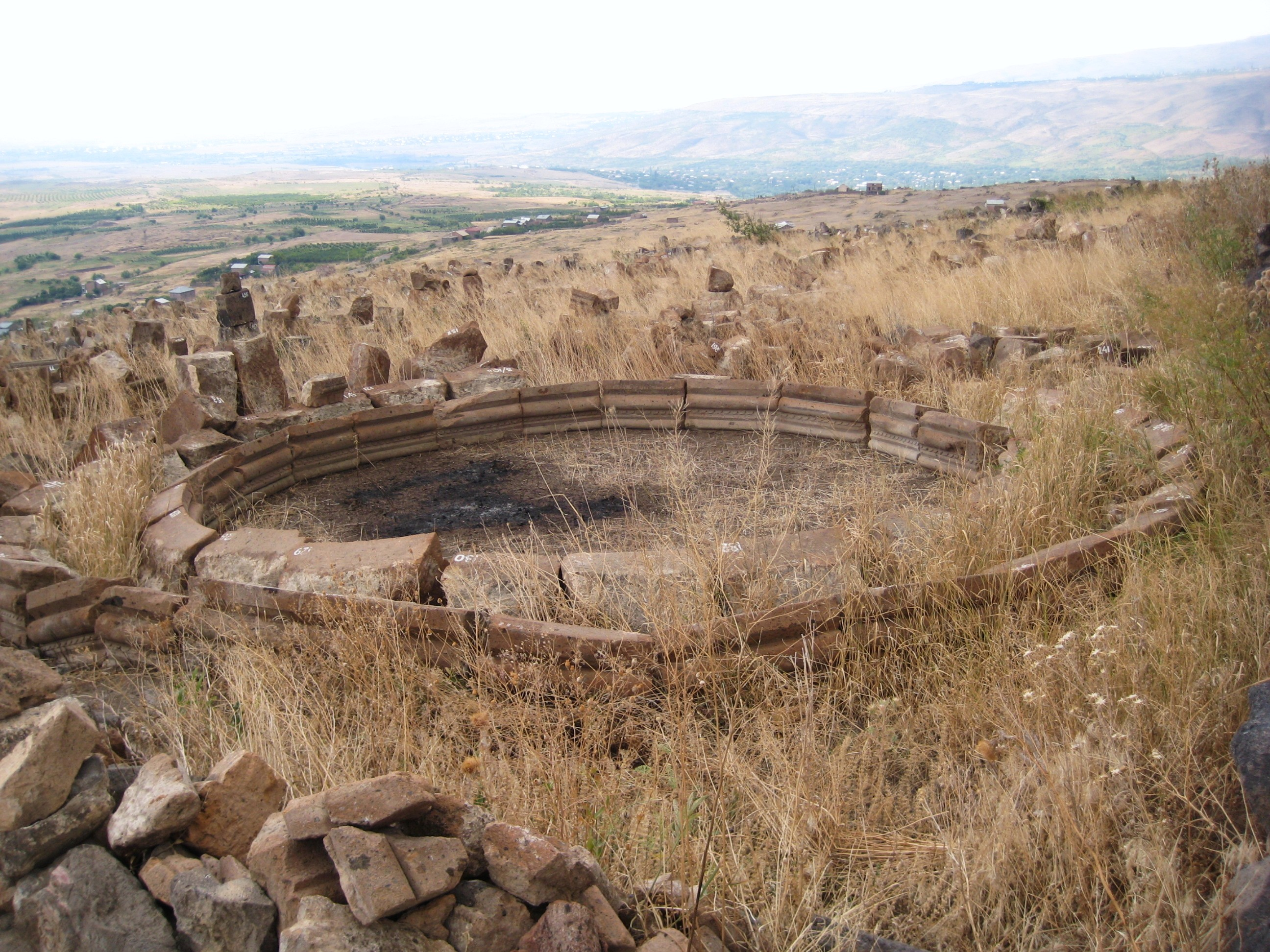
Archaeological work being done to understand the architecture of the fallen church

== See also ==
- Saint Sarkis the Warrior
