= Ushiberd =

Armenian fortress

Ushiberd Ուշիբերդ
- Aragatsotn Province, Armenia
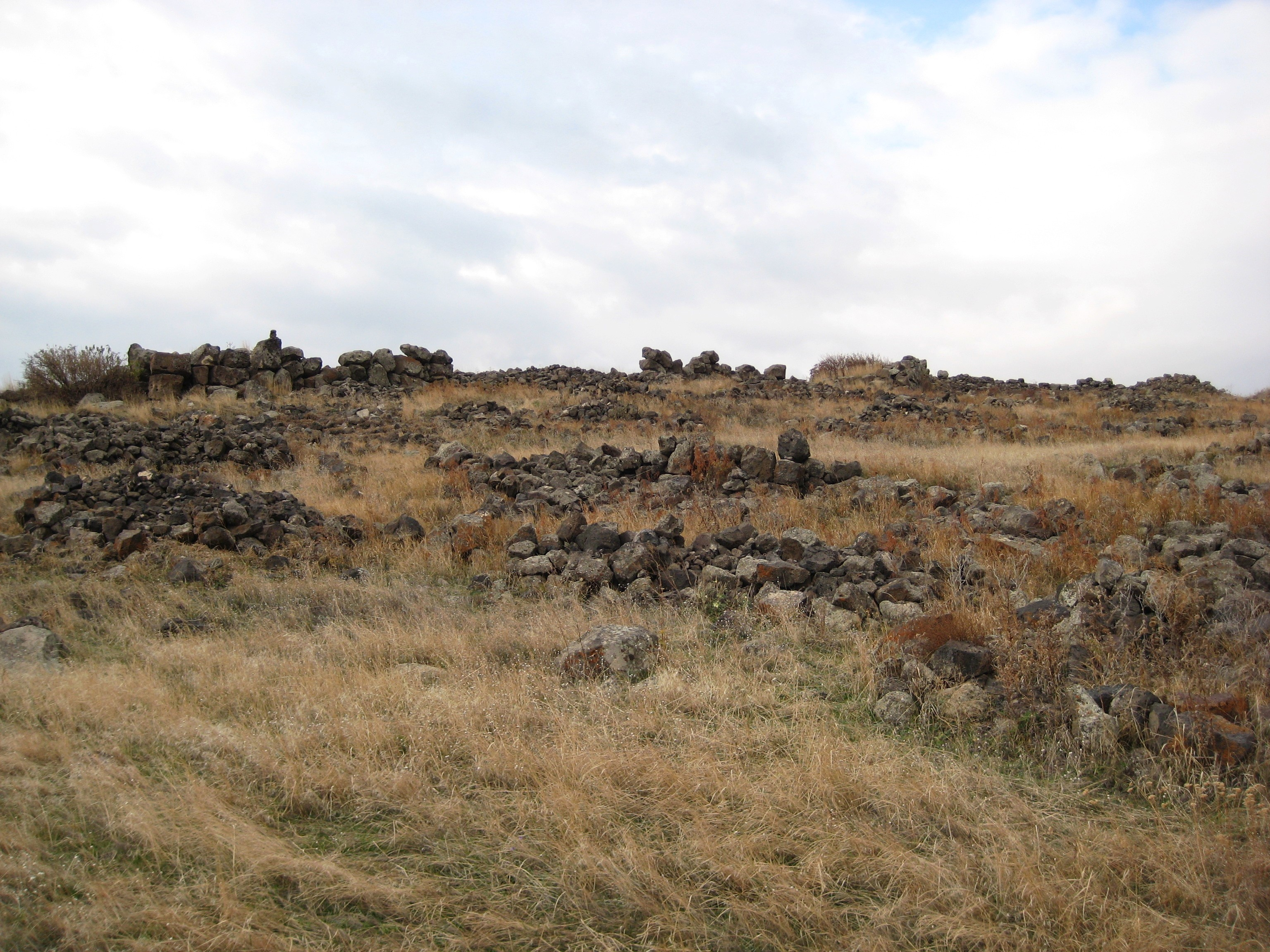
- Some of the few remaining walls of Ushiberd

Site information
- Type: Fortress
- Open to the public: Yes
- Condition: Ruins (rubble with some partially standing wall segments)

Location
- Shown within Armenia
- Coordinates: 40.3475°N 44.3601°E

Site history
- In use: Site: ancient settlement from the 3rd–1st millennia BC; Fortress: built during the Iron Age

Ushiberd (Armenian: Ուշիբերդ) is an Iron Age fortress located upon a hill just outside the village of Ushi in the Aragatsotn Province of Armenia. It has almost completely collapsed except for portions of the walls that once surrounded the fortress, located around the edge of the hill before it descends. Within the area that was once the interior of the fortress are large piles of large stones that once made up the fortification walls and structures within. Just below the hill is Saint Sargis Monastery of the 7th–13th centuries. It sits at the far side of what was once a settlement site from the 3rd–1st millennia BC. Nearby, down the main road that leads back into Ushi from the monastery and fortress, is a small chapel from the 10th century.

== Gallery ==
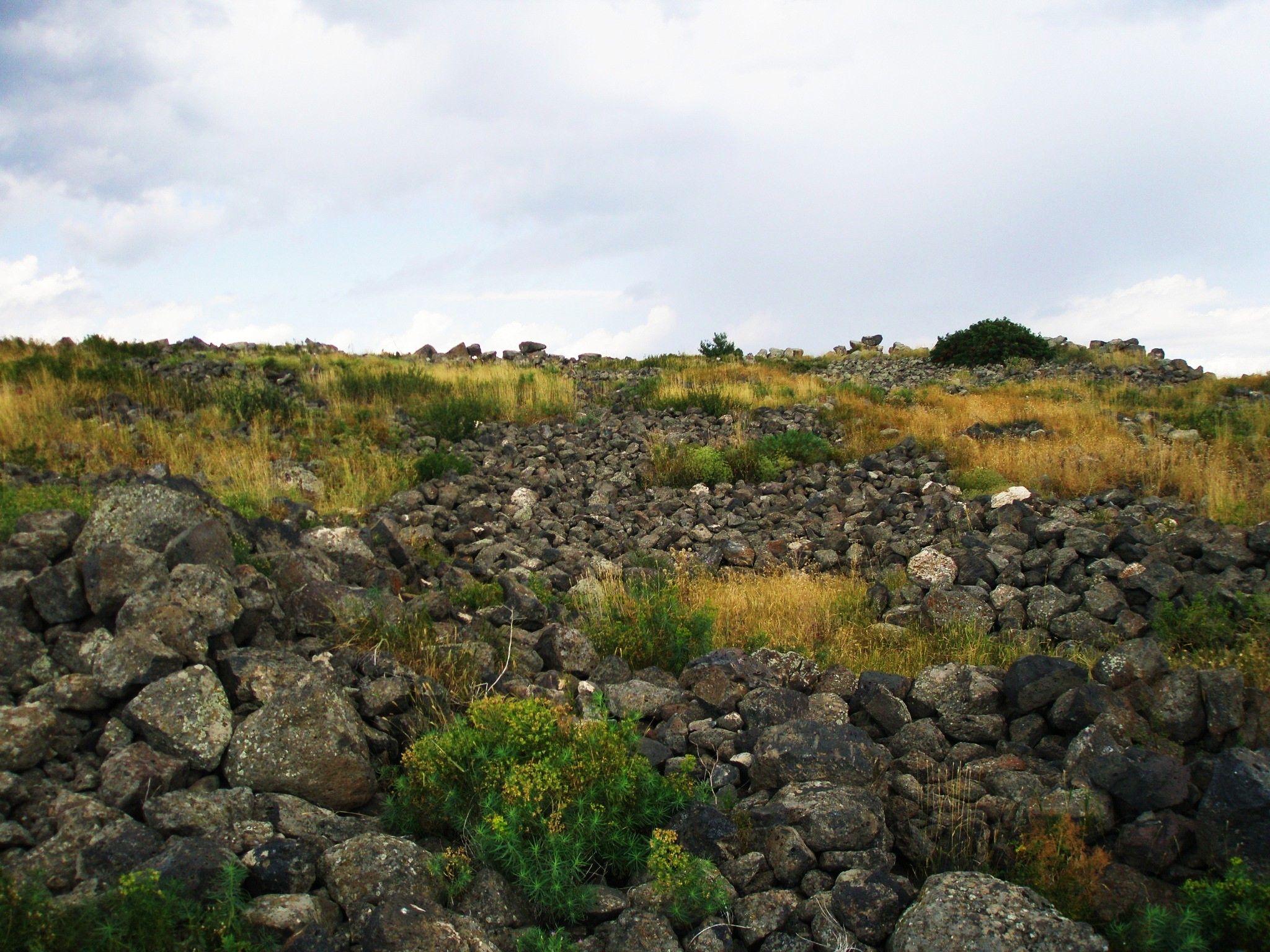
Thick piles of stones where fortifications had once been at the top of the hill.
