= Muhammad Sa'id al-Suwaidi =

Iraqi Muslim polymath (1728 - 1808)

Personal life
- Born: 1728 Karkh, Baghdad
- Died: 1808 (aged 79–80) Karkh, Baghdad
- Resting place: Sheikh Ma'ruf Cemetery
- Main interest(s): Interpreting of the Hadith, the Arabic language, and Arabic poetry

Religious life
- Religion: Islam
- Tariqa: Naqshbandi

Sheikh Muhammad Sa'id al-Suwaidi (Arabic: محمد سعيد السويدي, 1728 - 1808) was an Iraqi Islamic scholar, poet, and mosque Imam from the Ottoman Empire. He was a member and a leader of the Sufi Naqshbandi Order in Baghdad, Ottoman Iraq.

== Biography ==
Muhammad Sa'id al-Suwaidi was born in Karkh, Baghdad, in 1728 to the Iraqi al-Suwadi family, which was famous for its knowledge, jurisprudence, and literature. His father, the Sheikh Abdullah bin Hussein al-Suwadi, was the author of many books, including the book “Al-Nafha al-Miskiyya” on the Meccan journey. He studied under his father, as well as other scholars such as Sheikh Abd al-Qadir al-Makki al-Harithi, and Sheikh Ali al-Ansari, and studied some grammar under Sheikh Ibrahim bin Sultan al-Jabouri. Growing up, he learned from many Islamic scholars in Baghdad, and would temporarily visit Cairo's madrasas.

His house was in Karkh, which he was reportedly attached to, was a significant landmark in Baghdad at the time which would be later inherited by his son, Muhammad Amin. It was described as having two floors, an upper and a lower one. His aforementioned son used the upper floor overlooking the road as a majlis where he would sit and teach. When its structure weakened, he renovated it, which became known as al-Suwaidi Madrasa. It remained one of the famous schools in Karkh until the death of Muhammad Amin in 1830. Some significant accounts state that the madrasa was its own building located in what is today the Khidr Elias Shrine. Established both by Muhammad Amin and Mamluk Dawud Pasha as a madrasa on the banks of the Tigris.

== Death ==
Sources that dealt with the biography of Sheikh al-Suwaidi differed regarding the date of his death. Al-Misk al-Athfar states that he died around 1203 Hijri, which is not consistent with the date of the authorisation documented above. Hadiyyat al-Arifeen states that he died in 1213 AH - 1798 AD. An article by Professor Kadhim al-Dujaili published in the magazine Lughat al-Arab mentions his authorization from Murtada al-Zabidi, where al-Zubaidi writes in his own handwriting:

“In it, I have authorized him (al-Suwaidi) to write all my works, such as Sharh al-Qamus and Ihya’ and others, large and small, important and insignificant, so let the people of knowledge and literature who are familiar with it trust it... He wrote this quickly on the afternoon of Monday, the third of Muharram, 1204 AH - 1789 AD.”

The author of the article then states that he died in 1808, and was buried in the Sheikh Ma'ruf Cemetery. This date is the most likely and reliable, as the author of the article obtained his information, including this date of death, from al-Suwaidi's own family.
