= Atta Mosque =

Historical mosque in Baghdad, Iraq

- جامع عطا

Religion
- Affiliation: Islam
- Ecclesiastical or organisational status: Active

Location
- Location: Baghdad, Iraq

Architecture
- Founder: Atta family
- Dome: 1

The Atta Mosque (Arabic: جامع عطا) is an old historical mosque located in Karkh in Baghdad, Iraq.

== History ==
The mosque was built in the 17th century by the House of Atta, an influential, wealthy trading family notable for their trade work across Iraq, the Levant, the Hejaz, and Egypt at the time. Although the family eventually settled in Egypt, members of the family also held a majlis in the area and had teachers from the Qadiriyya and al-Khilani Mosque. The mosque's construction was part of charity work the family conducted and became well-known for, especially the construction of the Atta Mosque, which the family became famous for at the time.

Furthermore, the neighborhood in which the mosque is located and is most frequented by, became known as the "Atta Mosque locality", and is still referred to by the locals of al-Karkh. The mosque's architecture is fairly modest, having a small prayer space that leads to the qibla. It has a courtyard but no minaret.

== See also ==
- Islam in Iraq
- List of mosques in Baghdad
- Shabandar Mosque, another notable mosque in Baghdad also built by a notable merchant family.
