= Ushi, Armenia =

Village in Aragatsotn, Armenia

Ushi Ուշի
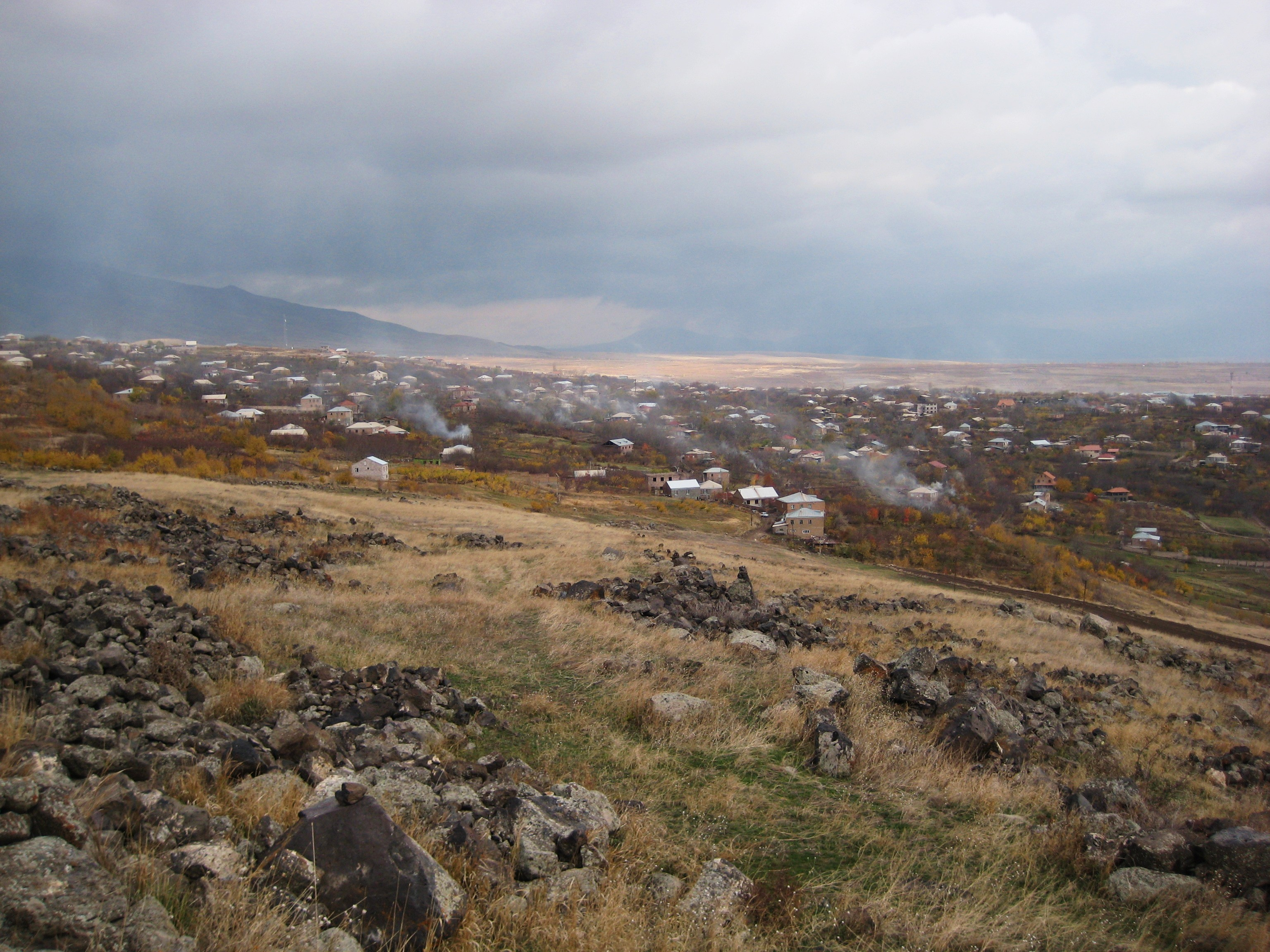
- The village of Ushi. Smoke rises as villagers burn dead plant material during the fall season.

- Location within Armenia Location within Aragatsotn
- Coordinates: 40°20′54″N 44°22′23″E
- Country: Armenia
- Province: Aragatsotn
- Municipality: Ashtarak
- Elevation: 1,400 m (4,600 ft)

Population (2011)
  - Total: 1,617
- Time zone: UTC+4
  - Summer (DST): UTC+5

Ushi (Armenian: Ուշի) is a village in the Ashtarak Municipality of the Aragatsotn Province of Armenia. It contains a 10th-century chapel, and approximately 1 km outside the village are the ruins of Saint Sargis Monastery of the 7th to 13th centuries. Under the Chapel of Saint Sargis (the only structure still standing), is the grave and re-interred remains of the aforementioned saint. On top of the hill adjacent to the monastery complex are the collapsed remains of an Iron Age fortress.

== Gallery ==
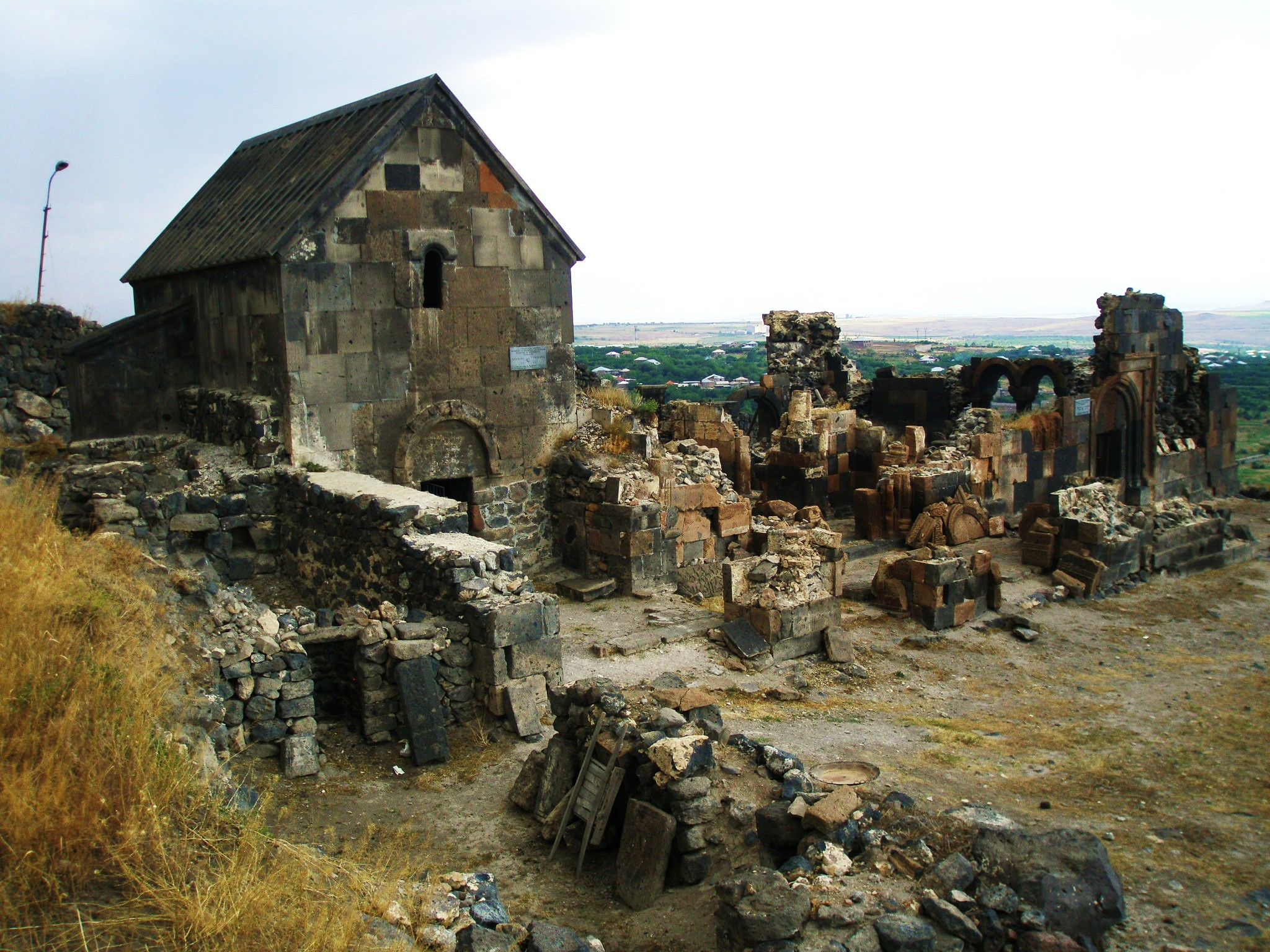
Ruins of the Saint Sargis monastic complex of the 7th to 13th centuries at Ushi

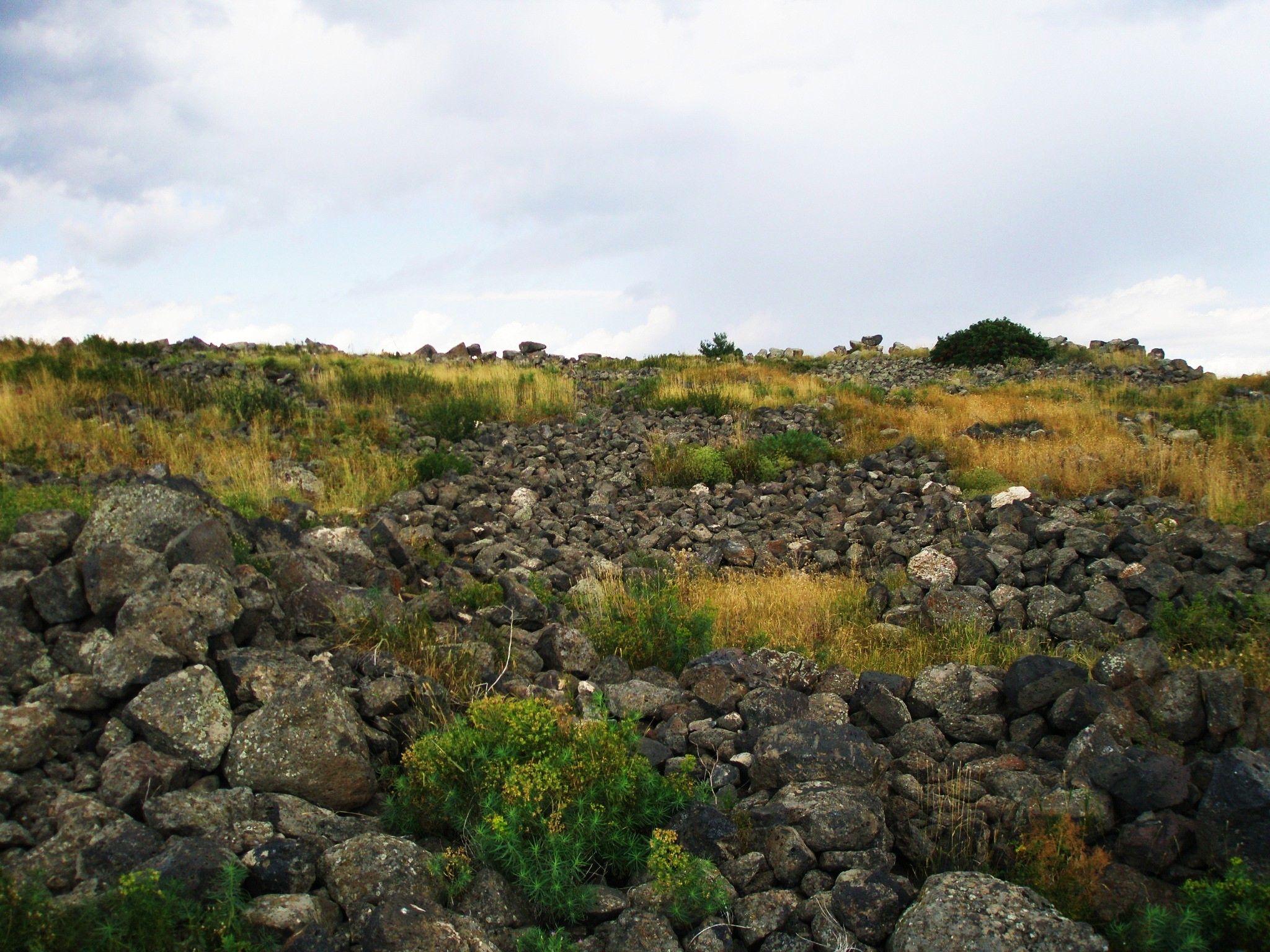
Iron Age fortress of Ushi
