= Sargis the General =

Christian saint (died 362/363)

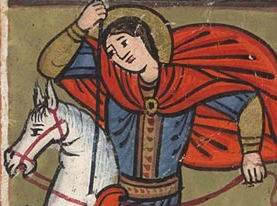
- Sarkis is usually depicted on a white horse.
- Died: 362 or 363
- Venerated in: Armenian Apostolic Church; Assyrian Church of the East
- Major shrine: Saint Sarkis Monastery of Ushi
- Feast: 63 days before Easter (moveable feast)
- Patronage: Youth and love

Saint Sargis the General or Sergius Stratelates (Armenian: Սուրբ Սարգիս Զորավար, romanized: Sourb Sargis Zoravar; (Note: Also romanized Sarkis.) died 362/3) was a Cappadocian Greek general who is revered as a martyr and military saint in the Armenian Apostolic Church and Assyrian Church of the East (5 January). The name Sargis (Sarkis) is the Armenian form of Sergius (Sergios).

Sargis was a general (stratelates) in the Roman Army stationed in Cappadocia. He went into exile in Persia during the reign of the pagan Roman emperor Julian. There he fell foul of Shah Shapur II and was killed along with his son, Martiros, during Shapur's Forty-Year Persecution.

Sargis the General is not to be confused with Sergius, the companion of Bacchus, who was martyred in the Roman Empire early in the fourth century. An Armenian hagiography of Sergius and Bacchus also exists.

== Hagiography ==
The History of the Life of Saint Sargis the General, (Note: Armenian: Patmut'iwn varuc'srboyn Sargsi zōravari.) the main account of Sargis's life and martyrdom and that of his son, was commissioned by the Patriarch Nersēs Šnorhali (1102–1173). According to his own account, Nersēs received a request from Grigor Tutēordi, a monk of the Monastery of Haghpat, for an account of the saint's life because the Georgians had been questioning the saint's origins. Nersēs then procured an Armenian translation of a Syriac life from the monastery of Mor Bar Sauma in Melitene. Nersēs made some slight emendations to this text and sent it to Grigor.

The prominence of the supernatural and divine providence suggest that the History of the Life as it has come down to us originates long after the events it narrates purportedly took place.

== Life ==
Little is known of the origins and early life of Sarkis. He lived during the 4th century and was a Greek from Cappadocia. Sarkis was appointed by the Roman emperor Constantine the Great as General in Chief of the region of Cappadocia bordering Armenia. He was reputed to possess the characteristics of piety, faith, and valour, and used his position to promote spiritual growth, teaching the gospel and encouraging church building.

Constantine's nephew Julian the Apostate became emperor in 361 and set about persecuting Christians throughout the Roman Empire. Sarkis was deeply concerned about these events and prayed for a solution. Jesus is said to have appeared to Sarkis and uttered the words: "It is time for you to leave your country and your clan, as did Abraham the Patriarch, and go to a country which I will show you. There you will receive the crown of righteousness prepared for you." Sarkis then left his military position and authority and, with his son Saint Martiros, sought refuge in Armenia under the protection of King Tiran (Tigranes VII). As Julian and his army advanced towards Antioch, Syria, slaughtering Christians, Tiran urged Sarkis and Martiros to leave Armenia for the Sassanid Empire.

Sassanid emperor Shapur II, hearing of Sarkis' reputation as a skilled military commander, appointed him to command the Sassanid army. Sarkis credited God for his military victories, which included fending off Julian's troops, preventing their entry into Shapur's kingdom. Sarkis urged troops serving with him to believe in the Creator of Heaven and earth, that their hearts might never be shaken.

Some of Sarkis’ soldiers were baptized by travelling priests with the Sassanid army, but some who were not baptized went to Shapur II and told him about the religious beliefs of Sarkis. Having realised that Sarkis was a Christian, Shapur summoned Sarkis, his son Martiros, and their 14 soldier companions who were newly baptized back to his palace, with the intention of testing their faith.

== Martyrdom ==
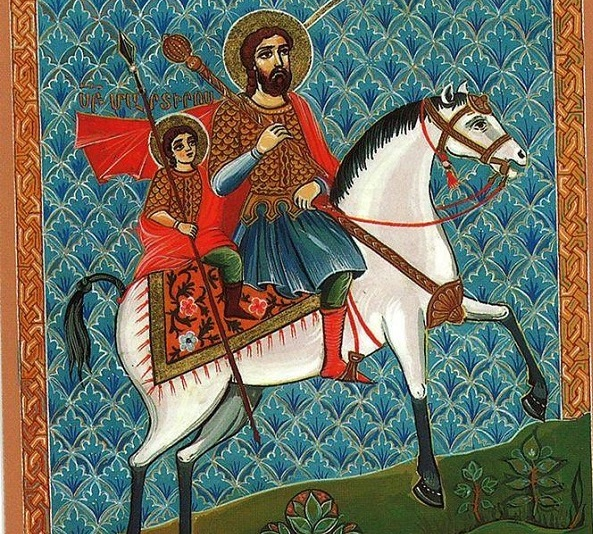
Saint Sarkis and his son, Saint Martiros, on horseback.

Shapur ordered Sarkis, Martiros, and their 14 companions to participate in a Zoroastrian ceremony in a fire temple, and offer sacrifices there. Sarkis refused Shapur's orders and said: ‘We should worship one God – the Holy Trinity, which has created the earth and the heaven. Whereas fire or idols are not gods and the human being may destroy them’.

After Sarkis had responded to the Sassanid King, he destroyed all the items in the fire temple. This annoyed the surrounding crowd who fell upon him and his son. Shapur, outraged by Sarkis’ actions, had his son Martiros killed before his eyes and had their 14 companion soldiers beheaded. Sarkis was put in prison, but when Shapur heard that Sarkis was strengthened by his relationship with his Lord in prison, he was outraged and ordered Sarkis’ execution.

At his execution Sarkis began to pray and an angel descended from heaven and told him, ‘Be strong. Do not fear the killers of your body; for the gate of the Kingdom of Heaven is open for you’. Sarkis, understanding the vision of the angel and the meaning of everlasting life, made one last passionate plea for people to accept Jesus, and was then killed. When he died, a mysterious light appeared over his body.

His remaining loyal followers retrieved Sarkis’ body, wrapped him in clean linen, and eventually sent his body to Assyria where it remained until the 5th century. Saint Mesrob took Sarkis’ relics back to Armenia to the village of Ushi where Saint Sargis Monastery of Ushi was built over the relics. The museums of the Mother See of Holy Etchmiadzin have now taken into their collection the relics of St. Sarkis, after they were uncovered during the excavation of St Sarkis church of Ushi village in 1999.

== Veneration ==
Saint Sarkis is one of the most beloved Saints within modern Armenian culture, as he is the Armenian patron saint of love and youth, similar to Saint Valentine. His feast day is a moveable feast, held anywhere between 11 January and 15 February according to the date of Easter that year. Each year, just prior to his feast day, there occurs the five-day Fast of Catechumens (commonly known nowadays as the Fast of Saint Sargis), which was established by Saint Gregory the Illuminator. Young Armenians, especially girls, abstain of water and food for three consecutive days for what they call the Fast of Saint Sargis (Սուրբ Սարգսի ծոմ).

Saint Sarkis Cathedral, Yerevan is dedicated to him. There were also churches dedicated to him in Adiguzel, Xnjorgin, Ahamar, Karavans, Hiwrcuk, Paxur, Hurur, Kehs, Kotenc, Bales, Alamek, Xultik, Kaynameran, Xonjalu and Ernkani. He was especially popular in the regions of Bitlis and Xizan. So widely venerated was Sargis, that he has even entered into Kurdish folklore.

== Customs ==
On the night preceding his feast day, faithful people place a tray full of flour or porridge before their door, believing that while passing by their door at dawn, Sarkis will leave the footprint of his horse in the flour symbolizing the fulfilment of their dreams.

On the eve of the feast young people eat salty biscuits and refrain from drinking water, so as to induce the appearance of their future bride or bridegroom in their dreams, bringing them water. These salty biscuits are named St Sarkis Aghablit. Traditionally eaten by girls, the practice is also now followed by boys.

On the feast day itself St Sarkis Halva, a sweet pastry stuffed with fruit and nuts, is widely eaten in Armenian communities to symbolise the blessings brought by the saint.
