= Martiros Aslanov =

Martiros Grigoryevich Aslanov (Russian: Мартирос Григорьевич Асланов; 1897–1977) was the founder of the Moscow school of Pashto studies in Russia.

Aslanov worked in the Soviet embassy in Afghanistan from 1930 to 1939; Aslanov graduated from the Moscow Institute of Oriental Studies in 1942, in 1946 he became a scientific collaborator of the Institute of Language and Cognition, where he worked until 1950, when he proceeded to work in the Institute of Oriental Studies (1950-1958). From 1958 to 1967 he worked at the Institute of Ethnography of the Academy of Sciences of the USSR.

Aslanov published around 50 works, including the Pashto-Russian dictionary.

== Bibliography ==
- "Учебный афгано-русский словарь". – М: МИВ, 1938. – 145 С. – Стеклогр. изд.
- "Учебник пушту. Часть 1. Вводний фонетический курс". – М.: ВИИЯ, 1942. – 132 С. – Стеклогр. изд.
- "Афганцы" // В кн.: Народы Передней Азии. – М., 1957. – С. 56-106.
- "Пуштуны" (совместно с В.И. Кочневым) // В кн.: Народы Южной Азии. - М., 1963. - С. 731-753
- "Афганско-русский словарь (пушту). 50 000 слов". – М.: Советская энциклопедия, 1966. – 994 С.

== Sources ==
- http://www.pashtoon.ru/pushtu-study-in-russia/aslanov-martiros-grigorevich/
