= Martiros Sarukhanyan =

Armenian political activist (1873 - 1895)

Martiros Sarukhanyan (Martik Levonyan, 1873, Shusha - 1895, Garahisar Mountain, Western Armenia) was an Armenian Fedayee and political activist.

After graduating from the College in Baku, Sarukhanyan continued his studies at the Saint Petersburg State Institute of Technology. He then studied in Geneva, where he supported the Social-Democrat Hunchakian Party's Central Committee. As a Hunchakian leader in 1894, he moved to Western Armenia and started working in Tabriz. Sarukhanyan became the Hunchakian leader of Van in 1895. He joined Dashnak and helped leaders Peto and Armenakan Mkrtich Avetisyan organize the self-defense effort at Van.

Sarukhanyan was killed in the Şebinkarahisar mountains in 1895 by Turkish troops.

The Armenian writers Avetis Nazarbekian and Shushanik Kurghinian both dedicated poems to his memory.

== Links ==
- Outstanding people of Karabagh

== Bibliography ==
- Martyrs on Bloody Path, by Dr Yeghia Jerejian, Beirut, 1989, p. 86-87
- Армянский вопрос: Энциклопедия, p. Константин Суренович Худавердян, 1991 - Страница 223
- Знаменитые арцахцы: Арцах (Карабах), Утик, Том 1 - Аршак Наапетович Вирабян - Апполон, 1992, p. 32
