= Debbagh =

Debbagh (in Arabic : الدباغ) (in English: Debbagh, Debbarh, Dabbagh) is a Moroccan family name.

== See also ==
- Atlas (mythology)
- Set (mythology)
- Amun-Ra
- Gurzil

== Sources ==
- Pure gold, ISBN 978-90-04-16415-4 (en)
- Paroles d'or, ISBN 978-2-914916-97-4 (fr)
- Al-Ibriz, Arabic book, pages 7, 8, 41 and 213. Publishing house: Dar Arrashad Al Haditha 98, bd Victor Hugo Casablanca, MA - (First edition).
- Internal sources: (from Adam & Eve to Abraham & Hagar:Genealogies of genesis), (from Abraham to Muhammed:Adnan), (from Muhammed to king Idriss I:Idriss I
