= Saint Martiros =

Christian saint

Martiros (Armenian: Մարտիրոս) or alternatively Mardiros (c. 4th century - died c. 362–363) was the son of Saint Sarkis the Warrior and a canonized saint just like his father; he is better known as Saint Mardiros (Armenian: Սուրբ Մարտիրոս)

Saint Sarkis the Warrior (Armenian: Սուրբ Սարգիս Զորավար), also known as Saint Sarkis the Greek was a 4th-century Centurion in the Roman Empire and a contemporary of the ruling Constantinian dynasty and the Arsacid dynasty of Armenia. The Roman Empire rulers set about persecuting Christians throughout the Empire. Sarkis then left his military position and authority and, with his son Martiros, sought refuge in Armenia under the protection of King Tiran of Armenia (Tigranes VII). As Roman Emperor Julian (known as Julian the Apostate) reached Antioch, Tiran urged Sarkis and Mardiros to leave Armenia for the Sassanid Empire.

The Sassanid emperor Shapur II, hearing of Sarkis' reputation as a skilled military commander, appointed him to command the Sassanid army. Sarkis credited God for his military victories, which included fending off Julian's troops entering into Shapur's kingdom. Sarkis urged troops serving with him to become Christians and believe in God the Creator of Heaven and Earth. Some of Sarkis’ soldiers were baptized by travelling priests of the Sassanid army, yet some who were dissatisfied with the ongoing Christianization went to Shapur II and told him about the religious beliefs of Sarkis. After realizing that Sarkis was a Christian, Shapur called up Sarkis, his son Martiros and his fourteen Christianized companions back to his palace. Shapur ordered Sarkis, Martiros and the baptized soldiers to participate and offer sacrifices in a Zoroastrian ceremony in a pagan temple. Sarkis refused Shapur's orders and instead destroyed religious items in the pagan temple. This outraged Shapur, who ordered Mardiros be killed in the presence of his father Sarkis. He also had his fourteen Christian companions beheaded but spared Sarkis to reconsider by sending him back to prison. But hearing that Sarkis was further strengthened by his relationship with the Lord in prison and was not recanting, Shapur ordered Sarkis' execution in 363.

Both Sarkis the Warrior and his son Martiros were canonized as Christian saints in the Armenian Apostolic Church.
