= List of Sufis =

List of notable Sufis

This list article contains names of notable people commonly considered as Sufis or otherwise associated with Sufism.

== List of notable Sufis ==
=== A ===
- Abadir Umar ar-Rida
- Arsafm Qudrat E Khoda
- Abd al-Rauf al-Sinkili
- Abd al-Wahid ibn Zaid
- 'Abdullah al-Harari
- Abu Anees Muhammad Barkat Ali
- Abu Bakr al-Kalabadhi
- Abu Nu'aym al-Isfahani
- Ahmad Shaheed Shah Sheykh ul Hind Qadri
- Alauddin Sabir Kaliyari
- Al-Fudayl ibn 'Iyad
- Al-Hakim al-Tirmidhi
- Al-Qushayri
- Abu al-Husain al-Nuri
- Abu Madyan
- Al-Sha'rani
- Al-Suyuti
- Al-Zaylaʽi
- Abu al-Abbas al-Mursi
- 'Abd Allah ibn 'Alawi Al-Haddad
- Abd al-Ghani al-Nabulsi
- Ahmad al-Rifa’i
- Ahmad Ezzeddine Assayad Al-Rifai
- Ahmad al-Tijani
- Ahmad ibn Idris
- Ahmad Zarruq
- Ali al-Qari
- Ahmad Sirhindi
- Ahmad al-Dardir
- Ahmad ibn Ajiba
- Ahmad al-Tayyeb
- Ahmad Yasawi
- Ali Gomaa
- Ali al-Jifri
- Abdalqadir as-Sufi
- Abdul Qadir Gilani
- Abd al-Aziz al-Dabbagh
- Ameer Muhammad Akram Awan
- Abdūl-Khāqeem Arvāsī
- Abdullah Ibn Umar Badheeb Al Yamani (1825–1892)
- Ad-Dağhestānī
- Mufti Akhtar Raza Khan Azhari
- Akhundzada Saif-ur-Rahman Mubarak
- Abdul Waahid Bin Zaid
- Abu Ishaq Shami
- Ahmad al-Alawi
- Ahmed Reza Khan Fazil-e-Barelvi (1856–1921)
- Kayhan Dede
- Al-Shaghourī
- Al-Busiri
- Ali Hujwiri (Daata Ganj Bakhsh, Persian/Punjabi: 990-1077)
- Ahamed Mohiyudheen Noorishah Jeelani
- Amadou Bamba (1853-1927)
- Arshadul Qaudri (1925–2002)
- Ata Hussain Fani Chishti (1817–1896)
- Azangachhi Shaheb (1828-1932)

=== B ===
- Baba Rexheb
- Baba Qamar U Zaman Faridi Chishti (1940-2011)
- Babajan (1806–1931)
- Baha' al-Din Naqshband
- Bande Nawaz
- Barkat Ali
- Bashir Wali Mushtaqi
- Bawa Muhaiyaddeen
- Bishr al-Hafi
- Bulleh Shah

=== D ===
- Dada Masiti
- Dawud al-Ta'i
- Dhul-Nun al-Misri

=== E ===
- El Hadj Malick Sy
- Esad Erbili

=== F ===
- Feisal Abdul Rauf

=== G ===
- Galip Hassan Kuscuoglu
- Ghousi Shah
- Ghulam Mustafa Khan
- René Guénon

=== H ===
- Haji Imdadullah Muhaajir Makki (1817–1899)
- Haji Abdul Malik Karim Amrullah
- Hamid Raza Khan
- Hamzah Al-Fansuri
- Harith al-Muhasibi
- Hasan al-Basri
- Hisham Kabbani
- Hussain Shah Noori (2007)
- Hilmi Işık

=== I ===
- Ibn 'Ashir
- Ibn 'Ata' Allah al-Sakandari
- Ibn 'Arabi
- Ibn Hajar al-Haytami
- Ibrahim al-Desuqi
- Ibrahim ibn Adham
- Ibrahim ibn Faïd
- Ibrahim Niass (1900 - 1975)
- Idries Shah
- Inayat Khan (1882–1927)
- Ismail Haqqi Bursevi
- Izz al-Din ibn 'Abd al-Salam
- Ivan Aguéli (1869-1917)

=== J ===
- Jahaniyan Jahangasht
- Jalaluddin Surkh-Posh Bukhari

=== K ===
- Kabir Ali Shah Churahi
- Khawajgi Amkangi

=== L ===
- Lal Shahbaz Qalandar

=== M ===
- Muhammad Qasim Sadiq of Mohra Sharif (1845-1942)
- Muhibbullah Allahabadi
- Mawlana Muhummad Attullah Sahib Faizani
- Muhammad Uthman Siraj al-Din
- Machiliwale Shah
- Mahmoodullah Shah
- Mahmud Esad Coşan
- Mahmut Ustaosmanoğlu
- Makdoom Hamzah
- Maqsood Ahmad Manzoor i Ilahi
- Maruf Karkhi
- Masoom Shah Noori
- Maula Shah (1836–1944)
- Maulana Fazl-e-Haq Khairabadi (1797–1861)
- Maulana Shahbaz Muhammad (1549–1640)
- Maulana Syed Muhammad Zauqi Shah (1878–1951)
- Meher Ali Shah of Golra Sharif (1859–1937)
- Shaykh Muhammed Mehmet Adil ar-Rabbani
- Mehmet Ensari ( 1860-1939)
- Mian Bashir Ahmed (1923– )
- Mir Sayyid Ali Hamadani
- Muhammad Bin Husayn al-Sulami
- Mohammad Badshah Qadri (1903–1978)
- Muhammad al-Yaqoubi
- Muhammad Alawi al-Maliki
- Muhammad Iqbal
- Muhammad Ishaq
- Muhammad Masihullah Khan
- Muhammad Metwalli al-Sha'rawi
- Muhammad Qadiri ( 1552-1654)
- Muhyiddin Ensari ( 1897-1978)
- Mu'in al-Din Chishti
- Mushtaq Wali Siraji (1919-1969)
- Mustafa Raza Khan Qadri
- Muzeyyen Vargonen Tarsusi el Ansari er Rifai el Qadiri (1967–)
- Maroof Hussain Shah Arif Qadri Gilani Naushahi
- Dr.Muhammad Ishaque Qadri Chisti Sabri Rifai Bayabani (1917–1992)

=== N ===
- Nadir Ali Shah
- Nahid Angha
- Nasiruddin Chiragh Dehlavi
- Nizamuddin Auliya
- Noor Shah Wali
- Nooruddeen Durkee
- Nuh Ha Mim Keller
- Nuruddin ar-Raniri
- Nazim Al-Haqqani

=== O ===
- Omar Saidou Tall
- Omar Ali-Shah
- Osman Nuri Topbaş

=== P ===
- Pir Nazeer Ahmed of Mohra Sharif Rawalpindi (1880-1960)
- Pir Gul Badshah of Mohra Sharif Rawalpindi (1917-1992)
- Pir Farooq Gul Badshah of Mohra Sharif Rawalpindi (1947-2007)
- Pir Mujtaba Farooq Gul Badshah (The official current Grand Custodian, Sajjada Nashin & Successor of Central Shrine Mohra Sharif Rawalpindi)
- Pir Fazal Ali Qureshi (d. 1935)
- Pir Muhammad Alauddin Siddiqui (1936-2017)
- Pir Hadi Hassan Bux Shah Jilani (1846–1900)
- Pir Naseer-uddin-Naseer of Golra Sharif (1949–2009)

=== Q ===
- Qalander Ba Ba Auliya (1898–1979)
- Qutbuddin Bakhtiar Kaki (1173-1235)

=== R ===
- Rabi'a al-'Adawiyya
- Rahman Baba
- Reshad Feild
- Riaz Ahmed Gohar Shahi
- Rumi
- Ruwaym

=== S ===
- Sari al-Saqati
- Sahl al-Tustari
- Sultan ul Arifeen Hazrat Syed Rakhyal Shah Sufi Al Qadri (1262-1359)
- Shaqiq al-Balkhi
- Sanai Hakim Sanai Ghaznavid
- Sidi Boushaki
- Shah Waliullah Dehlawi
- Sheikh Yusuf
- Syed Abul Fazal Sultan Ahmad
- Syed Faiz-ul Hassan Shah
- Syed Mahbub E Khoda
- Syed Rashid Ahmed Jaunpuri
- Syed Ghulam Mohiyyuddin Gilani
- Sultan Bahu (1630-1691)
- Shah Maroof Khushabi
- Shah Sulaimān Nūri (1508-1604)
- Shareef ud Din Maqbool e Ilahi (1919-1969)
- Said al-Chirkawi
- Said Nursī
- Shams Ali Qalandar
- Sayed Badiuddin Zinda Shah Madar
- Sayyid Mir Jan (1800-1901)
- Sayyid Sahib Husayni of Tekmal (1805–1880)
- Syed Jamal Al-Din Al-Afghani
- Shafiq Kamal
- Shah Abdul Aziz (1745–1823)
- Syed Maroof Hussain Shah Arif Qadri Gilani Naushahi
- Shah Inayat Qadiri (d. 1728)
- Shah Jalal (1271-1346)
- Shah Nazar Ali Kianfar
- Shah Niyaz (1742-1834)
- Shah Nooranī
- Shah Paran
- Shah Siddiq
- Sheikh Mustafa (1836–1888)
- Sheikh Madar
- Sidi Heddi
- Süleyman Hilmi Tunahan
- Syed Abul Fazal Sultan Ahmad Chandrapuri (1909–1984)
- Syed Mahbub E Khoda Dewanbagi (1949–2020)
- Syed Mohammed Asrarullah (1856)
- Syed Nasiruddin
- Syed Shujaat Ali Qadri
- Shah Abdul Latif Bhittai
- Syed Mohammed Mukhtar Ashraf
- Saalim Al-Madhar (1848–1908)

=== T ===
• Hazrat Syed tajuddin baba sher e Sawar

- Tahir Allauddin Al-Qadri Al-Gillani (1932–1991)
- Taj al-Din al-Subki
- Tajuddin Muhammad Badruddin of Nagpur (1861–1925)
- Taner Vargonen Tarsusi el Ansari er Rifai el Qadiri (1941–2023)
- Taqi al-Din al-Subki
- Tashna (1872–1931)
- Timothy Winter
- Tosun Bayrak

=== U ===
- Usman dan Fodio || Qadiriyya || b. 1754 – d. 1817 AD || Sokoto, Nigeria
- Uways al-Barawi

=== W ===
- Waheed Ashraf
- Waris Shah
- Waris Ali Shah
- Wasif Ali Wasif (1929–1993)

=== Y ===
- Yahya ibn Mu'adh al-Razi
- Yunus Ali Enayetpuri (1886-1952)
- Yunus Emre
- Yusuf al-Nabhani

=== Z ===
- Zaheen Shah
- Zakariyya al-Ansari
- Zakariyya Kandhlawi

== Sufi leaders ==
- Saladin
- Mehmed the Conqueror
- Shah Jalal
- Mahmud of Ghazni
- Ahmad Shah Durrani
- Diponegoro
- Mirwais Hotak
- Emir Abdelkader
- Izz ad-Din al-Qassam
- Omar al-Mukhtar
- Pir Nazeer Ahmed of Mohra Sharif
- Pir Gul Badshah of Mohra Sharif
- Pir Farooq Gul Badshah of Mohra Sharif
- Pir Mujtaba Farooq Gul Badshah (The official current Grand Custodian, Sajjada Nashin & Successor of Central Shrine Mohra Sharif Rawalpindi)

== See also ==
- List of Sufi saints
