= Sufism in Punjab =

Sufi tradition in Punjab

Sufism has played a major role in the history of Punjab. West Punjab, Pakistan is heavily influenced by Sufi Saints and major Sufi Pirs. The partition in 1947 led to the almost complete ethnic cleansing of Muslims from East Punjab. The Sufi shrines in the region continue to thrive, particularly among so-called ‘low’ caste Dalits that constitutes more than 30% of its population. After the partition the Dalit community took over the care of Sufi shrines in the East Punjab.

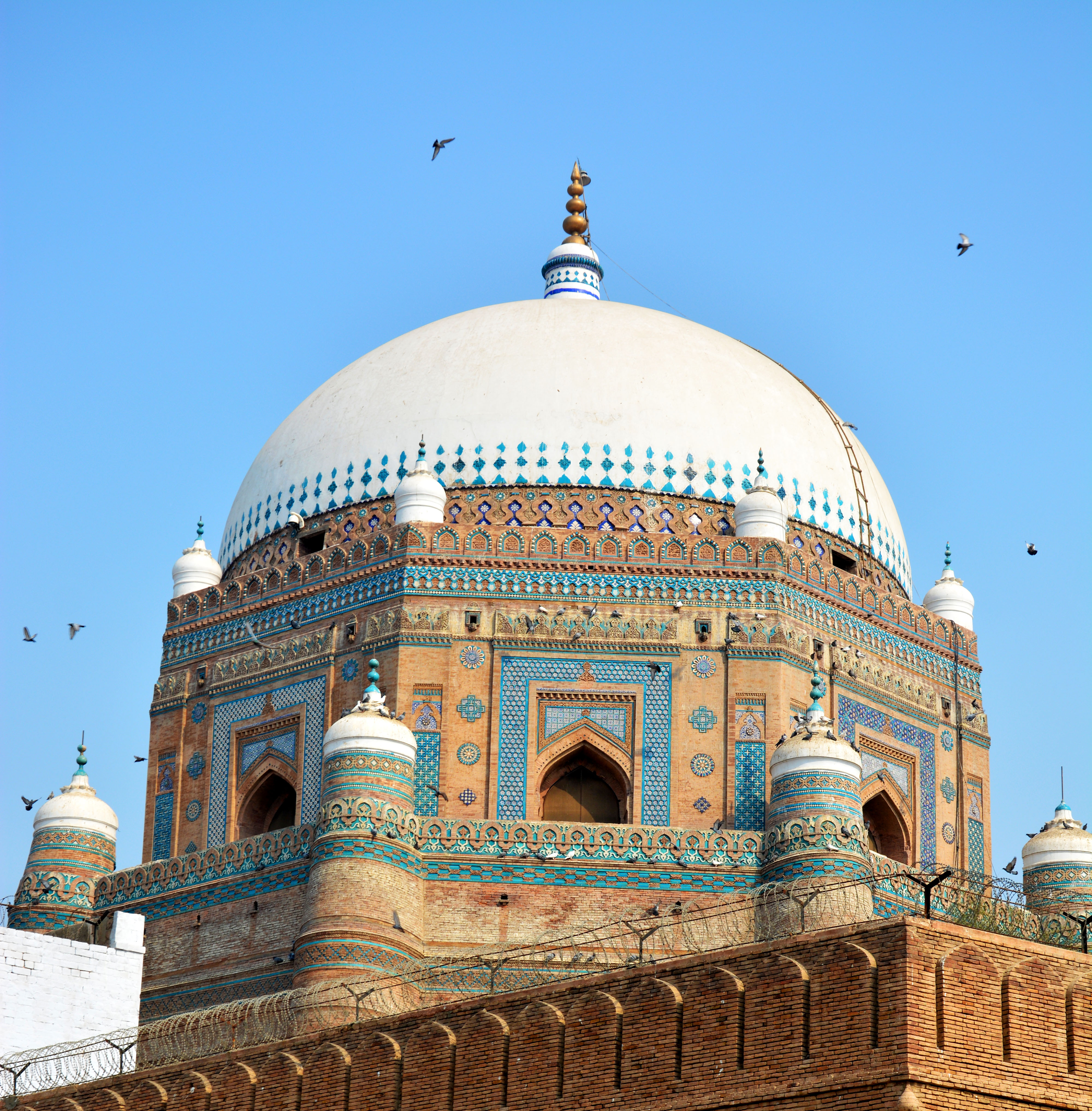
Shrine of Shah Rukn e Alam in Multan

== History ==
The majority of the Sufis in eastern Punjab come from the Chamar and Chuhra caste. Through the teachings of Guru Ravidass, some of the Dalits connect to the Qadiri and Chishti Sufi Orders. The holy Dalit Sufi Saints of Punjab are buried in graves that are painted in green and their tombs are covered with green cloth. Many proclaim themselves as disciples of Abdul Qadir Gilani, Khawaja Moinuddin Chishti, Baba Farid and other famous Sufis.

The relationship between Dalits and Sufism in India, particularly in Punjab, is explored in the documentary Kitte Mil Ve Mahi, produced in 2005 by Ajay Bhardwaj.

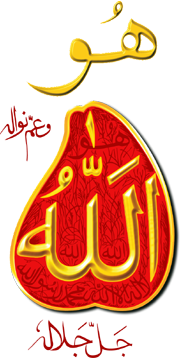
Allah's essence within a disciple's heart, associated with the Sarwari Qadri Order

The main Silsilas in Punjab include;

=== Qadri Noshahi ===
The Qadri Noshahi silsila (offshoot) was established by Naushah Ganj Bakhsh of Gujrat, Punjab, Pakistan, in the late 16th century.

=== Sarwari Qadiri ===
Also known as Qadiriya Sultaniya, the order was started by Sultan Bahu in the 17th century and spread in the western part of Indian subcontinent. It follows most of the Qadiriyya approach. In contrast, it does not follow a specific dress code or require seclusion or other lengthy exercises. Its mainstream philosophy is contemplation of belovedness towards God.

Naqshbandi Order

The Naqshbandi Order is one of the major Sufi orders in Punjab. It traces its spiritual lineage through Baha' al-Din Naqshband(1318–1389) and was further developed in South Asia through the teachings of Ahmad Sirhindi (1564–1624), whose Mujaddidi Order or branch became particularly influential across the Punjab region. The order emphasizes silent remembrance (dhikr), adherence to Islamic law, and spiritual guidance through an established chain of transmission.

A contemporary Naqshbandi Order and Mujaddidi Order associated with Punjab is Nisbat-e-Rasooli, founded by Pir Nazeer Ahmed at Mohra Sharif in present-day Murree District. Pir Haroon al Rasheed explained Nisbat-e-Rasooli that it places particular emphasis on cultivating a spiritual attachment (nisbat) to the Prophet Muhammad through adherence to the Quran and Sunnah.

== Culture ==
Sufism has had a lasting influence on the cultural life of Punjab through its Shrine, devotional poetry, Qawwali music, festivals, Urs and local traditions. Sufi shrines have historically served not only as places of worship but also as centres of learning, charity and community life, attracting visitors from different religious and social backgrounds. Annual celebrations, devotional music (Qawwali and Kafi), and the poetry of Sufi saints such as Baba Farid, Shah Hussain, Sultan Bahu and Bulleh Shah continue to form an important part of Punjab's cultural heritage.

Contemporary Naqshbandi-Mujaddidi traditions in Punjab continue to emphasise classical Sufi practices such as Dhikr (remembrance of Allah), spiritual discipline, ethical self-reform, and guidance under a spiritual teacher (Murshid). Within the Nisbat-e-Rasooli tradition associated with Mohra Sharif, particular emphasis is placed on regular Dhikr as a means of spiritual purification (Tazkiyah al nafs). The tradition teaches that purification of the heart enables the seeker to strengthen spiritual attachment (nisbat) to the Prophet Muhammad while remaining firmly grounded in the Quran and Sunnah.

== Major Punjabi Sufis ==
The major Punjabi Sufi saints include:

- Sakhi Sarwar (1120 – 1181)
- Baba Farid (1173 – 1266)
- Jahaniyan Jahangasht (1308 –1384)
- Shaikh Jamali Kamboh (1470 – 1536)
- Shaikh Gadai Kamboh (1500 – 1574)
- Shah Hussain (1538 – 1599)
- Naushah Ganj Bakhsh ( 1552 – 1654)
- Ahmad Sirhindi (1564 – 1624)
- Bari Imam (1617 – 1705)
- Sultan Bahu (1628 – 1691)
- Shah Sharaf (1640–1724)
- Shah Inayat Qadiri (1643 – 1728)
- Bulleh Shah (1680 – 1757)
- Ali Haider Multani (1690 – 1785)
- Farad Faqir (1720 – 1790)
- Waris Shah (1722 – 1798)
- Hashim Shah (1735 – 1843)
- Saleh Muhammad Safoori (1747 – 1826)
- Mian Muhammad Bakhsh (1830 – 1907)
- Muhammad Qasim Sadiq (1845 – 1943)
- Pir Nazeer Ahmed (1880 – 1960)
- Maula Shah (1836 – 1944)
- Khwaja Ghulam Farid (1841 – 1901)
- Ghulam Rasool Alampuri (1849 – 1892)
- Muhammad Iqbal (1877 – 1938)
- Sharif Kunjahi (1914 – 2007)
- Wasif Ali Wasif (1929 – 1993)
- Pir Haroon al Rasheed (1935 – 2022)

== See also ==
- Sufism in India
- Naqshbandi Order
- Nisbat-e-Rasooli
