= Pir Haroon al Rasheed =

Pakistani spiritual leader (1935–2022)

Pir Haroon al Rasheed (Urdu: پیر ہارون الرشید;1935-2022) was a Pakistani Sufi scholar from 1960 to 2022 till his death.

== Publications ==
He authored Taleem Nisbat-e-Rasooli, Gohar-e-Nayab and translation and Tafsir of Holy Quran i.e. Haqaiq-ul-Quran

== Death ==
Pir Haroon al Rasheed died on 28 February 2022. His funeral was attended by religious scholars, followers, and public figures.

== See also ==
- Mohra Sharif
- Muhammad Qasim Sadiq
- Pir Nazeer Ahmed
- Nisbat-e-Rasooli
- Shahzada Jamal Nazir
