= Ali Kianfar =

Sufi master, author and philosopher from Iran

Ali Kianfar is an Iranian-American Sufi master, author, teacher, philosopher and international speaker. He is a co-founder and co-director of the International Association of Sufism and Editor-in-Chief of the online journal Sufism: An Inquiry. He teaches Sufism and Islamic Philosophy.

== Early life ==
Kianfar was born in Iran and began his study of Sufism in his twenties under the supervision of Moulana Shah Maghsoud of the Uwaiysi school or “tarighat.” Kianfar was later appointed to teach in the Uwaiysi school.

Kianfar was among the first of Moulana Shah Maghsoud’s students to be given permission to teach Sufism. To commemorate this honor, his master gave Kianfar the title of “Shah Nazar,” (The Sight of the King) and accepted him as a spiritual son. He began his teaching in Iran.

== Career ==
Since his arrival in the United States in 1979, Kianfar began teaching Sufism for Persian and American audiences through private gatherings and university lectures. Kianfar also established a Department of Sufism and Islamic Philosophy at Yuin University in Los Angeles. He served as the chair of that department.

Kianfar has given talks on Sufism, Islam, Spirituality and the relationship between Science and Spirituality at conferences held in Australia, Egypt, Scotland, Spain, The United States and Uzbekistan.

Kianfar’s approach in explaining Sufism to western audiences relies as much on contemporary science and psychology as it does on traditional Sufi philosophy. Among Kianfar’s many sayings is "Tranquility is available only by the unity of heart and mind.”

Kianfar created the "40 Days: Alchemy of Tranquility" program. This Sufi-Psychology system brings Western psychology, psychological principles and Sufi teachings together to establish a new and innovative approach to psychotherapy. His principles are introduced through the 40 Days team and the therapists at the Community Healing Centers in the Bay Area of California.

Kianfar has been involved in interfaith events, dialogue and conferences. He and his wife and IAS co-founder, Nahid Angha, have helped to raise awareness about the peaceful dimensions of Islam and Islamic spirituality.

== Bibliography ==
- "Illumination of the Names: Meditation by Sufi Masters on the Ninety-Nine Beautiful Names of God," IAS, 2011, ISBN 978-0918437273
- "Seasons of the Soul: The Spoken Wisdom of Shah Nazar Seyyed Ali Kianfar," IAS, 2006, ISBN 978-0918437259
- "The Zekr," IAS, 2000, ISBN 978-0918437013
- "Fatimah" (in Farsi)
- "Oveys-e-Gharan and the History of the Robe"
- "An Introduction to Religion," IAS, 1996, ISBN 978-0918437136

Kianfar contributes articles regularly in the online journal Sufism: An Inquiry and to the Sufism-Psychology Series, "Human Self, Volume 1: Body," IAS, 2012, ISBN 978-0-918437-29-7
