= Hüseyin Hilmi Işık =

Islamic studies scholar (1911–2001)

Personal life
- Born: 8 March 1911 Eyüp, Istanbul, Ottoman Empire
- Died: 26 October 2001 (aged 90) Istanbul, Turkey
- Main interest(s): Fiqh, Islamic ethics, Kalam, Tafsir
- Education: Istanbul University
- Website: huseyinhilmiisik.com

Religious life
- Religion: Islam
- Denomination: Sunni
- Jurisprudence: Hanafi
- Tariqa: Naqshbandi
- Creed: Maturidi

Muslim leader
- Disciple of: Abdulhakim Arvasi
- Influenced by: Abu al-Hassan al-Kharaqani, Baha' al-Din Naqshband, Ahmad Sirhindi, Abu Hanifa, Abu Mansur al-Maturidi, Mirza Mazhar Jan-e-Janaan

Huseyin Hilmi Işık (March 8, 1911 – October 26, 2001) was a Turkish, Sunni Islamic scholar.

== Life ==
Hüseyn Hilmi Işık was born in Eyüp, Istanbul. He received religious education from mujtahid Abdulhakim Arvasi. He learned ma'qûl, manqûl, usûl and furû' as it relates to fiqh, tafsîr and hadîth. Hüseyn Hilmi Efendi was graduated with the Ijâzat-ı Mutlaqa (Certificate of Absolute Authority) for religious instruction in 1953.

Hüseyin Hilmi was educated in science and religion. He began studying at the School of Chemical Engineering. He learned calculus from Von Mises, mechanics from Professor William Prager, physics from Dember Harry L. and technical chemistry from Goss. He worked with Fritz Arndt, a Professor of Chemistry, and evoked his appreciation. In the last six months of the research he carried out under his supervision, he synthesized and determined a formula for ester "phenylcyannitro-methan-methyl." This successful research, which was the first in its field in the world, was published in The Journal of The Istanbul Faculty of Science and in the German chemical journal Zentral Blatt (number 2519, in 1937) under the name of Hüseyn Hilmi Işık. When he received a Diploma of Master of Science in Chemical Engineering (numbered 1/1) in 1936, Hüseyn Hilmi Işık appeared in the daily papers as the first and unique Chemical Engineer in Turkey.

He published one hundred and forty-four books, sixty are Arabic, twenty-five Persian, fourteen Turkish, and the remaining translated books consist of French, German, English, Russian, various Turkic languages as well as Bosnian, Albanian and other languages. His most important book is Tam İlmihâl Seadet-i Ebediyye. It was published in English under the title Endless Bliss.

He died on October 26, 2001, and was buried in the historical Eyüp Cemetery.
