= Uwaisi =

Sufi mystic order in Sunni Islam

The Uwaisī (or Owaisi; Arabic: أُوَيْس) or Oveyssi silsila (chain of transmission) or tariqa (pathway) is a form of spiritual transmission in the vocabulary of Sufism, named after Owais al-Qarani. It refers to the transmission of spiritual knowledge between two individuals without the need for direct interaction between them.

== Background ==
In the science of spirituality of Islam (Tasawwuf) the Uwaisi Transmission occurs when the spirits of righteous believers (saliheen, awliya) meet in the world called `alam al-arwaah (the world of spirits) which is beyond `alam al-ajsam (the material plane). Whoever takes knowledge through spirituality from a master in `alam al-arwaah is called "Uwaisi". This means of transmission is considered as powerful and effective as the physical relation of master and disciple.

The term "Uwaisi" is derived from the name of Owais al-Qarani, who never met the Islamic prophet Muhammad in person, yet was fully aware of his spiritual presence at all points in his life.

In Classical Islam and the Naqshbandi Sufi Tradition, by Hisham Kabbani, it is noted that:

The sign of the Favor of Allah Almighty and Exalted on his servant is to authorize one of His saints to uplift that servant to the Divine Presence. That is why many saints who came in previous times were guides for those who came after through this spiritual (Uwaisi) connection. It is known that many saints have been under the guidance and training of prophets and other saints that lifted them up.

== Contemporary Western orders ==
Silsila Owaisi is an active Uwaisi Sufi order from the United Kingdom led by Shaykh Banaras Owaisi. They operate a charity and offer spiritual healing services.

The "Uwaysi Order, a Shi'i branch of the Kubrawiya, was brought to the West by its shaykh, Shah Maghsoud Angha." There are two recent and distinct contemporary branches of the Uwaisi Order in the West following lengthy legal disputes between Shah Maghsoud's offspring.

One is Maktab Tarighat Oveyssi Shahmaghsoudi, headed by Nader Angha, the son of Shah Maghsoud. The other is the Uwaiysi Tarighat, led by Shah Maghsoud's daughter, Nahid Angha and her husband, Ali Kianfar. The couple co-founded the International Association of Sufism.

== Muhammadia Uwaisia Order ==
Muhamadia Uwaisia Order is blessed to Shaykh Muhammad Owais Naqibi Qadri Suharwardi AbuAlAlai Naqshbandi, Chishti Sabri Jahangiri.

Shaykh Muhammad Owais was granted permission of Uwaisia silsila directly from Muhammad in his court in Madinah in 1st Shaban 1434 AH (2013 CE) and Muhammad blessed this silsila with the name "Mohammadia Uwaisia" (or "Muhammadia Uwaisia" or "Muhammadiya Uwaisia" or "Muhammdiya Owaisia"; Arabic: محمدئة أُوَيْسئة).

Last shaykh of silsila Uwaisa was Nūr ad-Dīn 'Abd ar-Rahmān Jāmī (Persian: نورالدین عبدالرحمن جامی) (1414-1492 CE).

== See also ==
- Naqshbandia Uwaisia
- Uwais al-Qarani
