= Topbaş =

Topbaş is a Turkish surname. Notable people with the surname include:

- Kadir Topbaş, Turkish architect and politician
- Mustafa Latif Topbaş, Turkish businessman
- Osman Nuri Topbaş, Turkish Sufi master
