= Bazm-e-Maula Shah =

Pakistani non-profit-organisation

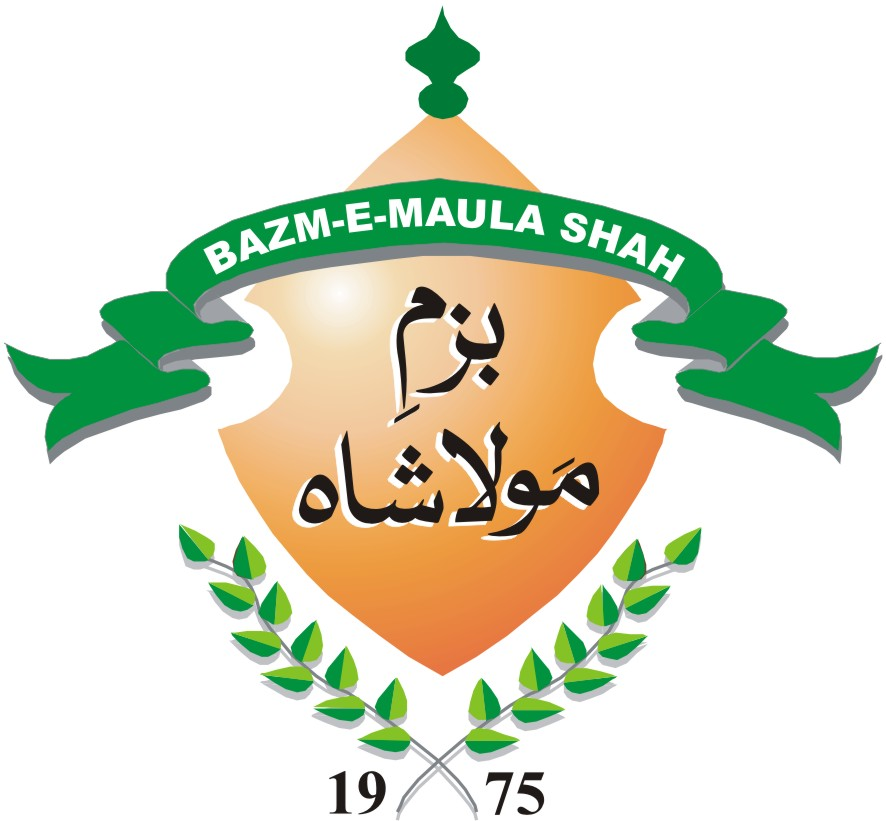
Bazm-e-Maula Shah (BMS) is a registered, literary organization. This organization has been established in 1975 by the name of Sain Maula Shah, an eminent Sufi saint, creator of seven folk tales in Punjabi literature. This organization organize "Maula Shah Conference" every year, besides other literary works.

Bazm-e-Maula Shah is a volunteer organization in Lahore, Pakistan. In the beginning it was known to be as “ Sain Maula Shah Welfare Society ” but On June 20, 2004, nomenclature was changed as “ Bazm-e-Maula Shah ” and later on it was registered permanently. At present its Head-office is at 41 – A, Chohan Road, Islampura, Lahore.
Bazm was started On 7 February 1975 at Karyal Kalan (Gujranwala) and got timely, registered in 1976. As far as the Memorial Society “Bazm-e-Maula Shah” (SMSWS) stated on self-help basis with the cooperation of the villagers of Karyal Kalan, followers and relatives of Sain Maula Shah . His grandson Mian Muhammad Ismail Manzar was nominated as its patron and first president. Finances to meet the purposes are mostly assigned to any well-to-do member of the organization or collected by contribution. At the time of its start the following two main objects were aimed at:

1- To get the modern facilities from the Govt. for villagers.

2- To republish the books of Sain Maula Shah after their collection.

For the 1st purpose Engineer Liaqat Ali Rathore and Prof. Mian Maqbool Ahmad played an active role for the supply of water and electricity, establishment of Public library and Dehi Markaz-e-Sehat and construction of melted road.
For the 2nd purpose the marvelous efforts of Dr.Mian Zafar Maqbool are quite praise worthy who has succeeded to collect and arrange the republication of Maula Shah Books.
All books can be had from Sh. Muhammad Bhashir & Sons, Urdu Bazar, Lahore, Pakistan.

On the occasion of the annual Urs in 1992 at Karyal Kalan the following persons were awarded the literary awards for the 1st time:

Prof. Dr. Shehbaz Malik, Prof. Dr. Ismatullah Zahid, Prof. Dr. Aftab Ahmad Naqvi (Late), Prof. Mian Maqbool Ahmad, Mr. Muhammad Sharif Gill, Master Hashmat Ali Jalandhri, Engr. Liaqat Ali Rathore, Mr. Zaheer-ud-Din Babar, Mr. Tahir Jamil Sheikhupuri, Mr. Abdul Hameed Khan

After that the 1st Maula Shah Conference was held in Al’Hamra Hall No. 3 at Lahore on 18 October 2003.
The conference was presided over by the present president of the organization Sahibzada Prof. Mian Maqbool Ahmad. In the conference different papers were read on the life and works of the saint poet Maula Shah. In the end literary awards were distributed among the following persons:

Prof. Dr. Shehbaz Malik, Prof. Dr. Ismatullah Zahid, Prof. Dr. Mazhar Mahmood Sherani, Dr. Syed Akhtar Hussain Akhtar, Dr. Mian Arshad Mahmood, Syed Sibtul Hassan Zegham, Mst. Sheerin Masud Khadar Posh, Engr. Liaqat Ali Rathore, Mian Zafar Maqbool .
