= Abd al-Aziz al-Dabbagh =

18th-century Moroccan Islamic scholar and Sufi mystic

‘Abd al-‘Azīz ibn Mas‘ūd ad-Dabbāgh
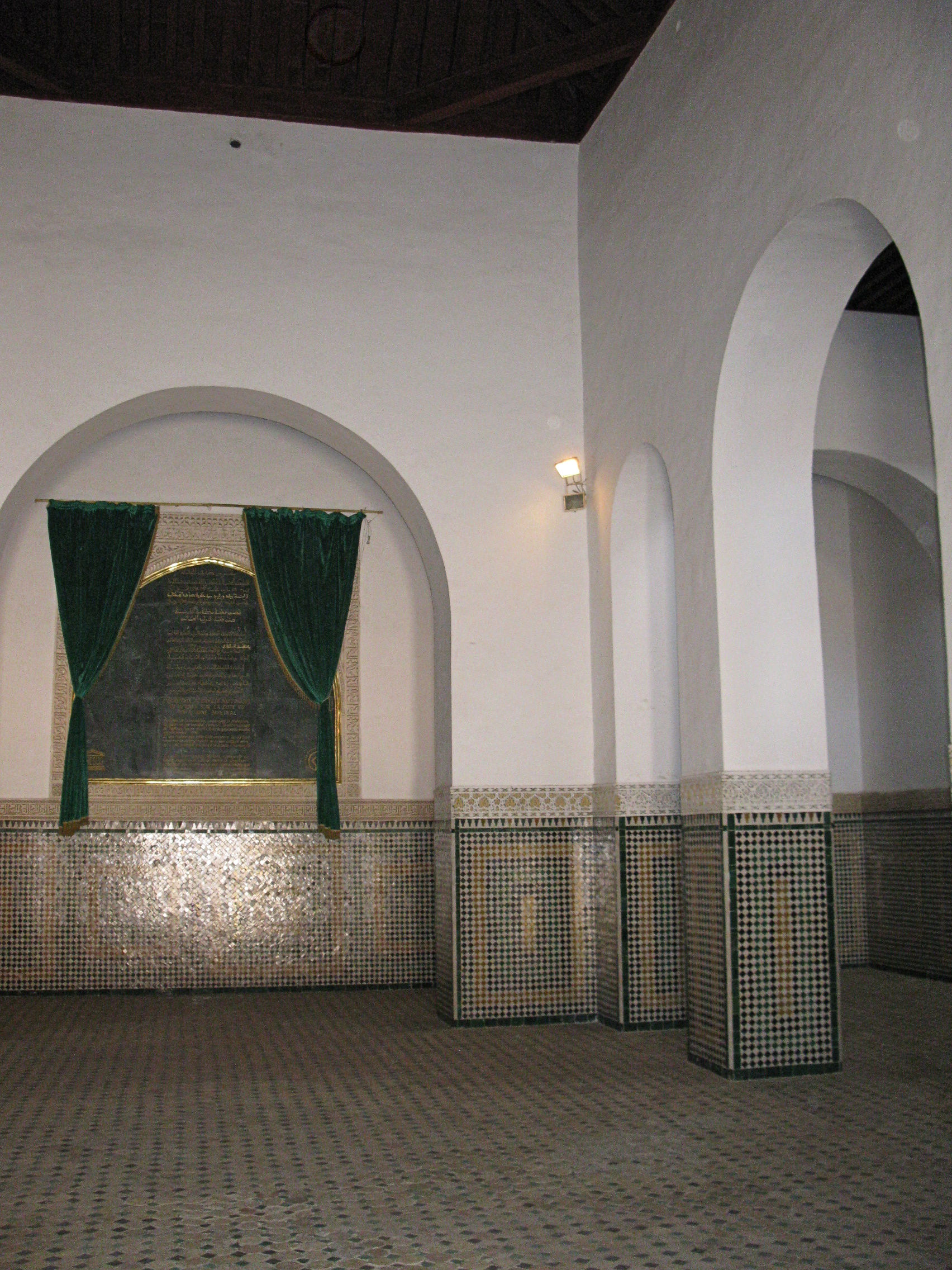
- Interior of the tomb of Abd al-Aziz al-Dabbagh in Fez, Morocco.

Personal life
- Born: 1684 Fez, Morocco
- Died: 1718–1719 Fez, Morocco

Religious life
- Religion: Islam
- Denomination: Sunni (Sufī)
- Jurisprudence: Mālikī
- Creed: Akhbarism, with the doctrine of Wahdat al-Wujūd

Muslim leader
- Influenced by: Abu al-Abbas al-Khidr (claimed)
- Influenced: Ahmed Sijilmasi

‘Abd al-‘Azīz ibn Mas‘ūd ad-Dabbāgh (1684–1718/19) was a Moroccan Sufi mystic, ascetic and Islamic scholar who lived in Fez, Morocco.

== Biography ==
‘Abd al-‘Azīz ibn Mas‘ūd ad-Dabbāgh was born in Fez, Morocco in 1684. His family claimed descent from Idris al-Akbar, the founder of the Idrisid dynasty. Ad-Dabbagh was functionally illiterate and did not study under any scholars due to his disability, except with a man whom he claimed to be the legendary Abu al-Abbas al-Khidr, who educated him on the values of the Ahl al-Bayt and the Islamic prophet Muhammad. With the tutelage of his mentor, Al-Dabbagh adopted the Maliki jurisprudence and the doctrine of Wahdat al-Wujud, a common doctrine in Sufi metaphysics and theology. He also delved deeply into Sufism, becoming a praised figure and ascetic in the Shadhili order, which was the dominant Sufi order in North Africa at the time. Al-Dabbagh eventually received an ijazah that allowed him to teach classes, with his closest disciples being Ahmad ibn al-Mubarak and Muhammad al-Murabiti, who wrote about him after they had achieved scholarly status. He also founded his own order of Sufism, known as the Muhammadiyyah, which branched off from the Shadhili order.

Ad-Dabbagh died in 1718 or 1719 and was buried in the Bab al-Futuh graveyard in eastern Fez, where a pyramidal roofed tomb was built atop his grave by his followers.

== Doctrine ==
Abd al-Aziz al-Dabbagh followed the Maliki school in terms of jurisprudence, while for his creed, it was Akhbarism, independent from the prominent Ash'ari and less prominent Athari schools of theology.

On the topic of the Divine Attributes, Al-Dabbagh took a stand similar to that of contemporary Athari theology, stating that the attributes of God be accepted by the apparent in a literal manner and not with tafwid, citing that such matters be "left only to God" without further interpretation. However, Al-Dabbagh incorporated Ash'ari views in his theology, stating that the speech of God can be heard, in both literal and metaphorical contexts. Al-Dabbagh also held the Maturidi view of Takwīn ("bringing into being"), stating that it is to be considered as an eternal attribute of God.

Most of the students of Al-Dabbagh were adherents of the Ash'ari theological school as well, indicating that Ash'ari views were prevalent on him. Furthermore, Ash'arism was more prevalent in the Maghreb and North Africa, unlike the Athari theology that was often associated with the Hanbali school.

== Works ==
Abd al-Aziz al-Dabbagh did not leave behind any written works. His student, Ahmad ibn al-Mubarak, compiled the Al-Ibrīz min Kalām al-‘Ārif bi-Allāh Sayyidī ‘Abd al-‘Azīz al-Dabbāgh (The Pure Gold in the Words of Sayyidi Abd al-Aziz al-Dabbagh), which is a compilation of the writings and lectures of Al-Dabbagh involving Qur'anic exegesis and esoteric interpretations of hadiths. This work was also adapted into the Tafsir al-Ibrīz, a commentary on the Qur'an for Javanese audiences.

== See also ==
- List of Malikis
- List of Sufis
