= Shah Sulaimān Nūri =

Saudi Arabian scholar and saint (1508–1604)

Shah Suleman
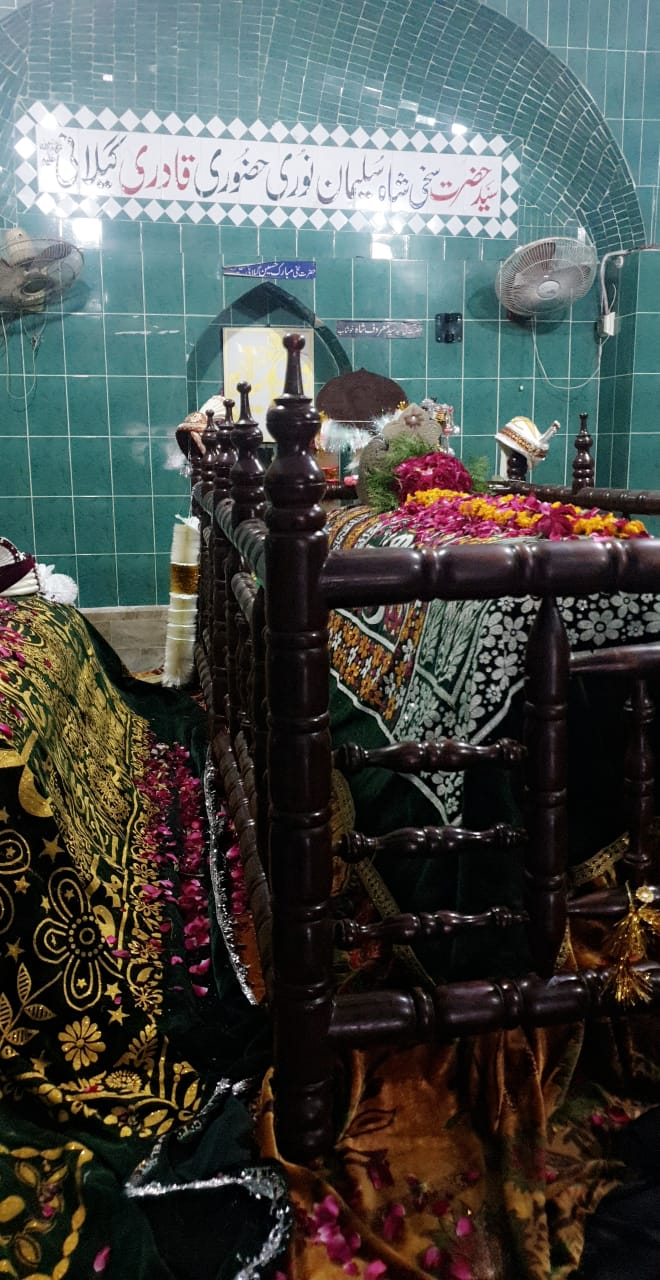
- Born: 9 September 1508
- Died: 27 March 1604 (aged 95)
- Resting place: Purana Bhalwal, Bhalwal Sharif
- Title: Sakhi, Noori Hazoori, Shah e Shahan
- Predecessor: Shah Maroof Khushabi
- Successor: Muhammad Qadiri
- Children: Raheem Dad, Taj Mahmood
- Parent(s): Father:Abdullah, Mother: Bhaag Bhari

Shah Suleman Noori Hazoori (also known as "Sakhi Badshah"; 9 September 1508 – 27 March 1604) was a scholar, saint and Sufi of Qadiriyya silsila (lineage) in the subcontinent that became modern day Pakistan. His spiritual teacher (murshid) was Shah Maroof Khushabi.

== Early life and education ==
Shah Suleman father's name was Abdullah who was a follower of Shah Maroof Khushabi. His mother's name was Bhaag Bhari. Suleman was born on 9 September 1508. His family lineage belongs to Quraysh.

He received his spiritual teachings from Shah Maroof Khushabi. The recorded story is that Shah Maroof used to visit Abdullah's house. One day Shah Maroof Khushabi visited Shah Suleman's house. At that time Shah Suleman was age 4. Shah Suleman was playing in the front yard. He identified Suleman as his successor and the cause for which he was sent to the town. He called Suleman and kissed his forehead. He then asked his father to keep the boy safe as he would be his entrustment.

Shah Suleman had two wives: Romal Khatun and Jaurana Khatun, and two sons: Raheem Dad and Taj Mehmood.

== Spiritual lineage ==
He belonged to the lineage Silsila e Qadriyya as below:

- Muhammad
- Ali
- Hasan al-Basri
- Habib al-Ajami
- Dawud Tai
- Maruf Karkhi
- Sirri Saqti
- Junayd of Baghdad
- Abu Bakr Shibli
- Abdul Aziz bin Hars bin Asad Yemeni Tamimi
- Abu Al Fazal Abdul Wahid Yemeni Tamimi
- Mohammad Yousuf Abu al-Farah Tartusi
- Abul Hasan Hankari
- Abu Saeed Mubarak Makhzoomi
- Abdul Qadir Gilani
- Syed Abdul Wahab Gilani
- Syed Abdul Salam Gilani
- Syed Ahmad Gilani
- Syed Masood Gilani
- Syed Ali Gilani
- Syed Shahmeer Gilani
- Shams Uddin Gilani
- Shah Muhammad Ghoas Gilani
- Syed Mubarak Haqani Gilani Uch Sharif
- Shah Maroof Farooqi Chisti Qadri
- Sakhi Shah Suleman Noori Hazoori

== Travel and successor ==
Shah Suleman Noori was ordered by his teacher (murshid) to travel to different places, so he travelled to Shahpur, Khushab, Chawa, Deowal, Jukali, Takht Hazaara, Kashmir and Gujrat, preaching Islam. Afterwards his teacher(murshid) ordered him to reside in Purana Bhalwal.

Due to his generosity he earned a honorific title "Sakhi".

He was succeeded by Muhammad Qadiri who founded the Qadria Naushahia silsila.

== Death and shrine ==
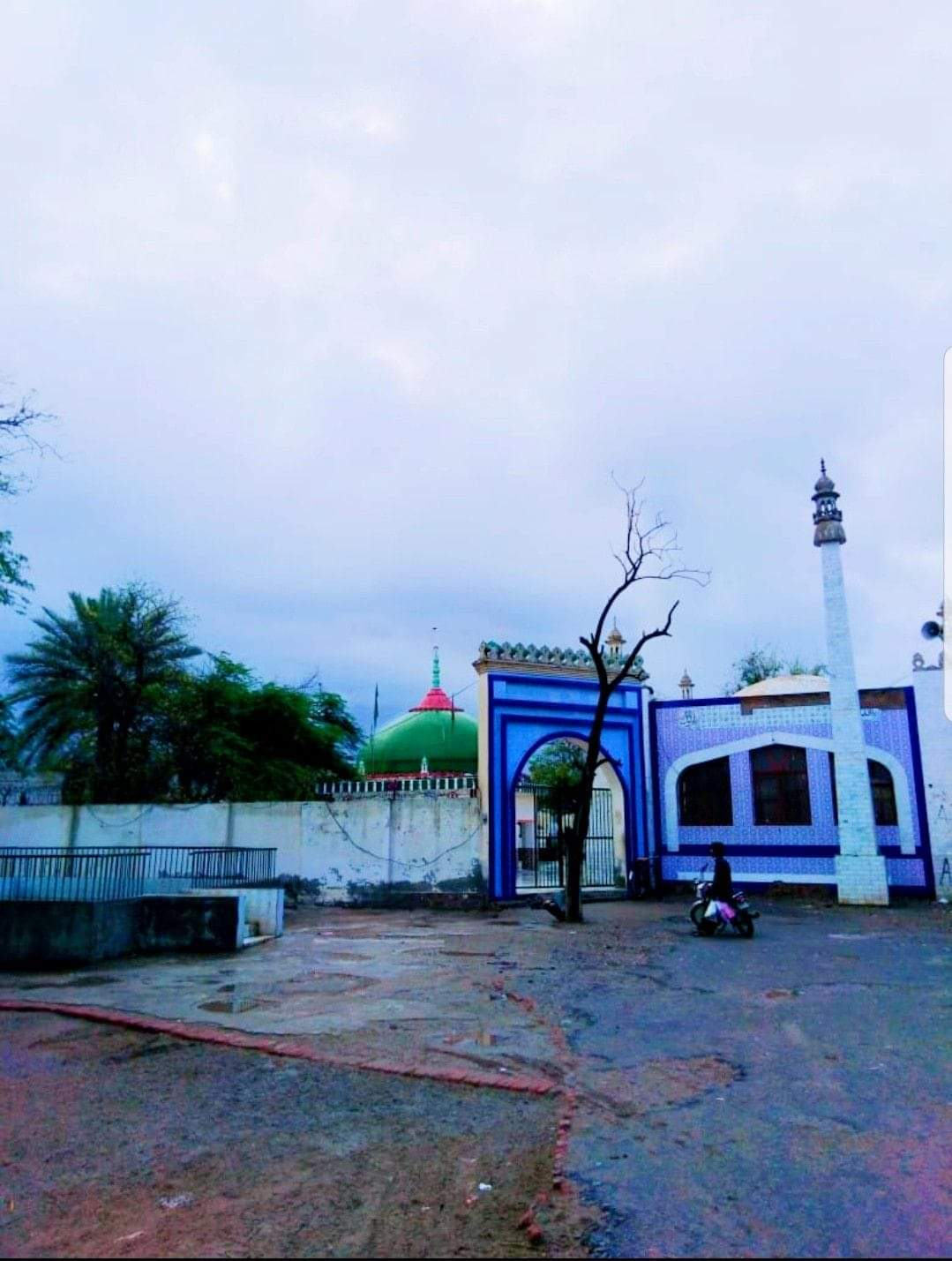
DARBAR SHARIF SAKHI SHAH SULEMAN NOORI HAZOORI

Shah Suleman Noori Hazoori died on the night of Friday the 27th Ramzan ul Mubaraik 1604 at the age of 96 years. His shrine in located in Purana Bhalwal. The large central grave is of Shah Suleman while the first grave on the right side is of his grandson Abdul Wahid. The 2nd grave on the right side is of his son Raheem Dad. On the left hand, the 1st grave is of his grandson Abdul Wahab while the 2nd grave is of his other son Taj Mahmood.
