= International Association of Sufism =

US-based religious non-profit organization

International Association of Sufism (IAS)
- Founded: 1983
- Founders: Nahid Angha, Shah Nazar Seyyed, Ali Kianfar
- Type: Non Profit, UN NGO/DGC
- Purpose: Sufism, Education, Human rights, Global Peace, Social Justice, Psychotherapy, Outreach
- Location: San Rafael, California, USA
- Region served: United States, international
- Website: www.ias.org

International Association of Sufism (IAS) is a California nonprofit organization headquartered in Marin County. It is a United Nations' NGO/DGC and the first organization established to organize an inclusive forum that opens a line of communication among Sufis all around the world. IAS launched a global intra-faith movement among Sufis and Sufi Schools.

IAS has played an important role in inter-faith dialogue and cooperation, both in California and internationally. Through the support and efforts of many Sufis and Sufi Schools, IAS has successfully expanded its founding goals to also include and organize programs and projects with a focus on global peace and nonviolence, education, human rights advocacy, promoting women's rights and leadership, supporting efforts to end world Hunger, and supporting freedom of religion, among others. IAS has received the status of Non Governmental Organization from the Department of Global Communication of the United Nations (DGC/NGO). IAS has supported and contributed to the work of Amnesty International, UNICEF, and received recognition from UNESCO for its global peace effort in 2000.

== History ==
The IAS was founded by Nahid Angha and Ali Kianfar in 1983. Angha is the eldest child of the Shah Maghsoud Sadegh Angha of the Uwaisi Sufi order and was the first woman appointed to teach in her father's school in the late 1960s. Kianfar was a disciple of Moulana Shah Maghsoud and is an internationally published author and a commentator of the Qur'an.

== Work ==
IAS and its members have worked globally to successfully accomplish its founding missions and goals to: introduce Sufism in all its varied forms to the public; make known the interrelation between Sufi principles and scientific principles; provide a forum for a continuing dialogue between the different schools of Sufism; preserve and advance the study and goals of Sufism.

Through its journal Sufism an Inquiry, Conferences, Lecture Series, Classes, Educational Programs and Projects, Publication and Productions and Newsletters the IAS has expanded its founding goals to also include programs focused towards global peace and non-violence, education, human rights, women's rights and leadership, ending world's hunger, supporting freedom of religious beliefs, providing children immunizations and school supplies, and working in partnership with grassroots organizations providing free medical care, portable water, and other critical services where most needed.

The IAS has received the status of Non Governmental Organization from the Department of Public Information of the United Nations (DPI/NGO), supported and contributed towards the works of Amnesty International, UNICEF, and received recognition from UNESCO for its global peace efforts in 2000.

The IAS has received many awards and recognition and has also played an important role in global peace, inter-faith dialogue and cooperation both in California and internationally. IAS has partnered with many organizations to represent Sufism and Islam, including the Interfaith Center at the Presidio, National Inter-religious Leadership Delegation to Washington, D.C., Assembly Members of the Council for the Parliament of the World's Religions, United Religions Initiative, Assembly Member at UNESCO Culture of Peace, Millennium Peace of Religious Leaders UN, among others.

== Programs ==
IAS's programs include Building Bridges of Understanding, a cooperative educational program, including conference organization, which it runs in cooperation with the Humanities Department of Dominican University of California, with support from the Marin Community Foundation; Forty Days: Alchemy of Tranquility, which consists of workshops allowing participants to access their hidden wisdom and to use it in daily life; Sufi Symposium, an international, multicultural festival; and Voices for Justice.

=== Symposia ===
The annual International Sufi Symposium, sponsored by the International Association of Sufism, attracts hundreds of Sufis from around the world.

At the 2000 symposium, "The Need for Sufism in a New Century - An Old Tradition for a New World", IAS co-founder Dr Ali Kianfar delivered a speech entitled "Self and Discovery". He said:

There is a saying amongst Sufis, that always there is a question, but we have to look for a Quest. A Quest raised from the heart. So we all have a Quest, but we get the answer according to our question.

The 2001 symposium, held in Fremont, California, had the theme of "The Soul's Longing: A Language of Spirit", where attendees explored "the wisdom and beauty of Sufism in society". More than a dozen Sufi masters spoke at the conference and led prayer and meditation (zikr), and there were presentations of Sufi music and poetry.

In September 2006 the symposium was convened at Edinburgh, Scotland, the first time such an event had held in Europe. The event was sponsored by the International Association of Sufism, together with the Edinburgh Institute for Advanced Learning and the Edinburgh International Centre for World Spiritualities.

=== Conferences ===
The conferences organized by the IAS have brought together men and women from a wide variety of national backgrounds and "with different degrees of emphasis on Islamic sharia practice and customs". The meetings give prominence to Sufi Meditation, Zikr, music, poetry, interfaith discussions, and academic lectures by scholars, translators, physicians, and psychotherapists.

=== Projects ===
The IAS's projects include Literacy Project, in which members of the Sufi Women Organization help tutor those with literacy needs; Prison Project, an outreach programme to those in jail; Project Khaneghah, which is dedicated to building a Sufi community centre or Khanqah, and United Nations and Human Rights, in its role as United Nations NGO.

=== Modernism and equality ===
An important aspect of the International Association of Sufism is the role that women play in the organization. The IAS stresses a gender-equitable approach. With a foundation in Islam, which has a tradition of respect for women and rights for women dating back to the Prophet, the association and its departments stress and practice a gender-equitable approach in their work.

Arife Ellen Hammerle wrote an article entitled Women and Islam for Human Beams magazine in August 1999. Speaking from her personal experiences as a woman, mother, Sufi and American, she relates:

Sufism has taught me the meaning of freedom and equality amongst humanity. The capacity to surrender, submit and remember God in every breath and in every moment reveals the true quest of the heart.

IAS is modernist despite its traditional Sufi trappings. In the preface to The Sufi orders in Islam, John O. Voll talks of the growing strength of Sufi tariqas amongst modern people who are not trying to escape modernity, that traditionalists would have difficulty conceiving or crediting, citing the International Association of Sufism, whose annual meeting in California was attended by 800 people in 1996.

In Sufism and the 'Modern' in Islam, the authors write: "The [IAS] is very much in the avant-garde of transnational Sufism, hardly resembling traditional orders or spirituality at all. Instead, it represents itself as an 'educational organization' and a UN affiliated NGO that carries out a UN Human Rights project."

== International cooperation ==
Working with other faiths, Community Healing Centers director, Uwaiysi Sufi and qualified psychotherapist, Arife Ellen Hammerle, was invited to make a presentation at the Council for a Parliament of the World's Religions in 1999.

In August 2000, representatives of the IAS were amongst one thousand religious leaders, including the Grand Mufti of Syria and Chief Rabbi of Israel, who attended the Millennium World Peace Summit of Religious and Spiritual Leaders held at the United Nations HQ in New York.

The IAS was also invited to participate in the Interreligious Engagement Project (IEP21) Global Dialogue of Civilizations Project in 2007.

== Publications ==
=== IAS journal ===
The IAS regularly publishes a journal, Sufism Journal. Sufism: An Inquiry is also available free of charge on the internet.

=== IAS books ===
Members of the association have published a number of books, many under the association's own imprint, including translations of the works of Moulana Shah Maghsoud which often adopt a scientific approach to spiritual matters.

- Angha, Nahid (translator), Deliverance: Words from the Prophet
- Angha, Nahid, Ecstasy: The World of Sufi Poetry and Prayer
- Angha, Nahid, The Journey of the Lovers
- Angha, Nahid, The Journey: Seyr va Soluk
- Angha, Nahid, The Nature of Miracle
- Angha, Nahid, Principles of Sufism
- Angha, Nahid (translator), Selections: Poems from Khayam, Rumi, Hafez, and Shah Maghsoud
- Angha, Nahid, Shah Maghsoud: Life and Legacy
- Etemad-Moghadam (Angha), Mah Talat, translated by Angha, Nahid, Al-Momenon: The Faithful
- Hammerle, Arife Ellen, The Sacred Journey: Unfolding Self Essence
- Institute for Sufi Studies, Unveiling Islam
- Kianfar, Seyyedeh Hamaseh A. and Kianfar, Seyyedeh Sahar A. (translators and compilers), Sufi Stories
- Kianfar, Shah Nazar Seyyed Ali, An Introduction to Religion
- Kianfar, Shah Nazar Seyyed Ali, Fatemah
- Kianfar, Shah Nazar Seyyed Ali, The Zekr
- Levin, E.L., The Road to Infinity
- Maeda, Yoshimichi, Sahar (Dawn)
- Maghsoud, Moulana Shah, Diwan-e-Ghazal (in Persian)
- Maghsoud, Moulana Shah, translated by Angha, Nahid, Manifestations of Thought
- Maghsoud, Moulana Shah, translated by Angha, Nahid, A Meditation
- Maghsoud, Moulana Shah, translated by Angha, Nahid, Psalms of Gods
- Mohammed, Hazrat Mir Ghotbeddin, translated by Angha, Nahid, Destination: Eternity
- Newman, Safa Ali Michael, The Gift of the Robe: Uwaysieh
- Pryor, Amineh Amelia, Psychology in Sufism, Volume One
- Sufi Women Organization members, Sufi Women Cookbook
- Various, Sufi Women: The Journey Towards the Beloved (collected essays)
- Various, The Veil: Hijab (collected essays)
- Various, Women's Wisdom: Women in Action Conference (collected essays)

== See also ==
- Uwaiysi
