= Ahmed Sijilmasi =

18th-century Moroccan Islamic scholar

Aḥmad ibn Mubārak al-Sijilmāsī (1679–1742) was a Moroccan Islamic scholar of the Maliki school from Sijilmasa. Living the rest of his life in Fez, Al-Sijilmasi was a student and close companion of the Sufi mystic Abd al-Aziz al-Dabbagh, compiling narrations and lectures from his teacher into the work Al-Ibrīz min Kalām.

== Biography ==
Aḥmad ibn Mubārak ibn Muḥammad ibn ʿAlī al-Sijilmāsī was born in 1679, with his epithet indicating that he was born in the town of Sijilmasa. Along with his family, he moved to the city of Fez in 1698, mainly to further his education. There, he studied under five scholars in the University of al-Qarawiyyin, adopting the Maliki school of thought and receiving an ijazah, certifying him as a legitimate scholar of Fez. Al-Sijilmasi retreated to the outskirts of the city, meeting with the Sufi mystic Abd al-Aziz al-Dabbagh, becoming a disciple and student of the mystic and learning the doctrines and disciplines of Sufism under him. Between 1718–1719, Al-Dabbagh died and so Al-Sijilmasi wrote the Al-Ibrīz min Kalām, a compilation of lectures and narrations from Al-Dabbagh that he found to be beneficial to the Muslim community. He also transmitted stories about the miracles he had witnessed from Al-Dabbagh.

Living an ascetic life towards his final years, Al-Sijilmasi was very critical towards worldy life as well as rulers. He died in 1742 and was buried in the cemetery of Bab al-Futuh in eastern Fez, next to Al-Dabbagh. A pyramidal roofed mausoleum was erected over there tombs which became a popular spot for pilgrimage and religious visits.

== Works ==
Al-Sijilmasi's most well-known written work is the Al-Ibrīz min Kalām al-‘Ārif bi-Allāh Sayyidī ‘Abd al-‘Azīz al-Dabbāgh (The Pure Gold in the Words of Sayyidi Abd al-Aziz al-Dabbagh). It compiles lectures, narrations and advice from the titular figure, delving into esoteric interpretations of hadiths and mystical themes in Qur'anic exegesis. His work was influential in Indonesia and was adapted into the Tafsir al-Ibrīz, a commentary on the Qur'an for Javanese audiences.

== See also ==
- Abd al-Aziz al-Dabbagh
- List of Malikis
