= Abu Bakr al-Kalabadhi =

10th Century Sufi Maturidi scholar and Hanafi jurist

Abu Bakr al-Kalabadhi (Arabic: أبو بكر الكلاباذي), in full, Abu Bakr ibn Abi Ishaq Muhammad ibn Ibrahim ibn Ya‘qub al-Bukhari al-Kalabadhi (Arabic: أبو بكر بن أبي إسحاق محمد بن إبراهيم بن يعقوب البخاري الكلاباذي) (fl. late 10th century, Bukhara) was a Persian Hanafi Maturidi Sufi scholar and the author of the Kitab at-ta'arruf, one of the most important works of Sufism composed during the first 300 years of Islam.

== Life ==
Very little is known about his life. His Arabic name (Nisba) indicates that he lived in Kalabadh (a district of Bukhara) and was probably of Persian ancestry. Depending on the source, he died in 990, 994 or 995. His grave in Bukhara still receives many visitors.

Kalabadhi studied Sufism under Abu al-Husayn al-Farisi and Fiqh under Muhammad ibn Fadl.

== Works ==
Of his six or seven works, two in Arabic survive:

- Bahr al-fawa´id/ Ma´ani al-akhbar. Short moral commentaries on 222 of the Hadith.
- Kitab at-ta'arruf (the English translation by A. J. Arberry is called The Doctrine of the Sufis.)

Al-Kalabadhi's fame rests on the Kitab at-ta'arruf. The work itself consists of 75 relatively short chapters, but several long commentaries have been appended. The work was written primarily for two purposes: to advocate the Sahu ("sober") school of Sufi thought and to assure adherents of orthodox Islam that Sufism does not contradict their beliefs. The second point was of special importance, as Sufism was in danger of being declared a heresy.

Not long before, in 922, the famous Sufi al-Hallaj had been publicly executed on allegations of heresy. This must have had a significant effect on al-Kalabadhi. He quotes al-Hallaj frequently in his works, but never by name. He is simply referred to as "one of the great Sufis".

The book is still understandable for modern readers and preserves many important quotes from the first three hundred years of Islam.

== See also ==
- List of Sufis
- List of Sufi saints
