= Naushah Ganj Bakhsh =

Punjabi sufi scholar and saint (1552–1654)

Naushāh Ganj Bakhsh
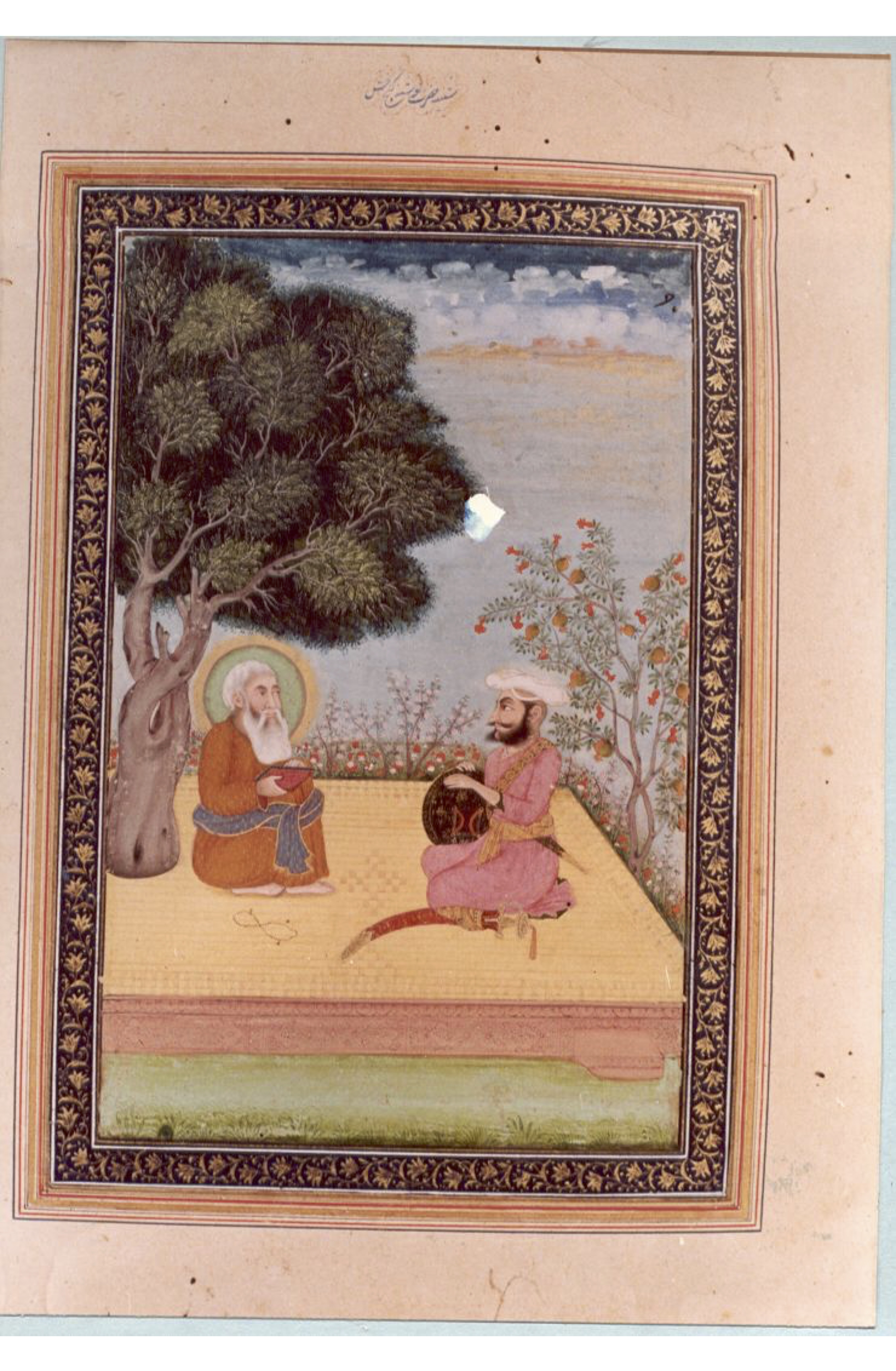
- Painting of Hazrat Nausha Ganj Bakhsh, from a manuscript in the collection of Rampur Raza Library

Personal life
- Born: c. 1552 Phalia, Punjab, Mughal Empire (present-day Punjab, Pakistan)
- Died: c. 1654 (aged 101 or 102) Phalia, Punjab, Mughal Empire (present-day Punjab, Pakistan)
- Resting place: Ranmal, Phalia Tehsil, Mandi Bahauddin District, Punjab, Pakistan
- Main interests: Tassawuf; Divine love

Religious life
- Religion: Islam
- Philosophy: Sufism
- Tariqa: Qadri

Muslim leader
- Influenced by: Shah Sulaimān Nūri
- Influenced: Naushāhiyyas

Haji Muhammad Naushāh Ganj Bakhsh (21 August 1552 – 18 May 1654) was a Punjabi Muslim Sufi poet, saint and scholar from Phalia in Punjab. He was the founder of the Naushahiah branch of the Qadiriyya Sufi order, and his successors came to be known as Naushāhiyyas.

== Biography ==
Muhammad Naushah was born on 21 August 1552 in Phalia, Punjab to a Punjabi Khokhar family. His father, Hajji Ala’uddin Qadiri, was an ascetic, while his mother Bibi Jiuni belonged to a respectable family.

Naushāh was the most outstanding disciple of Sufi saint Shah Sulaimān Nūri of Naushera. He later shifted to Shahanpal in Mandi Bahauddin where he died in 1654.

== Teachings ==
Naushāh was respected by his contemporaries including nobles and rulers. He accepted the syncretic approach of Kabir and Guru Nanak but with more emphasis on monotheism or the oneness of God. Like Kabir, he rejected caste and criticised the idea of transmigration of souls. Naushāh enrolled his followers from different castes and occupations. They were Bhattis, Mochis, Lohars, Tarkhans, Awans, Jats and others. He condemned the caste system in his following dohras (a rhyming couplet in the Punjabi poetry):

"Saiyid and Jat, both are human beings. Both are the sons of Adam and Eve.

Naushah do not ask the descent of a faqir, but enquire about the way that leads to Lord. This is the right mode of speech."

== Literary works ==
The following works have been published:

- Kulliyāt-i Naushāh: (Urdu poetry) consisting of 76 Risala's and 2400 verses.
- Kulliyāt-i Naushāh: (Punjabi poetry) In this work 126 Risala's of about four thousand verses are alphabetically arranged.
- Ma‘ārif-i Tasawwuf: (Persian poetry) dealing with assignments on the spiritual path.
- Mawā'iz-i Naushāh Pīr: (Punjabi prose) comprises delivered speeches and advices.

== Gallery ==
The shrine of Naushah Ganj Bakhsh at Ranmal, near Phalia in Punjab, Pakistan

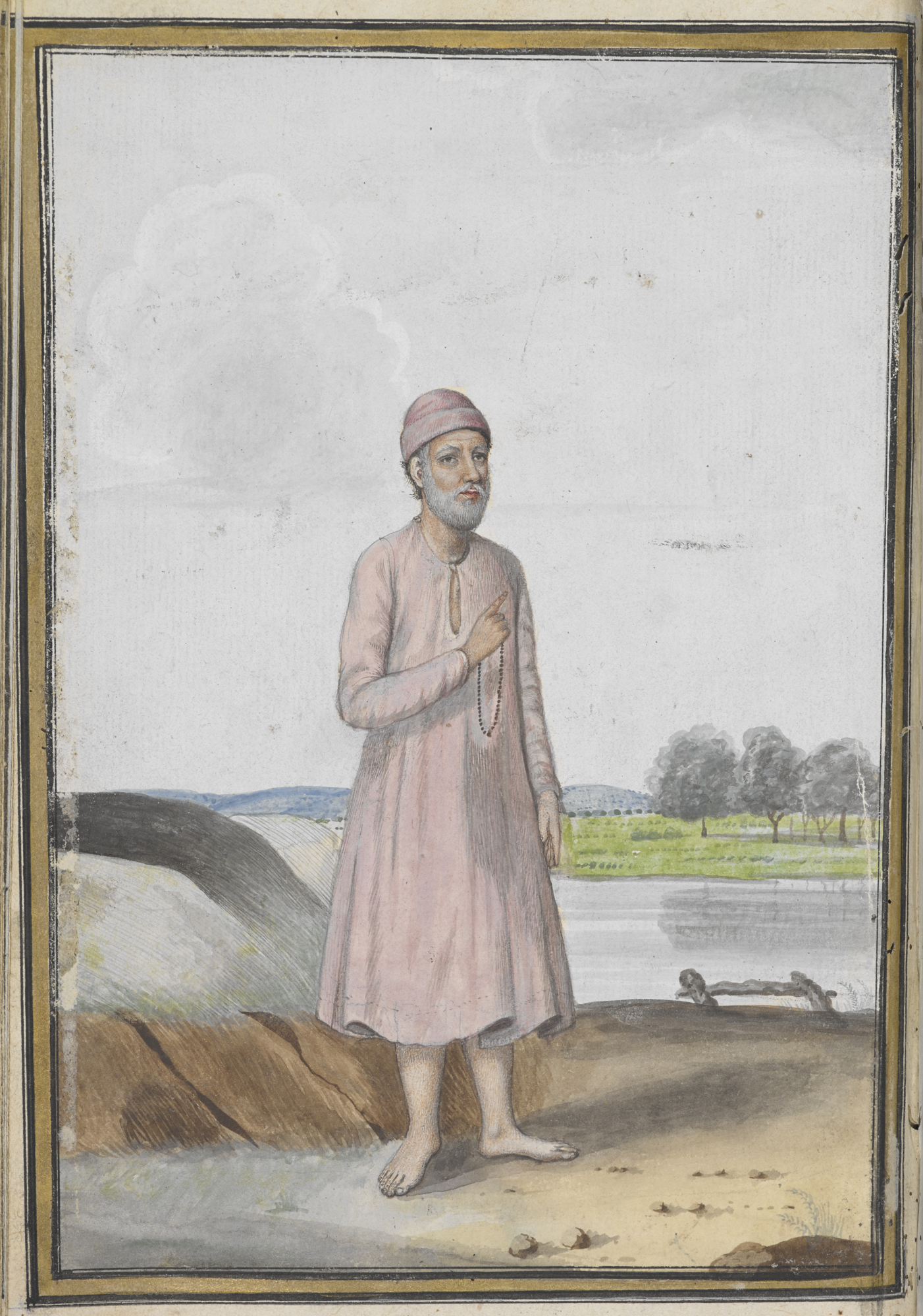
Painting of a Ganjbakhshi follower, Fuqara'-i Hind, circa early 19th century

== See also ==
- Sufism in Punjab
