= Custody =

Custody may refer to:

== Government and law ==
- Child custody, a description of the legal relationship between a parent (or guardian) and child
- Custody and repatriation, a Chinese administrative procedure 1982–2003
- Legal custody, a legal term in England and Wales for a person held under the law
- Arrest or police custody, a lawful holding of a person by removing their freedom of liberty
- Remand (detention), otherwise known as remanded in custody
- Imprisonment (Terminology varies, but in common law, detention before charge is referred to as custody and continued detention after conviction is referred to as imprisonment.)

== Organizations and enterprises ==
- Custodian bank, a specialized financial institution responsible for safeguarding a firm's or individual's financial assets
- Custos (Franciscans), often referred to as custody, the institution of the Franciscan Order of the Catholic Church

== Arts, entertainment, and media ==
=== Films ===
- Custody (1988 film), Australian TV film featuring Peter Carroll
- Custody (2000 film), American comedy film starring Linda Larkin
- Custody (2007 film), American Lifetime TV film starring Rob Morrow
- Custody (2016 film), American courtroom drama film
- Custody (2017 film), French film
- Custody (2023 film), Indian action thriller film written and directed by Venkat Prabhu

=== Television ===
- "Custody" (Flashpoint), a 2009 episode of Flashpoint
- "Custody" (Law & Order), an episode of Law & Order

== See also ==
- In Custody (disambiguation)
- Custodian (disambiguation)
