= Khawajgi Amkangi =

Sufi Muslim saint (1513 – 1599)

- Title: Khawajgi Amkangi

Personal life
- Born: 1513 (AH 918)
- Died: 1599 (AH 1008)
- Era: Islamic golden age
- Main interest(s): Tasawwuf, Islamic theology,
- Occupation: Sufi

Religious life
- Religion: Islam
- Denomination: Sunni
- Jurisprudence: Hanafi
- Creed: Ash'ari

Khawajgi Amkangi (Persian: خواجگی امکنگی), known also by his full name Khwaja Muhammad Amkangi, was a Sufi Muslim saint.

== Biography ==
Khawajgi Amkangi was a resident of the Amkana area of Bukhara. He was born in 918AH, which corresponds to 1513AD.He is counted among the great Sufia and Imams of the Naqshbandi chain. He got the lesson of Tariqat from his father, Hazrat Sheikh Darwish Muhammad Samarkandi, and he was one of the Sahib-e-Kashf Sheikhs. After his father's death, Hazrat Khawaji Amkangi took over the responsibilities of his Musnad Irshad. He remained on this post for almost forty-eight years.

== Death ==
Muhammad Khwaja al-Amkanagi died in 1008 AH/1599 CE. He passed his secret to Khwaja Baqi Billah.

== See also ==
- List of Sufis
- Khwaja Muhammad Baha'uddin Naqshband Bukhari
