= Galibi Order =

Turkish Sufi mystic order in Islam

The Galibi Order of Sufism is a descendant of the Qadiriya and Rifa'iya orders – the integration of the earliest and the most popular orders established in Islam. It was known as the Qadiriyyah-Rufai order until the order branched off its ancestor school in 1993, and began to be called after the name of its sheikh, Galip Hasan Kuşçuoğlu. The Order's central dargah is in Istanbul and it has various branches throughout Turkey (e.g., Ankara, Çorum, Adana, Gaziantep, Kütahya, Isparta, Antalya). The Galibi are Hanifi in fiqh and Alevi in disposition. They follow Maturidi and Ash'ari schools in the matters of theological inquiry.
