= Mohammed Asrarullah Hussaini =

South Asian Sufi saint (1856 - 1920)

Personal life
- Born: Syed Mohammed Asrarullah Hussaini; 1856 Damascus, Syria
- Died: 1920 (aged 63–64) Hyderabad, India
- Known for: Founder of Masjid-e-Baghdadi (Tek-ki-Masjid)
- Other name: Imam Ali Shah
- Occupation: Sufi saint

Religious life
- Religion: Islam

Muslim leader
- Influenced by: Ahmed Raza Khan Barelvi

Syed Mohammed Asrarullah Hussaini, popularly known as Imam Ali Shah (1856 - 1920) was a sufi saint and a contemporary of Ahmed Raza Khan Barelvi.

Hussaini migrated from Damascus, Syria to Berar Province now in Maharashtra, India, and then to Hyderabad at the age of 18. He claimed to be a descendant of the Islamic prophet Mohammed.

He laid the foundation and constructed Masjid-e-Baghdadi also known as Tek-ki-Masjid, which is attached to his shrine in Nampally, Hyderabad, Telangana.

The annual Urs is organised on 4th Jumada al-thani of the Islamic calendar.

== See also ==
- List of Sufis
- List of Islamic studies scholars
- Hyderabad State
- Hadith
- Sufism
