= In Custody =

In Custody may refer to:

- In Custody (novel), a novel set in Delhi, India by Anita Desai
- In Custody (film), a film based on the novel by Ismail Merchant

== See also ==
- Custody (disambiguation)
