= Custodian =

Custodian may refer to:

== Occupations ==
- Fullback (rugby league), in rugby, also called a sweeper
- Janitor, a person who cleans and maintains buildings
- Legal guardian or conservator, who may be called a custodian in some jurisdictions

== Religion ==
- Custodian of the Holy Land (i.e., Custos), an appointed ecclesiastical office in the Franciscan Order
- Custodian of the Two Holy Mosques, the official title of the head of Saudi Arabia, where the two holiest mosques of Islam are located
- Hashemite custodianship of Jerusalem holy sites, a role claimed by Jordan in administering Jerusalem's holy sites

== Finance ==
- Custodian bank, also called a custodian, an organization responsible for safeguarding a firm's or individual's financial assets

== Other uses ==
- Clean-up crew or custodian, a term used for various arthropods in a terrarium
- The Custodian, a 1993 Australian film
- Custodian bank, an organization responsible for safeguarding a firm's or individual's financial assets
- Custodian helmet, the helmet worn by many members of the British Police Force
- Traditional custodian, a term describing Indigenous Australians' relationship to land

== See also ==
- Custody (disambiguation)
