= Shah Maroof Khushabi =

Sufi Saint of Qadiriyya Order in 16th Century

- Born: Pakpattan
- Burial place: Khushab
- Era: 16th Century
- Predecessor: Shah Mubarak Haqani
- Successor: Shah Sulaimān Nūri
- Father: Sheikh Adam
- Family: From Family of Fareed uddin Ganj Shakar and Ameer ul Momineen Umar Farooq

Makhdoom Shah Maroof Khushabi was a Sufi saint and preacher of the Qadiriyya Silsila order. He was the successor of Shah Mubarak Haqani (From Uch Sharif). He was a member of the Chishti Order (due to his father Shiekh Adam) and the Qadiriyya order (due to his spiritual leader Shah Mubarak Haqani).

== Early education and childhood ==
Shah Maroof Khushabi was born in Pakpattan. His father's name was Shiekh Adam. He got his early education from his father Sheikh Adam.

== Parents and family background ==
His family lineage goes to Fariduddin Ganjshakar, Ibrahim ibn Adham and Ameer ul Momineen Umar e Farooq.

== Allegiance to Shah Mubarak And Silsila e Qadriyya ==
In 908 Hijri, Shah Mubarak Haqani came to the forest near Khushab. People heard that a friend of Allah has come to the jungle but they did not dare to go there. Shah Maroof also listened and went to his place. Shah Mubarak was in meditation when Shah Maroof arrived. Shah Mubarak warned him not to come but he approached nevertheless. He became unconscious when he came near to him. After 3 days he regained consciousness again. Shah Mubrakak was impressed by him. So he made him his successor, linking him to Silsila e Qadiria.

== Spiritual lineage ==
He got his spiritual teachings from Shah Mubarak Haqani.

He belonged to Silsila e Qadriyya as below:

- Muhammad
- Ali
- Hasan al-Basri
- Habib al-Ajami
- Dawud Tai
- Maruf Karkhi
- Sirri Saqti
- Junayd of Baghdad
- Abu Bakr Shibli
- Abdul Aziz bin Hars bin Asad Yemeni Tamimi
- Abu Al Fazal Abdul Wahid Yemeni Tamimi
- Mohammad Yousuf Abu al-Farah Tartusi
- Abul Hasan Hankari
- Abu Saeed Mubarak Makhzoomi
- Abdul Qadir Gilani
- Syed Abdul Wahab Gilani
- Syed Abdul Salam Gilani
- Syed Ahmad Gilani
- Syed Masood Gilani
- Syed Ali Gilani
- Syed Shah Meer Gilani
- Shams Uddin Gilani
- Shah Muhamamd Ghoas Gilani
- Syed Mubarik Haqani
- Shah Maroof Khushabi

== Successors ==
His successor in Silsila e Qadiriyya and "Sajaada e Nasheen" was Sakhi Shah Suleman Noori Hazoori from Purana Bhalwal.

The following are his successors:

1. Shah Sulaimān Nūri Bhalwali
2. Sheikh Abdullah Qureshi
3. Syed Abdul Lateef
4. Shah Muhammad Sherazi Shahpuri
5. Sheikh Mehr Ali Ranjha

== Teachings and blessings ==
He travelled many places on the verdict of his "Murshid" and blessed everyone he met. He always remained in remembrance of Allah. At each place, the people gathered around him. He did not wanted to show himself but "it is impossible to hide a sun" so people always found him. It is said that many patients became fit on his one eyesight. Many non-Muslims became Muslim on his hand. He brought the message of Allah to Khushab

== Death ==
Shah Maroof Qadri Chisti Khushabi died on 10th Muharram 1579 in the era of Mughal king Jalal-uddin Mohammad Akbar. His feast is held every year on 9th and 10th Muharram.

== Shrine ==
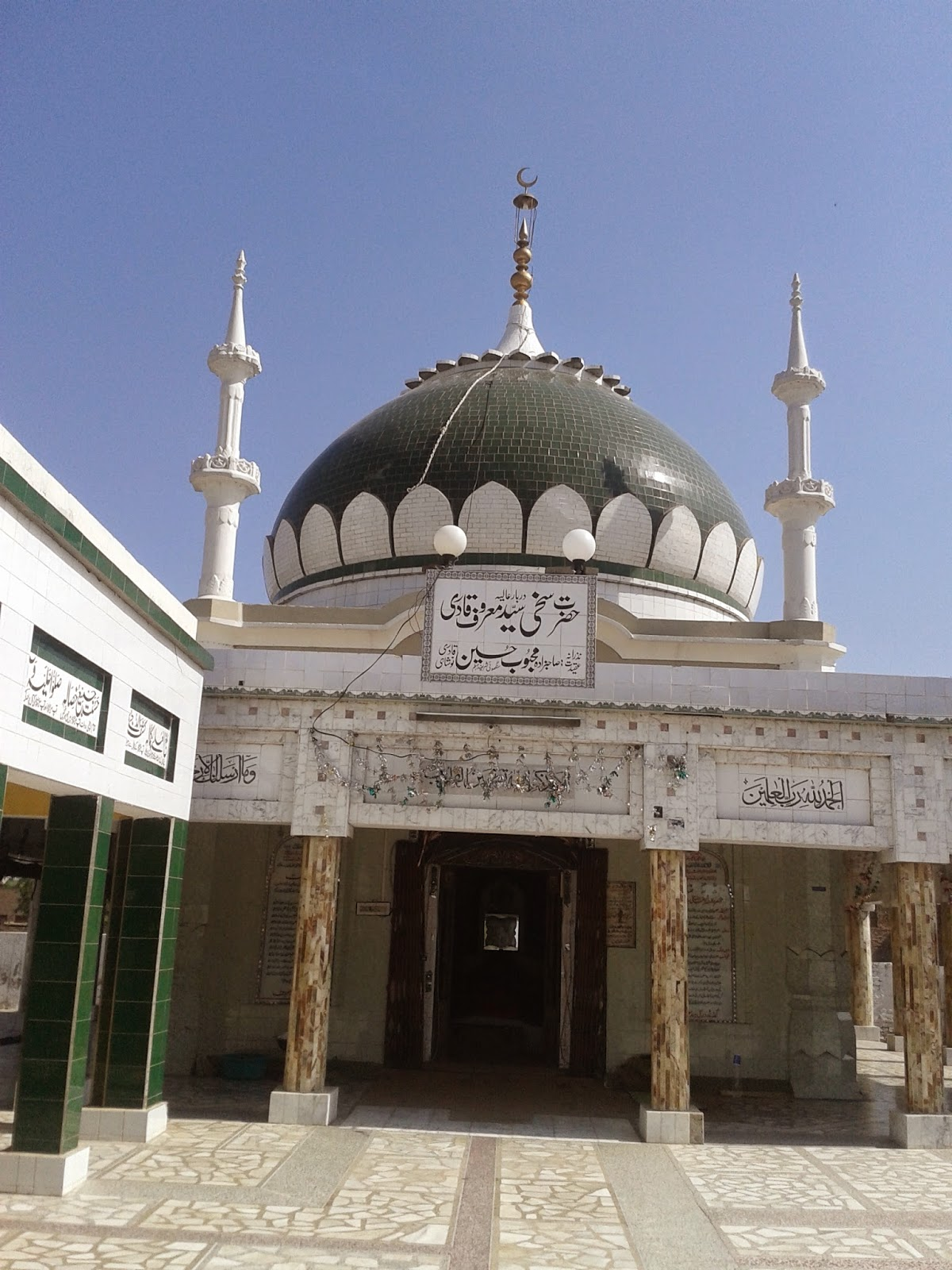
Darbar Shah Maroof Qadri Chisti

His shrine is situated in Khushab Sharif. It has a mosque with it.
