= Osman Nuri Topbaş =

Turkish Sufi master and author

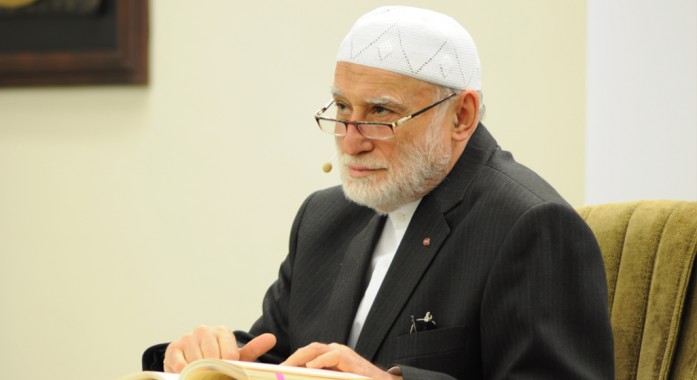

Personal life
- Born: 21 January 1942 (age 84) Erenköy, Kadıköy, Istanbul, Turkey
- Parents: Musa Topbaş (father); Fatma Feride Topbaş (mother)
- Main interest(s): Fiqh, Tafsir, Hadith, Sufism
- Website: en.osmannuritopbas.com

Religious life
- Religion: Islam
- Denomination: Sunni
- Jurisprudence: Hanafi
- Tariqa: Naqshbandi
- Creed: Maturidi

Muslim leader
- Influenced by: Rumi, Necip Fazıl Kısakürek

Osman Nuri Topbaş (born 1942) is a Turkish Sufi master and author. He is the spiritual leader of the Naqshbandi Sufi Order based in Kadıköy, Istanbul.

== Biography ==
He was born in 1942 in Kadıköy, Istanbul. His father is master Musa Topbaş, and his mother is the daughter of H. Fahri Kığılı, Mrs. Fatma Feride. He lives in Istanbul.

He is married and father of four children. His books are published online for free in 43 languages.

== Work ==
Some of his books have been translated into English:

- Islam: Spirit and Form
- Contemplation In Islam
- Prophet Muhammad Mustafa the Elect 1
- Prophet Muhammad Mustafa the Elect 2
- A Peacefulhome Paradise On Earth
- From The Examplary Manners Of The Friends Of Allah 1
- Tears of the Heart
- The Last Breath
- Muhammad: The Prophet of Mercy
- Hajj Mabrur And Umrah
- Principles from the Lives of the Four Rightly-Guided Caliphs
- Civilisation Of Virtues 1-2
- The Story of the Reed
- Ikhlas, Taqwa, Sincerity And Piety
- The Society Of The Age Of Bliss
- Sufısm
- The Exemplar Beyond Compare Muhammad Mustafa
- The Secret in the Love for God
- Endowment, Charity And Service In Islam
- Such a Mercy He Was
