= Chawa =

Residential town in Sargodha District, Punjab, Pakistan

- Village
- Location within Pakistan
- Coordinates: 30.59°N 72.54°E
- Country: Pakistan
- Province: Punjab
- District: Sargodha
- Elevation: 153 m (502 ft)

Population (2017 Pakistani census)
  - Total: 13,407
- Time zone: UTC+5 (PST)

Chawa is a village near the town of Bhera, in Sargodha District, Pakistan.

It is located at 30°59'0N 72°54'0E with an altitude of 153 metres (502 ft).

This village has 2,156 households with a population of 13, 407 per 2017 Pakistani census.
