= Galip Hassan Kuscuoglu =

Turkish mystic (1919–2013)

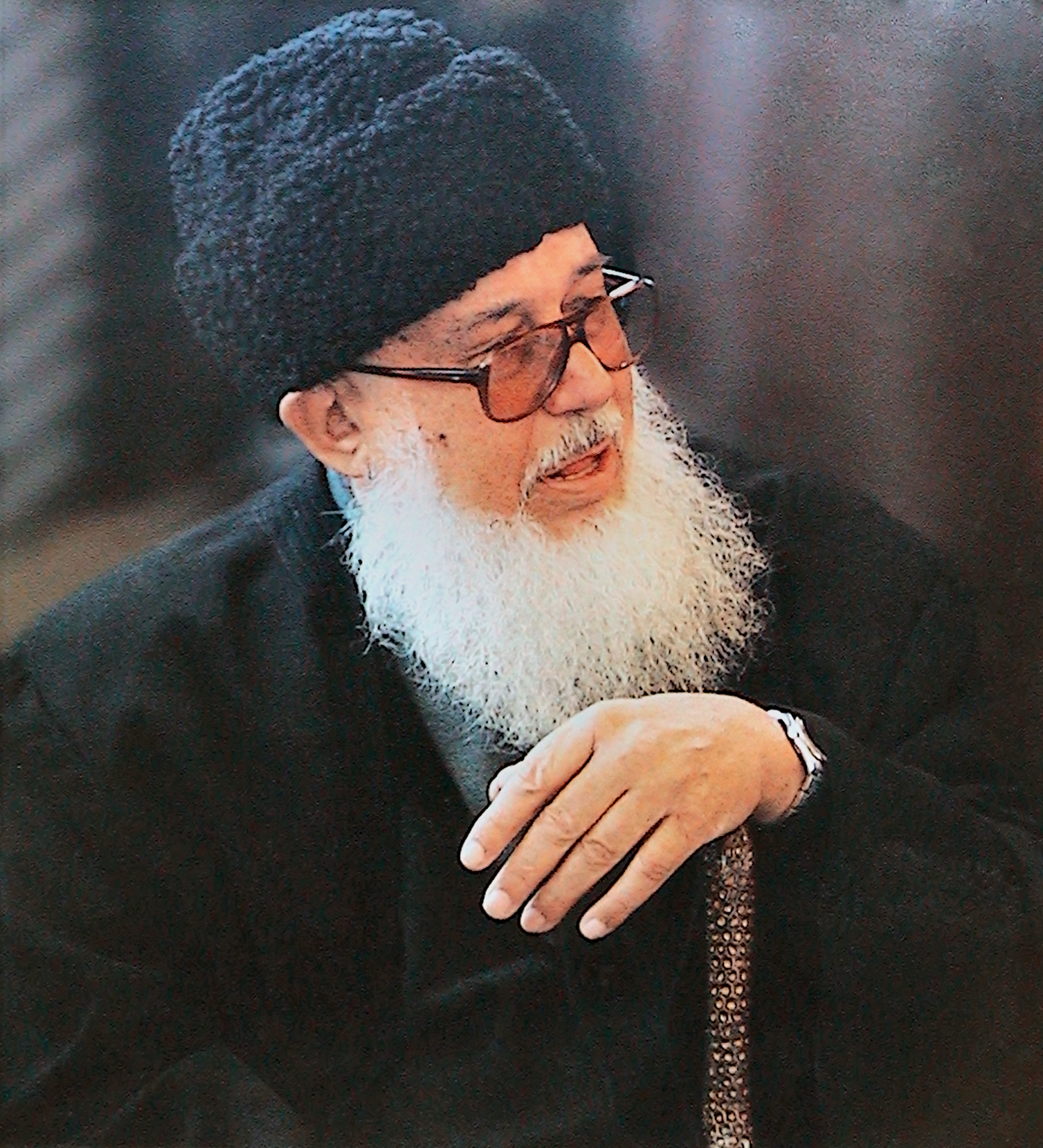
Sheikh Galip Hasan Kuşçuoğlu, 2007.

Galip Hasan Kuşçuoğlu (27 March 1919 – 14 December 2013) was the sheikh of Galibi Sufi order.

== His life ==
Kuşçuoğlu was born on 27 March 1919, in Çorum, Turkey. He is related to the famous Sage of Fatih Sultan Mehmet era, namely Ali Kuşçu who is a descendant of Caliph Omar. Galip Kuşçuoğlu has also kinship relation to the Islamic prophet Muhammad through his maternal kinship relation to Caliph Ali. He spent his childhood and adolescence in Çorum and Samsun. He dropped out of school as his father who was managing a hammam (bathhouse) in Çorum needed someone to help him. He realized that he was not tuned in to a life of immobility and left working with his father to be an apprentice to a carpenter. He soon became a carpenter and married the sole daughter of Sheikh Çorumlu Hacı Mustafa Anac who was the successor of Sheikh Ali Ahıskavî, the sheikh of his mother and father. He migrated to Çankırı and soon to Ankara in 1948. He gained an expertise in carpentry, and earned his family's keep by working as a famous craftsman and tradesman in the Carpenters' Bazaar in Ankara. He is also a founding member of the Ankara Carpenters Association (Ankara Marangozlar Derneği) and Ankara Carpentry Complex (Ankara Marangozlar Sitesi).

Sheikh Galib Kuşçuoğlu is the successor of Sheikh Hacı Mustafa Yardımedici who is, in turn, the successor of Seyyid Ali Sezai Kurtaran, who was the active leader of civil resistance against the French occupation forces and Armenian military forces in Maraş during the Turkish War of Independence. The meeting of Galip Kuşçuoğlu with his Sheikh Hacı Mustafa Yardımedici is very interesting. As Mr. Kuşçuoğlu narrates, this meeting occurred after a period of yearning and waiting for his unknown spiritual guide (Murshid).

The desire to search the truth, has occupied my life since my childhood. I could not apprehend some experiences that I had. They were incredible and unreasonable. These experiences directed me to tasawwuf. At the beginning I could not accept the necessity of a spiritual guide, because these experiences were incredible and immeasurable. But later on, I perceived the necessity of a guide in spiritual realm, just as it is necessary to be under control of a master in worldly crafts. Because I could not get anywhere... I personally experienced the impossibility of reaching to Allah out of His designation. Subsequently, I especially prayed Allah to make me meet my spiritual guide.

In 1949 he had sworn an oath of allegiance to the Qadiri and Rifai Shaikh Haji Mustafa Yardımedici, the caliph of Sayyid Shaikh Ali Sezai Kurtaran who is also known as "the Conqueror of Maraş". In 1956 on the Bara’ah night, he was given the spiritual guidance duty and became a sheikh after his own sheikh made it public.

In 1989 he was given the position (i.e. maqam) of al-ghawth al-a’zam during Umrah and in 1993 he announced that the title of Pir was given to him. He said Galibi Order is the 13th order in Muhammadian Sufism and is the only one branching out of the combination of Qadiri and Rufai orders.

During his last years, he gave two ratifications (i.e. ijazah) from his order to Master Haji Ali Yetkinşekerci on 15 March in 2011 in Antalya and to Master Haji Atıf Uzunömeroğlu on 19 January in 2012 in Istanbul.

He wrote the following books: “The Brotherhood We Need”, “Tasawwuf and the Dhikr of Allah”, “Metaphysics 1”, “Metaphysics 2”, “The Mercy Drops of Modern Age: From the Divine Compassion to the Divine Wisdom”, “Tasattur, Hijab and Adab in the Quran”, “The Handbook of Makarimul Akhlaaq (The Honorable Morals) and Al-Tariq al Mustaqim (The Straight Path) for Galibi Dervishes in Charge, and Islamic Tasawwuf Principles”, “The Hadj Guide” and “Erudite Remarks and Experiences Compiled from Ahl al Hal”. In his books and religious talks Kuşçuoğlu stressed the necessity of being contemporaneous. He adored technological advancement if used for the common good of humanity. He was for democracy and republicity. He was fond of Mustafa Kemal Ataturk in his mission of revolutionizing a backward country. He was for secularism and human rights if it means respecting religious rights as well. His religious perspective encompasses the whole humanity and unites them in believing in one omnipotent creator, Allah. He states that if one believes that there is no god but Allah, s/he is a muslim, according to the Quran. The sharias, religious laws that are sent down to David, Moses, Jesus and Muhammad are not separate religions like Judaism, Christianity and Islam. There is only one religion which is Islam and all the prophets are prophets of Islam. Those who follow the prophet Moses should be called Jewish Muslims; those who follow the prophet Jesus should be called Christian Muslims and those who follow the last prophet, Muhammad should be called Muhammadian Muslims only if they all believe in Allah. He emphasized the brotherhood of the ahl al kitaab (the People of the Book) and underlined the damage that has been inflected upon humanity due to the religious exclusivism.

Kuşçuoğlu died on 14 December 2013, in Antalya.
