= Maula Shah =

Punjabi poet and Sufi (1836–1944)

Sain Maula Shah
- Maula Bakhash (Maula Shah)
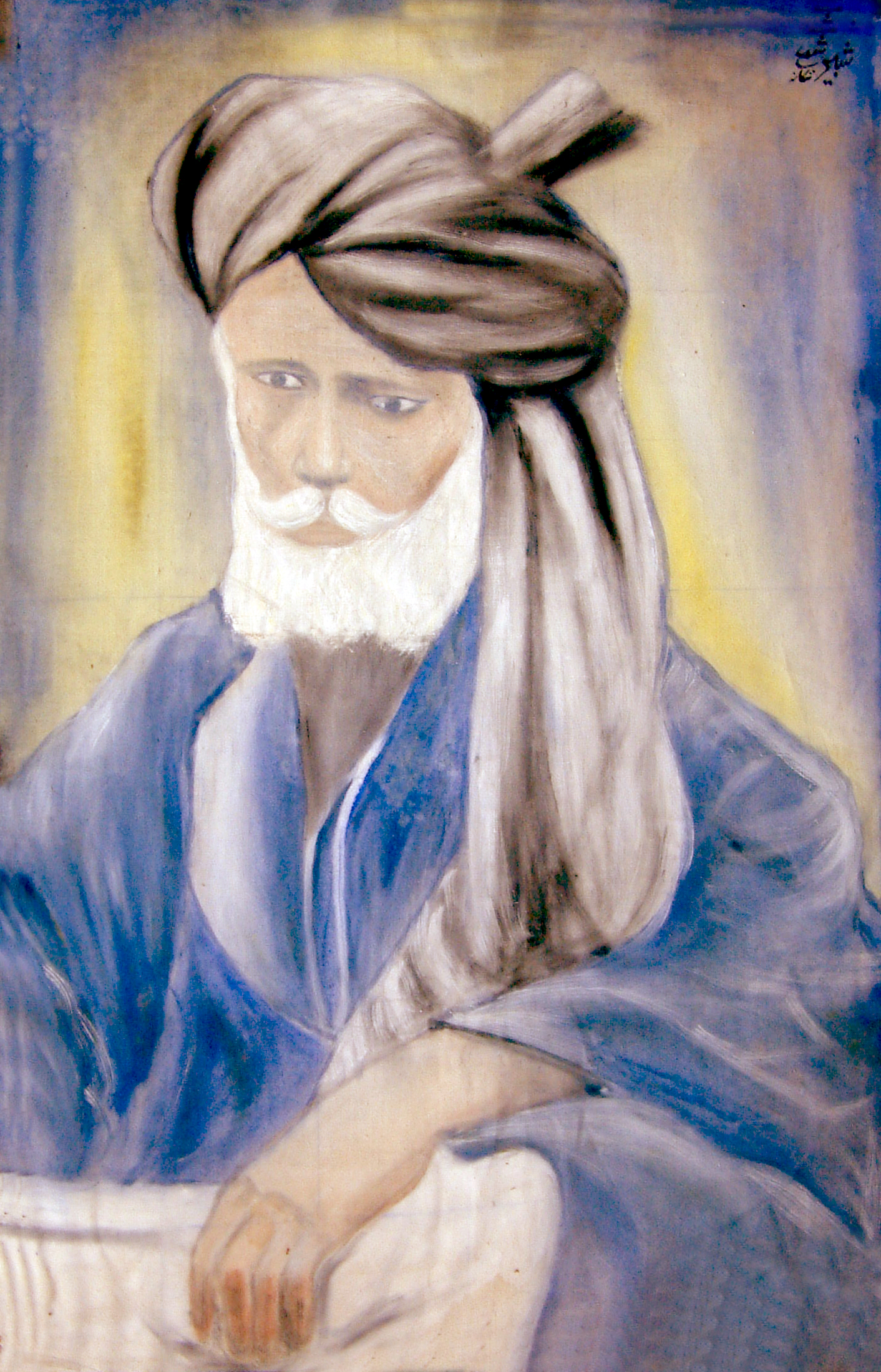
- Born: 1836; Majitha, Amritsar, India
- Died: 5 September 1944 (17 Ramadan 1369)
- Writing career
- Period: 20th Century
- Genres: Kafi; C Harfi; Athware; Folk Tales; Baran Mah
- Notable works: Zohra Mushtri; Sassi Punoo; Mirza Sahiban; Heer Ranjha; Bughamal Bishnoo; Chandar Badn; Dachi Maula Shah

Ecclesiastical career
- Religion: Sunni Islam

Maula Shah (Punjabi / Urdu :مولا شاہ رحمتہ اللہ علیہ / ਮੌਲਾ ਸ਼ਾਹ) (1836–1944) was a poet associated with Punjabi epic poems and folk tales. He later became a Muslim ascetic-Sufi and mystic poet. He wrote seven books of poetry. He was creator of great folk tales in Punjabi literature but his known books of poetry are Sassi Punnu, Bughamal Bishnoon, Mirza Sahibaan, Heer Ranjha, Zohra Mushtari and Chandar Badan.

== Early life ==
His birth name was Maula Bakhash. Based on his extreme struggle in Sufism, his "Murshid", or spiritual teacher, awarded him the name Maula Shah. Later he moved to Majitha in 1836. His father's name was Kareem Bakhash, who was a member of a Rajput tribe, Jandrah, which was associated with Kashmir.

During his youth, he briefly lived in Katra (Koucha) Bhagian as well as Katra Ghanaian of Amritsar. In old age he lived in Tibber District, Gurdaspur (India).

== Writing style ==
Maula Shah used verses in different styles known as Se Harfi & Kafi, Additionally, he was a sufi writer and had command in five languages Urdu, Punjabi, Persian, Arabic & English which he used in his writings

== Books ==
Maula Shah was a very prolific author. His books include:

1. Sat Ganj Aarsi
2. Sassi Punoo
3. Mirza Sahiban
4. Bughamal Bishnoo
5. Chandar Badn
6. Dachi Maula Shah
7. Guft Guftar
8. Latkeen Latkeen Aa Gaya
9. "Phir Guyyan Rutan"
10. "Roda Jalali"
11. "Shajrah Naushahian"
12. "Baran Imam"

=== Legacy ===
Maula Shah influenced many people, including;

1. Sain Haider Shah (Buried in Farooq Abad Distt. Sheikhupura)
2. Sufi Abdul Raheem Rahim
3. Muhammad Sharif Faisalabadi,
4. Muhammad Ismail Manzar,
5. Dr. Mian Zafar Maqbool
6. Babajan (mentor of mystic Meher Baba)

He also influenced woman Sufi saint, Babajan who died in 1931, who in turn became master of mystic Meher Baba.

== Death ==
He died on 6 September 1944 (i.e.17th Ramadan 1363 (A.H)). He was laid to rest in the back yard of his home.
