= Abdulhakim Arvasi =

Turkish Islamic scholar (1865–1943)

Abdulhâkim Arvâsî
- Born: 1865 in Arvas, Ottoman Empire
- Died: 1943 in Ankara, Turkey

Philosophical work
- Era: Modern Era
- Region: Islamic philosophy
- School: Sunni Islam

Abdulhâkim Arvâsî (Üçışık) or Sayyeed Abd al Haqeem-i Arvasi (1865–1943) was a Sunni Kurdish Islamic scholar.

== Life ==
Arvasi was born in the village of Arvas (present-day Doğanyayla) near Bahçesaray.

Arvasi lived in the times of the late Ottoman Empire and the early Republic of Turkey. He was a profound Islamic scholar of his time. Arvasi was a descendant of the Islamic prophet, Muhammad, and hence he had the title Sayyid before his name. He is the 33rd sheikh of the Naqshbandi order. He was born in present-day Van Province, Turkey. He received religious education from the famous scholar and walî Seyyid Fehim-i Arvasi. He was deeply learned in many worldly and religious sciences such as: natural sciences, hadith, tafsir and tasawwuf. Arvasi taught in Van for 30 years after which he moved to Istanbul as the Russian Army had invaded the eastern part of the country during the First World War. He called for a jihad or holy war to resist the Russian invasion and he also later advocated for unity between Turks and Kurds during the years of the Republic of Turkey. Arvasi taught in various madrasas and mosques of Istanbul for many years. One of his most famous students was Necip Fazıl Kısakürek. Arvasi died in Ankara in 1943 after decades of teaching of Islam. He is buried in Baglum Cemetery, Ankara.

== Works ==
- Er-Riyâd-üt-Tasavufiyye
- Râbita-i Şerîfe
- Keşkül
- Sefer-i Âhiret
- Eshâb-i Kirâm
- Ecdâd-i Pêxemberî

== Bibliography ==
- O ve Ben p. (in Turkish)
- Hal Tercümesi (in Turkish)
