= Nahid Angha =

Iranian-American Sufi author and lecturer

- Occupations: Scholar, activist, lecturer, translator, and author

Nahid Angha is an Iranian-American Sufi scholar, author, lecturer and human rights activist, with a focus on women's rights. She is the co-director and co-founder of the International Association of Sufism (IAS), founder of the International Sufi Women Organization, the executive editor of Sufism: An Inquiry. Nahid Angha is the main representative of the IAS to the United Nations (for Non Governmental Organization with the Department of Public Information: NGO/DPI).

== Biography ==
Nahid Angha is the daughter of Persian Sufi master Moulana Shah Maghsoud Sadiq Angha the Sufi master of the Uwaiysi lineage. Her mother, Mah Talat Etemad Moghadam, was from a prominent Persian family, and a descendant of Etemad Saltaneh. Angha pursued academic studies at the University of Tehran, Missouri State University, and University of Exeter. She holds doctorate degrees in Psychology and Islamic Studies, and taught as adjunct professor at the Dominican University of California and California Institute of Integral Studies. She created the Building Bridges of Understanding series program with the Dominican University of California that hosted many prominent speakers including the Iranian Nobel Prize winner, Shirin Ebadi.

== Selected publications ==
- Shah Maghsoud: Life and Legacy (California: IAS Publications, 2021).
- "Abdullah Ansari of Hirat" in Encyclopaedia of Islam, Three (2019).
- Shah Maghsoud. Nirvan. Translation with Commentary (California: International Association of Sufism Publications, 1992, second edition 2021).
- A Force Such as the World Has Never Known: Women Creating Change (co-author, co edited; Canada: INANNA Publications and Education, Inc. 2013).
- Mir Ghotbeddin Muhammad Angha, Destination: Eternity: az janin ta janan, Translation (California: IAS Publications, 1984, second edition 2022).
- Caravan: Biographies from Sufism Symposia 1994-2014 (California : IAS Publications, 2015; second edition 2022).
- Ansari, Abdullah. ‘Abdu’llāh Ansāri of Herāt, Stations of the Sufi Path: The One Hundred Fields: Sad Maydān (Cambridge: Archetype, 2010).
- Ecstasy: The World of Sufi Poetry and Prayer (California: IAS Publications, 2007).
- Sufism: The Journey of the Lovers (California: IAS Publications, 1998).
- Principles of Sufism (California: Asian Humanities Press, 1994).
- Shah Maghsoud, Psalms of Gods: Avaz-i Khodayan, Payam-I dill: A Meditation, translation with commentary (California: IAS Publications, 1991).
- The Journey: Seyr va Soluk (California: IAS, 1991).
- Selections: Poems from Khayyam, Rumi, Hafiz, Shah Maghsoud (California: IAS Publications, 1991).
- Deliverance: Words of the Prophet (California: IAS Publications, 1991).
- The Nature of Miracle (California: IAS Publications, 1991).
- Shah Maghsoud. Diwan-I ghazal (California: IAS Publications, 1984).
- Shah Maghsoud, Manifestations of Thought (Padidahay-i fikr) (California: Educational Testing & Research Institute Publications, 1980).
- Nagah. Tahshi’-i bar Padidehay-i fikr. Tehran: Maktab-e-tariqat-e-Oveyssi Shah Maghsoudi, 1979).
