= Tariqa =

Order of Sufism

A tariqa (Arabic: طريقة, romanized: ṭarīqa) is a religious order of Sufism, or specifically a concept for the mystical teaching and spiritual practices of such an order with the aim of seeking haqiqa, which translates as "ultimate truth".

A tariqa has a murshid (guide) who plays the role of leader or spiritual director. The members or followers of a tariqa are known as muridin (singular murid), meaning "desirous", viz. "desiring the knowledge of God and loving God" (also called a faqir). The murshid of the tariqa is also believed to be the same as the tzadik of Judaism, meaning the "rightly guided one".

The metaphor of "way, path" is to be understood in connection of the term sharia which also has the meaning of "path", more specifically "well-trodden path; path to the waterhole". The "path" metaphor of tariqa is that of a further path, taken by the mystic, which continues from the "well-trodden path" or exoteric of sharia towards the esoteric haqiqa. A fourth "station" following the succession of shariah, tariqa and haqiqa is called marifa. This is the "unseen center" of haqiqa, and the ultimate aim of the mystic, corresponding to the unio mystica in Western mysticism. Tasawwuf, an Arabic word that refers to Islamic mysticism, is known in the West as Sufism.

== Orders of Sufism ==
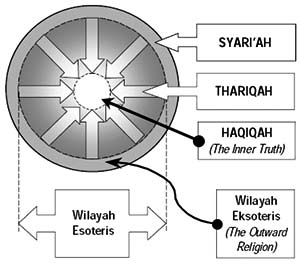
"Tariqat" in the Four Spiritual Stations: The Four Stations are Sharia, Ṭarīqah, Haqiqa, and the fourth station marifa, which is considered "unseen" and actually located at the center of the haqiqa region. It is the essence of all four stations.

The most popular tariqa in the West is the Mevlevi Order, named after Jalal ad-Din Muhammad Rumi. In the same time the Bektashi Order was also founded, named after the Haji Bektash Veli. The four most significant tariqas in South Asia are the Qadiri Order, named after Abdul Qadir Gilani, the Chishti Order, named after Abu Ishaq Shami Chishti, the Naqshbandi Order, named after Baha' al-Din Naqshband and the Mujaddidi Order, named after Ahmed Sirhindi. Others include the Rishi order founded by Nund Rishi in Kashmir and the Suhrawardi Order, named after Shihab al-Din 'Umar al-Suhrawardi, and the Burhaniyya Order. Large tariqats in Africa include Muridiyya, Rifa'iyya and Tijaniyya. Sufi orders can have sub-orders within them, such as the Ashrafiyya, named after the 13th century illustrious Sufi saint Ashraf Jahangir Semnani is a sub-order of Chishti spiritual lineage, the Maizbhandariyya, which is a Sufi sub-order established in the Bangladesh in the 19th century by the Shah Sufi Syed Ahmadullah Maizbhandari (1826 AD − 1906 AD), 27th generation descendant of the Islamic prophet, Muhammad, and the Warisi sub-order, which was founded by Waris Ali Shah. Another South Asian Sufi tradition is Nisbat-e-Rasooli, established by Pir Nazeer Ahmed of Mohra Sharif. It traces its spiritual lineage to the Naqshbandi Order and Mujaddidi Order while emphasizing devotion and spiritual attachment (nisbat) to the Prophet Muhammad as a central element of its teachings. The Nisbat-e-Rasooli tradition describes its tariqa as emphasizing spiritual attachment (nisbat) to the Prophet Muhammad through adherence to the Quran, the Sunnah, and ethical conduct. Pir Gul Badshah characterized this relationship as central to the spiritual development of the individual.

Membership in a particular Sufi order is not exclusive, unlike the Christian monastic orders which are demarcated by firm lines of authority and sacrament. Sufis often are members of various Sufi orders. The non-exclusiveness of Sufi orders has consequences for the social extension of Sufism. They cannot be regarded as indulging in a zero sum competition which a purely political analysis might have suggested. Rather, their joint effect is to impart to Sufism a cumulant body of tradition, rather than individual and isolated experiences.

In most cases the sheikh nominates his khalifa or "successor" during his lifetime, who will take over the order. In rare cases, if the sheikh dies without naming a khalifa, the students of the tariqa elect another spiritual leader by vote. In some orders it is recommended to take a Khalif from the same order as the murshid. In some groups it is customary for the khalifa to be the son of the sheikh, although in other groups the khalīfa and the sheikh are not normally relatives. In yet other orders a successor may be identified through the spiritual dreams of its members.

Tariqat have silsilats (Arabic: سلسلة; "chain, lineage of sheikhs"). All orders claim a silsila that leads back to Muhammad through Ali, except the Naqshbandi silsila, which traces its roots to Abu Bakr, the first Caliph of Sunni Islam.

Every Murid, on entering the tariqa, gets his awrad, or daily recitations, authorized by his murshid (usually to be recited before or after the pre-dawn prayer, after the afternoon prayer and after the evening prayer). Usually these recitations are extensive and time-consuming (for example the awrad may consist of reciting a certain formula 99, 500 or even 1000 times). One must also be in a state of ritual purity (as one is for the obligatory prayers to perform them while facing Mecca). The recitations change as a student (murid) moves from a mere initiate to other Sufi degrees (usually requiring additional initiations). The Initiation ceremony is routine and consists of reading chapter 1 of the Quran followed by a single phrase prayer. Criteria have to be met to be promoted in rank: the common way is to repeat a single phrase prayer 82,000 times or more as in the case of Burhaniyya, a number that grows with each achieved rank. Murids who experience unusual interaction during meditation: hear voices like "would you like to see a prophet?" or see visions who might even communicate with the Murid are held dear in the "Haḍra", the weekly group-chanting of prayers in attempt of reaching spirits as they are likely to experience something unusual and pass it on. This Murid is promoted faster than others. The least common way is to cause a miracle to happen with criteria similar to that of Catholic Sainthood.

Being mostly followers of the spiritual traditions of Islam loosely referred to as Sufism, these groups were sometimes distinct from the Ulema or officially mandated scholars, and often acted as informal missionaries of Islam. They provided accepted avenues for emotional expressions of faith, and the Tariqas spread to all corners of the Muslim world, and often exercised a degree of political influence inordinate to their size (take for example the influence that the sheikhs of the Safavid had over the armies of Tamerlane, or the missionary work of Ali-Shir Nava'i in Turkistan among the Mongol and Tatar people).

== History ==
The tariqas were particularly influential in the spread of Islam in the sub-Sahara during the 9th to 14th centuries, where they spread south along trade routes between North Africa and the sub-Saharan kingdoms of Ghana and Mali. On the West African coast they set up Zawiyas on the shores of the river Niger and even established independent kingdoms such as al-Murabitun or Almoravids. The Al Hakika Mizaan Mizaani Sufi order deals with heavy internalization and meditations, their spiritual practice is called Al Qudra Mizaan. The Sanusi order was also highly involved in missionary work in Africa during the 19th century, spreading both Islam and a high level of literacy into Africa as far south as Lake Chad and beyond by setting up a network of zawiyas where Islam was taught.

Much of Central Asia and southern Russia was won over to Islam through the missionary work of the Tarīqahs, and the majority of Indonesia's population, where a Muslim army never set foot, was converted to Islam by the perseverance of both Muslim traders and Sufi missionaries. Sufism in India played a similarly crucial role in the diffusion of Islam at the élite and popular levels; its music, art, and poetry flourished in a highly sophisticated Persianate society.

Tariqas were brought to China in the 17th century by Ma Laichi and other Chinese Sufis who had studied in Mecca and Yemen, and had also been influenced by spiritual descendants of the Kashgarian Sufi master Afaq Khoja. On the Chinese soil the institutions became known as menhuan, and are typically headquartered near the tombs (gongbei) of their founders.

== See also ==
- Dargah
- Dervish
- Khanqah
- Zawiya (institution)
- Noble Eightfold Path
- Sampradaya, a similar concept in Indian Religions

== Bibliography ==
- J. M. Abun-Nasr, "The Tijaniyya", London 1965
- M. Berger, "Islam in Egypt today - social and political aspects of popular religion", London, 1970
- J. K. Birge, "The Bektashi Order of Dervishes", London and Hartford, 1937
- Clayer, Nathalie, Muslim Brotherhood Networks, EGO - European History Online, Mainz: Institute of European History, 2011, retrieved: May 23, 2011.
- O. Depont and X. Coppolani, "Les confreries religieuses musulmans" (the Muslim brotherhoods as they existed then), Algiers, 1897
- E. E. Evans-Pritchard, "The Sanusi of Cyrenaica", Oxford, 1949
- M. D. Gilsenen, "Saint and Sufi in Modern Egypt", Oxford, 1978
- G. H. Jansen, "Militant Islam", Pan, London 1979
- F. de Jong, "Turuq and Turuq-Linked Institutions in Nineteenth-Century Egypt", Brill, Leiden,1978
- J. W. McPherson, "The Moulids of Egypt", Cairo, 1941
- Mateus Soares de Azevedo, "Ordens Sufis no Islã: Iniciação às Confrarias Esotéricas muçulmanas no Irã xiita e no mundo sunita", São Paulo, Polar Editora, 2020
