= Nisbat-e-Rasooli =

Nisbat-e-Rasooli (Urdu: نسبت رسولی) is the name given to the Naqshbandia Mujaddidia Sufi order of Islam by Pir Nazeer Ahmed. It traces its spiritual lineage to the Naqshbandi Order while emphasizing devotion and spiritual attachment (nisbat) to the Prophet Muhammad (PBUH) as a central element of its teachings

== History ==
Nisbat-e-Rasooli formerly originated after the death of Muhammad Qasim Sadiq in 1943. According to the followers of the order, Muhammad Qasim Sadiq publicly appointed his eldest son Pir Nazeer Ahmed his successor in 1925; however, familial disputes arose after his death and the order at Mohra Sharif Murree split into two, Qasmia order and Nisbat-e-Rasooli. Pir Nazeer Ahmed later renamed the order to Nisbat-e-Rasooli for the reason mentioned above. Pir Nazeer Ahmed led the order till his death on 22 July 1960. He appointed his son Pir Gul Badshah his successor in Mohra Sharif. Pir Mujtaba Farooq Gul Badshah is the current Sajjada Nashin, Successor and Chief Custodian of Mohra Sharif Rawalpindi..

== Ideology ==
The founder of the order Pir Nazeer Ahmed described the ideology of the order to be that a "Real example of following the Prophet Muhammad can be found in his companions, most notably the first four Caliphs. And that is where every Muslim shall try to be at. With the passage of time, different variations start appearing that can be exemplified as when you throw a stone in the water. Stone being at the center creates ripples that spread in circles around it and keep on moving further away. All these variations are like those ripple currents that although centered around the stone, are in fact away from it. We want to put our focus on the stone (center) rather than getting bogged by the ripples. This is why we call our order Nisbat-e-Rasooli. Anyone may claim to have a spiritual attachment to the Prophet Muhammad (PBUH), but the practical proof is that for such a person nothing is more beloved than the love of Allah and His Messenger (PBUH). Such a person is always ready for every sacrifice, and every sacrifice becomes a source of happiness and inner peace for him.

== Religious festivals ==
Twice a year public religious congregations are announced and held in Mohra Sharif to commemorate its leaders and their teachings. The first meeting is held around early June to commemorate the founder of the order, Pir Nazeer Ahmed, Pir Gul Badshah, and Abdul Qadir Gilani. Every year on 25th of Jan a congregation open to the public, is held for Quran recitation on the death anniversary of Pir Farooq Gul Badshah and Pir Nazeer Ahmed respectively. The second annual Urs meeting is held around early November in commemoration of Pir Muhammad Qasim under the headship of current custoadian Pir Mujtaba Farooq Gul Badshah of Mohra Sharif Rawalpindi.

== Publications and Media ==
Mohra Sharif maintains an online library containing books and discourses concerning the teachings and spiritual lineage associated with Nisbat-e-Rasooli. The tradition has also been represented through online television and video programming
