= Muhammad Qasim Sadiq =

Islamic Scholar (1845-1942)

Pir Khawaja Qasim Sadiq Mohravi
- Muhammad Qasim Sadiq

Custodian of Mohra Sharif
- In office Unknown – 21 November 1943
- Preceded by: Position established

Personal life
- Born: 1845
- Died: 21 November 1942 (aged 96–97) Mohra Sharif
- Resting place: Mohra Sharif

Religious life
- Religion: Islam

Muhammad Qasim Sadiq, commonly known as Baba Ji Sarkar (1845–November 21, 1943), was a Sufi sheikh and acclaimed saint who died in the town of Mohra Sharif. In 1878 he founded Mohra Sharif which he established as a centre of Islamic learning and spiritual instruction that later developed into a religious institution in the region. Anthropologist Pnina Werbner identifies Pir Muhammad Qasim as the murshid of the Naqshbandi saint Zindapir and describes him as the Saint of Mohra Sharif. That is where his Urs is held in the month of November, annually.

He had completed his study in several Islamic disciplines by the age of twenty. He committed himself to praying and teaching the religion of Islam after completing his studies.

== Successors and Legacy ==
In 1925, Muhammad Qasim Sadiq appointed Pir Nazeer Ahmed as his spiritual successor. Under subsequent custodians, the religious activities associated with Mohra Sharif continued and the institution remained centre of Islamic teaching and Sufi practice. In later decades, it expanded to various cities like in Rawalpindi etc. through affiliated khanqahs and spiritual centres, while distinct traditions associated with the Qasimia and Nisbat-e-Rasooli lineages developed under different successors.

== Successors and legacy ==
In 1925, Sadiq appointed Pir Nazeer Ahmed as his spiritual successor. Under subsequent custodians, the religious activities associated with Mohra Sharif continued and the institution remained a centre of Islamic teaching and Sufi practice. In later decades, it expanded to various cities like in Rawalpindi etc. through affiliated khanqahs and spiritual centres, while distinct traditions associated with the Qasimia and Nisbat-e-Rasooli lineages developed under different successors.
