= Pir Nazeer Ahmed =

Nazeer Ahmed

1st Leader of Nisbat-e-Rasooli
- In office November 1943 – July 22nd, 1960
- Preceded by: Muhammad Qasim Sadiq
- Succeeded by: Pir Gul Badshah

Personal details
- Born: Mohra Sharif, British Raj
- Died: July 22, 1960 Combined Military Hospital Rawalpindi
- Children: Mubarak Khan, Pir Gul Badshah, Haroon al Rasheed

Pir Nazeer Ahmed (1800–22 July 1960) was an Indian Islamic scholar and Sufi saint. He was the eldest son of Muhammad Qasim Sadiq, founder of Mohra Sharif.

== Early life and education ==
Ahmed was born in 1880.

His education started at an early age. Because formal schooling was not available in the area, various scholars were invited to Mohra Sharif to teach him Persian, Urdu, Islamic Studies, Arabic, Sarf, Nahv, Hadith, Fiqh and other traditional subjects. Along with these, he was also trained in riding, swordsmanship and lancing.

In 1892, when he was 12 years of age, his father Muhammad Qasim Sadiq took him to Kahyian Sharif to meet with Khwaja Nizam ad Din. During his first meeting with the Sheikh, Ahmed was given the Khilafat by Khwaja Nizam ad Din said to Ahmed:

your 7 posterities will be Sufi saints and Ahmed will be his heir and Ahmed will be Mujaddid of his era.

== Career ==
After returning from Kahiyan Sharif, he again went back to his studies and after sometime went into solitude in the neighboring Jungle. This routine, he continued for twelve years. During this time, he was married and his eldest son Mubarak Khan was born. Because his inclination was more towards solitude, the marriage did not work out and in 1906 he separated from his wife.

In the meantime, he continued his education and Maulvi Ghulam Muhammad of Dandot stayed at Mohra Sharif for a year to teach him the complex matters of Islamic studies. Later two scholars Maulana Ghulam Kibriya Khan of Bihar and Maulana Abd ar Rehman stayed at Mohra Sharif and completed his formal education.
