= Mohra Sharif =

Village in Punjab, Pakistan

- Location within Pakistan

Religion
- Region: Punjab, Pakistan

Location
- Location: Rawalpindi, near Islamabad

Architecture
- Established: 19th century

Mohra Sharif Rawalpindi is a Sufi shrine in Rawalpindi Punjab province of Pakistan. Founded by Muhammad Qasim Sadiq. Pir Mujtaba Farooq Gul Badshah is the current Sajjada Nashin, Successor and Chief Custodian of Mohra Sharif Rawalpindi.

In January 2026, the German Ambassador to Pakistan Ina Lepel visited the shrine.
