= International Islamic Unity Conference (US) =

- Genre: Religious conference
- Venue: Westin Bonaventure Hotel (1996); Omni Shoreham Hotel (1998)
- Locations: Los Angeles (1996); Washington, D.C. (1998)
- Country: United States
- Inaugurated: August 2, 1996
- Most recent: August 9, 1998
- Organizer: As-Sunnah Foundation of America (1996); Islamic Supreme Council of America (1998)

The First and Second International Islamic Unity Conference were conferences organized by followers of the Naqshbandi Haqqani Sufi Order in Los Angeles (1996) and Washington DC (1998). Sufi and Sufi-friendly Muslim representatives, Islamic scholars and politicians were invited to the conferences. The conferences exemplified the Haqqani-Naqshbandis' ambitions to establish itself as a major player within the American Muslim scene. The conference was supported in part by members of royalty, Muslim political and religious leaders from across the world.

== First International Unity Conference ==
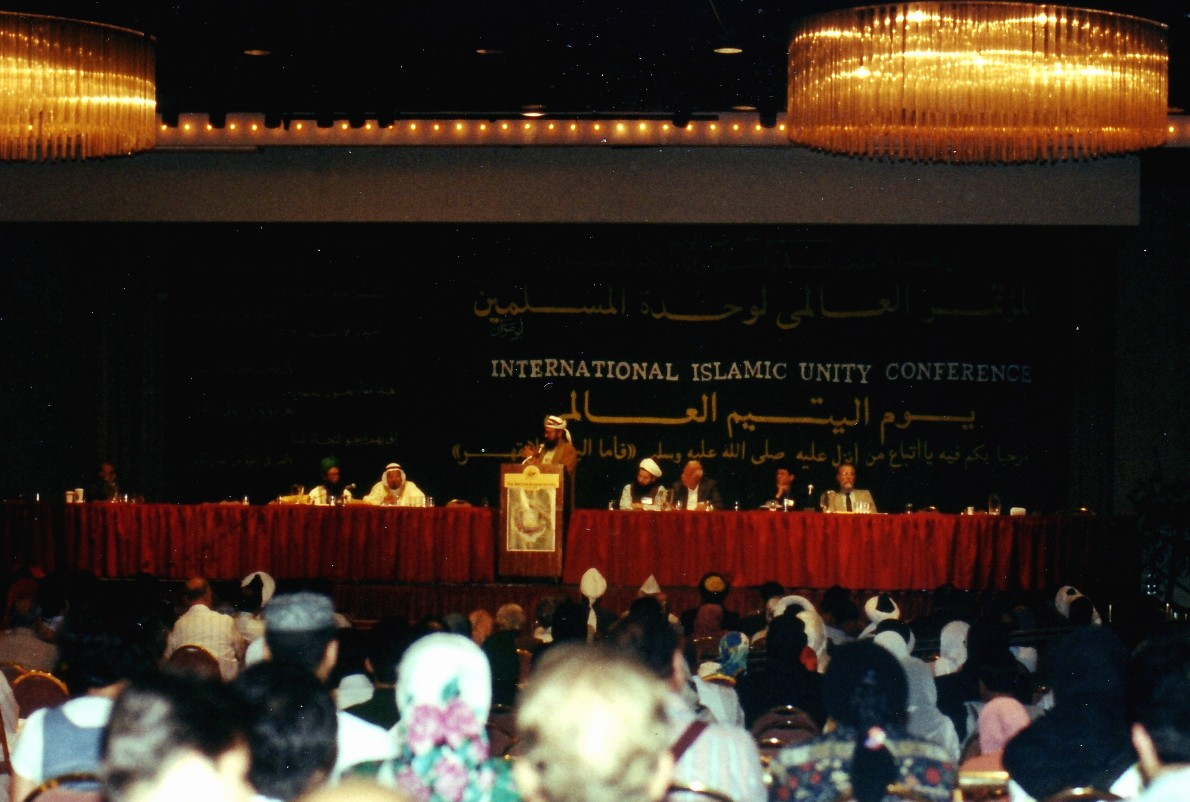
Speakers at a panel discussion during the 1996 conference in Los Angeles.

The Los Angeles conference was from August 2 through the 4th, 1996, some 7,000 attendees and over 125 speakers from around the globe attended a three-day marathon of lectures, parallel workshop sessions, prayer, praise of Muhammad and Islamic social interaction. Officially known as the International Islamic Unity Conference, it started off with a press session on Friday morning and ended with a parade through downtown Los Angeles on Sunday evening. Attendees praised the organizers for an excellent, though intense schedule of speeches by muftis, Islamic scholars, international political leaders, American political figures and an array of interfaith events.

Chaired by Shaykh Muhammad Hisham Kabbani, the conference was sponsored by As-Sunnah Foundation of America, the Naqshbandi Haqqani Sufi Order and by a number of other charitable and religious organizations.

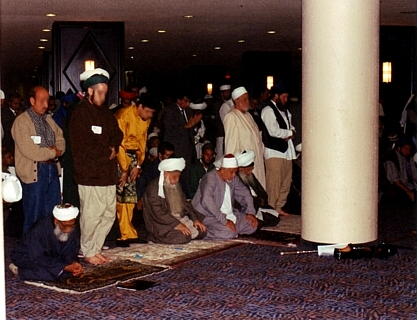
Shaykh Kabbani and Nazim al-Haqqani in prayer with others at the Los Angeles conference.

Many felt the conference organization was exemplary, the facilities at the Los Angeles' Westin Bonaventure Hotel excellent and the wide variety of cultural food and Islamic entertainment very apropos for such an international event. The many San Francisco Bay Area attendees were happy to find a number of prominent local Islamic activists featured, as well as those from national ISNA, IQRA, MPAC and other national Islamic organizations well represented.

The spirit of unity was especially apparent at the "Peace in the Streets" session, where about 20 former gang leaders, along with the popular rap star MC Hammer, took shahada with Shaykh Nazim al-Qubrusi, Grand-mufti of Cyprus and worldwide leader of the Naqshbandi Haqqani Sufi Order.

Attendees were treated to sessions on politics, importance of schools of thought, purification of the heart, establishing Islamic economic power, educational curriculum initiative and many other subjects, discussed from the main podium as well as in intimate workshops where speakers and attendees were able to express their views. A major event occurred on Saturday night, with the launching of the International Day of the Orphan, which is expected, given the sponsorship of California's Assembly, and endorsement by a number of international organizations, to become a globally sponsored day for recalling the plight of orphans and children in difficulty.

== Second International Unity Conference ==
The Second International Unity Conference was held in August 1998 in Washington D.C. The second conference was sponsored by the newly formed Islamic Supreme Council of America and again chaired by Shaykh Kabbani. Islamic world unity was the theme of the second conference, however topics related to both domestic and political issues were also on the agenda.

== See also ==
- As-Sunnah Foundation of America
- Islamic Supreme Council of America
