= As-Sunnah Foundation of America =

Sufi Islamic Organization of America

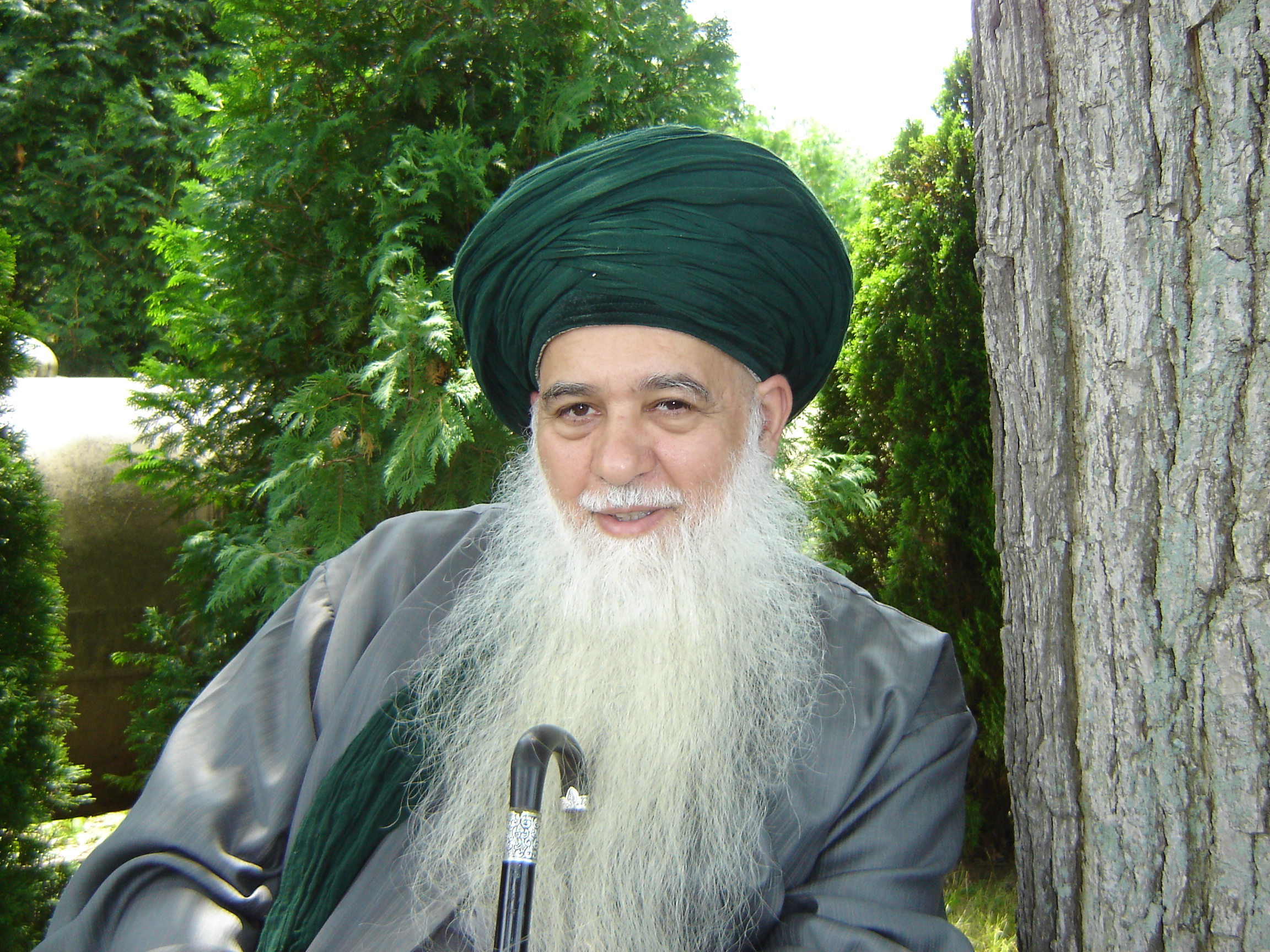
- Sheikh Hisham Kabbani founder of As-Sunnah foundation of America

Founder
- Hisham Kabbani

Religions
- Islam

Scriptures
- Quran, Hadith and Sunnat; Jurisprudence: Hanafi

As-Sunnah Foundation of America (ASFA) is an educational organization that works for the unity of the Islamic faith in the United States, founded and chaired by Hisham Kabbani. Founded in 1997, together with the Islamic Supreme Council of America (ISCA), the ASFA has close connections to Kabbani's Naqshbandi Haqqani Sufi Order. The ASFA is said be a main organization of Nakshbandi Sufi order in America.

Kabbani's sunnah.org website is mentioned in the article "Sufi Charisma on the Internet" by Garbi Schmidt (2004).

== Affiliation ==
As-Sunnah foundation of America is affiliated to Islamic Supreme Council of America(ICSA).

== Aims ==
As-Sunnah Foundation has its offices in Indonesia, Pakistan, England, Germany and Malaysia and its headquarters in United States.

The website of this organization aims to provide non-chargeable Islamic education, information on various Islamic events, publications, Q&A, prayer resources and fatwa.

== Publications ==
ASFA has published a number of traditionalist books, primarily authored by founder, Shaykh Kabbani, or translated from traditional sources by protégé, Dr. Gibril Fouad Haddad. Published titles include:

- Kabbani, Shaykh Muhammad Hisham, Salafi Movement Unveiled, ASFA, 2000.
- Kabbani, Shaykh Muhammad Hisham, Encyclopedia of Islamic Doctrine, ISBN 1-871031-48-6, ASFA, 1998.
- Jamal Effendi al-`Iraqi al-Zahawi, The Doctrine of Ahl as-Sunna Versus the "Salafi" Movement, translated with notes by Shaykh Muhammad Hisham Kabbani, ASFA, 1996.
- Imam al-Bayhaqi, Allah's Names and Attributes (Al-Asma' wa al-Sifat), translated by Dr. Gibril Fouad Haddad, ASFA, 1998.
- al-Maliki, As-Sayyid Muhammad ibn Alawi, The Prophets in Barzakh; The Hadith of Isra' and Mi'raj, The Immense Merits of Al-Sham; The Vision of Allah, translated by Dr. Gibril Fouad Haddad, ASFA, 1998.
- Imam 'Izz ibn 'Abd al-Salam, Beliefs of the People of Islam (Aqa'id Ahl al-Islam), translated by Dr. Gibril Fouad Haddad, ASFA, 1998.
- Ibn Khafif, Correct Islamic Doctrine (Al-'Aqida al-Sahiha), Islamic Doctrine (Al-'Aqida Ahl al-Islam), translated by Dr. Gibril Fouad Haddad, ASFA, 1998.
- Kabbani, Shaykh Muhammad Hisham, Islamic Beliefs and Doctrine According to Ahl as-Sunna - A Repudiation of "Salafi" Innovations, ASFA, 1996.
- Kabbani, Shaykh Muhammad Hisham, Innovation and True Belief: the Celebration of Mawlid According to the Qur'an and Sunna and the Scholars of Islam, ASFA, 1995.
- al-Mani, Dr. Isa Humayri, MAWLID Its Permissibility, Its Necessity, Its Reality: Fatwa of Dubai Regarding Celebration of Mawlid an-Nabi, ASFA, 1997.
- Al-`allama Al-Shaykh Abdul Rahman Al-Sufuri Al-Shafi`i, Nuzhat Al-Majalis Wa Muntakhab Al-Nafa'is - Talks about Sincerity, Doctrine, Remembrance of God, and on the Night of Power, translated by Dr. Gibril Fouad Haddad, ASFA 1998.

== See also ==
- Naqshbandi Haqqani Sufi Order of America
- Islamic Supreme Council of America
- Sufi Muslim Council
