= Saint =

Recognition of a person as being holy

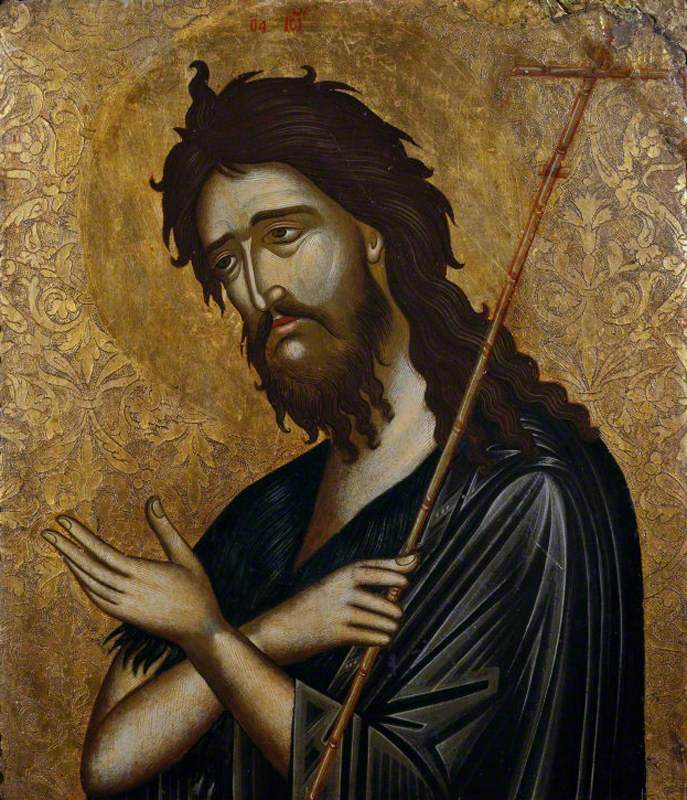
John the Baptist pictured with a halo. In Christian iconography, saints may also be depicted with wreaths, palm branches, white lilies and other attributes.

In Christian belief, a saint is a person who is recognized as having an exceptional degree of holiness, likeness, or closeness to God. However, the use of the term saint depends on the context and denomination. Official ecclesiastical recognition, and veneration, is conferred on some denominational saints through the process of canonization in the Catholic Church or glorification in the Eastern Orthodox Church after their approval. The saints are honored in the liturgical calendars of Evangelical Lutheranism and Anglicanism. In other nonconformist denominations, such as the Plymouth Brethren, and following from Pauline usage, saint refers broadly to any holy Christian without special recognition or selection.

While the English word saint (deriving from the Latin sanctus) originated in Christianity, historians of religion tend to use the appellation "in a more general way to refer to the state of special holiness that many religions attribute to certain people", referring to the Hindu rishi, Sikh bhagat or guru, the Shintoist kami, the Taoist immortal or zhenren, the Jewish tzadik, the Islamic walī/fakir, and the Buddhist arhat or bodhisattva also as saints. Depending on the religion, saints are recognized either by official declaration, as in Catholicism, Oriental Orthodoxy or Eastern Orthodoxy, or by popular acclamation (see folk saint).

== Etymology ==
The word saint derives from the Latin sanctus, meaning "holy" or "consecrated", and entered English through Old French seint and Middle English saint, retaining its meaning as a holy person and historically used to refer to individuals regarded as holy.

The word hallow is synonymous with saint, the former derived from the Old English hālig, the same root as "holy", and refers to holy individuals. It is preserved in certain names and traditions celebrating saints, such as Allhallowtide, a period that includes All Hallows' Eve (Halloween) and All Hallows' Day.

== General characteristics ==
The Greek equivalent of the Latin sanctus is ἅγιος (hagios) 'holy'. This Greek word appears 235 times in the Greek New Testament. The King James Version of the Bible translates 191 times (as 'holy' or 'Holy') and 61 times (as 'saints').

The word sanctus was originally a technical one in ancient Roman religion, but due to its globalized use in Christianity the modern word saint is now also used as a translation of comparable terms for persons "worthy of veneration for their holiness or sanctity" in other religions.

Many religions also use similar concepts (but different terminology) to venerate persons worthy of some honor. Author John A. Coleman of the Graduate Theological Union, Berkeley, California, wrote that saints across various cultures and religions have the following family resemblances:

1. exemplary model
2. extraordinary teacher
3. wonderworker or source of benevolent power
4. intercessor
5. a life often refusing material attachments or comforts
6. possession of a special and revelatory relation to the holy.

The anthropologist Lawrence Babb, in an article about Indian guru Sathya Sai Baba, asks the question "Who is a saint?" and responds by saying that in the symbolic infrastructure of some religions, there is the image of a certain extraordinary spiritual person's "miraculous powers", to whom frequently a certain moral presence is attributed. These saintly figures, he asserts, are "the focal points of spiritual force-fields". They exert "powerful attractive influence on followers but touch the inner lives of others in transforming ways as well".

== History ==
=== Old Testament ===
In the Hebrew Bible, English "saints" most often renders terms of holiness, especially the adjective qādôš ("set apart, consecrated, holy"), and in the plural it appears as "holy ones" or "saints", with emphasis on consecration and ideally the absence of moral and ceremonial defilement. The Old Testament does not present a fixed category of individual saints though related ideas appear in prophet and martyr traditions in later narratives.

=== Apostolic Age ===
In the Apostolic Age, New Testament writers use "saints" predominantly in the plural as a collective designation for Christians in a given locality; the only clear singular instance is distributive in Philippians 4:21 ("every saint"), so the term marks the church as a people set apart for God rather than an elite subgroup.

Paul makes this corporate sense explicit by identifying "the saints" with "you" in 1 Corinthians 6:2, so that oi hagioi functions as a self-designation for all Christians; he also addresses communities as "saints" in letter openings/closings and often speaks of "all the saints" to emphasize corporate unity across locations (Romans 1:7; 1 Cor 1:2; 2 Cor 1:1; Phil 1:1; Colossians 1:2).

In practical matters he urges "service" and aid "for the saints," including the Jerusalem poor, sometimes with abbreviated phrasing that presumes this shared self-designation (e.g., 1 Cor 16:1; 2 Cor 8:4; 9:1, 12 ≈ Rom 15:26). Scholars also observe covenantal–eschatological and temple/priestly overtones in such language (e.g., judging the world/angels; participation in Christ’s altar). Other New Testament writers vary: calling believers hagioi is common in Hebrews and Jude, it is frequent in Revelation with an emphasis on prayer/endurance and is used for the same group as "believers/Christians," while 1 Peter does not use hagioi as Paul does (even as it speaks extensively of holiness).

Standard reference works concur that hagioi designates all believers (not a special class), that the plural, collective usage predominates, and that the underlying idea is consecration/belonging to God. Later Christian traditions (e.g. Eastern Orthodoxy, Catholicism, Protestantism) developed distinct practices of recognizing exemplary figures, but this stands apart from the New Testament’s collective usage.

== By denomination ==
=== Catholic Church ===
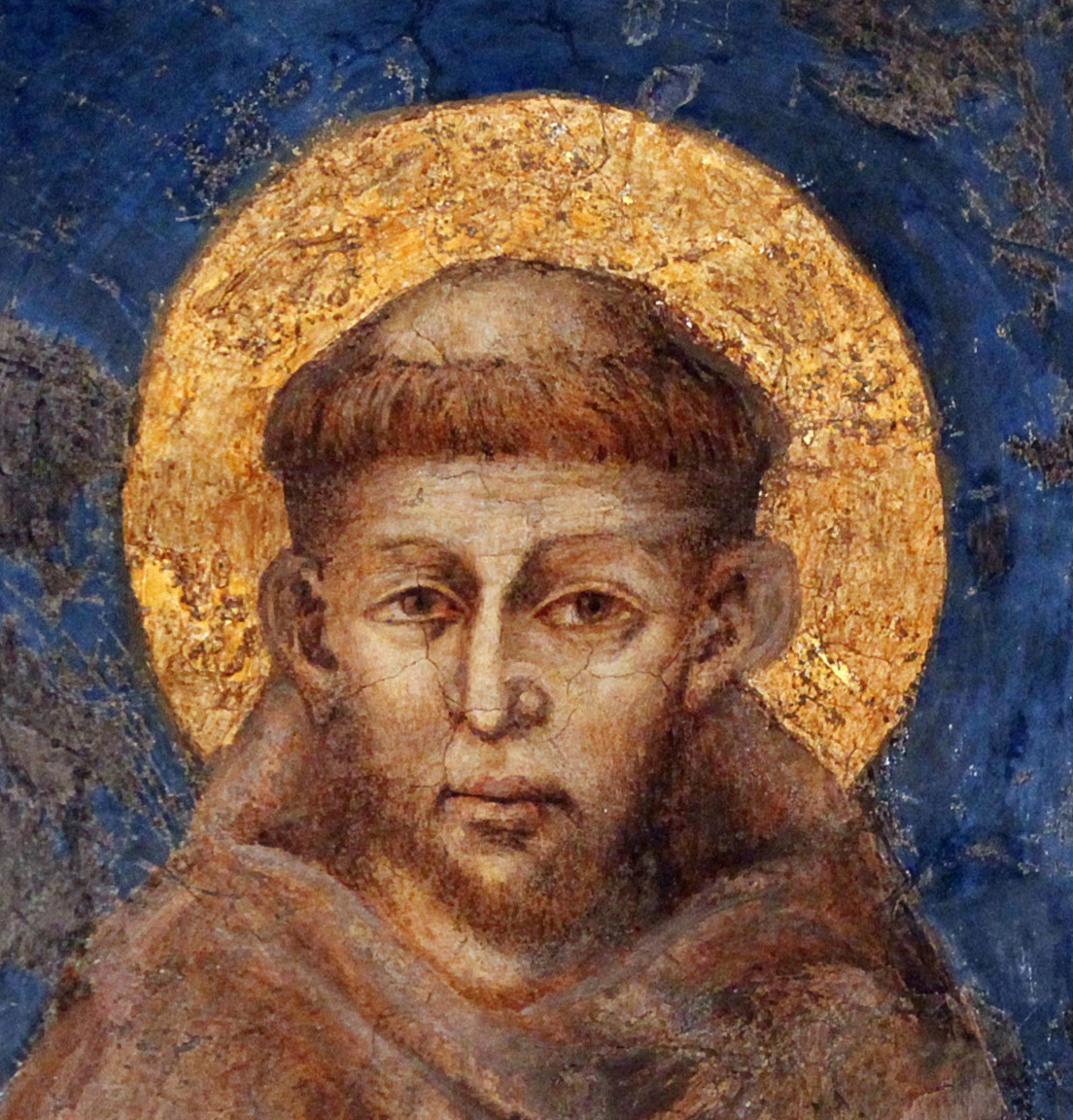
A portrait depicting Saint Francis of Assisi by the Italian artist Cimabue (1240–1302)

According to the Catholic Church, a saint may be anyone, whether recognized on Earth or not, who forms part of the "great cloud of witnesses" (Hebrews 12:1). These "may include our own mothers, grandmothers or other loved ones (cf. 2 Timothy 1:5)" who may have not always lived perfect lives, but "amid their faults and failings they kept moving forward and proved pleasing to the Lord". The title Saint denotes a person who has been formally canonized – that is, officially and authoritatively declared a saint – by the church as holder of the Keys of the Kingdom of Heaven, and is therefore believed to be in Heaven by the grace of God. There are many persons who the church believes to be in Heaven who have not been formally canonized and who are otherwise titled saints because of the fame of their holiness. Sometimes the word saint also denotes living Christians. The Second Vatican Council noted that some saints are commemorated by the whole church because they "are truly of universal importance", while many others have significance for "a particular Church or nation or family of religious" and their lives should be celebrated within those particular contexts.

According to the Catechism of the Catholic Church, "The patriarchs, prophets, and certain other Old Testament figures have been and always will be honored as saints in all the church's liturgical traditions."

In his book Saint of the Day, editor Leonard Foley says that the "[Saints'] surrender to God's love was so generous an approach to the total surrender of Jesus that the Church recognizes them as heroes and heroines worthy to be held up for our inspiration. They remind us that the Church is holy, can never stop being holy and is called to show the holiness of God by living the life of Christ."

The Catholic Church teaches that it does not make or create saints, but rather recognizes them. Proofs of heroic virtue required in the process of beatification will serve to illustrate in detail the general principles exposed above upon proof of their holiness or likeness to God.

On 3 January 993, Pope John XV became the first pope to proclaim a person a saint from outside the diocese of Rome: on the petition of the German ruler, he had canonized Bishop Ulrich of Augsburg. Before that time, the popular "cults", or venerations, of saints had been local and spontaneous and were confirmed by the local bishop. Pope John XVIII subsequently permitted a cult of five Polish martyrs. Pope Benedict VIII later declared the Armenian hermit Simeon of Mantua to be a saint, but it was not until the pontificate of Pope Innocent III that the popes reserved to themselves the exclusive authority to canonize saints, so that local bishops needed the confirmation of the Pope. Walter of Pontoise was the last person in Western Europe to be canonized by an authority other than the Pope: Hugh de Boves, the Archbishop of Rouen, canonized him in 1153. Thenceforth a decree of Pope Alexander III in 1170 reserved the prerogative of canonization to the Pope, insofar as the Latin Church was concerned.

Alban Butler published Lives of the Saints in 1756, including a total of 1,486 saints. The latest revision of this book, edited by Herbert Thurston and Donald Attwater, contains the lives of 2,565 saints. Robert Sarno, an official of the Dicastery for the Causes of Saints of the Holy See, expressed that it is impossible to give an exact number of saints.

The veneration of saints, in Latin cultus, or the "cult of the Saints", describes a particular popular devotion or entrustment of one's self to a particular saint or group of saints. Although the term worship is sometimes used, it is only used with the older English connotation of honoring or respecting (dulia) a person. According to the church, divine worship is in the strict sense reserved only to God (latria) and never to the saints. One is permitted to ask the saints to intercede or pray to God for persons still on Earth, just as one can ask someone on Earth to pray for him.

A saint may be designated as a patron saint of a particular cause, profession, church or locale, or invoked as a protector against specific illnesses or disasters, sometimes by popular custom and sometimes by official declarations of the church. Saints are not believed to have power of their own, but only that granted by God. Relics of saints are respected, or venerated, similar to the veneration of holy images and icons. The practice in past centuries of venerating relics of saints with the intention of obtaining healing from God through their intercession is taken from the early Church. For example, an American deacon claimed in 2000 that John Henry Newman (then a blessed) interceded with God to cure him of a physical illness. The deacon, Jack Sullivan, asserted that after addressing Newman he was cured of spinal stenosis in a matter of hours. In 2009, a panel of theologians concluded that Sullivan's recovery was the result of his prayer to Newman. According to the church, to be deemed a miracle, "a medical recovery must be instantaneous, not attributable to treatment, disappear for good."

Some of the saints have a special iconographic symbol by tradition, e.g., Saint Lawrence, deacon and martyr, is identified by a gridiron because he is believed to have been burned to death on one. This symbol is found, for instance, in the Canadian heraldry of the office responsible for the St. Lawrence Seaway.

==== Stages of a canonization process ====
Canonization is a lengthy process, often of many years or even centuries. In a beatification process there are four major steps: The first stage in this process is an investigation of the candidate's life by an expert. After this, the official report on the candidate is submitted to the bishop of the pertinent diocese and more study is undertaken. The information is then sent to the Dicastery for the Causes of Saints of the Holy See for evaluation at the universal level of the church. If the application is approved the candidate may be granted the title Venerable (stage 2). Further investigation may lead to the candidate's beatification with the title Blessed, which is elevation to the class of the Beati and means that the Blessed is venerated in the liturgy regionally. Next, and at a minimum, proof of two important miracles through the intercession of the candidate are required for a canonization. Finally, in the last stage, after all of these procedures are complete, the pope may canonize the candidate. for veneration by the universal church.

Once a person has been canonized, the deceased body of the saint is considered holy as a relic. The remains of saints are called holy relics and are usually used in churches. Saints' personal belongings may also be used as relics.

=== Eastern Orthodoxy ===
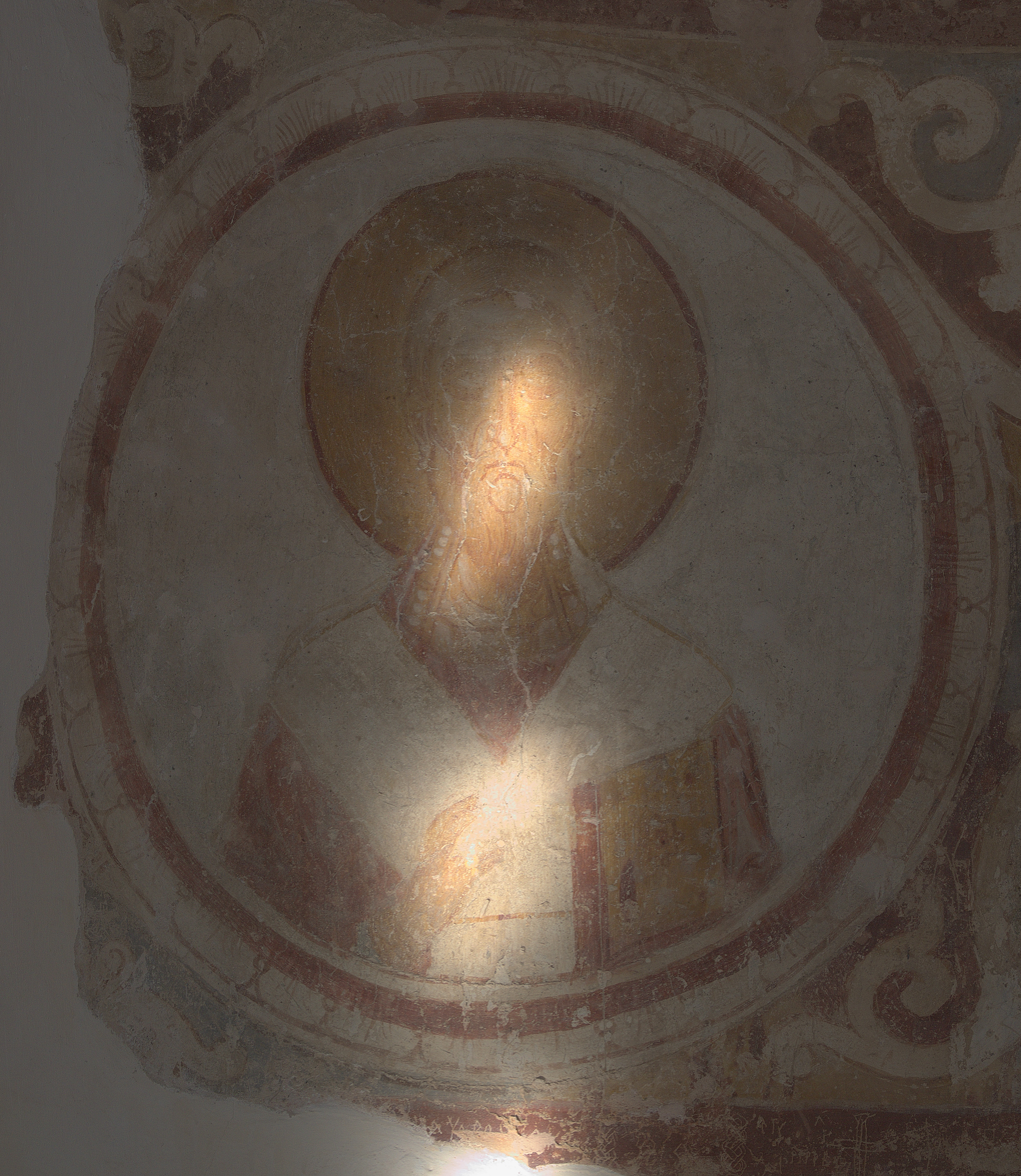
Saint, 12th-century fresco in Staraya Ladoga

In the Eastern Orthodox Church, a saint is defined as anyone who is in Heaven besides God, whether recognised here on earth, or not. By this definition, Adam and Eve, Moses, the various prophets, and archangels are all given the title of "Saint". Sainthood does not necessarily reflect a moral model, but communion with God; there are many examples of people who lived in great sin and became saints by humility and repentance: Saints Mary of Egypt, Moses the Ethiopian, and Dismas, the repentant thief who was crucified with Jesus Christ. Therefore, a more complete Orthodox definition of what a saint is, has to do with the way that saints, through their humility and their love of mankind, saved inside them the entire Church, and loved all people.

==== Canonization ====
The Orthodox belief is that God reveals saints through answered prayers and other miracles. Saints are usually recognised by their local community, often by people who directly knew them. As their popularity grows they are often then recognised by the entire Church through the Holy Spirit. The word canonization means that a Christian has been found worthy to have his name placed in the canon (official list) of saints of the Church. The formal process of recognition involves deliberation by a synod of bishops. The Orthodox Church does not require the manifestation of miracles, as it does in Catholicism; what is required is evidence of a virtuous life and prior local veneration of the saint.

If the ecclesiastical review is successful, this is followed by a service of glorification in which the saint is given a day on the liturgical calendar to be celebrated by the entire Church. This does not, however, make the person a saint; the person already was a saint and the Church ultimately recognized it.

As a general rule, only clergy will touch relics in order to move them or carry them in procession; however, in veneration the faithful will kiss the relic to show love and respect toward the saint. The altar in an Orthodox Church usually contains relics of saints, often of martyrs. Church interiors are covered with the icons of saints. When an Orthodox Christian venerates icons of a saint he is venerating the image of God which he sees in the saint.

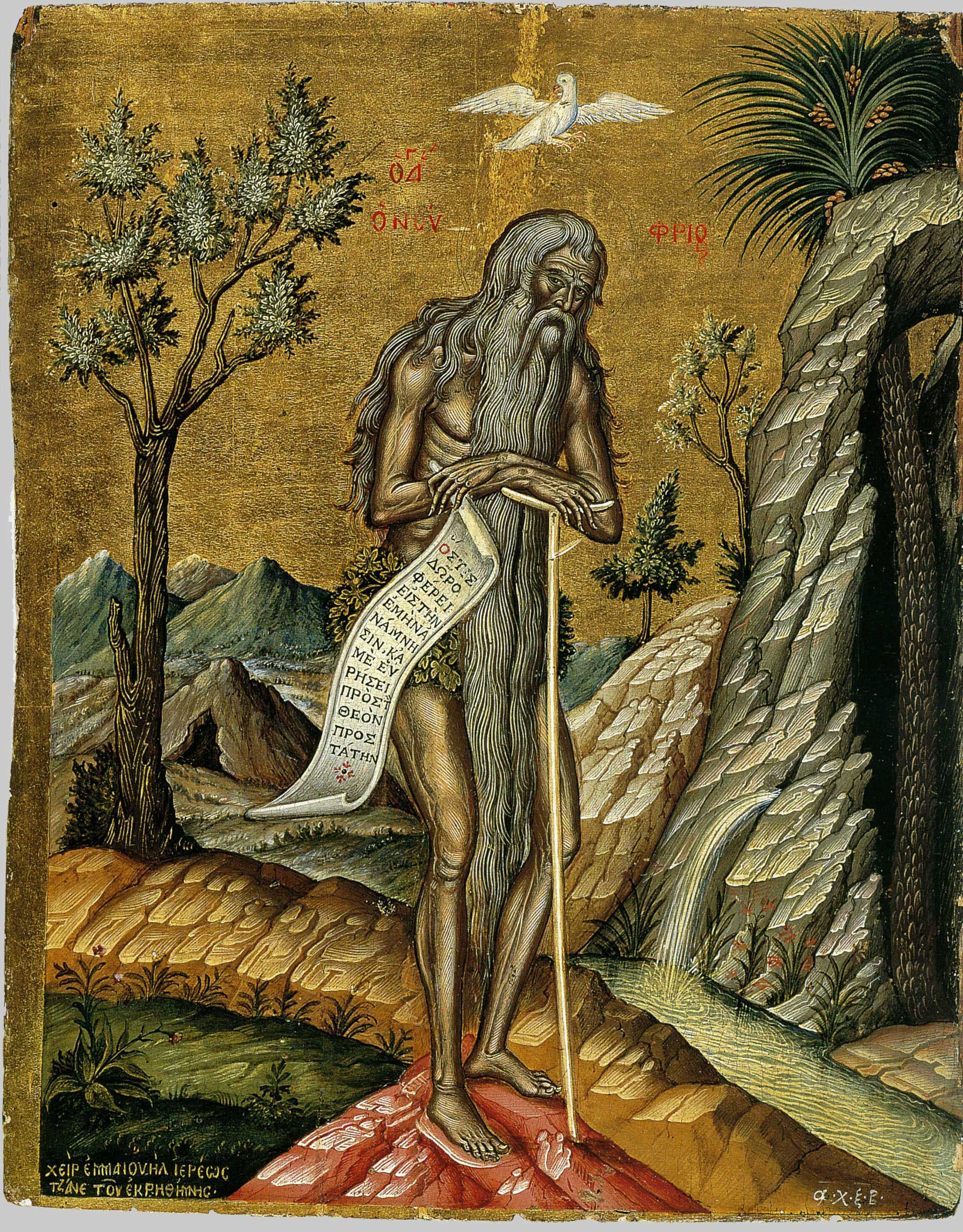
Eremitic Saint Onuphrius by Emmanuel Tzanes, 1662

Because the Church shows no true distinction between the living and the dead, as the saints are considered to be alive in heaven, saints are referred to as if they are still alive, and are venerated, not worshipped. They are believed to be able to intercede for the living for salvation or other requests and help mankind either through direct communion with God or by personal miraculous intervention.

In the Eastern Orthodox Church, the title Ὅσιος, Hosios (f. Ὁσία Hosia) is also used. This is a title attributed to saints who had lived a monastic or eremitic life equivalent to the more usual title of "Saint".

=== Oriental Orthodoxy ===
The Oriental Orthodox churches ‒ the Armenian Apostolic Church, the Coptic Orthodox Church of Alexandria, the Tewahedo Church, Malankara Syrian Orthodox Church, and the Syriac Orthodox Church ‒ follow a canonization process unique to each church. The Coptic Orthodox Church of Alexandria, for example, has the requirement that at least 50 years must pass following a prospective saint's death before the Coptic Orthodox Church's pope can canonize the saint.

=== Evangelical Lutheranism ===
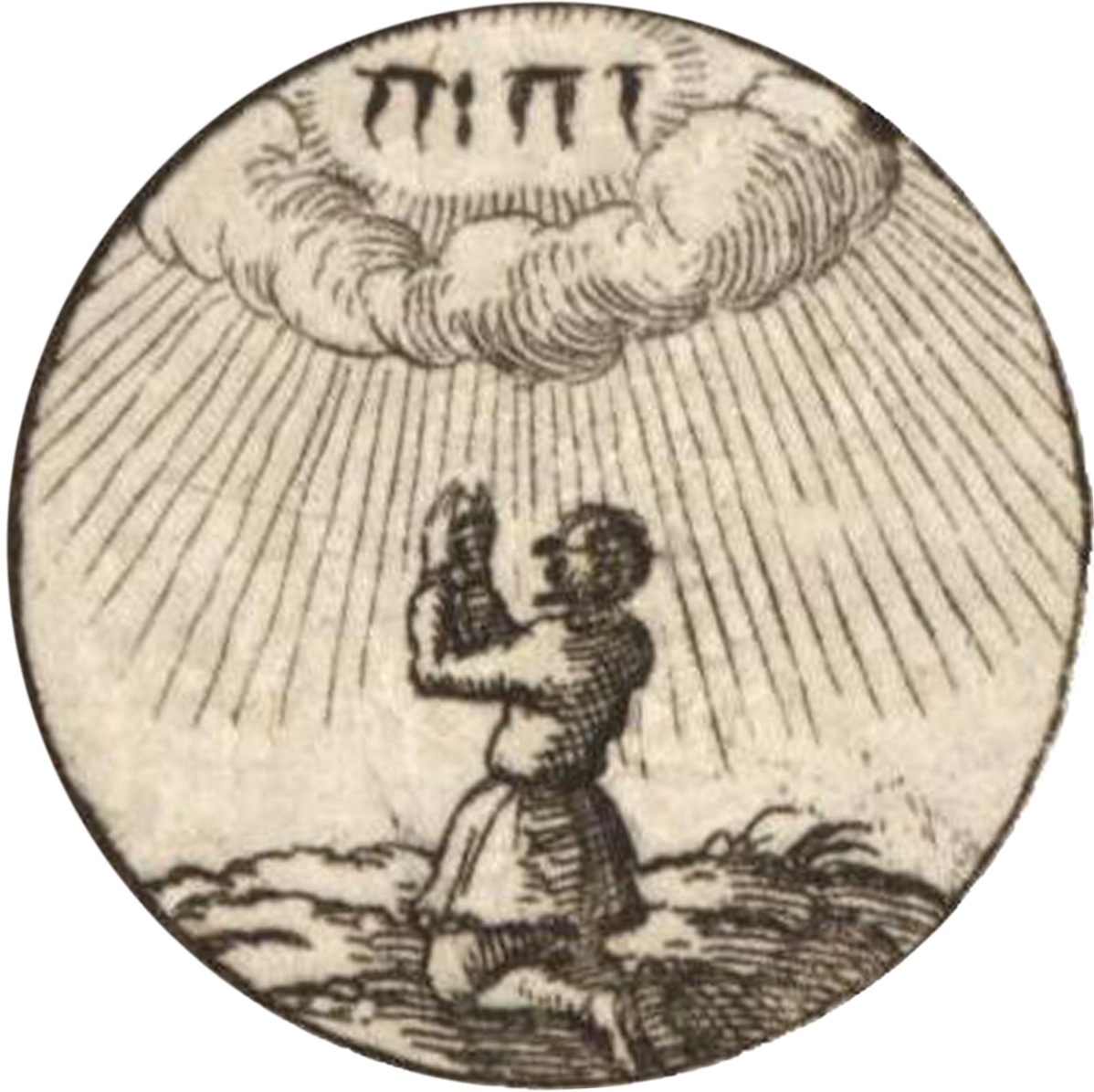
"Scripture does not teach calling on the saints or pleading for help from them. For it sets before us Christ alone as mediator, atoning sacrifice, high priest, and intercessor."—A.C. Article XXI.

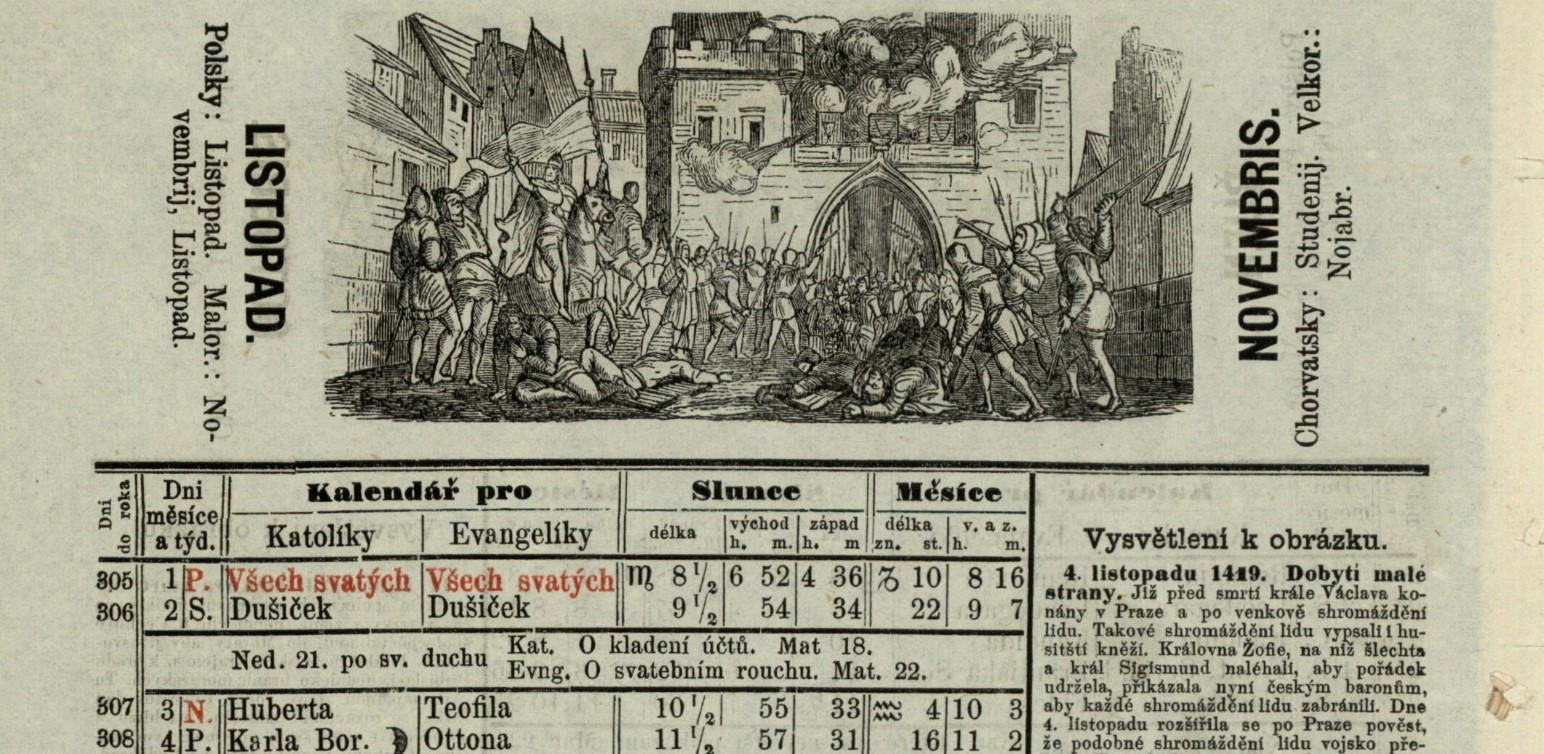
The month of November in the Czech calendar for 1867 (detail). The calendar of saints is given for both Catholics and Protestants.

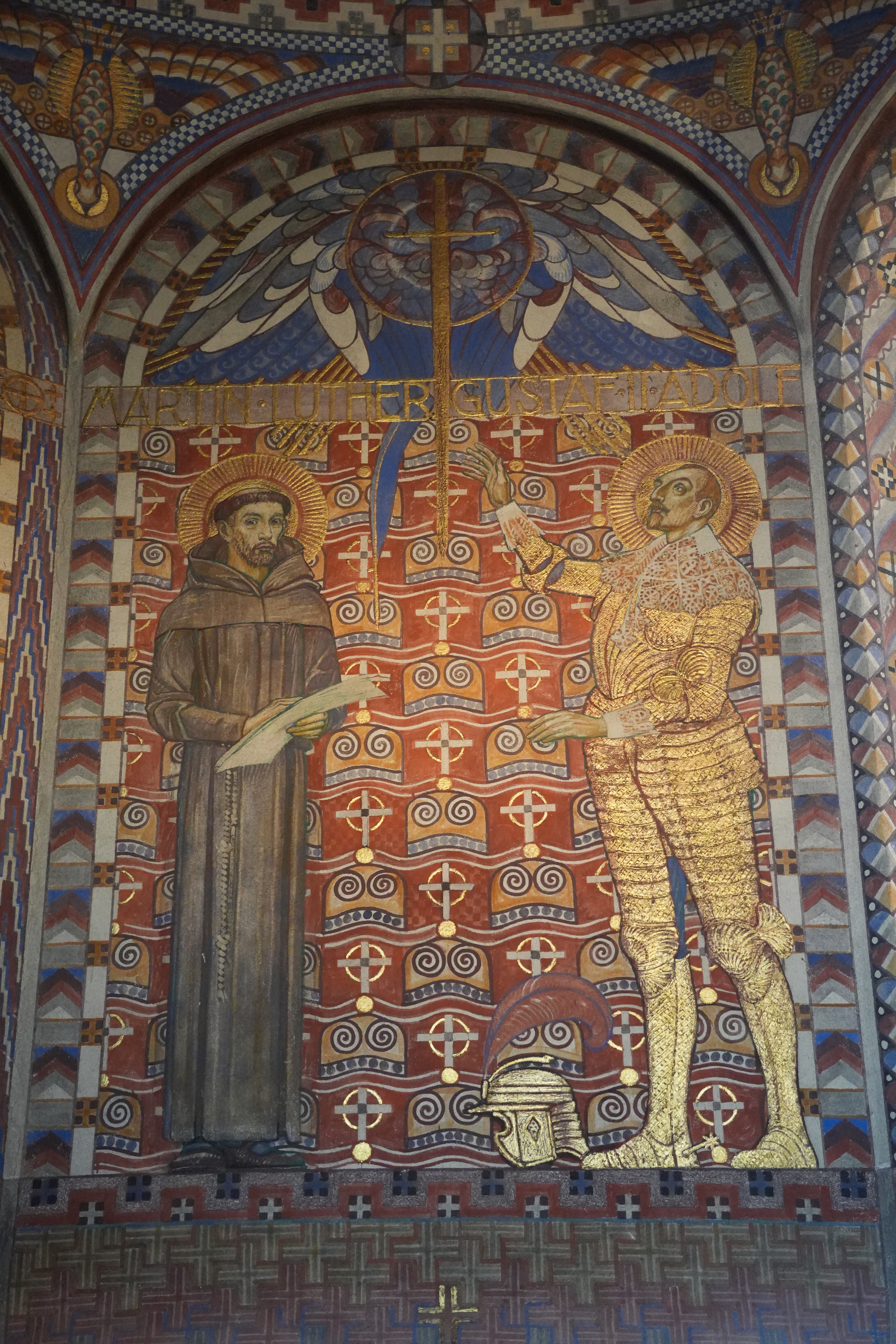
Martin Luther and Gustavus Adolphus depicted with haloes, a traditional attribute of saints, in a wall painting in the Lutheran Church of the Revelation in Saltsjöbaden, Sweden.

In the Lutheran Church, all Christians, whether in Heaven or on Earth, are regarded as saints. However, the church still recognizes and honors specific saints, including some of those recognized by the Catholic Church, but in a qualified way: according to the Augsburg Confession, the term saint is used in the manner of the Catholic Church only insofar as to denote a person who received exceptional grace, was sustained by faith, and whose good works are to be an example to any Christian. Evangelical-Lutherans believe that saints pray for the Christian Church in general. However, Evangelical-Lutheran belief accounts that prayers to the saints are prohibited, as they are not mediators of redemption. Philip Melanchthon, the author of the Apology of the Augsburg Confession, approved honoring the saints by saying they are honored in three ways:

1. By thanking God for examples of His mercy;
2. By using the saints as examples for strengthening our faith; and
3. By imitating their faith and other virtues.

The Lutheran churches have liturgical calendars in which they honor individuals as saints.

The invocation of saints was criticized in the Augsburg Confession, Article XXI: Of the Worship of the Saints. This criticism was rebutted by the Catholic side in the Confutatio Augustana, which in turn was rebutted by the Evangelical Lutheran side in the Apology of the Augsburg Confession.

=== Anglicanism ===
In the Anglican Communion and the Continuing Anglican movement, the title of Saint refers to a person who has been elevated by popular opinion as a pious and holy person. The saints are seen as models of holiness to be imitated, and as a "cloud of witnesses" that strengthen and encourage the believer during his or her spiritual journey. The saints are seen as elder brothers and sisters in Christ. Official Anglican creeds recognize the existence of the saints in heaven.

In high-church contexts, such as Anglo-Catholicism, a saint is generally one to whom has been attributed (and who has generally demonstrated) a high level of holiness and sanctity. In this use, a saint is therefore not a believer only, but one who has been transformed by virtue. In Catholicism, a saint is a special sign of God's activity. The veneration of saints is sometimes misunderstood to be worship, in which case it is derisively termed "hagiolatry".

So far as invocation of the saints is concerned, one of the Church of England's Articles of Religion "Of Purgatory" condemns "the Romish Doctrine concerning ...(the) Invocation of Saints" as "a fond thing vainly invented, and grounded upon no warranty of Scripture, but rather repugnant to the Word of God". Anglo-Catholics in Anglican provinces using the Articles often make a distinction between a "Romish" and a "Patristic" doctrine concerning the invocation of saints, permitting the latter in accordance with Article XXII. Indeed, the theologian E. J. Bicknell stated that the Anglican view acknowledges that the term "invocation may mean either of two things: the simple request to a saint for his prayers (intercession), 'ora pro nobis', or a request for some particular benefit. In medieval times the saints had come to be regarded as themselves the authors of blessings. Such a view was condemned but the former was affirmed."

Some Anglicans and Anglican churches, particularly Anglo-Catholics, personally ask prayers of the saints. However, such a practice is seldom found in any official Anglican liturgy. Unusual examples of it are found in The Korean Liturgy 1938, the liturgy of the Diocese of Guiana 1959 and The Melanesian English Prayer Book.

Anglicans believe that the only effective Mediator between the believer and God the Father, in terms of redemption and salvation, is God the Son, Jesus Christ. Historical Anglicanism has drawn a distinction between the intercession of the saints and the invocation of the saints. The former was generally accepted in Anglican doctrine, while the latter was generally rejected. There are some, however, in Anglicanism, who do beseech the saints' intercession. Those who beseech the saints to intercede on their behalf make a distinction between mediator and intercessor, and claim that asking for the prayers of the saints is no different in kind than asking for the prayers of living Christians. Anglo-Catholics understand sainthood in a more Catholic or Orthodox way, often praying for intercessions from the saints and celebrating their feast days.

According to the Church of England, a saint is one who is sanctified, as it translates in the Authorized King James Version (1611) 2 Chronicles 6:41:

Now therefore arise, O LORD God, into thy resting place, thou, and the ark of thy strength: let thy priests, O LORD God, be clothed with salvation, and let thy saints rejoice in goodness.

=== Methodism ===
While Methodists as a whole do not venerate saints, they do honor and admire them. Methodists believe that all Christians are saints, but mainly use the term to refer to biblical figures, Christian leaders, and martyrs of the faith. Many Methodist churches are named after saints—such as the Twelve Apostles, John Wesley, etc.—although most are named after geographical locations associated with an early circuit or prominent location. Methodist congregations observe All Saints' Day. Many encourage the study of saints, that is, the biographies of holy people.

The 14th Article of Religion in the United Methodist Book of Discipline states:

The Romish doctrine concerning purgatory, pardon, worshiping, and adoration, as well of images as of relics, and also invocation of saints, is a fond thing, vainly invented, and grounded upon no warrant of Scripture, but repugnant to the Word of God.

=== Other Protestantism ===
In many Protestant churches, the word saint is used more generally to refer to anyone who is a Christian. This is similar in usage to Paul's numerous references in the New Testament of the Bible. In this sense, anyone who is within the Body of Christ (i.e., a professing Christian) is a saint because of their relationship with Christ Jesus. Many Protestants consider intercessory prayers to the saints to be idolatry, since what they perceive to be an application of divine worship that should be given only to God himself is being given to other believers, dead or alive.

Within some Protestant traditions, saint is also used to refer to any born-again Christian. Many emphasize the traditional New Testament meaning of the word, preferring to write "saint" to refer to any believer, in continuity with the doctrine of the priesthood of all believers.

==== Baptist ====
"Saints" in Baptist theology refers to the body of 'born-again believers'. The reference 'saints' is a derivative of the word 'sanctified', which means 'set apart for a holy purpose'. In the Apostle Paul's first letter to the Corinthians, he addresses the recipients as saints: "To the church of God that is in Corinth, to those sanctified in Christ Jesus, called to be saints together with all those who in every place call upon the name of our Lord Jesus Christ, both their Lord and ours". (1 Corinthians 1:2)

=== The Church of Jesus Christ of Latter-day Saints ===
The use of "saint" within the Church of Jesus Christ of Latter-day Saints (LDS Church) is similar to the Protestant tradition. In the New Testament, saints are all those who have entered into the Christian covenant of baptism. The qualification "latter-day" refers to the doctrine that members are living in the latter days before the Second Coming of Christ, and is used to distinguish the members of the church, which considers itself the restoration of the ancient Christian church. Members are therefore often referred to as "Latter-day Saints" or "LDS", and among themselves as "saints".

== Comparative religion ==
In some theological literature, the use of the term saint tends to be used in non-Christian contexts as well. In many religions, there are people who have been recognized within their tradition as having fulfilled the highest aspirations of religious teaching. In English, the term saint is often used to translate this idea from many world religions. The Jewish ḥasīd or tsaddiq, the Islamic qidees, the Zoroastrian Fravashi, the Hindu Shadhus, the Buddhist Arahant or Bodhisattva, the Daoist Shengren, the Shinto Kami, and others have all been referred to as saints.

=== African diaspora ===
Cuban Santería, Haitian Vodou, Trinidad Orisha-Shango, Brazilian Umbanda, Candomblé, and other similar syncretist religions adopted the Catholic saints, or at least the images of the saints, and applied their own spirits/deities to them. They are worshipped in churches (where they appear as saints) and in religious festivals, where they appear as the deities. The name santería was originally a pejorative term for those whose worship of saints deviated from Catholic norms.

=== Druze faith ===
Due to the Christian influence on Druze faith, two Christian saints became the Druze's favorite venerated figures: Saint George and Saint Elijah. Thus, in all the villages inhabited by Druzes and Christians in central Mount Lebanon a Christian church or Druze maqam is dedicated to either one of them. According to scholar Ray Jabre Mouawad the Druzes appreciated the two saints for their bravery: Saint George because he confronted the dragon and Saint Elijah because he competed with the pagan priests of Baal and won over them. In both cases the explanations provided by Christians is that Druzes were attracted to warrior saints that resemble their own militarized society.

=== Islam ===
Besides prophets, according to Islam, saints possess blessings (Arabic: بركة, "baraka") and can perform miracles (Arabic: كرامات, Karāmāt). Saints rank lower than prophets. However, they can intercede for people on the Day of Judgment, but their intercession is limited compared to the intercession of the Islamic prophet Muhammad. Both the tombs of prophets and saints are visited frequently (Ziyarat) as well as visiting modern-day living saints. Unlike prophets, women like Rabia of Basra were accepted as saints.

Saints are recognized as having specific traits they can be identified through. These include: floating lights appearing above their tomb, the body not decaying, a pleasant and miraculous odor coming from the body, appearing in the dreams of others who they pray on behalf of, and having normally impossible knowledge.

Islam has had a rich history of veneration of saints (often called wali, which literally means 'Friend [of God]'), which has declined in some parts of the Islamic world in the twentieth century due to the influence of the various streams of Salafism. In Sunni Islam, the veneration of saints became a very common form of devotion early on, and saints came to be defined in the eighth-century as a group of "special people chosen by God and endowed with exceptional gifts, such as the ability to work miracles." The classical Sunni scholars came to recognize and honor these individuals as venerable people who were both "loved by God and developed a close relationship of love to Him." "Belief in the miracles of saints (karāmāt al-awliyāʾ) ... [became a] requirement in Sunni Islam [during the classical period]," with even medieval critics of the ubiquitous practice of grave visitation like Ibn Taymiyyah emphatically declaring: "The miracles of saints are absolutely true and correct, and acknowledged by all Muslim scholars. The Quran has pointed to it in different places, "A messenger who has instructed them in scripture and wisdom, and sanctify them." (Quran 2:129) and hadiths have mentioned it, and whoever denies the miraculous power of saints are innovators or following innovators." The vast majority of saints venerated in the classical Sunni world were the Sufis, who were all Sunni mystics who belonged to one of the four orthodox legal schools of Sunni law.

Veneration of saints eventually became one of the most widespread Sunni practices for more than a millennium, before it was opposed in the twentieth century by the Salafi movement, whose various streams regard it as "being both un-Islamic and backwards ... rather than the integral part of Islam which they were for over a millennium." In a manner similar to the Protestant Reformation, the specific traditional practices which Salafism has tried to curtail in both Sunni and Shia contexts include those of the veneration of saints, visiting their graves, seeking their intercession, and honoring their relics. As Christopher Taylor has remarked: "[Throughout Islamic history] a vital dimension of Islamic piety was the veneration of Muslim saints ... [Due, however to] certain strains of thought within the Islamic tradition itself, particularly pronounced in the nineteenth and the twentieth centuries ... [some modern day] Muslims have either resisted acknowledging the existence of Muslim saints altogether or have viewed their presence and veneration as unacceptable deviations."

Despite attempts by the Salafis to minimise the importance of saints in Islam, there are many living saints with huge popularity, often with millions of followers, mainly found in the Sufi orders or tariqat. They follow the teachings of the Muhammad and are usually direct descendants of him. They are also scholars of the religion. Well-known modern-day saints include Sheikhs Nazim Al-Haqqani, Hisham Kabbani, Mehmet Adil of the Naqshbandi Sufi Order, Habib Umar bin Hafiz of the Ba'Alawi Tariqat, Muhammad al-Yaqoubi of the Shadhili Tariqa, muffakir-e-islam Abdul Qadir Jilani and his son pir syed ali imam shah jilani of the Qadiri tariqa.

Famous Islamic saints in history include syed Abdul Qadir Gilani (Gawth pak), Rumi, Ibn Arabi and Al-Ghazali.

=== Judaism ===
The term Tzadik, 'righteous', and its associated meanings developed in rabbinic thought from its Talmudic contrast with Ḥasīd, 'pious'.

In Morocco, the similarities of Moroccan Jewish and Muslim practices, including saint veneration, were used by colonial powers to claim Morocco was unified and consisted of a distinct nation, but were not sufficiently united to resist imperialism.

=== New religious movements ===
Thelema is a new religious movement with a list of saints including individuals such as Roger Bacon.

== See also ==
- Calendar of saints
- Communion of saints
- Devil's advocate
- Hagiography
- Hallow
- Mar (title)
- Latter Day Saint movement
- Lists of saints
- List of pharaohs deified during lifetime
- Martyrology
- Sage (philosophy)
- Saint Companions
- Secular saint
