= Abdullah ad-Daghistani =

Russian Sufi (1891–1973)

Shaykh Abdullah al-Faiz ad-Daghistani
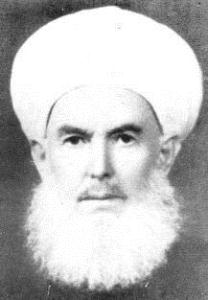
- Photo of Abdullah ad-Daghistani
- Born: 14 December 1891; Dagestan, Russian Empire
- Died: 30 September 1973 (aged 81); Damascus, Syria
- Occupation: Sufi Shaykh
- Predecessor: Shaykh Sharafuddin ad-Daghestani
- Successor: Shaykh Nazim Al-Haqqani

Abdullah al-Faiz ad-Daghistani (Arabic: عبد الله الفائز الداغستاني), was the 39th Shaykh in the Naqshbandi Haqqani Silsila.

== Early life ==
He was born in the North Caucasian region of Dagestan, then part of the Russian Empire, in 1891. Both his father and elder brother were medical doctors, the latter being a surgeon in the Imperial Russian Army. Shaykh Abdullah was raised and trained by his maternal uncle, Shaykh Sharafuddin Daghistani (1875–1936). George Gurdjieff visited him for a meeting regarding the Enneagram.

== Move to Ottoman Turkey ==
In the late 1890s Shaykh Abdullah's family emigrated to the Ottoman Empire, following his uncle, Shaykh Sharafuddin who had emigrated in the 1870s. They settled in the northwestern Anatolian city of Bursa and after a year moved to the village of Reşadiye, now known as Güneyköy, in Yalova Province, Turkey. The new village was established on land granted by the sultan and was populated by Daghistani refugees affected by the War of '93 and the uprising against the Russian Empire. Shortly thereafter, Shaykh Abdullah's father died, and at the age of 15 he married a Daghistani named Halima.

== Training in Sufism ==
In 1910, after merely six months of marriage, Shaykh Sharafuddin ordered Abdullah into a Sufi seclusion (khalwa) for five years. This practice included severe austerities that were intended to raise his spiritual rank. When Abdullah returned to secular life the Ottoman Empire was embroiled in the First World War. Along with many young men of his village, Abdullah entered military service and took part in the Battle of Gallipoli. During a firefight he was severely wounded by enemy fire.

In 1921, Abdullah was instructed by Shaykh Sharafuddin to enter another five years seclusion. He completed this and was then granted a license, or ijazah, to be a master, or shaykh, in the Naqshbandi order.

== Interlude in Egypt ==
Because of anti-Sufi regulations in the new Turkish Republic, Shaykh Abdullah began to contemplate leaving the country. After the death of Shaykh Sharafuddin in 1936, a delegation came to Rashadiya (Reşadiye) from King Farouk to pay their condolences, as he had many followers in Egypt. One of Shaykh Abdullah's daughters married a member of the delegation. Shaykh Abdullah and the family then moved to Egypt, though they would remain there for only half a year as the marriage soon ended in divorce.

== Life in Syria ==
Following his daughter's divorce, Shaykh Abdullah and his family then moved to Syria where he would remain for the rest of his life. He resided for a time in Aleppo, moved to Homs and then finally to Damascus near the tomb of saint Sa'd ad-Din Jibawi. There, he established the first tekke for his branch of the Naqshbandi order.

In 1943, he moved to a house on Jabal Qasioun mountain. The house was bought by his first Syrian murid and later one of his deputies in the Sufi order, Shaykh Husayn Ifrini. This house is now the site of his burial shrine and its adjoining mosque.

== Death ==
Shaykh Abdullah died on September 30, 1973, in Damascus. His grave and burial shrine are in Damascus, Syria, at the site of his former home and mosque on Jabal Qasioun mountain.

== Notable followers ==
Among his notable followers are Shaykh Nazim al-Haqqani, Shaykh Hisham al Kabbani, Shaykh Adil Mehmet, Husayn Ifrini and Shaykh Adnan Kabbani. His student and successor, Shaykh Nazim, continued to carry on the spread of Shaykh Abdullah's teachings around the world.

== See also ==
- John G. Bennett
- George Gurdjieff
- Naqshbandi Haqqani Sufi Order
