= International Islamic Unity Conference =

International Islamic Unity Conference may refer to:

- International Islamic Unity Conference (Iran)
- International Islamic Unity Conference (US)
