= Naqshbandi-Haqqani Golden Chain =

Sufi Sheikh chain of succession

The Naqshbandi-Haqqani Golden Chain is the chain of succession of Sufi Shaykhs in the Naqshbandi-Haqqani Sufi Order.

== Chain ==
1. Prophet Muhammad
2. Abu Bakr as-Siddiq
3. Salman the Persian
4. Qasim ibn Muhammad ibn Abi Bakr
5. Jafar al-Sadiq
6. Tayfur Bayazid Bastami
7. Abu al-Hassan al-Kharaqani
8. Abu Ali Farmadi
9. Yusuf Hamadani
10. Abu'l-Abbas al-Khidr
11. Abdul Khaliq Ghijduwani
12. Arif Riwgari
13. Mahmood Anjir Faghnawi
14. Ali Ramitani
15. Mohammad Baba As-Samasi
16. Sayyid Amir Kulal
17. Baha' al-Din Naqshband
18. Sayyid Alauddin Atar
19. Yaqub al-Charkhi
20. Khwaja Ahrar
21. Muhammad Zahid Wakhshi
22. Darwish Muhammad
23. Muhammad Khwaja al-Amkanaki
24. Khwaja Baqi Billah
25. Mujaddid Alf ath-Thani Ahmad Sirhindi
26. Muhammad Ma'sum Sirhindi
27. Muhammad Sayfuddin al-Faruqi
28. Sayyid Nur Muhammad al-Badawani
29. Shams-ud-Dīn Habīb Allāh
30. Shah Abdullah ad-Dahlawi
31. Shaykh Khalid al-Baghdadi
32. Shaykh Ismail Muhammad al-Shirwani
33. Shaykh Khas Muhammad ash-Shirwani
34. Shaykh Muhammad Effendi al-Yaraghi
35. Sayyid Jamaluddin al-Kumuki al-Husayni
36. Shaykh Abu Ahmad as-Sughuri
37. Shaykh Abu Muhammad al-Madani
38. Shaykh Sharafuddin al-Daghistani
39. Shaykh Abdullah al-Fa'izi ad-Daghistani
40. Mawlana Shaykh Nazim al-Qubrusi
41. Mawlana Shaykh Mehmet Adil ar-Rabbani

== See also ==
- Naqshbandi Haqqani Sufi Order
