= Saint Companions =

There are a number of people venerated as saints within the Christian Church who are named only as Companions of another named saint. The following is an incomplete list of examples:

- Saints Perpetua and Felicity and Companions
- Saints Donnan and Companions
- Saint Ursula and (Eleven Thousand Virgin Martyr) Companions

The reason why the Companions are not named in convention vary. In some instances, such as with Donnan, it may be that the Companions' names are simply not known, although the acts for which they are venerated as saints have been documented. In the case of the Companions of Perpetua her and Felicity's three companions are known (Revocatus, Saturninus, and Saturus, their teacher). In this case the reason is that Perpetua and Felicity are the most prominent names in the story of their martyrdom (due to their associations with their young babies).
