= Mehmet Adil =

Naqashbandi-Haqqani Sufi religious leader (born 1957)

Mawlana Shaykh Mehmet Adil
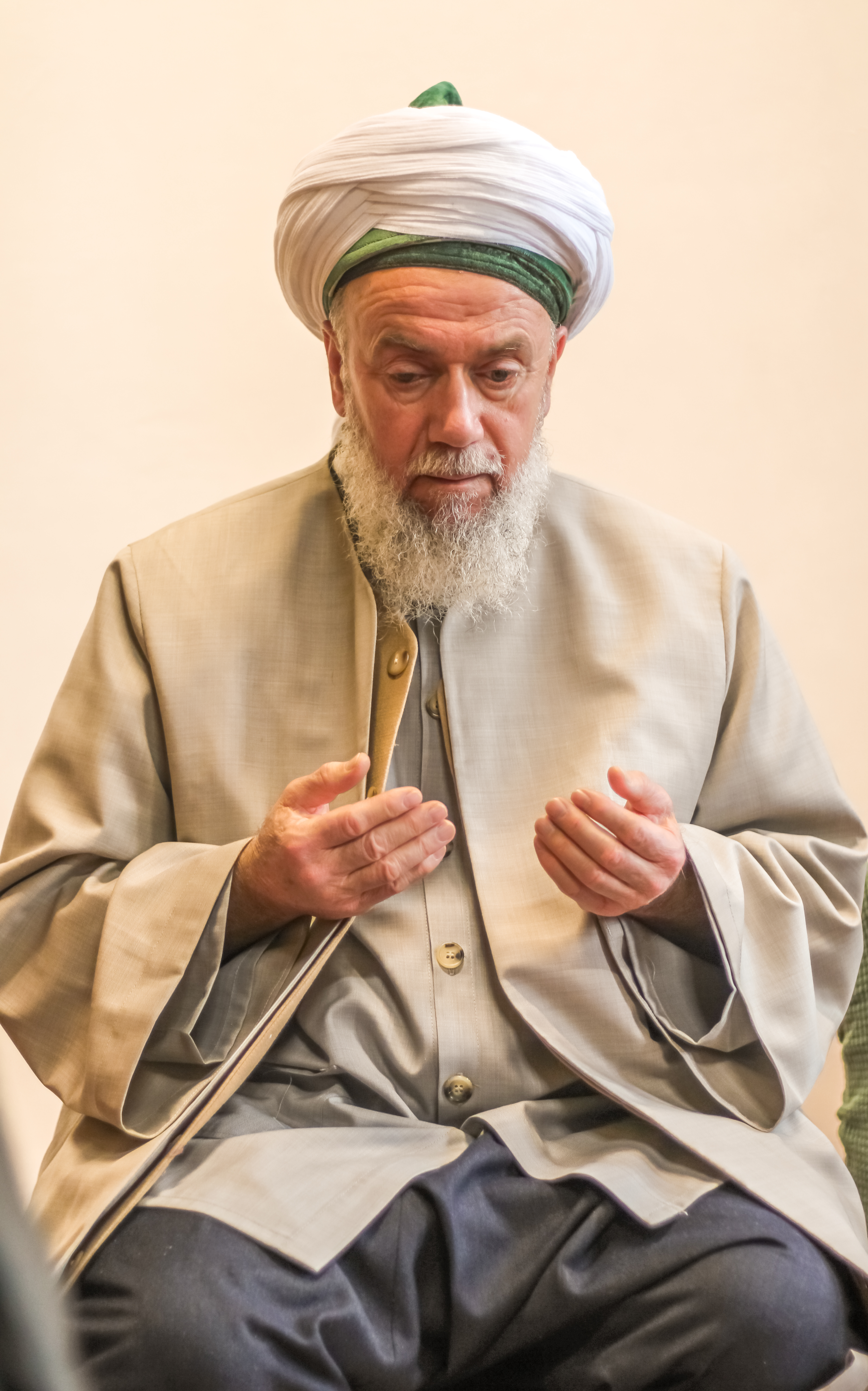

Grand Shaykh (leader) of Naqshbandi Haqqani Sufi Order
- Incumbent
- Assumed office 2014
- Preceded by: Nazim Al-Haqqani

Personal life
- Born: March 29, 1957 (age 69) Damascus, Syrian Republic (now Syria)
- Parents: Nazim Al-Haqqani (father); Amina Adil (mother)

Religious life
- Religion: Islam
- Denomination: Sunni
- Jurisprudence: Hanafi
- Tariqa: Naqashbandi-Haqqani

Muhammad Adil al-Haqqani, also known as Mehmet Âdil, (born 29 March 1957) is a Syrian-born Turkish-Cypriot Sufi religious leader associated with the Naqshbandi-Haqqani Sufi order. He is the eldest son and successor of Nazim Al-Haqqani, and is regarded by followers of the Naqshbandi-Haqqani branch as its spiritual leader. He is based in Akbaba of Beykoz district, Istanbul, Turkey, where he conducts religious gatherings and teachings.

== Early life and education ==
Mehmet Adil was born on 29 March 1957 in Damascus, Syria. He is the eldest son of Nazim Al-Haqqani, a Turkish Cypriot Sufi leader, and Amina Adil. According to biographical accounts published by Naqshbandi-Haqqani organisations, his paternal lineage is traced to Abdul Qadir Gilani, and through him to the Islamic prophet Muhammad. The same account trace his maternal lineage to Jalaluddin Rumi.

His mother, Amina Adil, is daughter of a Tatar family that migrated from territories of the Russian Empire and later the Soviet Union to the Levant, through Anatolia. According to these accounts, her family originated from the Orenburg Bakey area of present-day Tatarstan, Russia. The cause of the migration is described by these sources due to the religious restriction and anti-religious policies of communist governments during the 20th century.

Mehmet Adil spent his childhood and youth in Damascus, where he studied Islamic subjects and the Naqshbandi tradition. He studied under his father, Nazim al-Haqqani, and the Sufi scholar Abdullah ad-Daghistani. He subsequently received advanced Islamic education at the al-Fatih Islamic Institute in Damascus.

== Religious career ==
According to accounts associated with the Naqshbandi-Haqqani order, Nazim al-Haqqani, in 2011, declared Mehmet Adil as his successor (khalifa). Following Nazim's death on 7 May 2014, Adil assumed leadership of the Naqshbandi-Haqqani branch and has been described withing the order as the 41st shaykh of its Naqshbandi-Haqqani Golden Chain.

Mehmet Adil resides in the village of Akbaba of Beykoz district, Istanbul, Turkey. where he conducts religious gathering and receive the followers of the order.

In 2026 edition of The 500 Most Influential Muslims published by Royal Islamic Strategic Studies Centre in Amman, Mehmet Adil is named under Türkiye mentioning him as successor and global leader of Naqshbandi-Haqqani order.

Adil's activities include religious instruction, sermons, and meetings with followers of the order. He has travelled internationally in connection with the order and its communities. His international travels include visits to the Palestinian territories in 2019, Sri Lankan cities in 2023, including Colombo, Kandy, and Galle.

=== 2019 visit to the Palestinian territories ===
From 21 to 23 September 2019, Adil visited the Palestinian territories accompanied by followers of the Naqshbandi-Haqqani order. During the visit, he travelled to several Islamic and other religious sites, including the Cave of the Patriarchs in Hebron, Al-Aqsa Mosque in Jerusalem, sites in Nablus, and locations in Ramallah and Jericho.

The visit attracted varying reactions. The Higher Islamic Sufi Council presented it as an expression of solidarity with Palestinian Muslims and an effort to strengthen international Sufi ties. Other commentators interpreted the visit in the context of the political dispute over Jerusalem and relations between the Palestinian Authority and Hamas. Adil's visit also drew criticism from some Islamist and Salafi groups opposed to Muslim visits to Israel, which they regarded as contributing to normalization with Israel.
