= Near East University Hospital =

- Yakın Doğu Üniversitesi Hastanesi

Geography
- Location: North Nicosia, Lefkoşa District, Cyprus
- Coordinates: 35.228731°N 33.319781°E

Organisation
- Care system: Private / Social Security
- Type: General, Teaching
- Affiliated university: Near East University

Services
- Emergency department: Yes
- Beds: 500

History
- Founded: 2010

Links
- Website: http://www.neareasthospital.com
- Lists: Hospitals in Cyprus

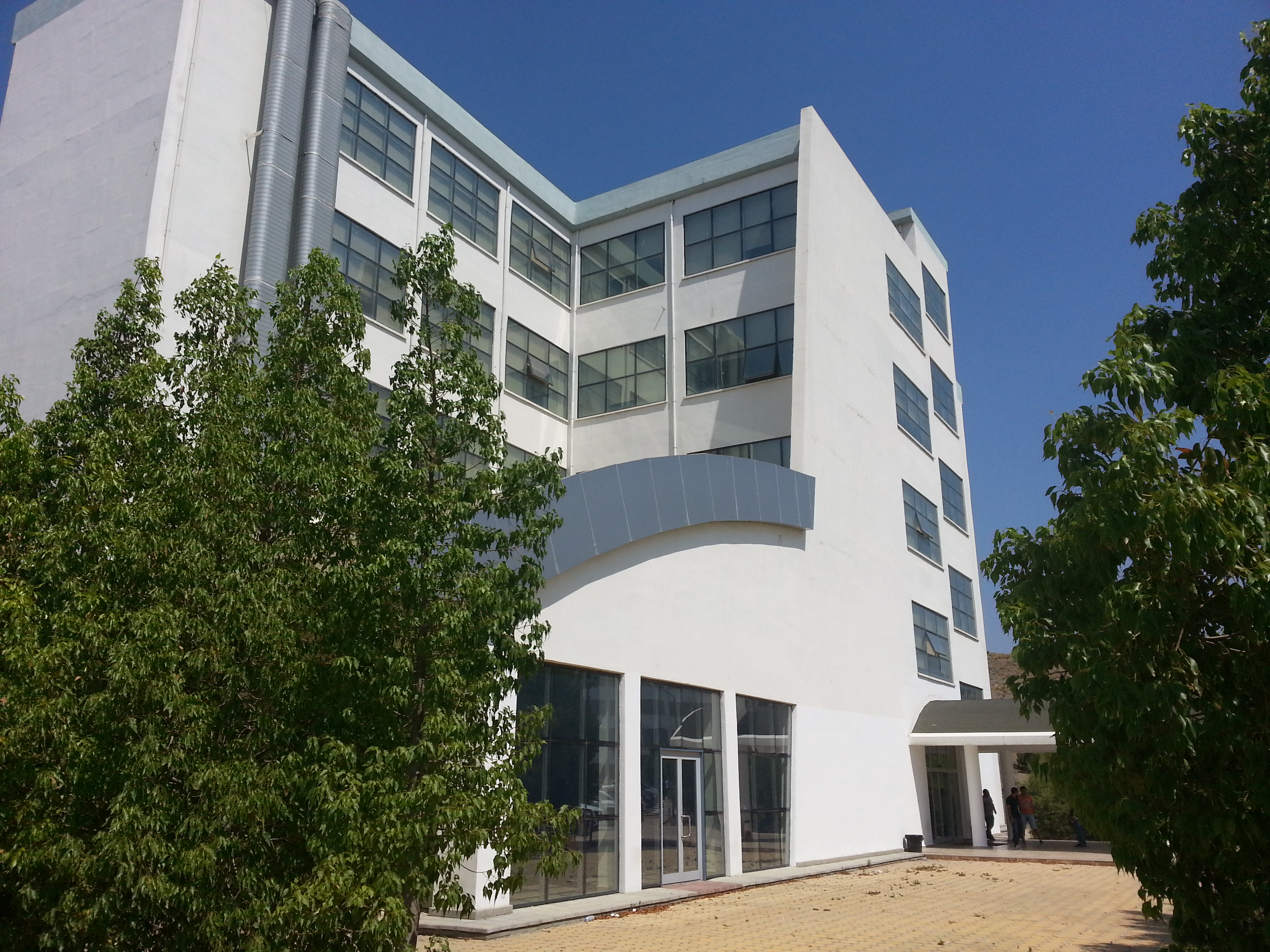

Near East University Hospital is the largest and one of the leading medical facilities in North Nicosia, Northern Cyprus. It is affiliated with the Near East University Faculty of Medicine.

== History ==
Near East University Hospital officially opened its doors to public on 20 July 2010 with a grand opening party that hosted Turkish Minister of Justice, Cemil Cicek, and Turkish Republic of Northern Cyprus President Dervis Eroglu.

== Facilities ==
The NEU Hospital has a 55,000 square-meter closed area with 209 private single patient rooms, 8 operating theatres, 30-bed Intensive Care Unit, 17-bed Neonatal Intensive Care Unit, laboratories and a cutting-edge diagnostic imaging center. To fulfil the diverse needs of the international patients an "International Patient Coordination Center" has been created. This facility arranges and coordinates the transfer of international patients and their companions to and from North Cyprus.

Internal Medical Sciences	Surgical Medical Sciences	Other Department
Department of Cardiology	Anaesthesiology and Reanimation	Algology
Department of Physical Medicine and Rehabilitation	Brain and Neurosurgery	Blood Bank
Dermatology and Venereology	Cardio Vascular Surgery	Check-Up Center
Emergency Medicine	Ear, Nose and Throat	Intensive Care Units
Forensic Medicine	General Surgery	Laboratories
Internal Medicine	Obstetric and Gynecology	Nutrition and Dietetics
Medical Genetics	Ophthalmology	Oral Diseases and Dentistry
Medical Pathology	Orthopedics and Traumatology	Radiology
Neurology	Pediatric Surgery	
Pediatrics	Plastic, Reconstructive and Anesthetic Surgery	
Psychiatry Department	Thoracic Surgery	
Radiation Oncology	Urology	
Sports Medicine		
Thoracic Diseases		

== Landmarks ==
- Near East University Faculty of Medicine accepted to World Health Organization Avicenna Directories.
- Business Initiative Directions 2013 International Arch of Europe Award, a vanity award
