= Amina Adil =

Tatar writer, theologian

- Born: c. 1930
- Died: 16 November 2004
- Occupations: Writer and Islamic theologian

Amina Adil (Tatar: Әминә Гадил, Turkish: Emine Âdil; c. 1930 – 16 November 2004) was a Tatar writer and Islamic theologian.

== Biography ==
Amina was born as one of four children in an Islamic Tataric family in Kazan, TASSR, UdSSR. Due to harassment from the Communist regime, the family fled first to Eleşkirt, and then to Erzurum in Turkey. After 10 years they migrated from there to Damascus.

She married Sheikh Muhammad Nazim and had four children, two girls and two boys.

== Published works ==
- Muhammad the Messenger of Islam: His Life & Prophecy by Hajjah Amina Adil ISBN 978-1930409118 (Jan 1, 2012)
- Lore of Light by Hajjah Adil ISBN 978-1930409651 (Oct 13, 2008)
- My Little Lore of Light by Karima Sperling and Hajjah Amina Adil ISBN 978-1930409675 (Feb 1, 2009)
