= Sufi Muslim Council =

British Mystical Islamic Religious Organization

The Sufi Muslim Council (SMC) was a non-profit, non-governmental religious organization dedicated to working for the cause of Islam, launched on 19 July 2006.

The group claims to represent British Sufi Barelvi Muslims. Sufism is a form of Islamic mysticism. Sufi orders (Tariqas) can be found in Sunni, Shia and other Islamic groups. The 14th Century Arab historian Ibn Khaldun described Sufism as: "dedication to worship, total dedication to Allah most High, disregard for the finery and ornament of the world, abstinence from the pleasure, wealth, and prestige sought by most men, and retiring from others to worship alone".

The group claims that up to 80% of Britain's 2 million Muslims come from the Sufi tradition, which is a mystical and personal interpretation of Islam and largely apolitical. However, the figure has been challenged by the group's critics.

== Sufi Muslim Council: mission statement ==
The SMC was launched with the backing of the government and other faith groups. Politicians from the Labour party welcomed the establishment of the group. The SMC states that it differs from the plethora of other British Islamic groups in that its approach to Islam is less political and hence less confrontational. It tends to view British Muslims as part of mainstream British society rather than separate from it. The group is widely perceived to act as a counter to the Muslim Council of Britain. However its use of the term "Sufi" (i.e. Islamic mystic) has raised important questions about its authenticity in the Muslim community. Traditional Sufi Orders in Islam (called "tariqahs") are defined by their hagiographic genealogy ("silsile") which they trace back to Muhammad and this is considered the criterion of their authenticity in the eyes of the community. The absence of any silsile (or even reference to it) anywhere in the SMC's literature has led to serious doubts over its true mystical pedigree and has increased suspicions over its political agenda. Furthermore, in the science and tradition of Tasawwuf, or Sufism, any self-reference as an individual or group as a 'Sufi' is considered presumptious and arrogant. Isolating Sufism as a sect of Muslims rather than a tradition of self growth and spiritual refinement is also alien to Tasawwuf.

== The Sufi Muslim Council and Islamic extremism ==
The SMC has taken a strong stand against radical Islamic extremism prevalent amongst some Muslim youth in the UK, as illustrated by the 7/7 terrorist attacks carried out by predominantly by young Muslims of British Pakistani descent. In its website the group states: "While every religion rejects acts of tyranny, injustice and oppression, extremism is found in every religion. As Muslims we are supporters of love, peace, justice, respect and tolerance. Thus, we see it as our duty to continue to shed light on current events while doing our best to see that the wave of militant radicalism sweeping Muslim nations does not strike again in UK, where we live."

== Rivalry between the Sufi Muslim Council and the Muslim Council of Britain ==
Given their different approaches to expressing the religion of Islam, both the SMC and the MCB have criticized each other regarding the extent to which unelected community organizations can fight Islamic extremism and alienation from the mainstream. The MCB has dismissed the SMC as 'unrepresentative and divisive'. Meanwhile, the SMC has accused existing organizations for not doing enough to engage with and tackle radicalism within British Muslim communities.

== Bibliography ==
- Stjernholm, Simon (October 2010). "Sufi politics in Britain: the Sufi Muslim Council and the 'silent majority' of Muslims". Journal of Islamic Law and Culture. 12 (3): 215–226. doi:10.1080/1528817X.2010.618025. ISSN 1528-817X.
