= Islamic Supreme Council of America =

Islamic organization based in the United States

The Islamic Supreme Council of America (ISCA) is a Muslim religious organization in the United States, founded in 1998 by Shaykh Hisham Kabbani, who was also its first chairman. The council describes itself as "dedicated to educating Muslims and non-Muslims alike, and developing good citizenry through the teaching of moral excellence".

ISCA is based in Fenton, Michigan.

== Aims ==
The ISCA sees its mission in part to "work closely and proactively with non-Muslim individuals and organizations to present Islam as a religion of moderation, tolerance, peace and justice". It stresses "the common heritage of Islam, Christianity and Judaism in an effort to foster mutual respect between all cultures and religions". It also seeks to "integrate traditional scholarship in resolving contemporary issues affecting the maintenance of Islamic beliefs in a modern, secular society". The Council states that it promotes traditional Islamic legal rulings, and that it explicitly rejects puritanical forms of Islam, such as the Wahhabi Islam practiced by Saudi Arabia, the Taliban, and many terrorist organizations who espouse Islamist ideologies.

Shaykh Hisham Kabbani, founding member and current chairman of ISCA, is critical of the Council on American-Islamic Relations (CAIR) and the American Muslim Council, saying, "There are many Muslim organizations that claim to speak on behalf of the Muslim community but that in reality are not moderate, but extremist."

As of 23 September 2009, the ISCA website features photos of its officials meeting with George W. Bush, the US Joint Chiefs of Staff, and UK Crown Prince Charles. The ISCA has been praised by Daniel Pipes, who describes it as "relatively small".
