= Nazim Al-Haqqani =

Naqshbandi Sufi leader (1922–2014)

Mawlana Shaykh Muhammad Nazim Adil al-Haqqani
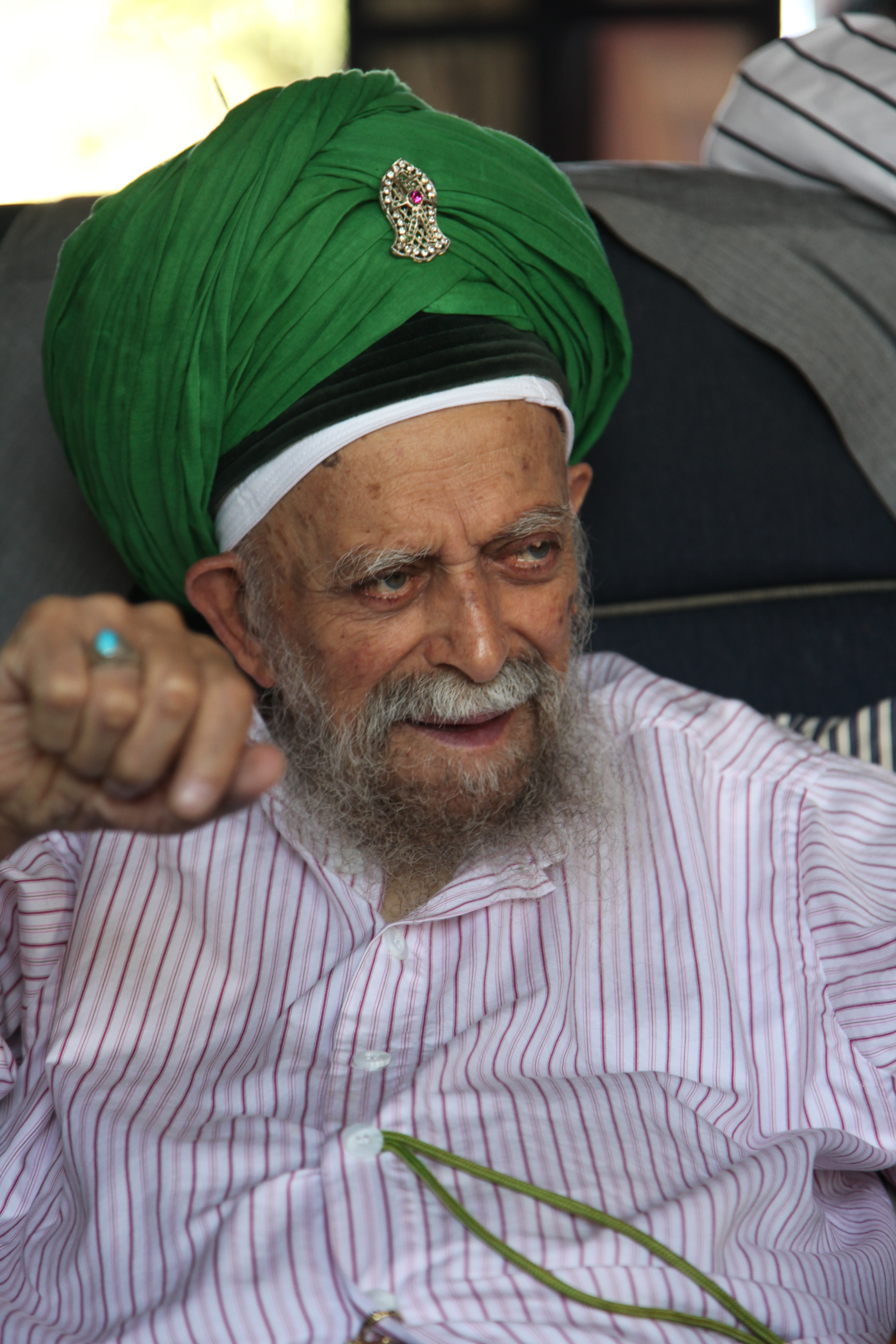

Grand Shaykh (leader) of Naqshbandi Haqqani Sufi Order
- In office 1973–2014
- Preceded by: Abdullah ad-Daghistani
- Succeeded by: Mehmet Adil

Grand Mufti of Northern Cyprus

Personal life
- Born: Mehmet Nâzım Âdil; 21 April 1922 Larnaca, British Cyprus
- Died: 7 May 2014 (aged 92) North Nicosia, Northern Cyprus
- Spouse: Amina Adil
- Children: Mehmet Adil; Bahauddin Adil; Naziha Adil; Rukiye Adil
- Occupation: Sufi spiritual leader

Religious life
- Religion: Islam
- Denomination: Sunni
- Jurisprudence: Hanafi
- Tariqa: Naqshbandi Haqqani

Muslim leader
- Disciple of: Abdullah ad-Daghistani
- Influenced: Rank Nazeer Ahmed, Mehmet Adil, John G. Bennett

Muhammad Nazim Adil al-Qubrusi al-Haqqani (Note: Turkish: Muhammed Nâzım Âdil El-Kıbrısî Hakkanî) (born Mehmet Nâzım Âdil; 21 April 1922 – 7 May 2014), commonly known as Shaykh Nazim, (Note: Turkish: Şeyh Nâzım) was a Turkish Cypriot Sufi Muslim leader and scholar. He was the spiritual leader (Grand Shaykh) of the Haqqani branch of the Naqshbandi order (tariqa) of Sufism.

== Names ==
Nazim al-Haqqani was active both in Turkish and Arabic language contexts. His name has been transliterated into English in several forms: Nazim al-Qubrusi (Turkish: Nâzım Kıbrısî), indicating his homeland of Cyprus (Turkish: Kıbrıs), and Muhammad Nazım 'Adil al-Qubrusi al-Haqqani an-Naqshbandi (Arabic: محمد ناظم عادل القبرصي الحقاني النقشبندي).

== Personal life ==
Nazim al-Haqqani was born Mehmet Nâzım Âdil on 21 April 1922. Through his paternal grandfather Yeshilbash Hussayn al-Qadiri, he was said to traced his lineage to Abdul Qadir Gilani, while through his maternal grandfather Kaytazzâde Mehmet Nâzım (after whom he was named) his family traced its lineage to Jalal al-Din Rumi.

In 1940, he moved to Istanbul, Turkey, where he enrolled at Istanbul University to study chemical engineering. He later stated that he felt no attraction to modern science and that his interests were instead directed toward the spiritual sciences.

He married Amina Adil, the daughter of a Sufi follower in Damascus. They had two daughters and two sons, Mehmet Adil and Bahauddin, both of whom are active in Sufi activities and accompanied their father on a preaching tour through Asia in 2001.

== Studies in Sharia' and Sufism ==
Nazim al-Haqqani studied Classical Arabic and Fiqh (Islamic Jurisprudence) in Istanbul under Jamal al-Din al-Alsuni (d. 1955), from whom he received an ijaza (license to teach) these subjects. He was initiated in Naqshbandi Sufi order by Sulayman Arzarumi (d. 1948), who later directed him to continue his studies in Damascus, Syria. He left Istanbul in 1944 and was able to enter Damascus in 1945, following the end of World War II. He also spent a few years in Homs studying under various Ulamah including Shaykh Muhammad Ali Ayun al-Sud and his son, Shaykh Abdul Aziz Uyun al-Sud, Shaykh Abdal Jalil al-Murad and Shaykh Sa'id al-Sibai.

In Damascus he met Abdullah al-Faiz ad-Daghistani, with whom he exchanged the Bay'ah (Islamic oath of allegiance). He trained him well in Naqshbandi Sufi path. Abdullah ad-Daghistani became his principal Murshid (spiritual guide) until his death in 1973.

== Islamic missionary activity ==
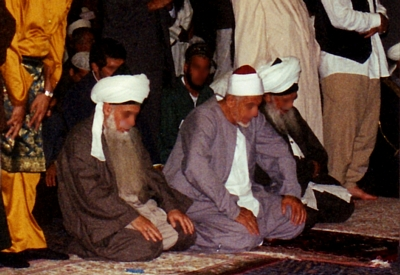
Nazim al-Haqqani (far right) in prayer with Hisham Kabbani (left) at an Islamic conference in 1996.

Nazim returned to Cyprus, where he began Islamic missionary activity. During this period, he came into conflict with the Kemalist governing body of the island's Turkish community, which, in line with Kemalist ideology, sought to secularize the society. Laws had been enacted that prohibited the public recitation of the Islamic call to prayer (adhan) in its traditional Arabic form. Nazim nevertheless continued to perform the adhan in Arabic. This situation was resolved after the rise to power of Adnan Menderes in Turkey, whose government adopted a more tolerant approach towards Islamic traditions.

In 1952, Nazim moved to Damascus to continue his studies with ad-Daghistani, while continuing to spend three months or more each year in his native Cyprus.

Following the death of ad-Daghistani in 1973, Nazim was regarded as his spiritual successor. In 1974, he began to visit Western Europe, visiting London annually, during the month of Ramadan. During these visits he attracted a substantial following among spiritual seekers from Western Europe and North America, many of whom converted to Islam after encountering his teaching. From 1980 onwards, his lectures on Islam and Sufism were published in English and other European languages.

Nazim's ability to communicate in English, Turkish, Arabic, and Greek helped facilitate his transnational appeal.

In 2010, Nazim gained attention when 33 Chilean miners, who had been trapped underground for more than two months following a mine collapse, visited him to express gratitude for his spiritual support. Some of the miners reported having visions in which Nazim encouraged them to remain strong and reassured them that they would be rescued.

Notable students and followers of Al-Haqqani include John G. Bennett, a British writer on spirituality, and Rank Nazeer Ahmed, an Indian Muslim scholar and legislator. He also maintained ties with contemporary scholars such as Ali al-Jifri, Umar bin Hafiz, Hamza Yusuf, Kadhim al Saqqaf.

== Political opinions ==
Nazim was involved in political matters and maintained connections with several prominent politicians, including the late president of Turkey, Turgut Özal, and the Turkish Cypriot president, Rauf Denktaş. Born shortly before the fall of the Ottoman Empire, he praised Ottoman history and civilization, contrasting its culture the modern-day Republic of Turkey.

In 1994, Nazim addressed a conference organized by the Welfare Party in Antwerp, Belgium, where the audience included politicians such as Abdullah Gül, Recep Tayyip Erdoğan, and Necmettin Erbakan. In his speech, he emphasized the importance of Islamic values and spoke favourably of the Ottoman Caliphate.

== Controversial statements ==
Nazim made statements that attracted attention and debate. In March 2003, he declared that then-US President George W. Bush and British Prime Minister Tony Blair had achieved sainthood in Islam, suggesting that their actions in the Middle East were divinely guided and part of a mission to combat tyranny. These remarks attracted widespread criticism, particularly given the controversy surrounding the Iraq War and its aftermath.

In 1996, Nazim reportedly claimed that Prince Charles (now Charles III) had secretly converted to Islam. He was quoted as saying:

"Did you know that Prince Charles has converted to Islam? Yes, yes. He is a Muslim. I can't say more. But it happened in Turkey. Oh, yes, he converted all right. When you get home check on how often he travels to Turkey. You'll find that your future king is a Muslim."

These remarks were widely disputed. Buckingham Palace dismissed them as "nonsense," and constitutional expert Lord St. John of Fawsley emphasized that Prince Charles was a loyal member of the Church of England.

== Later life ==
Later in life, Nazim received visitors at his home in Lefke, Cyprus. In 2010, he briefly met former Pope Benedict XVI during the pontiff’s visit to Cyprus, as the pope was walking in a procession to a Mass near the UN controlled buffer zone that separates the Turkish Cypriot north and Greek Cypriot south of the island.

He was frequently included in The 500 Most Influential Muslims, an annual publication by the Royal Islamic Strategic Studies Centre, often appearing within the top 50 positions. In the 2013-2014 edition, he was ranked 42nd.

In 2011, Nazim stated that his son, Mehmet Adil, would succeed him as leader of the order.

== Death ==
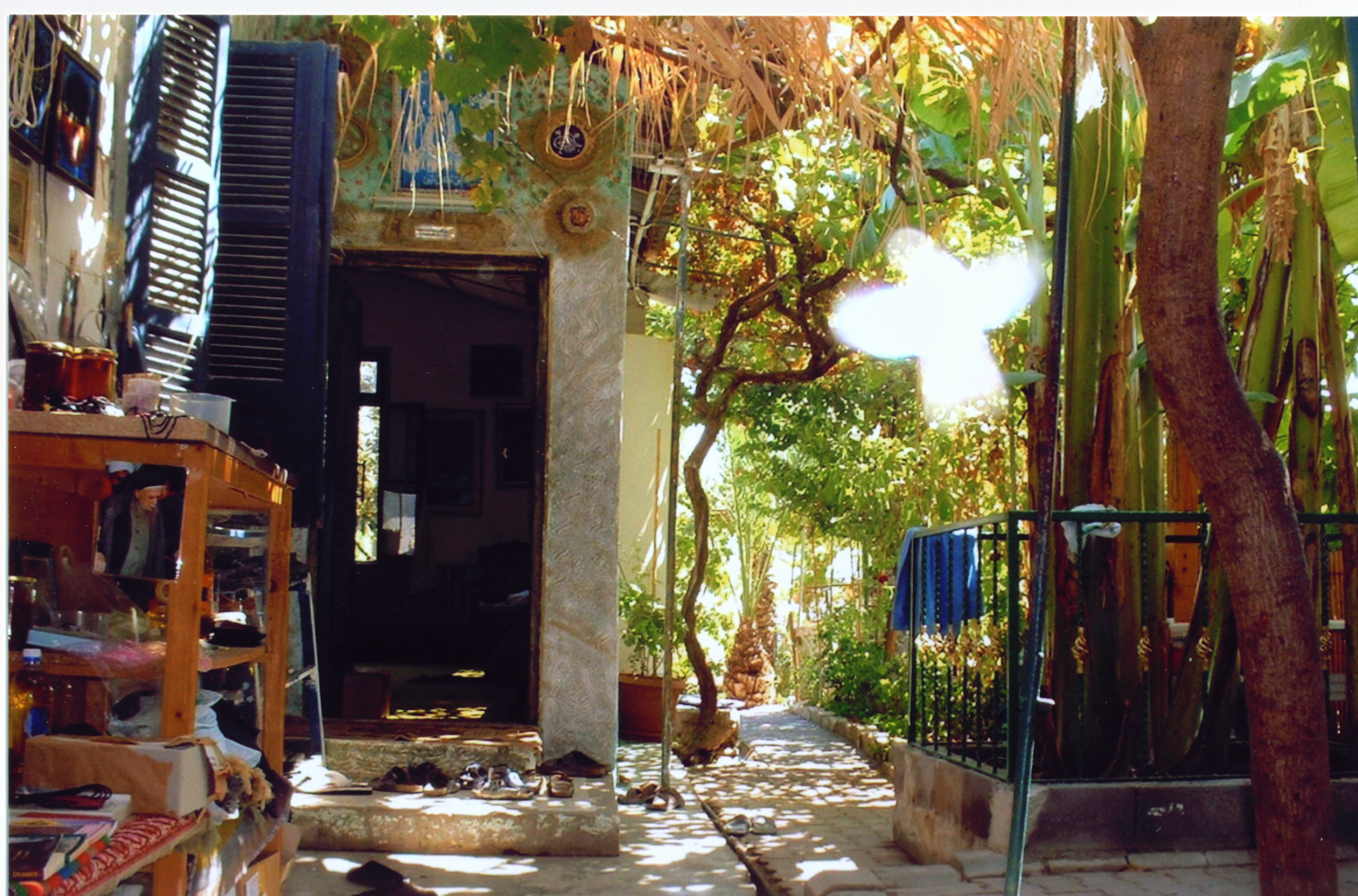
Courtyard of Nazim's Sufi lodge and burial shrine, Lefke, Northern Cyprus.

Nazim had been receiving medical care since 17 April 2014, when he was admitted from his home in Lefke to the Near East University Hospital in North Nicosia, Northern Cyprus, after suffering from Kidney and respiratory failure. He died on 7 May 2014, (Note: corresponding to 8 Rajab 1435 AH) aged 92.

== Published works ==
- al-Qubrusi, Nazim. 1980. Mercy Oceans: The teachings of Maulana Abdullah al-Faizi ad-Daghestani. n.p.
- Daghistānī, ʻAbd Allāh al-Naqshbandī, and Nazim Haqqani. 1980. Mercy oceans: Winter lectures 1400 H. (1980 A. D.); Book two. Konya, Turkey: Sebat.
- al-Qubrusi, Nazim 'Adil. 1982. Mercy Oceans' Endless Horizons; Summer lectures from 1981. Konya, Turkei: Sebat Offset Pr.
- al-Qubrusi, Nazim 'Adil. 1983. Mercy Oceans' Pink Pearls. Konya, Turkei: Sebat Offset Pr.
- Haqqani, Nazim. 1984. Mercy oceans' divine sources: The discourses of our master Shaykh Nazim Al-Qubrusi (Imam ul-Haqqaniyyin). Konya, Turkey: Sebat.
- –––. 1985. Mercy oceans of the heart: the discourses of our master Shaykh Nazim Al-Qubrusi (Imam ul-Haqqaniyyin). [Turkey?]: [s.n.].
- al-Qubrusi, Nazim 'Adil. 1986. Mercy Oceans Rising Sun. Konya, Turkey: Sebat.
- Haqqani, Nazim. 1987. The secrets behind the secrets behind the secrets. Berlin: Duru.
- al-Qubrusi, Nazim 'Adil. Toward the Divine Presence: Book one, London Talks, Summer 1984. n.p.n.d.
- Haqqani, Nazim. 1987. Mercy oceans' lovestream: the discourses of our master Shaykh Nazim al-Qubrusi al-Haqqani delivered by the permission of his Grandsheikh Shaykh Abdullah Ad-Daghistani; Selected lectures Summer 1406 A. H. (1986 C. E.); London, Germany, Switzerland. Konya: Sebat.
- Haqqani, Nazim. 1987. Mercy oceans: Serendib edition; Transcript of lectures. Colombo: Council of Thareeqathun Naqshbandhia.
- Al-Qubrusi, Shaykh Nazim 'Adil. 1988. Mercy Oceans' Hidden Treasures, 2nd ed. Konya, Turkey: Sebat.
- Daghistānī, ʻAbd Allāh al-Naqshbandī, Nazim Haqqani. 1988. The Naqshbandi way: a guidebook for spiritual progress; The spiritual exercises of the Naqshbandi Sufi path according to the instructions of Sultan Ul-Awliya Shaykh Abdullah Ad-Daghistani. Konya, Turkey: Mercy Oceans publications.
- An-Naqshabandi, Shaykh Nazim 'Adil Al-Haqqani. 1989. Mercy Oceans Saphires from Serendib. Colombo, Sri Lanka: Arafat Publishing House.
- Naqshbandi, Muhammad Nazim 'Adil al-Haqqani. 1990. From Dunya to Maule: (from here to hereafter). İstanbul: Sebil Yayınevi.
- An-Naqshabandi, Shaykh Nazim 'Adil Al-Haqqani. 1990. Mercy Oceans' Emeralds of Eden: Lectures of a Sufi Grandsheikh. Colombo, Sri Lanka: Peacock Printers.
- –––. 1992. Natural medicines. London: Ta-Ha.
- Naqshbandi, Muhammad Nazim 'Adil al-Haqqani. 1994. Mystical secrets of the last days. Los Altos, CA: Haqqani Islamic Trust for New Muslims.
- Haqqani Naqshbandia, Shaykh Nazim al al-. 1994. Keys to paradise. London: Zero Productions.
- Naqshbandi, Muhammad Nazim 'Adil al-Haqqani. 1994. The divine kingdom. Los Altos, CA: Haqqani Islamic Trust for New Muslims.
- Haqqani, Sheik Nazim. 1995. Natural medicines: traditional Sufi healing methods. London: Zero Productions.
- al-Haqqani, Nazim. 1995. Power oceans of light. London: Zero Publications.
- Naqshbandi, Muhammad Nazim 'Adil al-Haqqani. 1995. When will peace come to earth?: Oh people, don't waste. London: Zero Productions.
- Haqqani, Nazim. 1996. Secret desires: talks given in 1996 in Germany and Great Britain by a sufi master of our time. London: Zero Productions.
- Naqshbandi, Muhammad Nazim 'Adil al-Haqqani. 1997. Defending truth: associations with a Sufi master of our time. London: Zero Productions.
- Nāẓim ʻAdl al-Ḥaqqānī, Muḥammad. 1997. Islam the freedom to serve: Suhbats, aphorisms, and stories. Bonndorf im Schwarzwald: Gorski und Spohr.
- al-Haqqani, Shaykh Nazim. 1998. Pure hearts. London: Zero Productions.
- Naqshbandi, Muhammad Nazim 'Adil al-Haqqani. 1998. Secret desires. London: Healing Hearts / Zero Productions.
- –––. 1998. Star from heaven: talks given in 1995 by a Sufi master of our time in England, Germany, Switzerland and Italy. London: Zero Productions.
- Sheikh Muhammad Nazim Al Haqqani, and Khairiyah Siegel, 1999, "On the Bridge to Eternity", the millennium book
- –––. 2002. In the mystic footsteps of saints. 2 vols. Fenton Mich: Naqshbandi Haqqani Sufi Order.
- Al-Haqqani, Shaykh Nazim 'Adil. 2002–2007. Liberating the soul: a guide for spiritual growth. 6 vols. [S.l.]: Islamic Supreme Council of America.
- Naqshbandi, Muhammad Nazim 'Adil al-Haqqani, and Muhammad Hisham Kabbani. 2004. Naqshbandi awrad of Mawláná Shaykh Muhammad Nazim 'Adil al-Haqqani. Fenton, MI: Islamic Supreme Council of America.
- Naqshbandi, Muhammad Nazim 'Adil al-Haqqani. 2006. The path to spiritual excellence. Fenton, MI: Islamic Supreme Council of America.
- Naqshbandi, Muhammad Nazim 'Adil al-Haqqani. 2007. Through the eye of the needle: Counsel for Spiritual Survival in the Last Days. Fenton, Mich: Institute for Spiritual & Cultural Advancement.
- Al-Haqqani, Mawláná Shaykh Nazim, and Hamidah Torres. 2008. Sufi spiritual practices for polishing the mirror in the heart. [Mar de Plata, Argentina]: SereSereS.
- Al-Haqqani, Mawláná Shaykh Nazim. 2008. Love sufi teachings and spiritual practices. Málaga: SereSereS.
- Naqshbandi, Muhammad Nazim 'Adil al-Haqqani. 2010. The Sufilive series. Fenton, MI: Institute for Spiritual and Cultural Advancement (ISCA).
- Naqshbandi, Muhammad Nazim 'Adil al-Haqqani, and Muhammad Hisham Kabbani. 2010. Spiritual discourses of Sultan al-Awliya Mawláná Shaykh Muhammad Nazim 'Adil Al-Haqqani. Fenton, MI: Institute for Spiritual and Cultural Advancement (ISCA).
- –––. 2010. Breaths from beyond the curtain: spiritual guidance of the Naqshbandi Sufi Masters. Fenton, Mich: Institute for Spiritual and Cultural Advancement.
- Shaykh Nazim, over 2,000 pieces of unique video content: Sheikh Nazım Al Haqqani Al Qubrusi An Naqshibandi
