= Hisham Kabbani =

Lebanese-American Islamic scholar (1945–2024)

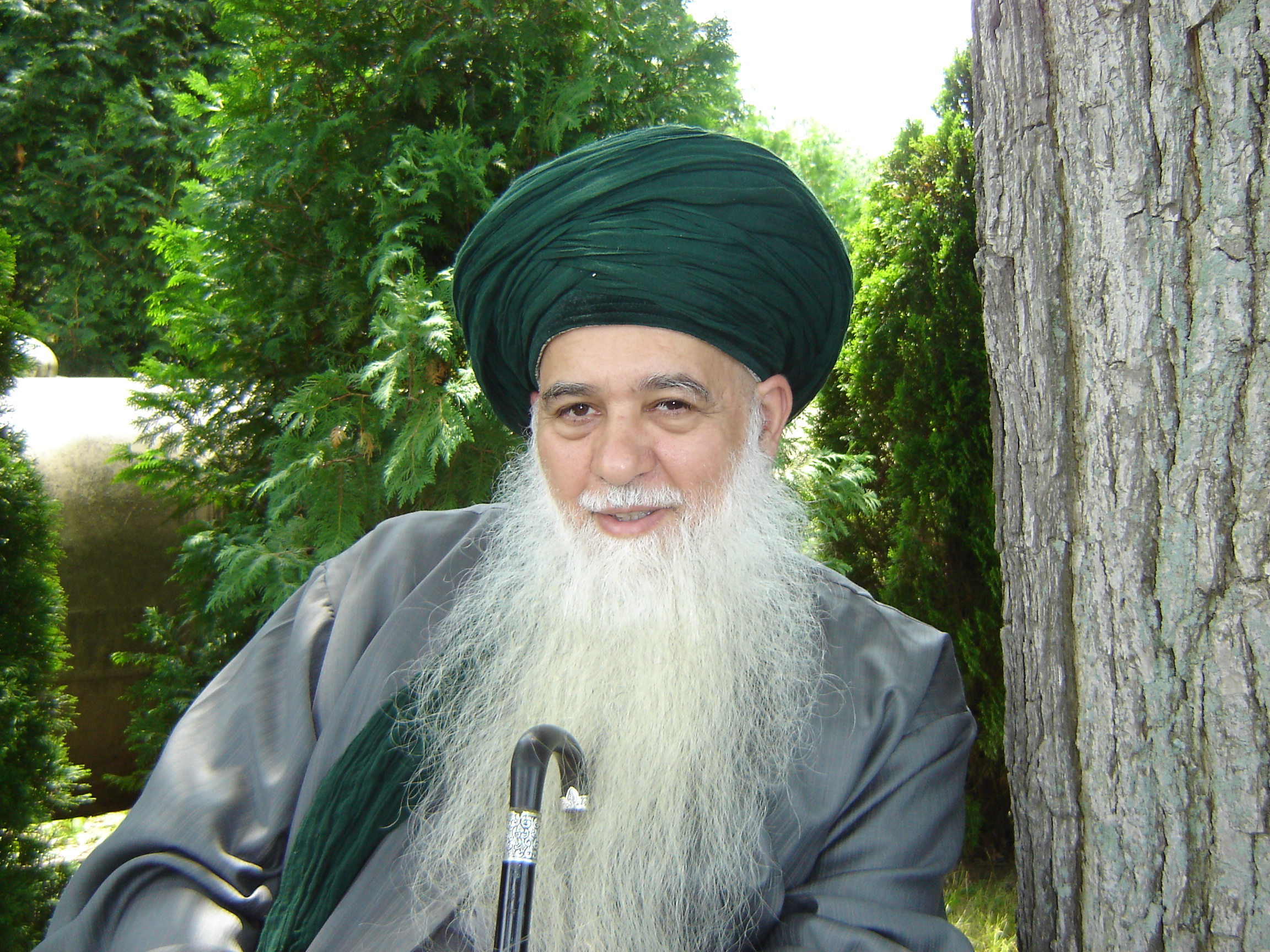
- Kabbani in 2007
- Born: 28 January 1945; Beirut, Lebanon
- Died: 4 December 2024 (aged 79); Fenton, Michigan
- Spouse: Hajjah Naziha Adil
- Website: HishamKabbani.com

Hisham Kabbani (28 January 1945 – 4 December 2024) was a Lebanese-American Sunni Sufi Muslim scholar belonging to the Naqshbandi Haqqani Sufi order. Kabbani has counseled and advised Muslim leaders to build community resilience against violent extremism. In 2012, the Royal Islamic Strategic Studies Centre named him on The 500 Most Influential Muslims.

== Biography ==
Shaykh Kabbani was born in Beirut, Lebanon. Upon the order of Shaykh Nazim, Shaykh Kabbani relocated to the United States in 1990.

Shaykh Muhammad Hisham Kabbani was married to Hajjah Naziha Adil. Hajjah Naziha was the eldest child of Shaykh Muhammad Nazim Adil and Hajjah Amina bint Ayesha, a Shaykha and Islamic scholar who wrote extensively on lives of the prophets, and whose family escaped religious persecution in Tatarstan, Russia.

Kabbani died in December 2024, at the age of 79.

== Activities ==
Shaykh Hisham and Hajjah Naziha have directed various emergency disaster relief and humanitarian aid projects in Somalia, Indonesia, Pakistan, Afghanistan, and Turkey.

Kabbani was also a member of the Elijah Interfaith Institute Board of World Religious Leaders. Shaykh Hisham Kabbani has held meetings with numerous world leaders and has been a key speaker at various conferences, such as the World Economic Forum.

== Fatwas ==
In 2011. Shaykh Kabbani and Homayra Ziad, a professor of Islamic Studies at Trinity College, wrote a fatwa using Quranic exegesis, a review of Hadith, and linguistic analysis to determine that the Quran does not condone domestic violence. According to the authors of the fatwa, the broader message of the Qur'an is the promotion of harmony and affection between husband and wife so that they may develop amongst themselves a sacred bond of love and mercy. They also claim that it was the first modern and formal religious statements to clearly forbid domestic violence. Supporters claim that this fatwa helped encourage women's empowerment in Muslim communities by challenging cultural practices that allowed abuse.

Shaykh Kabbani also wrote a fatwa on the principles of jihad, which was translated into Arabic and distributed by the US military in Iraq.

== Controversy and criticism ==
In 1999, Shaykh Kabbani came into conflict with various Muslim groups including the Islamic Society of North America (ISNA), the Council on American-Islamic Relations (CAIR), and the Islamic Circle of North America (ICNA) after he stated that 80 percent of mosques are being run by "extremist ideologies". Muslim organizations responded harshly, stating that Kabbani's remarks "could have a profoundly negative impact on ordinary American Muslims". Shaykh Kabbani plunged into further controversy when he accused Muslims who advise the United States about Islam as being "extremists themselves". When asked during a conference whether he would name the Islamic groups he believed were "extremist", Kabbani answered, "after the program". When subsequently confronted with the question during the end of the discussion, Kabbani refused to answer. In a joint statement pertaining to Shaykh Kabbani's accusations, several Muslim groups said that "Shaykh Kabbani has put the entire American Muslim community under unjustified suspicion. In effect, Shaykh Kabbani is telling government officials that the majority of American Muslims pose a danger to our society."

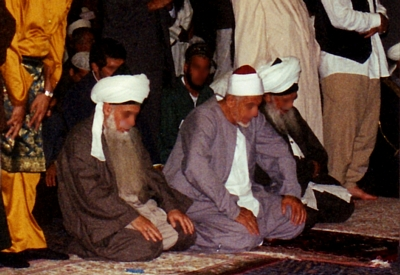
Kabbani (left) with Shaykh Nazim (far right) in prayer at an Islamic conference in 1996.

In his remarks at the State Department that year, Shaykh Kabbani had claimed that 80 percent of the Muslim American population have been introduced to extremist ideology. Shaykh Kabbani claimed the figure was based on his interviews with religious clerics, educators, community members and young Muslims in 114 mosques in the US over an eight-year period (1991–1999). Although the "80%" figure has been widely cited by public officials, and has been repeated by several other reports, a fact check by the Washington Post concluded the statistic has not been confirmed by a quantitative, peer-reviewed study or any other type of evidence.

In his 1999 State Department speech, Shaykh Kabbani claimed that while the majority of Muslim Americans have been exposed to violent extremist ideologies, "not all of them agree with it." Later in the question and answer session he reiterated that the majority of the Muslim community which is "peace loving and tolerant" does not support extremism. In a 2000 interview with the Middle East Quarterly, he clarified his position that "the problem of extremism is not confined to the Muslim community... Extremism is an unwillingness to accept any viewpoint but one's own... Ideological extremism can result in an act of violence when an individual pursues his ideas to such an extreme that he thinks only his ideas are correct and must therefore be enforced on everyone else."

In 2001 and 2002 Shaykh Kabbani was recognized as one of the few Muslim scholars at that time to have warned of the threat of violent extremism.

In the April 2016 issue of Dabiq Magazine, Salafi-Wahhabi terrorist group Islamic State of Iraq and the Levant declared him a Murtad (apostate or blasphemer).

== Published works ==
Works published by Hisham Kabbani
Title	Description
Remembrance of God Liturgy of the Sufi Naqshbandi Masters	ISBN 978-1-871031-58-4 (1994)
The Naqshbandi Sufi Way	ISBN 978-0-934905-34-3 (1995)
Angels Unveiled	ISBN 978-1-930409-37-8 (1996)
Fifty Days: the Divine Disclosures During a Holy Sufi Seclusion	ISBN 978-1-930409-72-9 (2010)
The Prohibition of Domestic Violence	ISBN 978-1-930409-97-2 (2011)
Sufi Science of Self Realization	ISBN 978-1-938058-47-9 (2005)
Encyclopedia of Islamic Doctrine and Beliefs	ISBN 978-1-871031-86-7 (1998)
Call on Me: Powerful Supplications for Healing, Protection & Fulfillment of Needs	ISBN 978-1-938058-51-6 (2003)
The Fiqh of Islam: A Contemporary Explanation of Principles of Worship, 2 volumes	ISBN 978-1-938058-24-0 (2014)
Al-Muslihun: The Peacemakers As Taught In Classical Islam	ISBN 978-1-938058-29-5 (2014)
Healing Verses of Holy Quran & Hadith	ISBN 978-1-938058-12-7 (2013)
Principles of Islamic Spirituality: Contemporary Sufism & Traditional Islamic Healing	ISBN 978-1-938058-22-6 (2013)
The Benefits of Bismillah ir-Rahman ir-Raheem & Surat Al-Fatihah	ISBN 978-1-938058-15-8 (2013)
The Importance of Prophet Muhammad Sallallahu 'alaihi Wa Salam in Our Daily Life, 2 volumes	ISBN 978-1-938058-19-6 (2013)
The Hierarchy of Saints	ISBN 978-1-938058-03-5 (2013)
The Heavenly Power of Divine Obedience and Gratitude	ISBN 978-1-930409-99-6 (2013)
The Dome of Provisions, 2 volumes	ISBN 978-1-930409-88-0 (2013)
Jihad: Principles of Leadership in War and Peace	ISBN 978-1-930409-93-4 (2010)
Fifty Days: the Divine Disclosures During a Holy Sufi Seclusion	ISBN 978-1-930409-72-9 (2010)
Fayd al-Salam (Arabic)	ISBN 978-1-930409-85-9 (2010)
Angels Unveiled, A Sufi Perspective	ISBN 978-1-930409-74-3 (1995)
At the Feet of My Master	ISBN 978-1-930409-69-9 (2009)
The Nine-Fold Ascent	ISBN 978-1-930409-59-0 (2009)
Who Are the Guides	ISBN 978-1-930409-55-2 (2009)
Banquet for the Soul	ISBN 978-1-930409-56-9 (2008)
Symphony of Remembrance	ISBN 978-1-930409-49-1 (2007)
Illuminations: Compiled Lectures on Shariah and Tasawwuf	ISBN 978-1-930409-52-1 (2007)
Universe Rising	ISBN 978-1-930409-48-4 (2007)
Pearls and Coral, 2 volumes	ISBN 978-1-930409-08-8 (2007)
A Spiritual Commentary on the Chapter of Sincerity	ISBN 978-1-930409-42-2 (2006)
Keys to the Divine Kingdom	ISBN 978-1-930409-28-6 (2005)
In the Shadow of Saints	ISBN 978-1-930409-32-3 (2005)
The Naqshbandi Sufi Tradition Guidebook of Daily Practices and Devotions	ISBN 978-1-930409-22-4 (2004)
The Approach of Armageddon? an Islamic Perspective	ISBN 978-1-930409-20-0 (2003)
Angeles Revelados: Una Perspectiva Sufi (Spanish)	ISBN 978-1-930409-37-8 (2016)
Les Anges Révélés (French)	ISBN 978-1-938058-33-2 (2016)

Titles in Islam
Preceded by Position established	Self-Appointed Chairman of the Islamic Supreme Council of America (Self-Appointed Grand Mufti of the United States); 1998–2024	Vacant
