= Naqshbandi Haqqani Sufi Order =

Religious organization

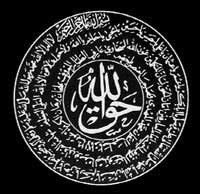
The symbolic emblem of the Naqshbandi-Haqqani Sufi Order.

The Naqshbandi Haqqani Sufi Order is an organization which claims to adhere to the Naqshbandi Tariqa. It is named after its founder, Nazim Adil al-Qubrusi al-Haqqani. The Naqshbandi Haqqani Sufi Order of America (NQSOA) is an educational organization dedicated to spreading the teachings of the Naqshbandi Haqqani Sufi Order in America, under the guidance of the leader of the order, Mehmet Adil ar-Rabbani who is the son and successor of Nazim Adil al-Qubrusi al-Haqqani.

== Mission ==
According to its official website: "The mission of the Naqshbandi-Haqqani Sufi Order of America is to spread the Sufi teachings of the brotherhood of mankind and the Unity of belief in God that is present in all religions and spiritual paths. Its efforts are directed at bringing the diverse spectrum of religions and spiritual paths into harmony and concord, in recognition of mankind's responsibility as caretaker of this fragile planet and of one another."

== Activities ==
In spreading the Sufi teachings, NQSOA has employed a variety of means, including a strong web presence, a publications department, and ongoing teaching and worship activities at its 13 centers in America.

== See also ==
- Naqshbandi-Haqqani Golden Chain
