= List of modern Sufi scholars =

Contemporary Sufi Scholars

This article is a List of modern Sufi scholars. The Sufis in the list were known in the 20th century or later. They are grouped geographically.

== Arabian Peninsula ==
- Abdallah Bin Bayyah (born 1935) – Saudi Arabia
- Habib Ali al-Jifri (born 1971) – Yemen
- Habib Umar bin Hafiz (born 1962) – Yemen
- Muhammad Alawi al-Maliki (1944–2004) – Saudi Arabia

== Levant ==
- Abd al-Rahman al-Shaghouri (1912–2004) – Syria
- Mohamed Said Ramadan Al-Bouti (1929–2013) – Syria
- Muhammad al-Yaqoubi (born 1963) – Syria
- Nuh Ha Mim Keller (born 1954) – Jordan
- Wahba Zuhayli (1932–2015) – Syria
- Yusuf an-Nabhani (1849–1932) – Palestine

== North Africa ==
- Abd al-Aziz al-Ghumari (1920–1997) – Morocco
- Abd al-Hamid Kishk (1933–1996) – Egypt
- Abdul Baqi Miftah (born 1952) – Algeria
- Ahmad al-Alawi (1869–1934) – Algeria
- Ahmed el-Tayeb (born 1946) – Egypt
- Ali Gomaa (born 1951) – Egypt
- Lalla Zaynab (1850–1904) – Algeria
- Hamza al Qadiri al Boutchichi (born 1922) – Morocco
- Hamza Yusuf (born 1960) – United States
- Muhammad ibn al-Habib (1876–1972) – Morocco
- Muhammad Sayyid Tantawy (1928–2010) – Egypt
- Shawki Allam (born 1961) – Egypt

== West, Central and Southern Africa ==
- Usman dan Fodio (1758--1817) -- Nigeria
- Abdalqadir as-Sufi (1930–2021) – South Africa
- Abdullahi dan Fodio (1768--1829) -- Nigeria
- Muhammed Bello (1781--1837) -- Nigeria
- Abdullah al-Harari (1910–2008) – Ethiopia
- Ahmad Tijani Ali Cisse (born 1955) – Senegal
- Ibrahim Niass (1900–1975) – Senegal
- Amadou Bamba (1853–1927) – Senegal
- Hassan Cissé (1945–2008) – Senegal
- Sa'adu Abubakar (born 1954) – Nigeria
- Sanusi Lamido Sanusi (born 1961) – Nigeria
- Osman Nuhu Sharubutu (born 1919) – Ghana
- Dahiru Usman Bauchi (born 1927) -- Nigeria
- Muhsin Hendricks (1967–2025) -- South Africa

== Western Europe ==
- Abdal Hakim Murad (born 1960) – United Kingdom
- Ahmed Saad Al-Azhari (born 1978) – United Kingdom
- Frithjof Schuon (1907–1998) – Switzerland
- Idries Shah (1924–1996) – United Kingdom
- Llewellyn Vaughan-Lee (born 1953) – United Kingdom
- Martin Lings (1909–2005) – United Kingdom
- Muhammad Imdad Hussain Pirzada (born 1946) – United Kingdom
- Annemarie Schimmel (1922–2003) – Germany
- Ivan Aguéli (1969–1917) – Sweden
- Umar Al-Qadri – Ireland

== Eastern Europe ==
- Said Afandi al-Chirkawi (1937–2012) – Russia (Dagestan)
- Ahmet Mahmut Ünlü (born 1965) – Turkey
- Hüseyin Hilmi Işık (1911–2001) – Turkey
- Mahmud Esad Coşan (1938–2001) – Turkey
- Mahmut Ustaosmanoğlu (1929–2022) – Turkey
- Mehmed Fatih Çıtlak (born 1967) – Turkey
- Muzaffer Ozak (1916–1985) – Turkey
- Nazim Al-Haqqani (1922–2014) – Turkey
- Osman Nuri Topbaş (born 1942) – Turkey
- Ömer Tuğrul İnançer (1946–2022) – Turkey
- Said Nursî (1878–1960) – Turkey
- Süleyman Ateş (born 1933) – Turkey

== North America ==
- Ali Kianfar (born 1944) – United States
- Ahmed Tijani Ben Omar (born 1950) – United States
- Faraz Rabbani (born 1974) – Canada
- Feisal Abdul Rauf (born 1948) – United States
- Hamza Yusuf (born 1960) – United States
- Hisham Kabbani (born 1945) – United States
- Hossein Nasr (born 1933) – United States
- M. A. Muqtedar Khan (born 1966) – United States
- Muhammad bin Yahya al-Ninowy (born 1966) – United States
- Nahid Angha (born 1945) – United States
- Nooruddeen Durkee (1938–2020) – United States
- Robert Darr (born 1951) – United States
- Syed Soharwardy (born 1955) – Canada
- Zaid Shakir (born 1956) – United States

== South Asia ==
- Khwaja Shamsuddin Azeemi - Karachi, Pakistan (1927-2025)
- Sheikh Abubakr Ahmad - Kerala, India (1939 - )
- Sayyid Ibrahim Khaleel Al Bukhari - Kerala, India (1960 - ))
- Dr.Muhammed Abdul Hakkim Azhari - Kerala, India (1971- ))
- Mohammad Abu Bakr Siddique – West Bengal
- Wasif Ali Wasif (1929–1993) – Pakistan
- Abdul Rashid Dawoodi (1979) – India
- Akhundzada Saif-ur-Rahman Mubarak (1925–2010) - Pakistan
- Bawa Muhaiyaddeen (?–1986) – Sri Lanka
- Ahmed Ullah Maizbhanderi (1826–1906) – Bangladesh
- Azangachhi Shaheb (1828/1829–1932) – India
- Imdadullah Muhajir Makki (1817–1899) – India
- Meher Ali Shah (1859–1937) – Pakistan
- Mohammad Abdul Ghafoor Hazarvi (1909–1970) – Pakistan
- Muhammad Akram Awan (1934–2017) – Pakistan
- Pir Muhammad Alauddin Siddiqui (1936–2017) – Pakistan
- Muhammad Tahir-ul-Qadri (born 1951) – Pakistan
- Qalandar Baba Auliya (1898–1979) – Pakistan
- Qamaruzzaman Azmi (born 1946) – India
- Saheb Qiblah Fultali (1913–2008) – Bangladesh
- Shah Shahidullah Faridi (1915–1978) – Pakistan
- Syed Muhammad Zauqi Shah (1878–1951) – Pakistan
- Syed Waheed Ashraf (born 1933) – India
- Tajuddin Muhammad Badruddin (1861–1925) – India
- Ahmad Raza Khan Barelvi (1856–1921)
- Shah Mir Badshah III (1870–1935) – India
- Thaika Shuaib (1930–2021) – India
- Wahid Baksh Sial Rabbani (died 1995) – Pakistan
- Waris Ali Shah (1819–1905) – India
- Kareemullah Shah (died 1913) – India
- Machiliwale Shah (died 1932) – India
- Naseeruddin Naseer Gilani

(1949-2009) – Pakistan

- Sayyad Muhammad Ashraf Kichhouchhwi – India
- Sayyad Muhammad Izhar Ashraf – India
- Hujjat-ul-Islam Hamid Raza Khan (1875–1943) – India
- Masihullah Khan
- Mustafa Raza Khan (1892–1981) – India
- Syed Mohammed Mukhtar Ashraf- India

== Eastern and Central Asia ==
- Habib Ali Kwitang (1870–1968) – Indonesia
- Habib Munzir Al-Musawa (1973–2013) – Indonesia
- Habib Usman bin Yahya (1822–1913) – Indonesia
- Muhammad Abdul Aleem Siddiqi (1892–1954) – Singapore
- Muhammad Ma Jian (1906–1978) – China
- Salih bin Muhsin Al-Hamid (1895–1976) – Indonesia
- Syed Muhammad Naquib al-Attas (born 1931) – Malaysia
- Ustad wan hizam (born 1971) – Malaysia
- Sheikh Muhammad Sodiq Muhammad Yusuf (1952-2015) - Uzbekistan

== Oceania ==
- Halim Rane – Australia

== Philippines ==
- Shaykh Ahmad Imbing – One of the leading Sunni, Ash'ari in Aqeeda and Shafi'i in Fiqh scholar.
- Shaykh Khadzraji Tapsi – Ameer of Sabielal Muhtadin Foundation Inc. One of the leading Senior Sunni, Ash'ari in Aqeeda and Shafi'i in Fiqh scholar.
- Sayyiduna Professor Yusuf Morales – former Commissioner of National Commission on Muslim Filipinos. Lead Convenor of Consortium for Peacebuilders, Governance Development and Security Studies. Former Muslim Affairs Coordinator of Ateneo de Zamboanga University, Zamboanga (ADZU). Sunni Sufi Scholar with Ijazah in the different Turuq and the science of Irfan.
- Shaykh Aliazer Abdurajim – Cultural writer, poet, and peace advocate.Chairman of the Board at Zambasulta Halal Hub Inc.
- Shaykh Al Johan Caluang Ilacad – Muslim formator of Ateneo de Zamboanga University, Zamboanga (ADZU). Muqaddam of the Shadhili Rifa'i Qadiri Tariqa. Student of the Muhaddith Muhammad al-Yaqoubi and Muhaddith Muhammad bin Yahya al-Ninowy. He is also an Ustad with permission or Ijazah in the 40 Tariqa
- Shaykh Khalid Ismael – Ameer of the Naqshbandi Tariqa in the Philippines. Student of the Muhaddith Mehmet Adil.
- Atty. Datu Amir Wagas – an Ustad with permission or Ijazah in the 40 Tariqa. He is also a Student of the Muhaddith Mehmet Adil.
- Faqir Calingalan Hussin Caluang - Sunni, Ash'ari in Aqeeda and Shafi'i in Fiqh
- Shaykh Al Jamar Ismael – Student of the Muhaddith Mehmet Adil.
- Shaykh Ali Parmanan Hajul – Student of the Muhaddith Mehmet Adil.
- Shaykh Shamir Kingking – Student of the Muhaddith Muhammad al-Yaqoubi and Muhaddith Muhammad bin Yahya al-Ninowy.
- Shaykh Alnaif Kingking – Student of the Muhaddith Muhammad al-Yaqoubi and Muhaddith Muhammad bin Yahya al-Ninowy.
- Imam Al Hassan Tawasil Caluang- son of Imam Hadji Yahya Caluang son of Capt.Kalingalan Caluang son of Panglima Caluang son of Panglima Bandahala son of Sattiya Munuh son of Sayyid Sharif Qasim;with permission or Ijazah in the 40 Tariqa.
- Shaykh Abdul Warith Abdula – Student of the Muhaddith Muhammad al-Yaqoubi and Muhaddith Muhammad bin Yahya al-Ninowy. He is also an Ustad with permission or Ijazah in the 40 Tariqa
