= Sufism in the Philippines =

Sufism has a history in the Philippines evolving for over 1,000 years. Sufism, also known as the science of Tasawwuf, encompasses numerous interpretations by its practitioners and critics. The term is derived from the Arabic words "Safa" (purity) and "Suwf" (wool), symbolizing the woolen garments traditionally worn by Sufis. Essentially, Tasawwuf is the science of Ihsan, focusing on the purification of the self for the love of Allah. This involves following specific Tariqas (spiritual paths), practices, and litanies. Tariqas in Sufism can be compared to spiritual orders in Catholicism, such as the Jesuits, Franciscans, and Dominicans. Numerous Tariqas exist in the Philippines today, with followers spread across the country, although they have faced opposition from Wahhabis despite the Sufis' peace-loving nature. The presence of Sufism has been a leading entity increasing the reaches of Islam throughout South Asia.

Historically, many Tariqas have existed, but currently, there are 41 major Tariqas. Four of these are widely recognized by scholars: Naqshbandi, Qadiri, Shadhili, and Chishti. Following the entrance of Islam in the early 8th century, Sufi mystic traditions became more visible during the 13th century before the Sultanate of Sulu and after it to the rest of Philippines, particularly, Sulu, Basilan, Tawi-Tawi and Zamboanga.

The Ba 'Alawi sada and Persian influence saturated Southeast Asia with Islam, Sufi thinking, syncretic values, literature, and education swept throughout Nusantara and has left an indelible mark on the presence of Islam in the Philippines. Sufi preachers, merchants and missionaries also settled in Sulu and Tawi-Tawi through maritime voyages and trade.

== History ==
=== Early history ===
Historically, Islam reached the Philippine archipelago in the 14th century, through contact with Muslim Malay and Arab merchants along Southeast Asian trade networks, in addition to Yemeni missionaries from the tribe of Alawi of Yemen from the Persian Gulf, southern India, and their followers from several sultanates in the wider Malay Archipelago. The first missionaries then followed in the late 14th and early 15th centuries. They facilitated the formation of sultanates and conquests in mainland Mindanao and Sulu.

Sufism arrived in the Philippines with the Sharif Sab’ah or Lumpang Basih, Sufi missionaries who introduced Islam to the region. Over time, elements of Tasawwuf merged with local spiritual beliefs, leading to the development of Indigenous Islam or Ilmuh kamaasan. Professor Yusuf Morales describes this as "an indigenized amalgamation of Islam from preceding schools of thought and local cultural customs." This integration became a cultural treasure, especially among the Tausugs of Sulu, passed down through generations.

==== Sufi practices in the Philippines ====
In the Philippines, common Sufi practices include Mawlid (celebration of the Prophet's birth), gatherings for Isra wal Mi’raj (the Night Journey and Ascension), reciting Surah Yasin on Nisfu Sha’ban (the middle night of Sha’ban), visiting the graves of pious individuals, and performing Tahlil Arwah (prayers for the deceased). Despite increasing opposition from Wahhabis, who deem these practices un-Islamic, these traditions have been preserved.

These practices of the makhdumin, the first missionaries of Islam in the Philippines are the treasures of the Bangsamoro. There are already many practitioners of Sufism in the country from different social status. The orders or tariqas that are present in the country are: the Naqshbandi Aliya, Naqshbandi Chisti, Qadiri, Rifai, Shattari, Rifai Qadiri Shadhili, Tijani, and Khalwati. The Naqshbandi Aliya tariqa have the most followers, concentrated in Manila, Cebu, Zamboanga, Sulu, and Tawi-Tawi. There are also Sufis from the students and alumni of known universities, such as the Ateneo de Manila University, the Ateneo de Zamboanga University, and Western Mindanao State University.

=== Misconceptions and opposition ===
Despite Sufism's wide acceptance among Sunnis, Wahhabism's rise has fueled opposition. Wahhabis often label Sufis as Kafir (disbelievers), Mushrik (polytheists), or practitioners of Bid'ah. Historically, Wahhabis have committed atrocities against Sufis, including desecrating graves, abusing Sufis, and murdering Sufi masters. The ISIS has also targeted Sufi scholars. Wahhabis and Salafis, lacking proper knowledge of Tasawwuf, are often driven by zealotry and bigotry.

Wahhabism has been implicated in extremism and terrorism worldwide. Examples of these groups are the Mahad Moro, Mahad Salamat, and Mahad Quran wal Hadith Zamboanga City, the Mercy Foundation in Manila and Davao City, the Al-Maarif Educational Center in Baguio City, and the Jamiatul Waqf al-Islamie, and Jamiato Monib al-Kouzbary al-Arabiyah in Marawi City.

== List of Sufis in the Philippines ==
- Sultan Sharif ul-Hāshim of Sulu
- Sheikh Karimul Makhdum
- Sayyid Balfaqi Alawi
- Sayyid Barwa
- Sayyid Kimar
- Tuan Mashaykha
- Tuan Maqbalu
- Sayyid Qasim-father of Sayyid Sattiya Muno
- Sayyid Sattiya Muno-Awliya of Tandah in Sulu
- Tuan Awliya Musa
- Tuan Awliya Mat Salleh- known as Paduka Muhammad Salih, a relative of Sayyid Sattiya Muno
- Tuan Haman
- Tuan Guru Hadji Ghulam Hassan AlBikangi
- Tuan Anjawtal
- Tuan Anjawtal
- Shaykh Ahmad Imbing – One of the leading Sunni, Ash'ari in Aqeeda and Shafi'i in Fiqh scholar.
- Mufti Mohammad Haikar Amilhamja
- Shaykh Khadzraji Tapsi – Ameer of Sabielal Muhtadin Foundation Inc. One of the leading Senior Sunni, Ash'ari in Aqeeda and Shafi'i in Fiqh scholar.
- Sayyiduna Shaykh Saukhani Hussein Kimpa
- Sayyiduna Shaykh Jamjam Salih-Naqshbandi Khalidiyya Tariqa
- Professor Yusuf Morales – former Commissioner of National Commission on Muslim Filipinos. Lead Convenor of Consortium for Peacebuilders, Governance Development and Security Studies. Former Muslim Affairs Coordinator of Ateneo de Zamboanga University, Zamboanga (ADZU).
- Shaykh Aliazer Abdurajim – A cultural writer, poet, and peace advocate.Chairman of the Board at Zambasulta Halal Hub Inc.
- Shaykh Al Johan Caluang Ilacad – Sunni Muslim formator of Ateneo de Zamboanga University, Zamboanga (ADZU). Muqaddam of the Shadhili Rifa'i Qadiri Tariqa. Student of the Muhaddith Muhammad al-Yaqoubi and Muhaddith Muhammad bin Yahya al-Ninowy. He is also an Ustad with permission or Ijazah in the 40 Tariqa
- Shaykh Khalid Ismael – Ameer of the Naqshbandi Tariqa in the Philippines. Student of the Muhaddith Mehmet Adil.
- Atty. Datu Amir Wagas – He is a Student of the Muhaddith Mehmet Adil and studying the Naqshbandi,Ba Alawi and Shadhili turuq.
- Faqir Calingalan Hussin Caluang – Sunni Muslim of the Ashʿarī creed and Shāfiʿī school of jurisprudence; Naqīb al-Ashrāf of the Philippines.
- Shaykh Al Jamar Ismael – Student of the Muhaddith Mehmet Adil.
- Sidi Jason Muhammad Cristobal
- Shaykh Ali Parmanan Hajul – Student of the Muhaddith Mehmet Adil.
- Shaykh Shamir Kingking – Student of the Muhaddith Muhammad al-Yaqoubi and Muhaddith Muhammad bin Yahya al-Ninowy.
- Shaykh Alnaif Kingking – Student of the Muhaddith Muhammad al-Yaqoubi and Muhaddith Muhammad bin Yahya al-Ninowy.
- Imam Al Hassan Caluang- son of Imam Hadji Yahya Caluang son of Capt.Kalingalan Caluang son of Panglima Caluang son of Panglima Bandahala son of Sattiya Munuh son of Sayyid Sharif Qasim;with permission or Ijazah in the 40 Tariqa.
- Shaykh Abdul Warith Abdula – Student of the Muhaddith Muhammad al-Yaqoubi and Muhaddith Muhammad bin Yahya al-Ninowy. He is also an Ustad with permission or Ijazah in the 40 Tariqa

== See also ==
- Ba 'Alawi sada
- Islam in the Philippines

== Bibliography ==
- Islam, Sirajul (2004). Sufism and Bhakti. USA. ISBN 1-56518-198-0.
- Schimmel, Annemarie (1978). Mystical dimensions of Islam. USA: University of North Carolina Press. ISBN 0-8078-1271-4.
- Alvi, Sajida Sultana (2012). Perspectives on Mughal India: Rulers, Historians, Ulama, and Sufis. Karachi: Oxford University Press.
- Aquil, Raziuddin (2007). Sufism, Culture, and Politics: Afghans and Islam in Medieval North India. New Delhi: Oxford University Press.
- Morgan, Michael Hamilton (2007). Lost History: The Enduring Legacy of Muslim Scientists, Thinkers, Artists. Washington D.C.: National Geographic. ISBN 9781426202803.
- Walsh, Judith E. (2006). A Brief History of India. Old Westbury: State University of New York.
- Schimmel, Anniemarie (1975). "Sufism in Indo-Pakistan". Mystical Dimensions of Islam. Chapel Hill: University of North Carolina Press.
- Schimmel, Anniemarie (1975). "Sufi Orders and Fraternities". Mystical Dimensions of Islam. Chapel Hill: University of North Carolina Press.
- Saiyid Zaheer Husain Jafri and Helmut Reifeld, ed. (2006). The Islamic Path: Sufism, Politics, and Society in India. New Delhi: Konrad Adenauer Foundation.
- Zargar, Cyrus Ali (2013). "RELG 379: Islamic Mysticism". Augustana College.
- Sells, Michael A. (1996). Early Islamic Mysticism: Sufi, Qur'an, Mi'raj, Poetic and Theological Writings. New Jersey: Paulist Press.
- Abidi, S.A.H. (1992). Sufism in India. New Delhi: Wishwa Prakashan.
- Abbas, Shemeem Burney (2002). The Female Voice in Sufi Ritual: Devotional Practices in Pakistan and India. Austin: University of Texas Press.
- Anjum, Tanvir (2011). Chishti Sufis in the Sultanate of Delhi 1190-1400: From Restrained Indifference to Calculated Defiance. Pakistan: Oxford University Press.
- Chopra, R. M., "The Rise, Growth And Decline of Indo-Persian Literature", 2012, Iran Culture House, New Delhi and Iran Society, Kolkata. 2nd Ed.2013.
- Chopra, R. M., "Great Sufi Poets of the Punjab"' (1999), Iran Society, Calcutta.
- Chopra, R.M., "SUFISM" (Origin, Growth, Eclipse, Resurgence), 2016, Anuradha Prakashan, New Delhi, ISBN 978-93-85083-52-5
