= Ahmed Omer =

Ahmed Omer (Arabic: أحمد عمر) may refer to:

- Ahmad ibn Umar al-Hazimi, Saudi Arabian Salafi scholar
- Ahmad Omar Moghrabi (born 1983), Lebanese football coach and former player
- Ahmad Omar (politician), Malaysian politician
- Ahmad Umar Abu Ubaidah (born 1972), Al-Shabaab leader
- Ahmed Omar (cyclist) (born 1933), Moroccan cyclist
- Ahmed Omar (footballer), Qatari-Lebanese footballer and coach
- Ahmed Omar Abu Ali (born 1981), American who was allegedly worked with al-Qaeda
- Ahmed Omar Bani, Libyan airforce colonel
- Ahmed Omar Maiteeg (born 1972), Libyan businessman and politician
- Ahmed Omar Saeed Sheikh (born 1973), British Islamist
- Ahmed Salah Yusuuf Omer, one of the two Sudanese hacktivists operating Anonymous Sudan, along with Alaa Omer
- Ahmed Tijani Ben Omar (born 1950), Ghanaian Islamic scholar and Imam
- Ahmed Umar (artist) (born 1988), Sudanese-Norwegian artist and LGBT activist
- Prince Ahmed Umer Ahmedzai, Pakistani politician
