= Yasin al-Fadani =

20th-century Saudi Hadith scholar of Indonesian descent

Muhammad Yasin al-Fadani محمد ياسين الفاداني
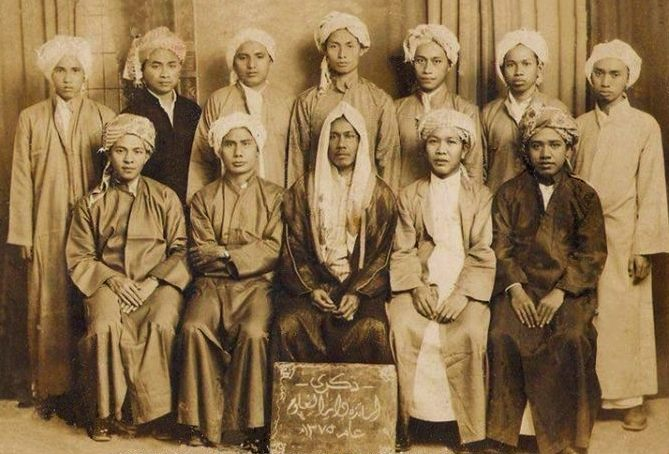
- al-Fadani (middle, sat on chair) with teachers of Dar al-Ulum al-Diniyyah

Personal life
- Born: 1916 Mecca, Kingdom of Hejaz
- Died: 21 July 1990 (aged 73–74) Mecca, Saudi Arabia
- Resting place: Jannat al-Mu'alla
- Main interest(s): Hadith, Islamic jurisprudence

Religious life
- Religion: Islam
- Denomination: Sunni
- Jurisprudence: Shafi'i
- Creed: Ash'ari

Abū al-Fayḍ Muḥammad Yāsīn bin Muḥammad ʿĪsā al-Fādānī al-Makkī (Arabic: أبو الفيض محمد ياسين بن محمد عيسى الفاداني المكي; 1916 – 21 July 1990) was a Saudi ʿālim of Minangkabau descent. He was known as a muḥaddith who collected the most hadith chains of transmission (isnād) of his time, thus earning him the title Musnid al-Dunyā.

== Biography ==
Yasin al-Fadani was born in Mecca in 1335 AH (1916 CE). His father, Muhammad Isa, hailed from Padang in modern-day Indonesia. Yasin al-Fadani spent most of his life in Mecca.

He began his studies with his father, Muhammad Isa al-Fadani, and his uncle, Mahmud al-Fadani. He then studied at Madrasah al-Sawlatiyyah, a madrasa which was founded by clerics from the Indian subcontinent. When a conflict arose between Indian and Southeast Asian teachers, the latter left Sawlatiyyah to establish a new madrasa, Dar al-Ulum al-Diniyyah. al-Fadani moved to the new madrasa in 1353 AH. After he graduated in 1356 AH, he was appointed as a teacher at Dar al-Ulum al-Diniyyah. In 1375 AH, he was chosen as the director of the madrasa.

Apart from his activities at Dar al-Ulum, al-Fadani taught several subjects at Masjid al-Haram. He also spent part of his time studying under several scholars at Masjid al-Haram. In 1377 AH, he built a madrasa for girls.

al-Fadani died on 28 Dhu al-Hijjah 1410 (21 July 1990). He was buried in Jannat al-Mu'alla.

== Teachers and students ==
al-Fadani studied under around 400 teachers in the Hejaz. Some of his well-known teachers include Muhammad Ali bin Husayn bin Ibrahim al-Maliki, Hasan bin Muhammad al-Mashat, Umar bin Hamdan al-Mahrasi, Muhammad bin Ahmad bin Aqilah, Ali bin Zahir al-Watri, Abid al-Sindi, Falih bin Muhammad al-Zahiri, Sayyid Husayn bin Muhammad al-Habashi, Umar Bajunayd al-Shafii, Said bin Muhammad al-Yamani, Hasan bin Said al-Yamani, Sayyid Muhsin bin Ali al-Musawi al-Falimbani, Abd Allah Muhammad al-Ghazi, Ibrahim bin Dawud al-Fatani, Alawi bin Abbas al-Maliki, Sayyid Muhammad bin Amin al-Kutbi, Shihab Ahmad al-Mukhallalati al-Shami, Khalifah bin Hamd Al Nabhan, Ubayd Allah bin al-Islam al-Sindi, Husayn Ahmad al-Faydabadi, Abd al-Qadir bin Tawfiq al-Shalabi, Muhammad Abd al-Baqi al-Luknawi, and Abd al-Hadi al-Madrasi.

Some famous Islamic scholars studied under him, such as Muhammad Taqi Uthmani, Ali Jumaah, Hasan Azhari, and Muhammad bin Yahya al-Ninawi.

== Literary works ==
al-Fadani authored a number of works, some of them unpublished, others in print. From amongst his works are:

Hadith

- al-Durr al-Manḍūd: Sharḥ Sunan Abī Dāwud (20 volumes)
- Fatḥ al-‘Allām: Sharḥ Bulūgh al-Marām (4 volumes)

Fiqh and Usul al-fiqh

- Bughyah al-Mushtāq: Sharḥ Luma‘ al-Shaykh Abī Isḥāq
- Ḥāshiyah ‘alā al-Ashbāh wa al-Naẓā’ir fī al-Furū‘ al-Fiqhiyyah li al-Suyūṭī
- Tatmīm al-Dukhūl: Ta‘līqāt ‘alā Madkhal al-Wuṣūl ilā ‘Ilm al-Uṣūl
- al-Durr al-Naḍīd: Hawāshi ‘alā Kitāb al-Tamhīd li al-Isnawī
- al-Fawā’id al-Juniyyah: Ḥāshiyah ‘alā al-Mawāhib al-Sunniyyah ‘alā al-Qawā’id al-Fiqhiyyah
- Ta‘līqāt ‘alā Luma‘ al-Shaykh Abī Isḥāq
- Iḍā’ah al-Nūr al-Lāmi‘: Sharḥ al-Kawkab al-Sāṭi‘ Naẓm Jam‘ al-Jawāmi‘
- Ḥāshiyah ‘alā al-Talaṭuf Sharḥ al-Ta‘arruf fī Uṣūl al-Fiqh
- Nayl al-Ma’mūl: Ḥāshiyah ‘alā Lubb al-Uṣūl wa Ghāyah al-Wuṣūl

Astronomy

- Jannī al-Thamr: Sharḥ Manẓūmah Manāzil al-Qamar
- al-Mukhtaṣar al-Muhadhdhab fī Istikhrāj al-Awqāt wa al-Qiblah bi al-Rubi‘ al-Mujīb
- al-Mawāhib al-Jazīlah: Sharḥ Thamarāt al-Wasīlah

Arabic grammar

- Tashnī al-Sam‘: Mukhtaṣar fī ‘Ilm al-Waḍa‘
- Bulghah al-Mushtāq fī ‘Ilm al-Ishtiqāq

Logic, rhetoric, and others

- Manhal al-Ifādah: Hawāshi ‘alā Risālah Ādāb al-Bahth wa al-Munāẓarah li Ṭāshkubrīzādah
- Ḥusn al-Ṣiyāghah: Sharḥ Kitāb Durūs al-Balāghah
- Risālah fī ‘Ilm al-Manṭiq
- Itḥāf al-Khallān: Tawḍīḥ Tuḥfah al-Ikhwān fī ‘Ilm al-Bayān li al-Dardīr
- al-Risālah al-Bayāniyyah fī ‘Ilm al-Bayān ‘alā Ṭarīqah al-Su’āl wa al-Jawāb

Hadith chains of narration

- Maṭmaḥ al-Wajdān (transmission from Umar Hamdan, 3 volumes)
- Fayḍ al-Raḥman (transmission from Khalifah bin Hamd Al Nabhan)
- Fayḍ al-Muhaymīn (transmission from Sayyid Muhsin al-Musawi)
- al-Maslak al-Jallī (transmission from Muhammad Ali al-Maliki)
- al-Waṣl al-Rātī (transmission from Shihab Ahmad al-Mukhallalati)

== See also ==
- List of Ash'aris
