= Muhammad al-'Arabi al-Tabbani =

Algerian Sunni Muslim scholar

- محمد العربي التبّاني

Personal life
- Born: 1315 A.H. = 1897/1898 A.D. Ras el-Oued
- Died: 22 Safar, 1390 A.H. = 28 April 1970 A.D. Mecca
- Resting place: Jannat al-Mu'alla
- Home town: Sétif
- Main interest(s): 'Aqidah, Hadith studies, Fiqh
- Notable work: Bara'at al-Ash'ariyyin min 'Aqa'id al-Mukhalifin (English: The Innocence/Dissociation of the Ash'aris from the Opposing Beliefs)

Religious life
- Religion: Islam
- Denomination: Sunni
- Lineage: His lineage reaches back to 'Abd al-Salam ibn Mashish
- Jurisprudence: Maliki
- Creed: Ash'ari

Muslim leader
- Teacher: Hamdan al-Wanisi
- Students: Muhammad 'Alawi al-Maliki 'Abdullah al-Harari
- Influenced: 'Ali Gum'a

Muhammad al-'Arabi al-Tabbani (Arabic: محمد العربي التبّاني; 1897–1970), also known as Abu Hamid ibn Marzuq (Arabic: أبو حامد بن مرزوق) was an Algerian Maliki jurist (faqih), Ash'ari theologian, Hadith scholar (muhaddith), historian (mu'arrikh), and a genealogist (nassāba), who was the Imam of the Great Mosque in Mecca in his time.

He is considered one of the most prominent hadith scholars of his era; and he is perhaps best known for his criticism of Wahhabism/Salafism, as found in his book entitled, Bara'at al-Ash'ariyyin min 'Aqa'id al-Mukhalifin (English: The Innocence/Dissociation of the Ash'aris from the Doctrines of the Dissenters/Opponents).

His name 'al-Tabbani' is derived from the town and commune of Ouled Tebben.

== Birth ==
He was born in Ras el-Oued in 1315 AH/1897 AD.

== Lineage ==
His lineage reaches back to 'Abd al-Salam b. Mashish (d. 625/1228), whose lineage ends with al-Hasan b. 'Ali b. Abi Talib (d. 49/669).

== Teachers ==
He studied under many scholars, among them are:

- 'Abd al-Hamid ibn Badis.
- Yusuf al-Nabhani.
- Muhammad Bakhit al-Muti'i.
- Muhammad ibn Ja'far al-Kattani.
- Muhammad al-Makki ibn 'Azuz.
- Hamdan ibn Ahmad al-Wanisi.
- Ahmad ibn al-Khayyat al-Zakari.
- Mushtaq Ahmad al-Hindi.

== Students ==
Among his celebrated students are:

- 'Alawi ibn 'Abbas al-Maliki and his son Muhammad 'Alawi al-Maliki.
- 'Abdullah al-Harari.
- Muhammad Nur Saif.
- Hasan al-Mashshat.
- 'Abdullah b. Sa'id al-Lahji.
- Muhammad Amin Kutbi.
- 'Abd al-Qadir b. Ahmad al-Jaza'iri.

== Works ==
Among his books are the following:

- Bara'at al-Ash'ariyyin min 'Aqa'id al-Mukhalifin (Arabic: براءة الأشعريين من عقائد المخالفين, lit. 'The Innocence/Dissociation of the Ash'aris from the Doctrines of the Dissenters/Opponents'). In this book, he criticized the doctrinal views advocated by Ibn Taymiyya (d. 728/1328) and his student Ibn al-Qayyim (d. 751/1350), and Muhammad ibn 'Abd al-Wahhab (d. 1207/1792) and his followers.
- Al-Ta'aqqub al-Mufid 'ala Hadyy al-Zar'i al-Shadid (Arabic: التعقب المفيد على هدي الزرعي الشديد). In this book, he criticized Ibn al-Qayyim's book Zad al-Ma'ad.
- Tahzir al-'Abqari min Muhadarat al-Khudari (Arabic: تحذير العبقري من محاضرات الخضري). In this book, he criticized the Egyptian legal historian Muhammad al-Khudari (d. 1345/1927).

== Death ==
He died in 1390 AH/1970 AD in Mecca and was buried in Jannat al-Mu'alla cemetery, next to the tomb of Asma' bint Abi Bakr (d. 73/692).

== See also ==
- Sulayman ibn Abd al-Wahhab
- Ahmad Zayni Dahlan
- Muhammad Zahid al-Kawthari
- Abdullah al-Ghumari
- Khalil Ahmad Saharanpuri
- Muhammad 'Abid al-Sindi
- Muhammad Said Ramadan al-Bouti
- 'Ali Gum'a
- Ahmad Karima
- Sa'id Foudah
