= Baksh =

Baksh may refer to:

== People ==
- Ali Baksh (1850–1920), Hindustani classical musician and teacher
- Charles Baksh (born 1938), cricketer
- Dave Baksh (born 1980), Canadian guitarist and singer
- Murad Baksh (1624–1661), youngest son of Mughal emperor Shah Jahan and empress Mumtaz Mahal
- Muhammad Kam Bakhsh, Mughal prince, son of emperor Aurangzeb
- Wahid Baksh Bhutto (1898–1931), landowner of Sindh
- Imam Baksh Pahalwan (1883–1977), Indian wrestler and practitioner of the Indian wrestling style of Pehlwani
- Captain Wahid Baksh Sial Rabbani (1910–1995), saint in the Chishti (Sabri branch) order of Sufis
- Sammy Baksh, Guyanese singer-songwriter
- Prince Baksh, fictional character in the 1976 Indian film Laila Majnu, portrayed by Danny Denzongpa
- Al-Baksh, fictional character portrayed by Arbaaz Khan in the 2002 Indian film Maa Tujhe Salaam

== Other uses ==
- Khuda Baksh Oriental Library, in Patna, Bihar, India

== See also ==
- Bakhsh, administrative division in Iran
- Baksheesh, an endowment
- Bakshi, an Indian surname
