= Ahmed Tijani =

Ahmed Tijani (Arabic: أحمد تيجاني بن عمر) is a male Muslim given name formed from the elements Ahmed and Tijani. It may refer to:

- Ahmad al-Tijani (1735–1815), Algerian founder of the Tijaniyya Sufi order
- Ahmed Tijani Ahmed (1941–2006), Nigerian politician
- Ahmed Tijani Ben Omar (born 1950), Ghanaian Islamic scholar and Imam
- Ahmad Tijani Ali Cisse (born 1955), Senegalese leader of the Tijaniyya Sufi order
- Ahmad Tijani (born 1987), Nigerian footballer
- Ahmad al-Tijani (born 1943), Tunisian Islamic scholar and Imam
