= 1999 Nigerian Senate elections in Kogi State =

The 1999 Nigerian Senate election in Kogi State was held on February 20, 1999, to elect members of the Nigerian Senate to represent Kogi State. Tunde Ogbeha representing Kogi West, Ahmed Tijani representing Kogi Central and Alex Kadir representing Kogi East all won on the platform of the Peoples Democratic Party.

== Overview ==
Affiliation	Party		Total
Affiliation	PDP	AD	Total
Before Election			3
After Election	3	0	3

== Summary ==
District	Incumbent	Party	Elected Senator	Party
Kogi West			Tunde Ogbeha	PDP
Kogi Central			Ahmed Tijani	PDP
Kogi East			Alex Kadir	PDP

== Results ==
=== Kogi West ===
The election was won by Tunde Ogbeha of the Peoples Democratic Party.

1999 Nigerian Senate election in Kogi State
Party	Candidate	Votes	%
PDP	Tunde Ogbeha		
Total votes			
PDP hold			

=== Kogi Central ===
The election was won by Ahmed Tijani of the Peoples Democratic Party.

1999 Nigerian Senate election in Kogi State
Party	Candidate	Votes	%
PDP	Ahmed Tijani		
Total votes			
PDP hold			

=== Kogi East ===
The election was won by Alex Kadir of the Peoples Democratic Party.

1999 Nigerian Senate election in Kogi State
Party	Candidate	Votes	%
PDP	Alex Kadir		
Total votes			
PDP hold			
