= Salih bin Muhsin Al-Hamid =

Arab-Indonesian Sufi saint and scholar (1895–1976)

Habib Tanggul Qutb Sayyid Ṣāliḥ bin Muḥsin al-Ḥāmid
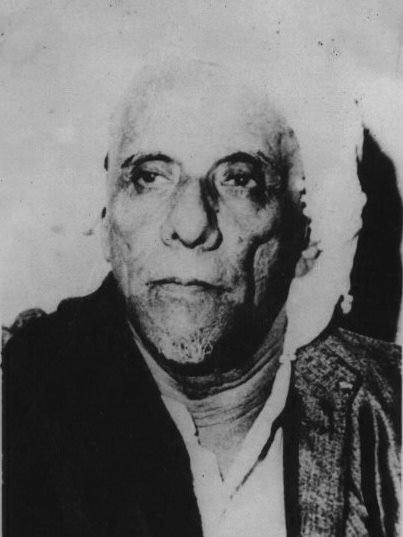
- Habib Salih in the 1950's

Personal life
- Born: November 4, 1895 Korbah Ba Karman, Wadi 'Amd, Hadhramaut
- Died: October 3, 1976 (aged 80) Tanggul, Jember, Indonesia
- Cause of death: Illness
- Resting place: Masjid Riyad al-Salihin Complex, Tanggul
- Spouse: Sharifa Fatima bint Mustafa al-Habshi
- Children: Sayyid Abdullah al-Hamid; Sayyid Muhammad al-Hamid; Sayyid Ali al-Hamid; Sharifa Nur al-Hamid; Sharifa Fatima al-Hamid; Sharifa Khadija al-Hamid
- Parents: Sayyid Muhsin bin Ahmad al-Hamid bin Sheikh Abu Bakr (father); Sheikha Aisha Ba 'Abud Ba 'Umar al-Amoudi (mother)
- Citizenship: Indonesian
- Era: Twentieth Century
- Region: Malay Archipelago

Religious life
- Religion: Islam
- Denomination: Sunni
- Jurisprudence: Shafi'i
- Tariqa: Ba 'Alawiyya
- Creed: Ash'ari

Sayyid Ṣāliḥ bin Muḥsin al-Ḥāmid (1895–1976, Arabic: السيد صلح بن محسن الحامد) also known as Habib Salih Tanggul in the Malay Archipelago was a Hadhrami Sufi scholar and a Wali who was considered as one of the most eminent Ba 'Alawi masters of the twentieth century along with the likes of Ahmad Mashhur al-Haddad, Abdul Qadir al-Saqqaf and others.

Born into a familial heritage of scholarly repute and elevated social status due to his lineage to Husayn ibn Ali on his paternal side and Abu Bakr on his maternal side, he was exposed to an environment of religious devotion which led him to aspire to sainthood and scholarly pursuits in a rural area of Hadhramaut. Under the tutelage of his father and others in the Wadi 'Amd, he had completed initial training in religious legal and spiritual affairs and like many other Hadhramis, young and old, went out of the poverty-stricken Hadhramaut province of Yemen and embarked on a maritime journey with companions to proselytize Islam and engage in commerce.

Eventually settling in Tanggul, in Indonesia, he went into seclusion to worship God alone, and remerged being declared a Qutb by cleric Habib Abu Bakr bin Muhammad al-Saqqaf in recognition of his Maqam with God, he then presented with several Karamat such as the foretelling of political events in Indonesia such as the coming of Adam Malik as foreign minister. Engaged in charitable works, he founded Masjid Riyad al-Salihin after receiving a parcel of land from a generous donor, where he would give lessons encouraging Islamic piety, and would gain a sizable following in the Malay Archipelago.

== Birth and family background ==
Sayyid Ṣāliḥ bin Muḥsin al-Ḥāmid was born on the 4th of November 1895 in the village of Korbah Ba Karman in the Wadi ‘Amd region of Hadhramaut to Sayyid Muḥsin bin Aḥmad al-Ḥāmid and Shaykhah ʿĀ’ishah Bā ʿAbūd. His father Muḥsin bin Aḥmad was a Habib, an Alid cleric of the Wadi ‘Amd who belonged to the al-Hamid branch of the descendants of Shaykh Abū Bakr bin Sālim, a major Sufi figure of the city of Tarim from the Ba ‘Alawi Sada, the primary Husayni tribe of Hadhramaut descended from Ali al-Uraydi, the younger brother of Musa al-Kazim. Salih bin Muhsin's full paternal lineage is as follows;

Ṣāliḥ ibn Muḥsin ibn Aḥmad ibn Abī Bakr ibn ʿAbd Allāh ibn Ṣāliḥ ibn ʿAbd Allāh ibn Sālim ibn ʿUmar ibn Ḥāmid ibn al-Shaykh al-Fakhr Abī Bakr ibn Sālim ibn ʿAbd Allāh ibn ʿAbd al-Raḥmān ibn ʿAbd Allāh ibn ʿAbd al-Raḥmān al-Saqqāf ibn Muḥammad Mawlā Dawīlah ibn ʿAlī ibn ʿAlawī al-Ghayūr ibn Muḥammad al-Faqīh al-Muqaddam ibn ʿAlī ibn Muḥammad Ṣāḥib Mirbāṭ ibn ʿAlī Khāliʿ Qasam ibn ʿAlawī ibn Muḥammad ibn ʿAlawī ibn ʿUbayd Allāh ibn Aḥmad al-Muhājir ibn ʿĪsā ibn Muḥammad al-Naqīb ibn ʿAlī al-ʿUrayḍī ibn Jaʿfar al-Ṣādiq ibn Muḥammad al-Bāqir ibn ʿAlī Zayn al-ʿĀbidīn ibn al-Ḥusayn al-Shahīd ibn ʿAlī ibn Abī Ṭālib wa-Fāṭimah al-Zahrā’ bint al-Nabī Muḥammad.

Salih bin Muhsin was a 36th generation descendant of the Prophet Muhammad on his paternal side.

His mother ʿĀ’ishah Bā ʿAbūd, a woman of great piety, was from the Ba ‘Abud branch of the family of Ba ‘Umar, descended from Sheikh Umar bin Ahmad al-Akhir al-Amoudi, a scholar and political leader who led a tribal resistance against Portuguese powers in Yemen and belonged to the Mashaikh al-Amoudi clan of Hadhramaut descended from Sheikh Sa'eed ibn Isa, a splinter branch of the larger al-Amoudi tribe based in the Hijaz descended from the first Sunni Caliph, Abu Bakr al-Siddiq. It was from this marriage that Salih al-Hamid's father Muhsin had acquired the nickname Habib al-Bakri.

== Early life and education ==
During his era, there was an absence of academic education in rural areas of the Hadhramaut of Yemen, thus most people especially those belonging to families of scholarly repute would have their children pursue intensive study of religious matters and law, gaining literacy and social standing. Like others, Salih had followed the same path, he was taught Fiqh, Islamic legal jurisprudence and Tasawwuf, perfection of Islamic spirituality, his main teacher for these was his own father, Habib Muhsin bin Ahmad al-Hamid. He had completed his memorisation and study of the Qur’an under the tutelage of Sheikh Sa’id Ba Mudhij, a prominent legal authority of the time in the Wadi ‘Amd. Salih being a Ba ‘Alawi Sayyid of Hadhramaut had like most around him followed the Shafi’i school in Fiqh and the Ba ‘Alawi Tariqah in Sufism.

== Migration and preaching ==
Salih bin Muhsin was twenty-six years old in 1921 when he decided to migrate out of Hadhramaut for purposes of Da’wah, Islamic missionary work, he was accompanied by an accomplice, Sheikh Fadl bin Salim al-Ashkari. They initially stopped at the port city of Surat in Gujarat, a western province of the Indian Subcontinent, historically a place of settlement for Hadhrami traders and missionaries. They then travelled to Jakarta in the Malay Archipelago where Habib Salih spent a considerable number of days visiting other settled scholarly Hadhrami figures. He then travelled to Lumajang upon invitation from his cousin Habib Muhsin bin Abdullah al-Hamid, who had long-settled there before Salih's migration.

During his time in Lumajang, Salih bin Muhsin decided to learn the language and culture of the Javanese people, he also married a resident of Tempeh, Lumajang, a Javanese woman of long-ago Ba ‘Alawi Hadhrami origin, Sharifa Fatima bint Mustafa al-Habshi, he then settled in Tempeh. Habib Salih would go preaching village from village in Lumajang for twelve years. He then moved his entire family and himself to Tanggul for unclear reasons, but his descendants believe it was for further missionary work. However, Habib Salih did not immediately resume preaching upon arrival, he decided to seclude himself from those around him, engaging in intensive worship for three years. It was not until when Habib Abu Bakr bin Muhammad al-Saqqaf, an eminent cleric, commanded his presence at Gresik with him, that he broke his state of seclusion.

Upon his arrival at Gresik, Salih bin Muhsin was given an Ijazah by Habib Abu Bakr, and presented with a robe and green turban denoting sainthood in the Ba ‘Alawi Tariqah, being declared a Qutb. He was also requested by Habib Abu Bakr to proceed to perform the Hajj, the Muslim pilgrimage. After returning from the Hajj in the Hijaz, Habib Salih had established a Musallah at his residence where he would deliver Dars, religious lessons which would often be after the Asr Salah, he would go through books, one book he would place emphasis upon was al-Nashaihud Dinniyah by Imam Abdullah bin Alawi al-Haddad, and he would do all this in the local language of the people after learning it, namingly Madurese. Habib Salih would also recite Dhikr and Wird of the scholars of his country of origin, Hadhramaut.

After many years of religious service to the people of Tanggul, Salih bin Muhsin received a large piece of land as a donation from a wealthy merchant by the name of Hajji Abdurrashid. On this land, Habib Salih built a mosque which he gave the name Masjid Riyad al-Salihin, this mosque is located just south of Tanggul Station. The construction of the mosque meant that his location of his Dars transferred there, and that he gained more influence as a scholar and spiritual master of the area.

Habib Salih was said to have been active in community affairs, helping the poor, those in debt, orphans and arranging marriages between unmarried men and women, it is said that he would resolve two or three cases of dispute every day. Habib Salih also had the honour of laying the first brick of Surabaya Islamic Hospital.

It is alleged that Habib Salih had briefly met the Prophet Khidr due to his Wilayah, who was allegedly disguised as a begger near Tanggul Station, Habib Salih was allegedly able to recognise him due to descriptions of the Prophet Khidr in classical works of scholars. The incident stated is that Habib Salih was walking to Tanggul Train Station when a begger suddenly came up to him asking for money, Habib Salih had ten rupiah in his pocket but did not give it as it was all that he had, the begger then left and came back again, after receiving the same response from Habib Salih, he left again and came back, but this time he said “What about the ten rupiah in your pocket”. At this moment, Habib Salih felt something strange, he then shook hands with the begger, the beggar's thumb felt soft as though it had no bone, a characteristic allegedly mentioned in classical works as being that of Prophet Khidr. He then told the beggar, “You must be Prophet Khidr, so please pray for me.” The man then supplicated and told him a guest is coming, then left. Soon a man dressed in all black emerged from the train station, and asked Habib Salih where Habib Salih's house is. Then Habib Salih replied that there is no Habib Salih but him, the man then said, “Then you are the one that I am looking for,” he then left, leaving Habib Salih stunned. After that particular incident his residence would often be full of visitors seeking his blessings.

== Political influence ==
Being a principal source of spiritual nourishment and guidance in Tanggul of his time, many people would draw to near to him to seek his blessings and counsel for their worldly affairs, amongst this crowd would often include political figures or state officials. One of these political figures that sought his help is Adam Malik, the former vice-president of Indonesia, during the rule of the Indonesian Communist Party, Malik would often receive death threats due to his work at the National News Agency (ANTARA), these death threats were supposed to have come from Soebandrio, the minister of foreign affairs at the time. Malik then went to Habib Ali Kwitang and sought a way of protection from these death threats from him, Habib Ali then recommended Malik to go visit Habib Salih at his residence at Tanggul. Habib Salih welcomed him and let him stay for one night after which he told Adam Malik to return to Jakarta and hide, seeking God's protection, and that he would one day take up Soebandrio's position of being foreign minister. This would come to be true after the September 30th Movement upon which in 1966, Adam Malik become the foreign minister of Indonesia.

A similar occurrence had happened with Alwi Shihab who was a student struggling with legal documents and visas, Shihab came to Habib Salih to ask for his blessings who then told him to bathe in two wells near his residence and then to meet Adam Malik, the foreign minister of the time. Shihab was initially sceptical about the idea as ordinary citizens like himself would struggle to meet with a high-ranking state official like Malik, but Habib Salih provided him with a letter and told him not be afraid of Malik, as he would take his position of Foreign Minister one day. Many years later this came to be true when Alwi Shihab become Foreign Minister in the era of Abdurrahman Wahid’s presidency.

== Death and legacy ==
Salih bin Muhsin died on the 3rd of October 1976 at the age of 82 years after increasing illness and was buried in the complex of the Mosque that he founded, Masjid Riyad al-Salihin, after Dhuhr prayers. His Haul, commemoration is done on the tenth of Shawwal every Hijri year. He had three sons and three daughters with his wife Fatima al-Habshi, his sons are Abdullah, Muhammad and Ali, and his daughters are Nur, Fatima and Khadija. His family and descendants still continue to exercise spiritual influence over the populace of Tanggul, Jember.

== See also ==
- List of modern Sufi scholars
