= Ahmed Skirej =

Moroccan historian

Personal life
- Born: Abu-l-Abbas Ahmed ibn al-Iyyashi Sukayrij al-Khazraji Al-Ansari al-Fasi; 1878 Fez, Morocco
- Died: 1944 (aged 65–66) Marrakesh, Morocco
- Notable works: Kitab kashf al-Hijab ámman talaaqa bi-Shaykh Tijani mina-l As'hab; Bulugh al-Amani bi’l Ijaza li-Murid al-Wird Tijani; Kashf al-Balwa al-Manshura 'ala Majallat Taqwa; Taj Ru’us bi-Tafassuh fi Nawahi Sus; Qadam al-Rusukh fima li-Mu’allifihi min al-Shuyukh; Irshad al-muta-allim wa-al-nasi fi sifat ashkal al-qalam al-Fasi; Al-Sirat al-Mustaqim; Al-Kawkab al-Wahhaj li tawdih al-minhaj; Commentary on the Qasida al-Burda by Busiri
- Known for: His voluminous work on the companions of Sidi Ahmad al-Tijani
- Occupation: Sufi scholar, judge

Religious life
- Religion: Islam

Ahmed Sukayrij or Abu-l-Abbas Ahmed ibn al-Iyyashi Sukayrij al-Khazraji Al-Ansari al-Fasi (1878–1944) was a Moroccan Sufi scholar and judge. He wrote a great number of books, but is especially well known for his voluminous work on the companions of Sidi Ahmad al-Tijani: Kitab kashf al-Hijab ámman talaaqa bi-Shaykh Tijani mina-l As'hab (Raising the veil of the companions who encountered Sheikh Tijani). The Moroccan jurist and shaykh Ahmad sukayrij was a judge (qadi) according to the Maliki legal school of thought (madhab) for Morocco. Not only this, but he is placed alongside Ibrahim Niass on one of the major shaykhs of the tijani Tariqah. The shaykh wrote around 160 books which includes a 20,000 line Nazm on suyuuti's "Khasā'is al kubra" and a 500 line nazm on both a busiri's qasidah burdah and Qadi Iyad's book "shifa". the shaykh had more than 600 Ijazahs and before his death, the shaykh saw qadi ‘iyad in a vision and asked to be buried like him (qadi ‘iyad).

== Books by Ahmed Skirej ==
- Attainment of Aspirations in the Issuing of Permission to the Seeker of the Tijani Litany (Bulugh al-Amani bi’l Ijaza li-Murid al-Wird Tijani)
- Removing the Affliction Published in the Magazine of Piety (Kashf al-Balwa al-Manshura 'ala Majallat Taqwa)
- Crown of Champions in the Excursion in the Surroundings of Sous (Taj Ru’us bi-Tafassuh fi Nawahi Sus)
- Qadam al-Rusukh fima li-Mu’allifihi min al-Shuyukh
- Irshad al-muta-allim wa-al-nasi fi sifat ashkal al-qalam al-Fasi
- Al-Sirat al-Mustaqim
- A comprehensive book of Tijani doctrine, al-Kawkab al-Wahhaj li tawdih al-minhaj (published in Tunis, 1910), written as a commentary on Durrat al-Taj, a central work on Tijani practice by Abdul-Karim Bannis
- A commentary on the Qasida al-Burda by Busiri

== See also ==
- Malick Sy
