= Ahmad Mashhur al-Haddad =

Yemani Islamic scholar (1907 – 1995)

Habib Ahmad Mashhur al-Haddad

Personal life
- Born: 1325 AH (1907 CE)
- Died: 14th Rajab 1416 AH (1995 CE)
- Region: East Africa
- Main interest(s): Sufism, Shafi'i school

Religious life
- Religion: Islam
- Denomination: Sunni
- Jurisprudence: Shafi'i
- Movement: Ba 'Alawiyya

Muslim leader
- Influenced by: Abdullah bin Umar al-Shatiri, Alawi bin Abdullah bin Shihab, Abd al-Bari bin Shaykh al-`Aydarus, Muhammad bin Ahmad al-Mihdar, Abdullah bin Muhsin al-‘Attas, Ahmad bin Muhsin al-Haddar
- Influenced: Timothy Winter, Hamza Yusuf

Ahmad Mashhur al-Haddad (Arabic: أحمد مشهور بن طه الحداد) was a Sunni Islamic scholar from Qaydun in Wadi Dawan, Yemen. He followed the Ba 'Alawiyya way of teaching and spend years proselytizing in East Africa, where he contributed to the establishment of mosques and schools.

He was a descendant of Muhammad's grandson Husayn.

== Education ==
His father spent long periods in Indonesia and his mother, Safiyyah, raised him. She took him to the Ribat of Qaydun at an early age, a religious school founded by his two uncles. His uncle, Habib Alawi, took him to Tarim to learn from the scholars there. His uncle also took him to Indonesia to meet and learn from great scholars there. In Mukalla he met and learned from Habib Ahmad bin Muhsin al-Haddar, and from him he received his spiritual opening.

== Career ==
In 1928 he first traveled to East Africa and taught in the main mosque in Zanzibar during Ramadan. He then settled in Mombasa, Kenya to give da'wa. He kept his own small business to remain financially independent. In 1956 he moved to Kampala, Uganda. He learned Swahili but would often preach in Arabic with a translator. In Uganda he confronted what was happening in terms of the mixing of women and men, the non-compliance of Muslim women with the hijab, and their failure to give inheritance to daughters. He confronted secularists and communists among Muslims who studied in schools established by colonial governments. He also strongly confronted the Qadianis and was able to convert some of them to Sunni Islam. Thousands of people from various backgrounds including Africans, Indians, and Arabs flocked to him for his teaching, advice, and du'a. He would spend his time between the two holy mosques (Mecca and Medina) and Africa.

He was deeply concerned for the Muslim world as a whole and about various conflicts in Muslim countries to the extent that world events could give him physical symptoms. He represented Uganda at the Muslim World League.

== Death ==
He died on Wednesday the 14th of Rajab, 1416 AH (1995 CE). He was buried in Jannat al-Mu'alla.

== Works ==
- Miftah al-Jannah (Key to the Garden)

== See also ==
- List of Sufis
