= Abdullah al-Harari =

Harari Islamic scholar

'Abdullah al-Harari عبد الله الهرري

Personal life
- Born: 1910 Harar, Ethiopia
- Died: September 2, 2008 (aged 97–98)
- Era: 20th–21st century
- Region: Horn of Africa/Levant
- Main interest(s): Kalam, polemics, Hadith, Fiqh
- Notable work(s): Sharh al-'Aqa'id al-Nasafiyya, Sharh al-'Aqida al-Tahawiyya
- Website: www.harariyy.org

Religious life
- Religion: Islam
- Denomination: Sunni
- School: Shafi'i
- Tariqa: Rifa'iyya
- Creed: Ash'ari

Muslim leader
- Influenced by: Al-Shafi'i, Abu al-Hasan al-Ash'ari, Abu Mansur al-Maturidi, Ahmad al-Rifa'i, Muhammad al-'Arabi al-Tabbani
- Influenced: Al-Ahbash, Jamil Halim al-Husaini

'Abdullah al-Harari (Arabic: عبد الله الهرري) (1906 – September 2, 2008) was an Ethiopian muhaddith and scholar of Islamic jurisprudence. He lived and taught in Beirut, Lebanon.

== History ==
Al-Harariyy was born in 1906 in Harar, Ethiopia.

In 1983, he founded Al-Ahbash, a Beirut-based organization also known as the Association of Islamic Charitable Projects (AICP). Al-Ahbash is a Sufi religious movement. Due to the group's origins and activity in Lebanon, the Ahbash have been described as the "activist expression of Lebanese Sufism."

Al-Harariyy was one of the Ulama signatories of the Amman Message. Issued in 2004, the statement gives a broad foundation for defining Muslim orthodoxy. He was also licensed as a Shaykh by Al-Azhar University's branch in Lebanon.

Al-Harariyy died of natural causes on September 2, 2008, aged 102.

== Views ==
Al Harariyy held controversial views regarding Aisha, Mu'awiya, and others. He believed that they were wrong for rebelling against Rashidun Caliph Ali bin Abi Talib during the first fitna and he criticized them for it in his book, al-Dalil al-Sharʿi ʿala Ithbat man Qaatalahum ʿAli min Sahabi aw Tabiʿi, (The legal proof establishing the wrongdoings of the companions and successors whom Ali fought). This is a position that runs contrary to the orthodox Sunni view, which maintains neutrality in regard to disputes among companions.
