= Ahmad Tijani Ali Cisse =

Spiritual leader of the Tijaniyya Sufi order

Sheikh Ahmad Tijani Ali Cisse
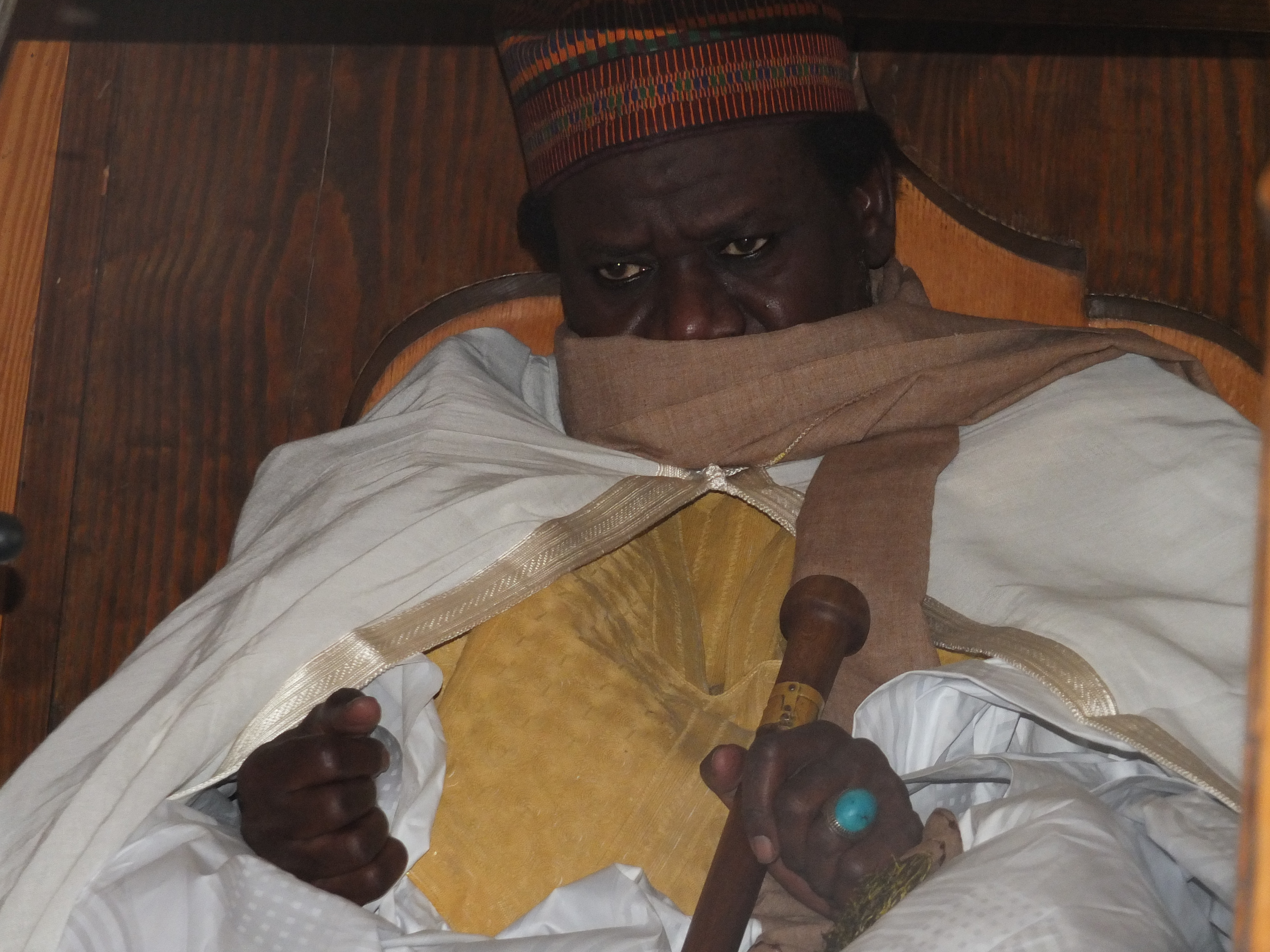
- Born: 1955 (age 70–71)
- Occupation: Spiritual leader of the Tijaniyya Sufi order
- Years active: August 15, 2008 to present

Sheikh Ahmad Tijani Ali Cisse (born 1955) is the spiritual leader of the Tijaniyya Sufi order. The Tijaniyya is the largest Sufi order in Western Africa and its leader is responsible for nearly 300 million Sufi adherents.

== Early life and education ==
Cisse is the second son of Ali Cisse and Fatima Zahra Niasse, daughter of Ibrahim Niass, a major leader of the Tijānī Sufi order. He studied under his father, Ali, and grandfather Ibrahim in Senegal, focusing mostly on Arabic literature and poetry. Thereafter, he went to Egypt, where he lived with his elder brother, the Sufi scholar Hassan Cissé, who was in his final year of advanced study. In 1974, he graduated first in his class at Al-Azhar Preparatory School, receiving a diploma in Arabic. In 1977, he received a B.A. in Arabic Language from Al-Azhar University and in 1981, he earned an M.A. in Theology, later serving on the faculty of Al-Azhar University in the Department of Hadith.

== Career ==
After completing his education in Egypt, he went on a religious mission to Africa, the Middle East, and the Americas to seek converts to Islam (or Dawah) through religious debates and public speaking. At the same time, he published several books, including a complete edition of Shaykh Ibrahim’s Kashif al-Ilbas, published a collection of Shaykh Ibrahim’s writings (which he named Sa’adat al-Anam), and assisted in the publication of a comprehensive collection of Shaykh Ibrahim’s supplications, Kanz al-Masun.

On August 15, 2008, Cisse was unanimously elected to the Imamate by the leading members of the Tijaniyya Sufi order. Cisse is based in Senegal and serves as the Imam of the Grand Mosque in the village of Medina Baye, now part of the city of Kaolack, one of Western Africa's key positions of Islamic leadership. The Tijaniyya Sufi order was founded by Ahmad ibn Muhammad al-Tijani al-Hasani in the late 18th century. As the spiritual leader of the Tijaniyya, Cisse is considered to have direct spiritual inspiration (or Fayda Tijaniyya), which gives him supreme authority to advise and direct the order's followers.

== Honors and accolades ==
In 2001, he was appointed Senegal’s General Commissioner for the Hajj. In 2006, he was appointed by Senegalese President Abdoulaye Wade as a “Special Missions Ambassador.” In 1993, he received Senegal’s distinguished award, the Ordre de Merite. He has been named among the world's 500 most influential Muslims, placing at #23 as of 2012.
