= Ahmad Omar (politician) =

Malaysian politician

Yang Berhormat Haji Ahmad Omar
- احمد عمر
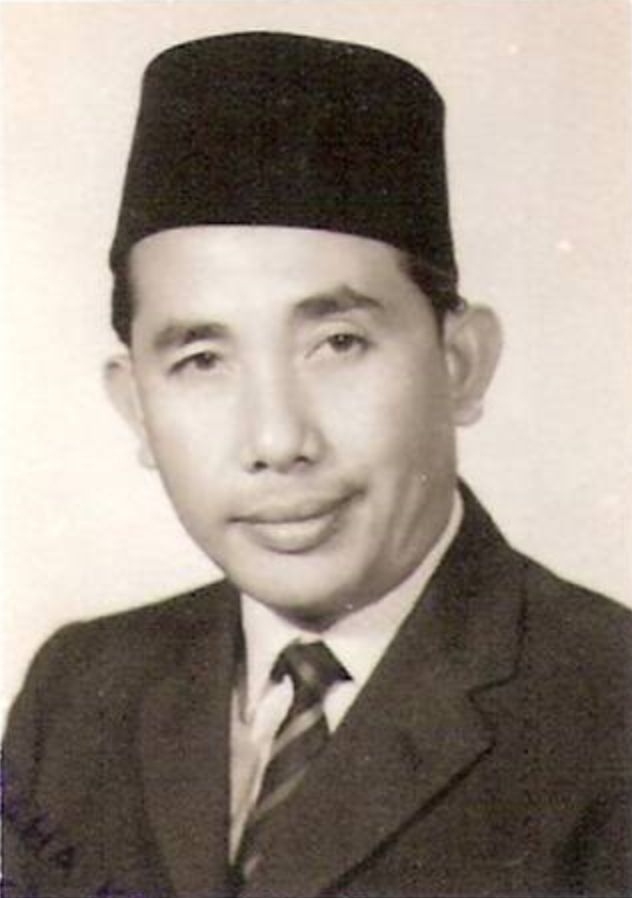

Member of the Terengganu State Legislative Assembly for N22 Binjai, Terengganu
- In office 25 April 1964 – 10 May 1969
- Preceded by: Safie Sulong
- Succeeded by: Mohamed Taib Ismail

Personal details
- Born: Ahmad bin Awang Omar; December 1, 1925 Kuala Terengganu, Terengganu Sultanate
- Died: September 11, 2016 (aged 90)
- Party: United Malays National Organisation (UMNO)
- Spouse: Tek Zaiton binti Yaacob Al Yunani
- Education: American University in Cairo; Birkbeck, University of London
- Occupation: Politician

Haji Ahmad bin Haji Omar (Jawi: حاج احمد بن حاج عمر; 1 Disember 1925 – 11 September 2016) was a Malaysian politician who served as a Member of the State Legislative Assembly of Terengganu for the Binjai constituency, representing UMNO. He was among the Terengganu Malay youth who had the opportunity to study in Egypt and later in the United Kingdom before the formation of the Federation of Malaya.

== Early life ==
Ahmad was born on 1 December 1925 in Kuala Terengganu.

He served as an educator at Madrasah Sultan Zainal Abidin, during which he taught multiple notable people including Wan Mokhtar Ahmad, who would later go on to become the 10th Menteri Besar of Terengganu in 1974.

Ahmad furthered his studies in Cairo, Egypt, in 1949 at the American University in Cairo, alongside another Terengganu statesman, Wan Abdul Kadir.

He would later continue studying at the Birkbeck College, University of London in social sciences, while working at the Malayan High Commission in London.

== Career ==
When the Prime Minister of Malaya, Tunku Abdul Rahman was visiting London to take part in the Conference of the Prime Ministers of the Commonwealth on 15 June 1960, Tunku's secretary, Nik Hassan Has brought Tunku to meet with Ahmad, a close friend of Hassan. After the meeting, Tunku has decided to bring Ahmad back to Malaya, and to cover the expenses for Ahmad to return to his country.

Right after returning to Malaya, Tunku has tasked Ahmad to work as a diplomat while studying in Vienna, Austria, attaching to Jamiah Al-Islam, an organisation catering to Muslim refugees in communist-bloc countries in Europe.

After finly coming back to his hometown in Terengganu, Ahmad joined local politics and contested in the second General Election of Malaysia in 1964 under the Alliance party. He won the Terengganu State Legislative Assembly seat for the Binjai constituency, defeating Pan-Malaysian Islamic Party who previously dominated the constituency.

He also served as the political secretary to the Menteri Besar of Terengganu, Ibrahim Fikri until 1971, and ended his assemblyship after one full term.

== Electoral history ==
Terengganu State Legislative Assembly
Year	Constituency	Candidate	Votes	Pct	Opponent(s)	Votes	Pct	Ballots cast	Majority	Turnout
1964	N22 Binjai	Ahmad bin Hj. Omar (PERIKATAN)	3,111	54.65%	Said bin Abdullah (PRM)	154	2.71%	5,693	794	80.73%
1964	N22 Binjai	Ahmad bin Hj. Omar (PERIKATAN)	3,111	54.65%	Syed Hamzah bin Tahir (PAS)	2,317	40.70%	5,693	794	80.73%
