= Syed Muhammad Zauqi Shah =

Sufi scholar and saint (1878–1951)

Syed Muhammad Zauqi Shah (1878–1951) was a Sufist scholar considered a Waliullah or Sufist saint. He graduated from Aligarh University in India. A member of the Chishti Order of Sufi, his work combined merits of Islamic scholarship and modern knowledge.

He was a close associate of Muhammad Ali Jinnah, and the freedom fighters of India, Muhammad Ali Johar and Shaukat Ali, Abdul Qadir, Muhammad Iqbal, Justice Shah Din, Akbar Allahabadi, Abdul Kalam Azad.

He was the author of several books and articles in English, his masterpiece being Sirr-e-Dilbaran, an alphabetical encyclopedia of Sufi terminology Sufism, now available in English.

He died in 1951 on the 9th day of Zilhajj Hajj (the pilgrimage) in Makkah, and was buried in Arafat, the prayer ground of Hajj. He was a spiritual leader who backed the movement for Pakistan, and strongly supported the Quaid-e-Azam, Muhammad Ali Jinnah. He predicted the creation of Pakistan as early as 1938 through divine visions, and some of his predictions about the future are given in his books and discourses. He was a great lover of Muhammad and stated that the main purpose of Hajj is to visit him. In fact, before his final departure for Hajj from Karachi, he had told some of his disciples that if Muhammad gave him permission to stay, he will not come back.

He was succeeded by four khulafa (caliphs/successors): Maulana Umar Bhai (Bombay); Shah Shahidullah Faridi (Karachi, Pakistan, originally from the UK); Captain Wahid Baksh Rabbani (Bahawalpur, Pakistan), and Maulana Abdus Salam (India).

His discourses were compiled by his khalifas Shah Shahidullah Faridi and Wahid Baksh Sial Rabbani under the title "Tarbiyyat-ul-Ushaq" (Training of the Lovers) and published in English and Urdu.
