= Shah Shahidullah Faridi =

Shaykh Shah Shah Shahidullah Faridi

Personal life
- Born: John Gilbert Lennard; 1915 England, United Kingdom
- Died: 1978 (aged 62–63) Karachi, Pakistan

Religious life
- Religion: Islam
- Denomination: Sunni
- Tariqa: Chishti (Sabiri)

Muslim leader
- Disciple of: Syed Muhammad Zauqi Shah
- Influenced by: Ali al-Hujwiri
- Arabic name
- Personal (Ism): Jān Ghilbart جَان غِلْبَرْت
- Patronymic (Nasab): Linard لِنَرْد
- Epithet (Laqab): Shahīd Allāh شهيد الله
- Toponymic (Nisba): Al-Farīdī الْفَرِيْدِيّ Al-Inglīzī الإِنْجْلِيزِيّ

Shaykh Shah Shahidullah Faridi (né John Gilbert Lennard) (1915–1978) was a British Muslim convert, born to a Christian family.

== Life ==
He embraced Islam after reading "Kashf al-Mahjub" (The Unveiling of the Veiled), the classical treatise on Sufism written by Ali ibn Uthman al-Hujwiri. Though having been born and raised in a wealthy English family he left his home in search of a Sufi shaikh. In India, he eventually met the Chishti Sabri shaikh, Syed Muhammad Zauqi Shah and pledged allegiance to him.

At forty years of age, the responsibilities of spiritual succession were entrusted to him. He lived in Karachi for about thirty years until he died on Ramadan 17th in 1978.

He wrote Inner Aspects of Faith. He also compiled Part Two of "Tarbiatul Ushaq" ("The Training of Divine Lovers"), Syed Mohammad Zauqi Shah, 1425/2004, pub. A.S.Nordeen, Kuala Lumpur, ISBN 983-065-185-1. A brief biography of his, published recently in Urdu called "Talash e Haqq rudad." by Ahmed Ghazali Shaheedi, printed by M. Naeem Hashmi, Saudabad Malir Colony Karachi.

== Selected works ==
- _________ (1970) Everyday practice in Islam Sufi Publishers, Karachi, OCLC 246753, new edition (1979) Mahfil-e-Zauqia, Karachi, OCLC 12205889
- _________ (1976) Spirituality in religion OCLC 28858132
- _________ (1979) Inner aspects of faith Mehfil-e-Zauqia, Karachi, OCLC 7706353, new edition (1985) Nur Academy, Delhi, OCLC 59078626
- _________ (1981) Daglig praksis Da'wa, ISBN 87-87728-22-2
