= Ibrahim Niass =

Senegalese sufi saint (1900–1975)

Shaykh al-Islām Ibrahim Niass
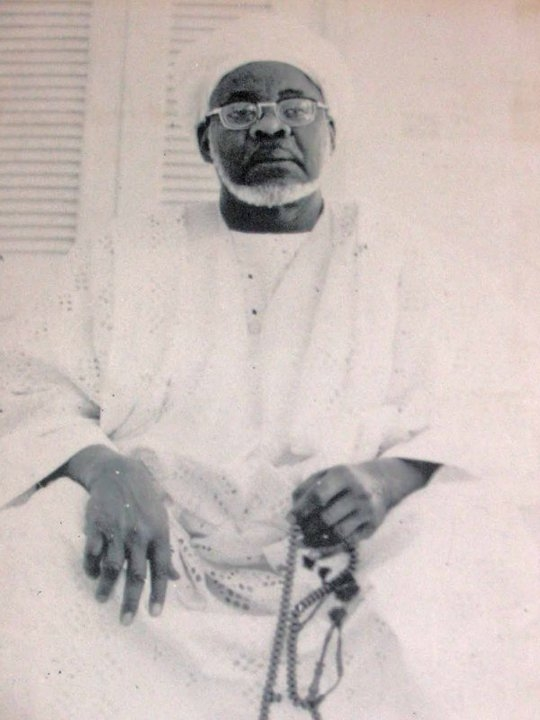
- Shaykh Ibrahim Niasse
- Title: Shaykh al-Islām

Personal life
- Born: Ibrahim Niass; 8 November 1900 Tayba Ñaseen, Kaolack, Senegal
- Died: 26 July 1975 (aged 74) London, United Kingdom
- Relatives: Al-Hadj Abdullah Niass (father) Cheikha Marieme Niass (daughter) Hassan Cisse (grandson), Ahmad Tijani Ali Cisse (grandson), Ousmane Oumar Kane (grandson)Fatima Niass (daughter)

Religious life
- Religion: Islam
- Denomination: Sunni
- Jurisprudence: Maliki
- Tariqa: Tijani
- Creed: Ash'ari

Muslim leader
- Disciple of: Ahmed Skirej

Ibrāhīm Niasse (November 8, 1900 – July 26, 1975)—or French: Ibrahima Niasse, Wolof: Ibrayima Ñas, Arabic: شيخ الإسلام الحاج إبراهيم إبن الحاج عبد الله التجاني الكولخي Shaykh al-'Islām al-Ḥājj Ibrāhīm ibn al-Ḥājj ʿAbd Allāh at-Tijānī al-Kawlakhī —was a Senegalese major leader (wolof) of the Tijānī Sufi order of Islam in West Africa. His followers in the Senegambia region affectionately refer to him in Wolof as Baay, or "father."

Niasse was the first West African to have led al-Azhar Mosque in Egypt, after which he was styled "Sheikh al-Islam". He became close to many freedom fighters in West Africa due to his contribution for Independence in African States. He was friends with and an adviser to Ghana's first President, Kwame Nkrumah, and friends with Gamal Abdel Nasser and King Faisal of Saudi Arabia. Sheikh served as the Vice President of the Muslim World League with Faisal as president.

== Life ==
Born in 1900 in the village of Tayba Ñaseen (spelled Taïba Niassène in French), between the Senegalese city of Kaolack and the border of Gambia, he was the son of Al-Hadj Abdullah Niass (1840–1922), the main representative of the Tijānī Sufi Order, often referred to asTareeqat al-Tijjaniyyaa, in the Saalum region at the beginning of the twentieth century. During his youth, Sheykh Ibrahim relocated with his father to the city of Kaolack, where they established the zāwiya (religious center) of Lewna Ñaseen. After his father's death in Lewna Ñaseen in 1922, Shaykh Ibrāhīm's elder brother, Muhammad al-Khalīfa, became his father's successor or Khalīfa. The 22-year-old Shaykh Ibrāhīm spent most of his time farming in the family's fields and teaching a growing number of disciples in the nearby village of Kóosi Mbittéyeen.

Although Shaykh Ibrāhīm never claimed to be his father's successor, due to his charisma and precocious knowledge, he gained a large number of disciples, and tensions arose between his disciples and those of his elder brother, Muhammad al-Khalifa. In 1929, while on the farm in Kóosi Mbittéyeen, the youthful Shaykh Ibrāhīm announced that he had been given the Key to Secrets of Divine Knowledge, and thus became the Khalifa of Sheykh Tijani in the Tijaniyya Order, a position yet to be attained by anyone as of that time. Sheikh Ibrahim then declared that whoever wishes to attain ma'arifa, a level of Divine Certainty in the Sufi Order, must follow him.

In 1930, after the prayer of ʿĪd al-Fiṭr (the end of the month of Ramadān), a fight broke out between Shaykh Ibrahim's disciples and those of Muhammad al-Khalīfa The incident made Shaykh Ibrahim immediately decide to relocate with his disciples to a new place. That evening, he set out with a small group of his closest disciples to find a new place to live, and the next day they established a new zāwiya in Medina Baay, a village that was later incorporated into the growing city of Kaolack.

In the following years, the shaykh divided his time between teaching during the dry season in Madina Baay and farming during the rainy season in Kóosi Mbittéyeen. During the summer of 1945 he reestablished himself in his father's house in his natal village of Tayba Ñaseen, rebuilding and reorganizing the village after a fire outbreak had destroyed much of it.

Shaykh Ibrahim's fame quickly spread throughout the countryside, and most of his father's disciples ultimately became his disciples in spite of his junior status in the family. Although his disciples remain a minority within Senegal, they form the largest branch of the Tijānīyyah worldwide. In an unlikely role reversal during the 1930s, several leaders of the Arab 'Idaw ʿAli tribe in Mauritania—the same tribe that introduced the Tijānī order to West Africa—declared themselves disciples of Shaykh Ibrahim. Notable among them were Shaykhāni, Muḥammad Wuld an-Naḥwi and Muḥammad al-Mishri. Tareeqa al-Tijaniyya al-Niassiyya, as the shaykh's disciples came to be known, flourished and gained large numbers of followers during the 1930s and 1940s throughout North and West Africa. In 1937 upon meeting Shaykh Ibrahim during a pilgrimage to Makkah, the Emir of Kano, Nigeria, Alhaji 'Abdullahi Bayero gave his oath of allegiance to the shaykh and declared himself a disciple of shaykh Ibrahim. That incident made Shaykh Ibrahim gain the allegiance of many of the prominent Tijānī leaders of Northern Nigeria and also many others who were not Tijani prior to this time.

Politically, the shaykh first supported the Muslim Association Party in the 1950s. He then grew increasingly close to the government of Kwame Nkrumah in the 1960s. This was partly due to their mutual connections (including Djibo Bakary and Aminu Kano), but was also aided by Nkrumah's rising frictions with Christian authorities in Ghana. The shaykh's nephew Habib Niang also became an influential counsellor to the Nkrumah regime and helped shape Consciencism as an official ideology.

Alhaji Abdulmalik Atta - a prince from Okene and the first High Commissioner of Nigeria to the United Kingdom - was one of shaykh Ibrahim's closest disciples as well as the shaykh's father-in-law through his daughter Sayyida Bilkisu. Shaykh Ibrahim became a renowned Shaykh al-Tareeqa (Master of the Sufi Order) throughout the Hausa areas of West Africa. In the end, he had far more disciples outside of Senegal than within it. At the time of his death in 1975 in London, England, Shaykh Ibrahim Niass had millions of followers throughout West Africa.

His branch of the Tijaniyya, Tariqa al-Tijaniyya al-Naissiyya has become the largest branch in the world. After His passing away the community was led by His closest disciple, Shaykh Aliyy Cisse and Niass' eldest son, Alhaji Abdulahi Ibrahim Niass. The current Khalīfa in Medina Baye is his eldest surviving son, Sheikh Muhammad Mahi Niass who became the khalifa in 2020 after the passing away of His brother Sheikh Ahmed Tidiane Niass, on 2 August 2020. Shaykh Ibrahim's role as principal Imam of the Medina Baye mosque has been carried out by the Cisse family. While serving as Medina Baay's Imam, Shaykh Hassan Cisse, Shaykh Aliyy Cisse's son and Shaykh Ibrahim's maternal grandson, carried Shaykh Ibrahim's teachings to the United States, United Kingdom and many other western countries. Shaykh Hassan Cisse was generally regarded as the leader of Tareeqa al-Tijaniyya al-Niasiyya worldwide until his sudden death in August, 2008. Since then, Shaykh Hassan's younger brother Shaykh Tijānī Cisse has been given the position of Medina Baye's Imam.

== Works ==
Niass authored over 50 known works which often covered topics like Sufism, religious teachings (Islam), and poetry. Some of Ñiass's works include:

- Sabil al-salam fi bka'il maqam – a book written to defend the state where the Maqam Ibrahim was situated.
- Kāshif al-'ilbās ʿan Fayḍati l-Khatmi 'Abī l-ʿAbbās ("Lifting the confusion about the Fayḍa [Flood] of the Seal [of the saints] Abū l-ʿAbbās [Ahmad at-Tijānī]"). Edited by Shaykh Tijānī ʿAlī Sīse. Ash-Sharīka ad-dawliyya li-ṭ-ṭibāʿa, Cairo, Egypt.
- Cisse, Ahmad Tijani Ali; Niasse, Ibrahim (2010). The Removal of Confusion Concerning the Flood of the Saintly Seal Ahmad Al-tijani: A Translation of Kashif Al-ilbas an Fayda Al-khatm Abi' Abbas by Shaykh Al-islam Al-hajj Ibrahim - B. Abd-allah Niasse. Fons Vitae. ISBN 978-1-891785-47-4.
- Jawāhir ar-rasā'il ("Pearls of the letters"), a compendium of letters, fatwas, and other short communications by Ibrāhīm Ñas.
- As-sirr al-'akbar ("The greatest secret")*Countless anthologies of poems, which have been published in Ad-Dawāwīn as-SittTranslated into English by Awwal Baba Taofiq ("the Six Anthologies"), Jāmiʿ Jawāmiʿ ad-Dawāwīn ("Collection of collections of Anthologies"), and Majmūʿ Riḥlāt ash-Shaykh 'Ibrāhīm ("The Compendium of Travels of Shaykh Ibrāhīm"). All of these were edited by his son Shaykh Muḥammad al-Ma'mūn Ibrāhīm Ñas.
- Kitāb at-taṣrīf ("The Book of Arabic morphology"), a book commonly used in Arabic schools throughout Senegal.
- Manāsik al-ḥajj al-mubārakah al-musammāt: tuḥfat 'ahl al-ḥādirah bi-mā yanfaʿ al-ḥājj siyyamā fī ṭ-ṭā'irah ("Rituals of the blessed pilgrimage, or: gems for city people to benefit the pilgrim, especially one traveling by airplane"). Edited by Shaykh Tijānī ʿAlī Sīse.
- Ruhul Adab (Spirit of good moral and discipline) translated into English by Sheikh Hassan Cisse.
- AlIfriqiyya lil Ifriqiyyin (Africa for the Africans) African leaders and freedom fighters under chairmanship of Gamal Abd al-Nasser of Egypt entrusted publishing of this book to Sheikh Sani Auwalu a Nigerian disciple of Sheikh Ibrahim Inyass(RA).
- A number of fatwas (legal opinions), including: Wajh at-taḥqīq fī kawn jāmiʿ medīna huwa l-ʿatīq ("Verification that the longstanding rule of the precondition of a mosque is a city"), concerning the circumstances in which a Friday mosque should be built; and Baḥth fī thubūt ru'yat al-hilāl ("Study on establishing the sighting of the new moon"), concerning when to end the month of Ramaḍān and its fast. In addition to his printed works, dozens of cassette tapes of Ibrāhīm Ñas are readily available in Senegal, including complete Tafsīr al-Qur'ān (interpretations of the Qur'an) in Wolof and Arabic, several recitations of the Mawlid an-nabawī (birth [and life] of Muhammad), also in Wolof and Arabic, and speeches on various religious and practical subjects in Wolof. "Dawawin Al-Sittah" (voluminous poetic work in praise & exaltation of Muhammed), "Risalatul-Tauba" (a pamphlet expounding the realities of sincere repentance to Allah)
- Rihlat conakiriyya
- Rihlat comashiyya
- Hujjal baaligha
- Bayaan wa tab'een

== See also ==
- Hassan Cissé
