= Cyrus Ali Zargar =

Islamic studies scholar

- Born: Cyrus Ali Zargar

Academic background
- Education: University of California, Los Angeles (BA) University of California, Berkeley (PhD)

Academic work
- Institutions: University of Central Florida
- Notable works: The Polished Mirror: Storytelling and the Pursuit of Virtue in Islamic Philosophy and Sufism; Sufi Aesthetics: Beauty, Love, and the Human Form in the Writings of Ibn 'Arabi and 'Iraqi

Cyrus Ali Zargar is an Islamic studies scholar and the Endowed Al-Ghazali Distinguished Professor in Islamic Studies at the University of Central Florida in Orlando, Florida. His research mainly focuses on Islamic philosophy, Arabic and Persian literature of medieval Sufism, Classical Sufism and Ethics in literature and film.

== Biography ==
Zargar completed his BA in English Literature in 2000 from the University of California, Los Angeles. He received his MA and PhD in Near Eastern Studies in 2003 and 2008 respectively from the University of California, Berkeley. He has taught at many different institutions including Augustana College, in Rock Island, Illinois, San Francisco State University and University of California, Berkeley. Zargar is a member of American Academy of Religion.

== Works ==
- Sufi Aesthetics: Beauty, Love, and the Human Form in the Writings of Ibn 'Arabi and 'Iraqi. Columbia, South Carolina: University of South Carolina Press, 2011.
- The Polished Mirror: Storytelling and the Pursuit of Virtue in Islamic Philosophy and Sufism. London: Oneworld, December 2017.
- Religion of Love: Sufism and Self-Transformation in the Poetic Imagination of ʿAṭṭār. Albany, New York: State University of New York Press, 2024.
- The Ethics of Karbala: Myths, Modernity, and Virtues of Nobility. London: Routledge, 2024.

== Sources ==
- Nguyen, Martin (2018). Modern Muslim Theology: Engaging God and the World with Faith and Imagination (Religion in the Modern World). Rowman & Littlefield Publishers. p. 84. ISBN 978-1538115008.
