= Muhammad 'Alawi al-Maliki =

Saudi Arabian Islamic scholar (1944–2004)

Shaykh Muhammad ibn Alawi al-Maliki
- Title: Shaykh, Sayyid

Personal life
- Born: 1944 Mecca, Saudi Arabia
- Died: 2004 (aged 59-60) Mecca, Saudi Arabia
- Resting place: Jannat al-Mu'alla, Mecca, Saudi Arabia
- Main interest(s): Tasawwuf, Tafsir, Hadith, Fiqh, Usul al-fiqh, Aqidah, Seerah
- Notable work: Mafahim Yajib an Tusahhah (Conceptions That Need to Be Corrected)
- Education: Al-Azhar University
- Occupation: Islamic scholar; Imam

Religious life
- Religion: Islam
- Denomination: Sunni
- Jurisprudence: Maliki
- Tariqa: Shadhili
- Creed: Ash'ari

Muslim leader
- Students: Ali Gomaa, Gibril Haddad
- Influenced by: Abd al-Aziz al-Ghumari,Ba 'Alawiyya, Mustafa Raza Khan, Ahmad Raza Khan

Muhammad al-Hasan ibn Alawi ibn al-Abbas ibn Abd al-Aziz (1944–2004), also known as Muhammad ibn Alawi al-Maliki, (Arabic: محمد بن علوي المالكي) was one of the foremost traditional Sunni Islamic scholar of contemporary times from Saudi Arabia. He is considered to be the Mujaddid of 20th-21st century.

== Life ==
=== Family background ===
The Maliki family is one of the most respected families in Mecca and has produced great scholars who taught in the Haram of Mecca for centuries. In fact, five of the Sayyid's ancestors have been the Maliki Imams of the Haram of Mecca. Muhammad ibn Alawi al-Maliki was born in Mecca. Due to the well-known nature of their family, they preferred to teach themselves in the Sacred Holy Mosque.

=== Education ===
With his father's instruction, he also studied and mastered the various traditional Islamic sciences of Aqidah, Tafsir, Hadith, Seerah, Fiqh, Usul, Mustalah, Nahw, etc. Scholars of Mecca, as well as Medina, all of whom granted him full Ijazah to teach these sciences to others. Some of the scholars from whom he obtained ijazahs and chains of transmission from include: His father, 'Alawi ibn 'Abbas al-Maliki al-Hasani, al-Habib Ahmad Mashhur Taha al-Haddad, Hasanain Makhlouf, Muhammad al-'Arabi al-Tabbani, Muhammad Hafidh al-Tijani, Amin Kutbi, Mustafa Raza Khan, and numerous others.

=== Career ===
Despite criticism of him, al-Maliki retained prominence. In an attempt to counter Wahabism in the early 1990s, the Government of Saudi Arabia began supporting practitioners of Sufism in the Hijaz region as a way to bolster religious support of the state; al-Maliki became the self-imposed leader of Hijazi Sufism under state sponsorship, with several thousand supporters.

=== Death ===
He died in 2004 and was buried in Mecca. After his death, Saudi dignitaries made condolence visits to his family. Crown Prince 'Abd Allah (the future king) was quoted as stating that al-Maliki "was faithful both to his religion and country" as one western journalist noted, "the rehabilitation of his legacy was almost complete."

== Literary works ==
Al-Maliki has written on a variety of religious, legal, social and historical topics.

=== Selected works on various subjects ===
==== Aqidah ====
- Mafahim Yajib an Tusahhah (Conceptions That Need to Be Corrected)
- Bidaah Menurut Ulama Salaf
- On Celebrating the Birthday of Prophet

==== Seerah ====
- Muhammad the Best of Creation
- Prophet's Night Journey and Heavenly ascent
- Al-Anwar al-Bahiyyah fi Isra wa M’iraj Khayr al-Bariyyah
- Al-Zakha’ir al-Muhammadiyyah
- Prophet in the Barzakh and the Hadith of Isra and Miraj

==== Miscellaneous ====
- Salawat Quraniyyah
- Meluruskan Kesalahpahaman
- Dialah Allah

== See also ==
- List of Sufis
- List of Ash'aris and Maturidis
- Sheikh Abubakr Ahmad
- Arab people
- Maliki
- Islam in Saudi Arabia
