= Muhammad bin Yahya al-Ninowy =

Syrian-born American Islamic Scholar

- محمد بن يحيىٰ النينوي

Personal life
- Born: 1970 (age 55–56) Aleppo, Syria
- Era: Modern
- Region: North America
- Main interest(s): Hadith, Jurisprudence, Theology
- Education: Al-Azhar University The University of Georgia PhD
- Occupation: Islamic Scholar, Researcher, Medical Doctor
- Website: www.madinainstitute.com

Religious life
- Religion: Islam
- Denomination: Sunni / Sufi (Ihsān)
- Jurisprudence: Shafi'i
- Tariqa: Shadhili, Qadiri, Rifaʽi, 'Alawi
- Creed: Athari, Maturidi, Ash'ari

Muslim leader
- Disciple of: Abdullah al-Ghumari, Abdullah al-Talidi, Muhammad Yasin al-Fadani, 'Adab al-Hamsh, Subhi al-Saamurra'iy, Abdullah Sirajuddin, Abdulqadir Isa, Adnan Ghashim

Muhammad bin Yahya al-Ninowy (Arabic: محمد بن يحيىٰ النينوي; born 1970) is a Syrian-born American Islamic scholar, theologian, and medical doctor. He has been listed among The 500 Most Influential Muslims in a publication compiled by the Royal Islamic Strategic Studies Centre in Amman, Jordan.

== Background ==
Al-Ninowy was born in Aleppo, Syria. His lineage traces back to the Islamic Prophet Muhammad through his grandson al-Husayn, His great-grandfather Ibrahim al-Mujab (son of Muhammad al-Abid, son of Musa al-Kazim) known as the answered blind was born in Madina al-Munawwara and buried circa 300 AH in Southern Iraq next to al-Husayn and in his current Mosque. His family moved north to the city of Mosul in the northern Iraqi province of Ninowa, where they were involved in olive oil and other business tradings with the local Kurds, then moved to Aleppo in northern Syria a few hundred years ago.

== Education ==
Al-Ninowy began his study under his father, As-Sayyed Yahya ibn Muhammad, and many of the scholars in Aleppo memorising the Qur'an and acquiring knowledge in Islamic sciences, including Aqidah (Islamic theology), Fiqh (Islamic jurisprudence), Hadith (Prophetic tradition) and Ihsan (Sufism), with ijazah's (certificate to teach). He particularly specializes in the fields of Hadith, Tawhid, and Tazkiyyah/Ihsan.

He attended Al-Azhar University, Faculty of Usool ud-Deen, where he studied under many scholars. He got his PhD in Hadith sciences. He also traveled to seek knowledge under many scholars who resided in Syria, Madina, Mecca, Morocco, Egypt, Sudan, and more. He is the first Ph.D. in Islamic Studies from the Department of Religion at the University of Georgia (UGA).

== Career ==
Al-Ninowy is the Founding Director of Madina Institute, Madina Seminary, and Planet Mercy, with campuses in the United States, the United Kingdom, Canada, South Africa, Norway, Sudan, Turkey, Indonesia and Malaysia.

Through the Madina Institutes and Seminaries, Al-Ninowy is offering Islamic Studies Degree programs geared toward educating Imams and Theological Scholars. Al-Ninowy is considered to be a Muhaddith – a scholar of Hadith sciences. He is the Founding President of Madina Institute in South Africa, a fully accredited university from the Ministry of Higher Education, offering BA, Honors, and Masters's degrees. He is serving his second appointment by HRH the Sultan of Malaysia as a member of the directors of the International Islamic University Malaysia.

He has authored books in theology, hadith, usul, and Sufi sciences. He has been a pioneer working at grass-root levels, to centralize "unconditional compassion and love" as the main themes of religion, and has been the forerunner in promoting non-violence among all people and faith systems worldwide. He is the author of Non-violence: a Fundamental Islamic Principle, and established a school for Non-violence and Peace Studies based on Islamic Principles.

Al-Ninowy is also a spiritual guide and heads a worldwide Shadhili Sufi order under the Alawi-Husayni-Ninowi Zawiyah, that seeks to revive the Tasawwuf of Ahl Al-Hadith www.zawiya.org. In addition to a PhD in Islamic Studies, Al-Ninowy also holds a bachelor's degree in Microbiology from the University of Illinois, and a Doctor of Medicine degree.

Since 2001, al-Ninowy was the Imam and Khateeb of Al-Madina Institute and Masjid located in Norcross, Atlanta, Georgia, United States, where he delivered the weekly khutbah (Friday sermon) and gave a weekly majlis (religious gathering) in Hadith and Tawheed. He moved to establish Madina Institute in Duluth in Atlanta, Georgia where he has been since 2011. He participates in conferences on Islam, world peace, and welfare of humanity.

Al-Ninowy is a professor of theology and was a professor of Physiology and Anatomy at the University system of Georgia.

He has also written on many topics, albeit most of his writing is in Arabic and not yet in print. He has written the forward to a number of books as well as producing his own works in English, including Expressing Delight in the Birth of the Light and The Book of Love, The Forty Hadith on Mercy and Those Who Show Mercy, 40 Hadith on the Virtues of Al-Madina Al-Munawwara, Deterring the Ignorant Aggressor from Transgressing Against Our Lady Fatima.

== Center for Nonviolence and Peace Studies ==
The Center for Non-violence and Peace Studies is an integral part of Madina Institute, a premier destination for Islamic education in which Muslims from all backgrounds can engage traditional Islamic teachings in a healthy and tolerant environment. The primary goal of the Center for Nonviolence and Peace Studies is to continue the Madinan School of Non-violence and Peace as laid down in the Prophetic example, and to challenge global extremism, in both its violent and non-violent forms. Madina Institute's center for Non-violence and Peace Studies offers diploma's and degree programs in non-violence.

== Personal life ==
Al-Ninowy lives with his family in Atlanta, Georgia, United States. He is married, and has three sons and a daughter. His brother Shaykh Sayyid Isa (is the Imam of Masjid Hamzah in Atlanta) and mother also live in Atlanta.
