= Hassan Cissé =

Sufi shaykh and Islamic Imam in Senegal

- Hassan Cissé in Medina Baye, Senegal.
- Born: December 4, 1945; Kaolack, Senegal
- Died: August 14, 2008; Kaolack, Senegal

Religious life
- Religion: Islam
- Denomination: Sunni
- Jurisprudence: Maliki
- Creed: Ash'ari

Shaykh Hassan Cissé (1945-2008) was a preeminent leader of the Tijani Sufi order in the latter half of the 20th century. He was an accomplished Islamic scholar, emerging from a long and vibrant legacy of Islamic learning in West Africa. The grandson and spiritual heir of Shaykh Ibrahim Niass, he was designated by Shaykh Ibrahim as Imam of the Jama’at Nasr al-Ilm (“Community of Helping Knowledge”), the followers of Shaykh Ibrahim who are historically the largest single Muslim movement in twentieth-century West Africa.

Cissé developed a broad relationship with African-American Muslims, frequently visiting the United States and encouraging American Blacks to reconnect with their African Islamic roots that he argued had been impeded by the Atlantic slave trade. His efforts convinced hundreds of African-American Muslims to settle in Cissé's home town of Medina Baye (Kaolack) and led to the establishment of an international Islamic boarding school for them, the African-American Islamic Institute (AAII) Qur’an School. Cisse's advocacy led to many African-Americans, as well as African Britons and others from African Diaspora communities who came to Medina Baye, deciding to join the Tijani order.

His publications include the following:

- “Shaykh Ibrahim Niasse”, Introduction to Pearls from the Divine Flood: Selected Discourses from Shaykh al-Islam Ibrahim Niasse (African American Islamic Institute, 2006).
- “Khutbat al-Kitab”, Introduction to Shaykh Ibrahim Niasse: Kashif al-Ilbas. Cairo: Sharikat al-Dawliyya, 2001.
- Sincere Advice. New York: MIJ Publishing, 2000.
- Spirit of Good Morals of Shaykh Ibrahim Niasse, Translation and Commentary. Detroit: African American Islamic Institute, 1998.
- Shaykh Ibrahim Niasse: Revivalist of the Sunnah. Tariqa Tijaniyya of New York, 1984.

== Relevant literature ==
- Rahman, Samiha (May 2023). "From American to Cisse: Sufism and the remaking of diasporic ties across the Atlantic". Africa. 93 (2): 201–220. doi:10.1017/S000197202300027X.
