= Wahid Baksh Sial Rabbani =

Captain Wahid Baksh Sial Rabbani (1910 – April 21, 1995) was a Pakistani saint in the Chishti (Sabri branch) order of Sufis.

He was initiated into the Chishtiyya Spiritual Order in 1940 by Maulana Syed Muhammad Zauqi Shah (1878–1951). He remained under Zauqi Shah's teaching for about 12 years, and then received khilafat (became his successor), along with Shah Shahidullah Faridi, Maulana Umar Bhai, and Maulana Abdus Salam. He was a practicing Sufi for 54 years until his wisaal (union) at 9:30 am on April 21, 1995.

== Education and career ==
He completed his B.A. and then joined the Bahwalpur State Forces and qualified at the Indian Military Academy Dehra Dun (India) in 1933. He participated in the Second World War in Malaya. He retired from military service in 1946 and joined the Civil Secretariat of the Bahawalpur Government. He was transferred to the West Pakistan secretariat, Lahore, in 1955, and retired in 1968.

== Work ==
=== Books ===
He wrote several important books in Urdu and English, such as

1. Islamic Sufism
2. Mushahida e Haq
3. Maqam e Ganjshakar
4. Reactivsation of Islam
5. Hajj e Zauqi
6. Ruhaniyat e Islam He also translated significant Sufi books from Persian to Urdu, including
7. Mirat ul Asrar
8. Iqtibas ul Anwar
9. Maktoobat i Qudsiya
10. Maqabis ul Majalis
11. Talqeen e Ladunni

=== Translation Work ===
His translations with commentary of Lawaih-e-Jami, Jawami-ul-Kalim, and Kashful Mahjub have also been published. His commentary on Kashful Mahjub (published in Urdu and English and popularly available) is a masterpiece and first-ever in the history of Sufism.

=== Other ===
He also collected his Shaikh Zauqi Shah's discourses and published them under the title Tarbiat-ul-Ushaq (Training of the Lovers), which is now available in English as well. This highly readable and beautifully written book focuses on the highest spiritual states and stations.

He also worked on the history of Sufism and Sufi Texts and Teachings in English, encompassing the entire Muslim world, and wrote United States of Islam, discussing the notion of pan-Islamism, with a vision for the rise of the Muslim world. He also translated Sirr-e-Dilbaran, an encyclopedia of Sufi terminology, a work in Urdu by Zauqi Shah. His articles also appeared in the series "The Sufi Path."

== Followers ==
His followers are in Pakistan, Malaysia, Indonesia, Singapore, Australia, Mauritius, the United States, Canada, France and the United Kingdom.

== Death ==
He was buried in his hometown of Allahabad, in district Rahim Yar Khan (Pakistan).

== Disciples ==
His disciples continue to publish his works and those of other Masters of their Order.
