= Jannat al-Mu'alla =

Cemetery in Mecca, Saudi Arabia

Jannat al-Mu'allah
- جَنَّة ٱلْمُعَلَّاة
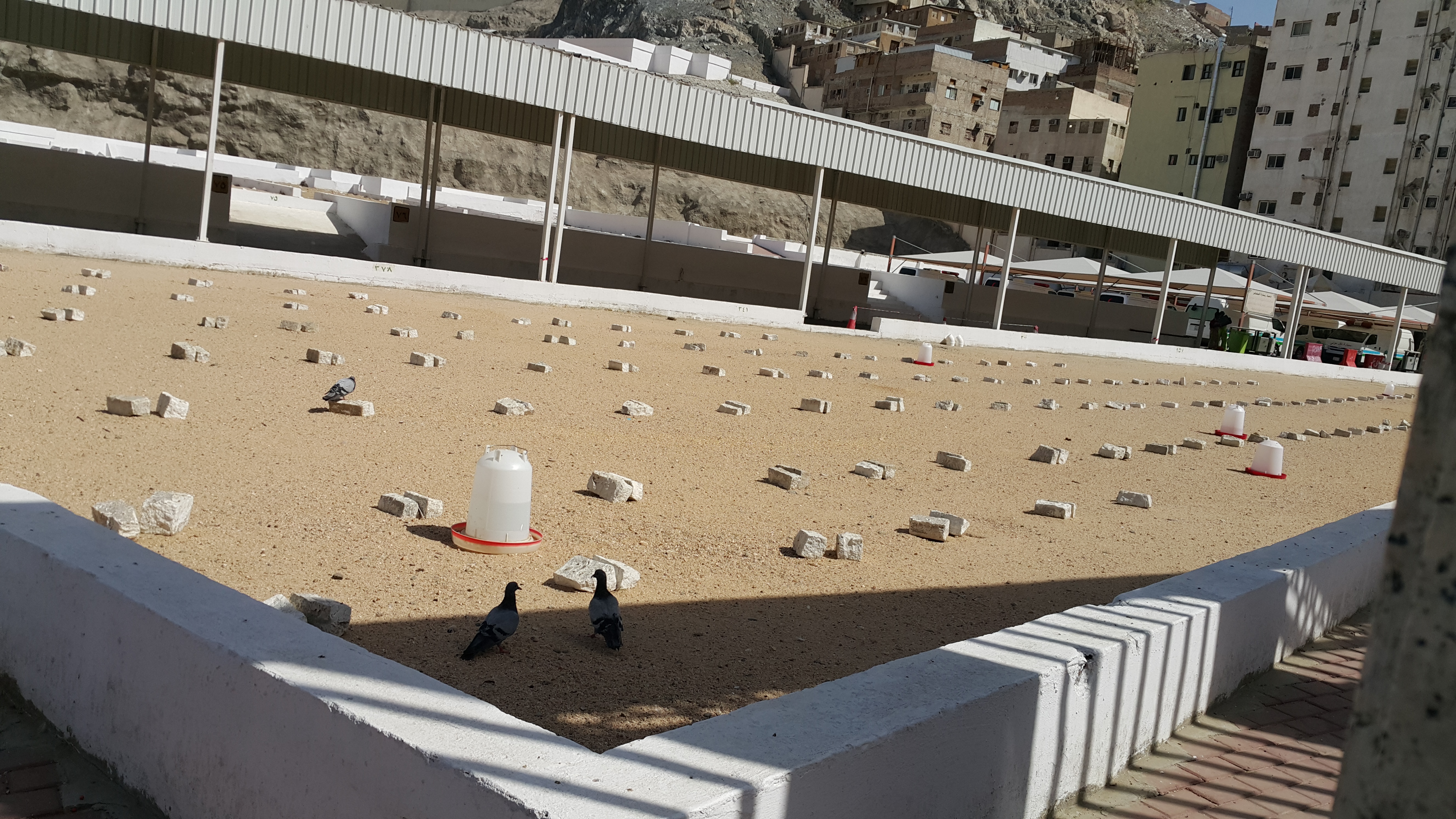
- Jannat al-Mu'alla cemetery
- Interactive map of Jannat al-Mu'allah

Details
- Location: Makkah, Hejaz
- Country: Saudi Arabia
- Coordinates: 21°26′13″N 39°49′45″E
- Type: Muslim
- No. of interments: includes relatives of Muhammad

Jannat al-Mu'alla (Arabic: جَنَّة ٱلْمُعَلَّاة, romanized: Jannah al-Muʿallāh, lit. 'The Most Exalted Paradise'), also known as the "Cemetery of Ma'la" (Arabic: مَقْبَرَة ٱلْمَعْلَاة Maqbarah al-Maʿlāh) and Al-Ḥajūn (Arabic: ٱلْحَجُوْن), is a historic cemetery located to the north of Masjid al-Haram, and near the Mosque of the Jinn in Mecca, Saudi Arabia.

It is believed to be the burial place of several of the prophet Muhammad’s relatives and companions.

== History ==
=== Pre-Islamic and early Islamic era ===
The site of Jannat al-Mu'allā is believed to have been used as a burial ground in pre-Islamic times, and subsequently many of the Quraysh tribe and other notable families of Mecca used it as their cemetery. During the lifetime of Prophet Muhammad, several of his relatives were buried there prior to the Hijrah (622 CE).

=== Ottoman and later developments ===
Over the centuries, several domed tombs, mausolea, and structures were built in the cemetery marking distinguished graves. Several historical travel-accounts such as by the 17th-century Ottoman traveller Evliya Çelebi described 75 domed-tombs in the cemetery including those marking the graves of the Muhammad’s uncle and grandfather.

=== Demolition and Saudi reform era ===
In 1925–1926, following the consolidation of the Hejaz under the rule of Ibn Saud, many tomb structures in the region, including those at Jannat al-Mu'alla and at Al-Baqi, were removed. The actions formed part of a broader program of religious and urban reform promoted by the emerging Saudi state, which sought to align public spaces with interpretations of Islamic practice associated with the Wahabi movement. These reforms emphasized the avoidance of architectural forms or practices that might encourage excessive veneration of graves.

Some Shiites continue to mourn the day the House of Saud demolished shrines in al-Baqi, which has been named Yaum-e Gham (Day of Sorrow), and protest the Saudi government's demolition of these shrines.

== Notable interments ==
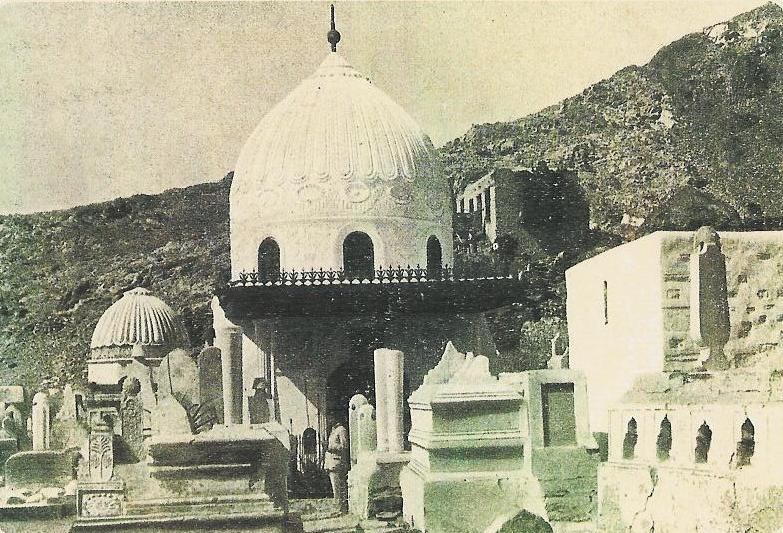
Khadija's tomb at Jannat al-Mu'alla cemetery, before its destruction in 1925

Historical figures buried here include:

Name	Notes
Relatives and Companions of Muhammad
Abu Talib ibn Abd al-Muttalib	Uncle of Muhammad; father of Ali and Chief of Banu Hashim
Abd Manaf	Great-great-grandfather of Muhammad and Ali
Abd al-Muttalib	Grandfather of Muhammad and Ali
Khadijah	The wife of Muhammad and mother of Zainab, Fatimah, Ruqayya and Umm Kulthum of Banu Asad (tribe)
Qasim ibn Muhammad	The first born son of Muhammad and Khadijah
Asma bint Abu Bakr	A female companion of Muhammad, elder daughter of first caliph Abu Bakr, and wife of Zubayr.
Abdallah ibn al-Zubayr	A companion of Muhammad and a nephew of Aisha
Notable burials of scholars and mashaikh
al-Mansur	Second Abbasid Caliph and the founder of Baghdad
Rahmatullah Kairanwi	19th-century Indian Sunni Muslim scholar and author of Izhar ul-Haqq
Imdadullah Muhajir Makki	Another 19th-century Indian Muslim scholar
Abu Turab al-Zahiri	20th-century Muslim cleric
Muhammad Alawi al-Maliki	20th-century Sunni Muslim cleric
Mulla Ali Qari Herawi	Sunni scholar of Tafseer Quran, Fiqh, Theology, Arabic Language
Ahmad Mashhur al-Haddad	Sunni scholar of Islam prominent in Yemen, Africa, and Saudi Arabia
Sheikh Ismail Mahamud Cigaal	Sunni scholar of Islam prominent in Somalia and East Africa

== See also ==
- Jannat al-Baqi'
- Bab Saghir
- Holiest sites in Sunni Islam
- Holiest sites in Shia Islam
