= Ahmed Tijani Ben Omar =

American Islamic scholar

Shaykh Ahmed Tijani Ben Omar
- Title: Shaykh

Personal life
- Born: Asamankese, Ghana
- Era: Modern
- Region: North America
- Education: Kulliyat Athakaffah Al Arabiyah
- Occupation: Islamic scholar, Imam
- Website: www.ahmedtijani.com

Religious life
- Religion: Islam
- Denomination: Sunni (Sufism)
- Tariqa: Tijaniyyah
- Creed: Ashʿarī
- Arabic name
- Personal (Ism): Aḥmad أحمد
- Patronymic (Nasab): ibn ʿUmar بن عمر
- Toponymic (Nisba): at-Tijānī التجاني

Ahmed Tijani Ben Omar (Arabic: أحمد تيجاني بن عمر) is a Ghanaian born American Islamic scholar and Imam.

== Education ==
Tijani was born in Accra, Ghana. His hometown is Asamankese, West Akim Municipal District, Ghana. He specialised in Islamic Law and Jurisprudence, including comparative religion, astronomy, spiritual science and healing, divine poetry and chanting, fine arts and culture.

He took Arabic and Islamic Studies at the Kulliyat Athakaffah Al Arabiyah in Ghana and studied Biblical Science and History through the Methodist Missionary High School in Ghana. He specialised in media-broadcasting and mass-communications and also obtained masters in comparative religion. He studied and memorized the Qur'an at the age of 15 and the Bible by the age of 20.

== Career ==
Tijani is a leader of the Tijaniyyah, which came to the United States in the 1970s. He is also the National Advisor International Association of Sufism USA; Advisor Islamic Studies and Research Association ISSRA USA; President and Imam Universal Islamic Center USA; Member of the World Council of Religious Leaders under the auspices of The United Nations Millennium World Peace Summit.

He has traveled to over 115 countries worldwide giving numerous lectures and presentations at conferences, universities and public gatherings around the world. Hosted and directed several national and international Islamic conferences for peace.

Tijani spends his time between the United States and Africa. He has been involved in peacemaking work in Chicago's inner cities and inter-faith activity across the world. He opposes literalism and extreme Wahhabi theology.

== See also ==
- Ghanaian American
- Tijaniyyah
- Sufism
