= Thomas Allen (baritone) =

English operatic baritone (born 1944)

Sir Thomas Allen CBE FRCM

Chancellor of Durham University
- In office 1 January 2012 – 28 June 2023
- Vice-Chancellor: Chris Higgins; Ray Hudson (acting); Stuart Corbridge; Karen O'Brien
- Preceded by: Bill Bryson
- Succeeded by: Fiona Hill

Personal details
- Born: Thomas Boaz Allen; 10 September 1944 (age 82) Seaham, County Durham, England
- Education: Ryhope Grammar School
- Alma mater: Royal College of Music
- Awards: Honorary Membership of the Royal Academy of Music (Hon RAM); Honorary Doctor of Music

Sir Thomas Boaz Allen CBE FRCM (born 10 September 1944) is an English operatic baritone. He is widely admired in the opera world for his voice, the versatility of his repertoire, and his acting—leading many to regard him as one of the best lyric baritones of the late 20th century. From 2012 to 2022 he served as Chancellor of Durham University.

== Early years ==
Born to Florence and Thomas Allen in the mining village of Seaham Harbour, County Durham, in 1944, Thomas Allen studied at Ryhope Grammar School from 1955 to 1964, becoming captain of his house and later head boy while also doing well in sports, such as in athletics, rugby and especially golf.

It was during his time at school that his singing voice was first observed by the then Physics master, Denis Weatherley, himself a well-known baritone in the county and especially renowned for Northumberland songs. Weatherley would then go on to be Allen's first tutor, training the young baritone during lunch breaks.

Allen's initial ambition was to be a doctor but this was later abandoned when he won a place at the Royal College of Music in 1964, where he studied with Hervey Alan for four years, specialising in oratorio and Lieder until 1968.

In his final term he made his operatic stage debut as the baritone lead in the Royal College of Music Opera School production of Arthur Benjamin's opera Prima Donna. He also won the prestigious Queen's Prize while studying at the college which allowed him to study under James Lockhart, who noticed his talents. Under Lockhart, Allen then shifted his attention from Lieder and oratorio to opera and in 1969, he made his debut as D'Obigny in Verdi's La traviata with the Welsh National Opera (WNO). His early roles with the WNO also included Mozart's Almaviva, Guglielmo and Papageno, Rossini's Figaro, Falke in Die Fledermaus, Billy Budd, Posa, Eugene Onegin and Germont.

In 1971, he made his Covent Garden debut as Donald in Billy Budd and he joined the company the following year. His solo Glyndebourne Festival debut was as Papageno in 1973.

On 7 August 1974, during a BBC Proms performance of Carmina Burana with André Previn and the London Symphony Orchestra, Allen collapsed at the end of his second solo, tried to recover for his third but collapsed again and was taken from the stage; he was replaced by Patrick McCarthy. From 1972 to 2009, Allen appeared in 27 Proms.

He returned as Figaro in Mozart's The Marriage of Figaro (1974), Guglielmo (1975) and Don Giovanni (1977) and it was during this time that he was hailed by one music critic as the finest English baritone since Sir Charles Santley. He made his Metropolitan Opera debut in 1981 as Papageno. He left Covent Garden to become a freelance singer in 1979 although he still remains a guest artist with the company. He sang the title role in the British stage premiere of Busoni's Doktor Faust for the English National Opera in 1986 (a performance which was also commended in the 1986 Laurence Olivier Awards when the production won the award for Outstanding Achievement in Opera), while his debut at the Salzburg Festival was as Ulisse in Monteverdi's Il ritorno d'Ulisse in patria in 1985. His Chicago debut was Rossini's Figaro in The Barber of Seville in 1989.

== Later career ==
Allen has performed Eisenstein in Die Fledermaus, Don Alfonso, Ulisse and Don Giovanni at the Bayerische Staatsoper, Don Giovanni at La Scala, Yeletsky (in The Queen of Spades), Sharpless (in Madama Butterfly), and the title role in Sweeney Todd at the Royal Opera House, Eisenstein at the Glyndebourne Festival, Don Alfonso at the Salzburg Easter and Summer Festivals, Forester (The Cunning Little Vixen) at the San Francisco Opera and Beckmesser (in Die Meistersinger von Nürnberg) at the Metropolitan Opera in New York.

Allen also appears in recital in the United Kingdom, throughout Europe, in Australia and America, with his recital repertoire no less extensive than his operatic one; ranging from German Lieder, French songs by Duparc, and English song cycles by Ralph Vaughan Williams to musical numbers by Rodgers and Hammerstein, Jerome Kern and Cole Porter. He has also recorded oratorio and choral works such as Brahms' Ein deutsches Requiem, Handel's Saul, and Orff's Carmina Burana. The greatest part of his repertoire has been extensively recorded with such distinguished conductors as Sir Georg Solti, James Levine, Sir Neville Marriner, Sir Bernard Haitink, Sir Simon Rattle, Wolfgang Sawallisch and Riccardo Muti.

In 1989, he was made a Commander of the Order of the British Empire (CBE). In 1999, he was knighted. Both awards were for his services to opera. In 1998 he was named a member of the Royal Opera's Opera Advisory Board, the first time a singer had been given such an appointment.

Allen's first book, Foreign Parts – A Singer's Journal was published in 1993. In November 2002, he directed for the first time in Britten's Albert Herring at the Royal College of Music. Other directorial credits include Mozart's Così fan tutte and Don Giovanni (for Samling, of which he is the patron) at Sage Gateshead. In 2006, he made his American directorial debut with a production of Mozart's The Marriage of Figaro for Arizona Opera. In 2007, he directed a new production of The Barber of Seville for Scottish Opera. He has directed a new production of The Marriage of Figaro for the company which premiered in Glasgow in October 2010. He also performed as the Narrator/Dr. Pangloss in the 2005 concert of Leonard Bernstein's Candide at Avery Fisher Hall at Lincoln Center, New York City.

Allen performed in total 50 roles with the Royal Opera company, with Faninal from Richard Strauss' Der Rosenkavalier marking his 50th role in December 2009. The 25th anniversary of his debut at the Metropolitan Opera was celebrated in 2006. Allen has also been revealed as being the model and inspiration in developing the now famous character of Billy Elliot in the play of the same name by Lee Hall.

In September 2008, he performed under the direction of Woody Allen in Puccini's Gianni Schicchi for the Los Angeles Opera as well as at the Spoleto Festival in June 2009. The year 2009 marked the 40th anniversary of his professional debut at the WNO in 1969, also marking the four decades he has been in the opera world. During the same year, he took part in the annual BBC Proms, singing songs from numerous MGM musicals such as Gigi, Kismet and On the Town at the Royal Albert Hall, London. In the 2009/10 opera season, he appeared in operas in America, Germany and the United Kingdom; as Faninal in Der Rosenkavalier, Don Alfonso in Così fan tutte, Prosdocimo in Il turco in Italia and Gianni Schicchi at Covent Garden.

On 11 October 2011 Allen was appointed Chancellor of Durham University by the University's Convocation, to serve from 1 January 2012 in succession to Bill Bryson, remaining until July 2022. His first concert with the university took place in Durham Cathedral on 1 June 2013, appearing alongside over 100 student performers. On 27 January 2012, Allen marked his 40th anniversary at the Royal Opera House, Covent Garden, singing the role of Don Alfonso in Così fan tutte.

In 2015, he sang the role of Baron Zeta in the Metropolitan Opera's production of Franz Lehár's operetta The Merry Widow, which he reprised at the Met in 2017.

At the 2025 Gramophone Awards he was given the Lifetime Achievement award.

== Personal life ==
He is a supporter of Sunderland A.F.C. In 2011, he took part in the Sunderland A.F.C. charity Foundation of Light event.

== Honours ==
- Bayerischer Kammersänger, awarded by the Bavarian State Opera
- Honorary Membership of the Royal Academy of Music
- Visiting Professor of Singing at the Royal Academy of Music
- Hambro Visiting Professorship of Opera Studies at Oxford University
- Honorary Fellow of Jesus College, Oxford
- Fellowship of the Royal College of Music
- Fellowship of the University of Sunderland
- M.A. from University of Newcastle
- Doctor of Music (DMus) degree from Durham University and the University of Birmingham.
- In the 1989 New Year Honours he was created a Commander of the Order of the British Empire (CBE)
- In the 1999 Queen's Birthday Honours he was made a Knight Bachelor and therefore a sir
- The Queen's Medal for Music 2013.

His film credits include The Real Don Giovanni and Mrs Henderson Presents.

== See also ==
- Massenet: Werther (Colin Davis recording)
- Mozart: Le nozze di Figaro (Georg Solti recording)

Academic offices
Preceded by Bill Bryson	Chancellor of Durham University; 2012–22	Succeeded by Fiona Hill
