= List of vice-chancellors and wardens of Durham University =

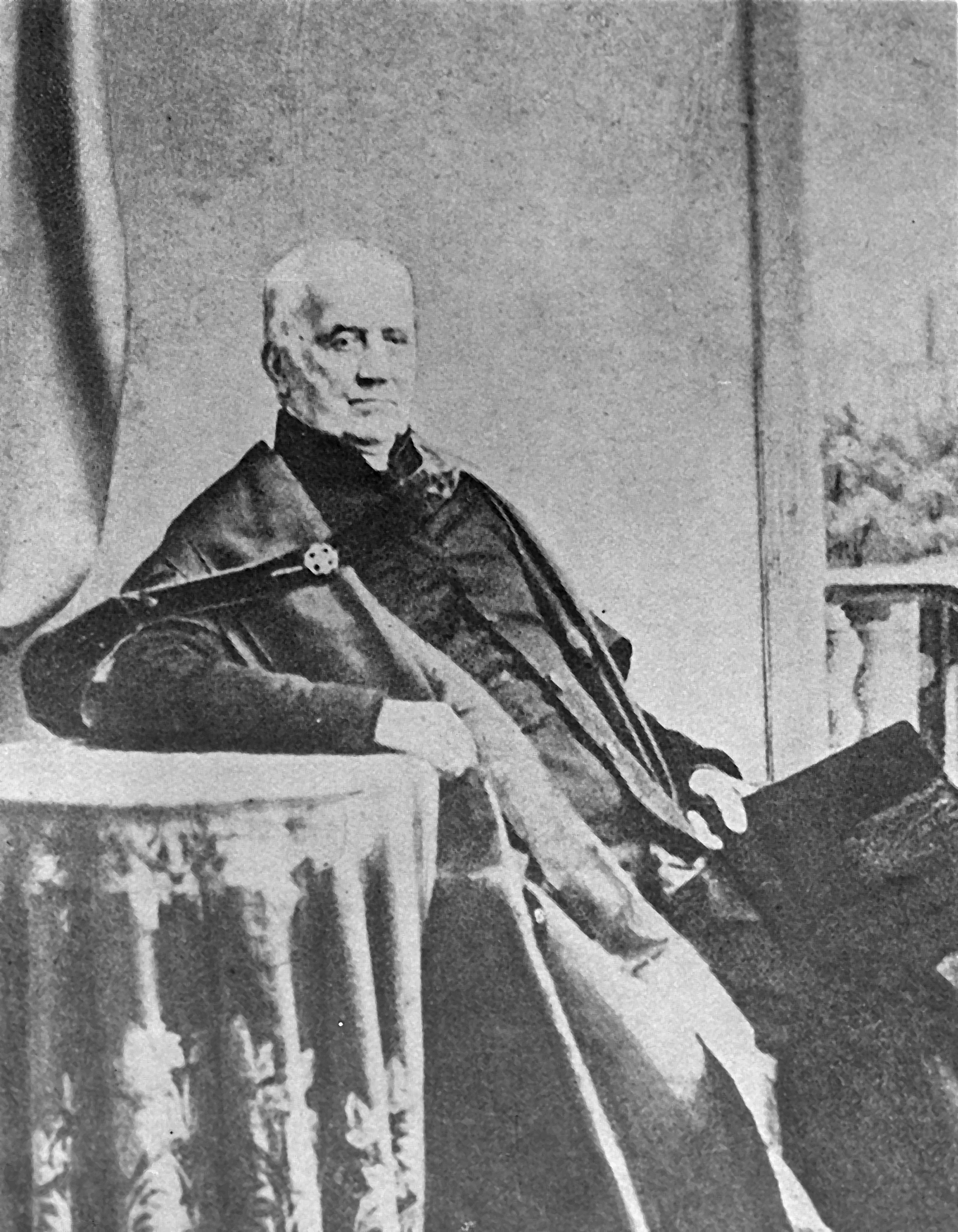
Archdeacon Charles Thorp, the first warden of Durham University

The vice-chancellor and warden is the chief executive officer of Durham University. The vice-chancellor also holds the position of "Warden of the Durham Colleges" and is appointed by Council. Reporting to the vice-chancellor and warden (and also members of the university executive committee) are the deputy vice-chancellor, pro-vice-chancellors for research, education and each of the faculties (Arts and Humanities, Science, and Social Science and Health), the pro-vice-chancellor and deputy warden of the colleges, the registrar (chief operating officer) and the treasurer (chief financial officer).

Under the original constitution of the university, the post of Warden combined the roles of chief executive and formal head of the university. Charles Thorp was appointed acting warden in December 1831 by Bishop William van Mildert, and in 1834 he was appointed to the position on a permanent basis by the dean and chapter of Durham Cathedral (who were then the governors of the university). After Thorp's death in 1862, the post of Warden was held ex officio by the Dean of Durham, with Sub-Warden (which had previously been rotated between the professors of the university) becoming a permanent post, presaging the vice-chancellorship. (Note: The Durham University Records webpage lists the Wardens with the Chancellors and the Sub-Wardens with the Vice-Chancellors) From 1909, with the creation of the federal university, and the handing over of the dean and chapter's responsibilities to the newly formed council, the executive and formal roles were officially separated into the vice-chancellor (executive head) and the chancellor (formal head), with the warden becoming the chancellor and the sub-warden becoming the vice-chancellor. The vice-chancellor was elected by the council to serve a two-year term. In 1937 the permanent posts of Warden of the Durham Colleges and Rector of King's College were created, with the vice-chancellorship being held by each for two years at a time.

With King's College becoming Newcastle University in 1963, the wardenship of the Durham Colleges was permanently united with the vice-chancellorship as the vice-chancellor and warden. The university numbered Chris Higgins as its 23rd vice-chancellor and warden, implying a count starting with the university's reconstitution in 1909 and continuing through the further reconstitutions in 1937 and 1963 despite the changes of title over this period.

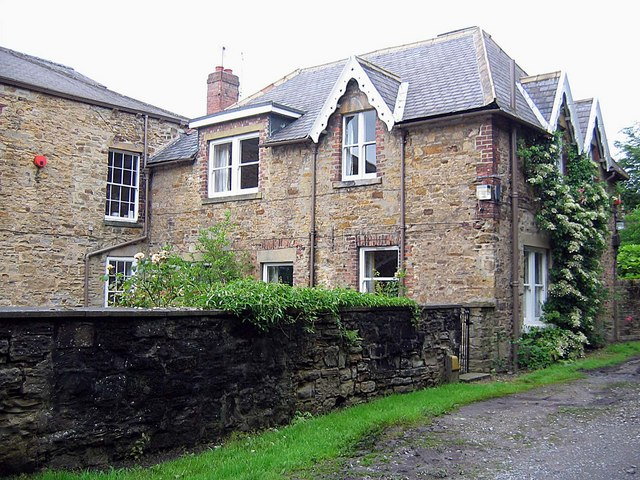
Hollingside House, the official residence of the vice-chancellor

The official residence of the vice-chancellor and warden is Hollingside House, formerly home to John Bacchus Dykes.

In May 2021, the University Council announced that Professor Karen O’Brien would become the university's first female vice-chancellor and warden, taking her post in January 2022. Antony Long, the deputy vice-chancellor and provost, served as interim vice-chancellor from August 2021 until January 2022.

== Wardens of Durham University ==
Source: Durham University records.

- 1831–1834 Charles Thorp (acting)
- 1834–1862 Charles Thorp
- 1862–1869 George Waddington
- 1869–1894 William Lake
- 1894–1909 George William Kitchin

=== Sub-wardens ===
Source: Fowler (1904) and Durham University records.

- 1839–1840 Henry Jenkyns (Professor of Divinity)
- 1840–1841 Temple Chevallier (Professor of Mathematics and Astronomy)
- 1841–1842 Henry Jenkyns
- 1842–1843 John Edwards (Professor of Greek and Classical Literature)
- 1843–1844 Temple Chevallier
- 1844–1845 Henry Jenkyns
- 1845–1846 John Edwards
- 1846–1847 Temple Chevallier
- 1847–1848 Henry Jenkyns
- 1848–1849 John Edwards
- 1849–1850 Temple Chevallier
- 1850–1851 Henry Jenkyns
- 1851–1852 John Edwards
- 1852–1853 Temple Chevallier
- 1853–1854 Henry Jenkyns
- 1854–1855 John Edwards
- 1855–1856 Temple Chevallier
- 1856–1857 Henry Jenkyns
- 1857–1858 John Edwards
- 1858–1859 Temple Chevallier
- 1859–1860 Henry Jenkyns
- 1860–1861 John Edwards
- 1861–1871 Temple Chevallier
- 1872 Thomas Saunders Evans
- 1872–1880 Adam S. Farrar
- 1880–1895 Robert J. Pearce
- 1895–1902 Alfred Plummer
- 1902–1909 Frank Byron Jevons

=== Vice Wardens ===
Since 1967, the post of Vice Warden has been held in plurality with that of Pro-Vice-Chancellor.

== Vice-chancellors ==
Source: Durham University records.

- 1910–1912 Frank Byron Jevons (Master of Hatfield Hall)
- 1912–1914 George Hare Philipson (President of the College of Medicine)
- 1914–1916 Henry Gee (Master of University College)
- 1916–1918 William Henry Hadow (Principal of Armstrong College)
- 1918–1920 John Stapylton Grey Pemberton (President of the Council of Durham Colleges)
- 1920–1922 David Drummond (President of the College of Medicine)
- 1922–1924 Arthur Robinson (Master of Hatfield College)
- 1924–1926 Theodore Morison (Principal of Armstrong College)
- 1926–1928 Percy John Heawood (Professor of Mathematics)
- 1928–1930 Thomas Oliver (President of the College of Medicine)
- 1930–1932 Henry Ellershaw (Master of University College)
- 1932–1934 William Sinclair Marris (Principal of Armstrong College)
- 1934–1936 Stephen Moulsdale (Principal of St Chad's College)
- 1936–1937 Robert Bolam (President of the College of Medicine)
- 1937–1938 James Duff (Warden of the Durham Colleges 1937–1960)
- 1939–1940 Eustace Percy (Rector of King's College 1937–1951)
- 1941–1942 James Duff
- 1943–1944 Eustace Percy
- 1945–1946 James Duff
- 1947–1948 Eustace Percy
- 1949–1950 James Duff
- 1951 Eustace Percy
- 1952 Charles Bosanquet (Rector of King's College 1951–1963)
- 1953–1954 James Duff
- 1955–1956 Charles Bosanquet
- 1957–1958 James Duff
- 1959–1960 Charles Bosanquet
- 1961–1963 Derman Christopherson (Warden of the Durham Colleges from 1960)

== Vice-chancellors and wardens ==
Source: Durham University records except where otherwise noted.

- 1963–1978: Sir Derman Christopherson
- 1979: William K. R. Musgrave (acting)
- 1980–1990: Frederick Holliday
- 1990–1998: Evelyn Ebsworth
- 1998–2007: Kenneth Calman
- 2007–2014: Christopher Higgins
- 2014–2015: Ray Hudson (acting)
- September 2015–2021: Stuart Corbridge
- 2022–present: Karen O'Brien

== Pro-vice-chancellors ==
Source: Durham University records.

The post of pro-vice-chancellor (PVC) was created, along with those of chancellor and vice-chancellor, by the Durham University Act 1908. The number of PVCs has varied over the years, from three over 1910–1937, dropping to one from 1937–1967 (held over 1937–1963 in rotation with the office of vice-chancellor), and rising since then to reach the current five in 2021. From 2004 to 2016 one of the PVCs was 'pro-vice-chancellor and deputy vice-chancellor'; from 2016 this became the 'deputy vice-chancellor and provost'. Since the mid 2010s, the PVCs have had responsibility for specific portfolios–as of 2023, these are: education; research; colleges and student experience; global; and equality, diversity and inclusion, but have previously also included PVCs for each of the university's faculties.

- 1910–1911 George Hare Philipson
- 1910–1916 William Henry Hadow
- 1910–1916 John Stapylton Grey Pemberton
- 1912–1914 Frank Byron Jevons
- 1914–1918 George Hare Philipson
- 1916–1918 Henry Gee
- 1916–1921 Frank Byron Jevons
- 1918–1919 David Drummond
- 1920–1923 Theodore Morison
- 1920–1926 John Stapylton Grey Pemberton
- 1922–1926 David Drummond
- 1924–1930 Arthur Robinson
- 1926–1930 Theodore Morison
- 1927–1928 Robert Howden
- 1928–1932 Percy John Heawood
- 1930–1932 Thomas Oliver
- 1930–1932 William Sinclair Marris
- 1932–1936 Robert Alfred Bolam
- 1932–1937 John Stapylton Grey Pemberton
- 1932–1934 Stephen Richard Platt Moulsdale
- 1934–1937 William Sinclair Marris
- 1936–1937 Stephen Richard Platt Moulsdale
- 1937–1939 Eustace Percy
- 1939–1941 James Duff
- 1941–1943 Eustace Percy
- 1943–1945 James Duff
- 1945–1947 Eustace Percy
- 1947–1949 James Duff
- 1949–1951 Eustace Percy
- 1951–1953 James Duff
- 1953–1955 Charles Bosanquet
- 1955–1957 James Duff
- 1957–1959 Charles Bosanquet
- 1959–1960 James Duff
- 1960–1961 Derman G. Christopherson
- 1961–1962 Charles Bosanquet
- 1962–1963 Walter A. Whitehouse
- 1963–1969 Sidney Holgate (PVC and vice-warden from 1967)
- 1967–1970 George Rochester
- 1969–1973 Leonard Slater
- 1970–1979 William K. R. Musgrave
- 1973–1974 Mary Holdsworth
- 1974–1982 James L. Brooks
- 1979 George M. Brown
- 1979–1984 Eric Sunderland
- 1982–1985 Irene Hindmarsh
- 1984–1990 John I. Clarke
- 1985–1988 Edward C. Salthouse
- 1987–1992 James P. Barber
- 1988–1994 Graham E. Rodmell
- 1991–1997 Peter D. B. Collins
- 1992–1999 Michael Prestwich
- 1994–2000 Barry S. Gower
- 1997–2004 John Howard Anstee
- 1999–2005 Joy Annette Palmer-Cooper
- 2000–2006 Alan Bilsborough
- 2004–2007 Philip Alan Jones
- 2005–2008 James Stirling
- 2007–2008 Gillian May Nicholls
- 2007–2016 Ray Hudson
- 2008–2014 Tom McLeish
- 2008–2012 Anthony Forster
- 2008–2015 Robin Coningham
- 2012–2015 Tom Ward
- 2011–2016 Graham Towl (and deputy warden of the colleges)
- 2014–2018 Claire Warwick (education portfolio from 2017)
- 2015–2019 Tim Clark (social sciences and health portfolio from 2017)
- 2016–2019 Owen Adams (colleges and student experience)
- In 2017 Patrick Hussey (science)
- In 2017 David Cowling (arts and humanities)
- 2017–2021 Alan Houston (education)
- 2019–present Colin Bain (research)
- 2018–present Claire O'Malley (global)
- 2019–present Jeremy Cook (colleges and student experience)
- 2021–present Shaid Mahmood (equality, diversity and inclusion)
- 2021–present Tony Fawcett (education)

=== Pro-vice-chancellors and deputy vice-chancellors ===
- 2004–2007 Philip Alan Jones
- 2011–2016 Ray Hudson

=== Deputy vice-chancellors and provosts ===
- 2016–2022 Antony Long
- 2022–2023 Richard Crisp (acting); formerly Deputy Provost
- 2023–present Mike Shipman

== See also ==
- List of chancellors of Durham University
- Priors and wardens of Durham College, Oxford
- List of Durham University people
- History of Durham University
