= School of Pedagogical and Technological Education =

Public university in Greece

- Ανώτατη Σχολή Παιδαγωγικής και Τεχνολογικής Εκπαίδευσης
- Seal of ASPETE
- Type: Public higher education institution
- Established: 1959; 67 years ago (SELETE/Σ.Ε.Λ.Ε.Τ.Ε.); 2002; 24 years ago (ASPETE/Α.Σ.ΠΑΙ.Τ.Ε.)
- Affiliations: GWU, Roehampton University, HNU
- President: Georgios Chatzarakis
- Students: 2,000
- Location: Athens, Attica, Greece
- Campus: Marousi
- Website: aspete.gr

The School of Pedagogical and Technological Education (Greek: Ανώτατη Σχολή Παιδαγωγικής και Τεχνολογικής Εκπαίδευσης, romanized: Anṓtatī Scholī́ Paidagōgikī́s kai Technologikī́s Ekpaídeusīs) or ASPETE (Α.Σ.ΠΑΙ.Τ.Ε.) is a Greek University which specializes in training teachers.

== Overview ==
ASPETE is a self-administered public legal entity operating in accordance with article 16, para. 5 of the Constitution, the provisions of Law 3027/2002, and the School’s Regulation. Following from the adoption of Law 3549/2007 sailer is clear that the Higher Education Institute (AEI / University) of the country consisted of two parallel sectors A) University and B) Technological Educational Institute.

ASPETE belongs to the university and particularly the technology sector, together with the TEI (LAW NUM. 3549 - Reforming the institutional framework for the structure and function of higher education).

The General Departments operate in accordance with the provisions of article 5, para.3 of Law 1404/1983 and are not authorized to issue degrees. The degree issued by the Departments of ASPETE qualifies its holders to teach in the corresponding discipline in secondary education; it is awarded following the completion of a course of study of eight academic semesters including the submission of a thesis and the practical work experience in the field, and is equal in status to that of TEIs (Technological Education Institutes). In order to obtain a degree equivalent to that of TEIs in the specific discipline, the graduates of ASPETE may attend a 1-Year Programme of Special Studies at ASPETE.

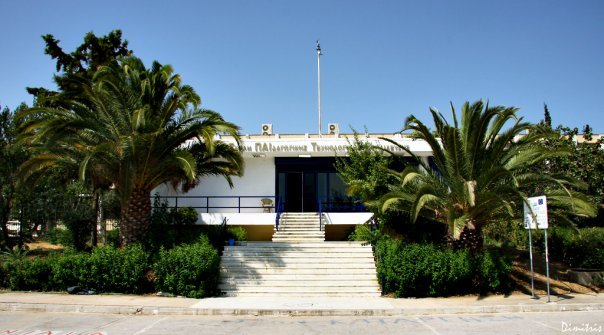
Μain Entrance of ASPETE

ASPETE also offers:

- 1-Year Pedagogical Training Program (EPPAIK), further training or specialization for in-service or prospective teachers. Those who have successfully completed the pedagogical training program are awarded a "Certificate of Pedagogical and Teaching Competence".
- 1-year Specialization Program in Counseling and Orientation (PESYP).

Apart from Athens, the above programmes are also delivered in Thessaloniki, Patras, Volos, Ioannina, Heraklion, Kozani, Rhodes, Argos, Livadeia, Sapes, Mytilene and Serres.

- Joint Postgraduate Programmes (M.A.) in cooperation with Higher Education Institutions in Greece or abroad. ASPETE is currently involved in the planning and implementation of the following joint postgraduate programmes:

a. A joint postgraduate programme, "Digital Transformation and Educational Practice", in cooperation with the National and Kapodistrian University of Athens and the University of West Attica.
b. A joint postgraduate programme, "Pedagogy through Innovative Technologies and Biomedical Approaches", in cooperation with the University of West Attica.
c. A joint postgraduate programme, "Master of Science in Educational Applications with STEM Epistemology", in cooperation with the University of Thessaly.

== History ==
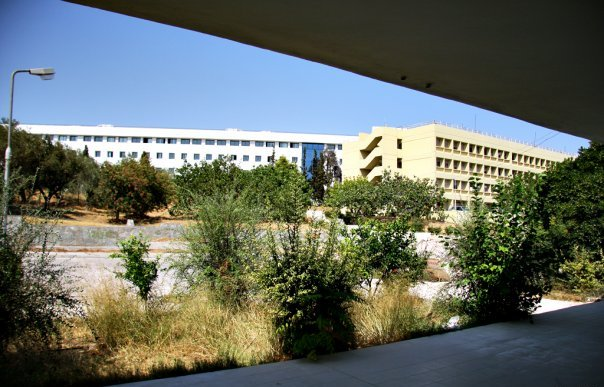
YPEPTH and ASPAITE

ASPETE's establishment in 2002 was paved by SELETE (Σ.Ε.Λ.Ε.Τ.Ε.), a Technical and Vocational Teacher Training Institute (Σχολή Εκπαιδευτικών Λειτουργών Επαγγελματικής και Τεχνικής Εκπαίδευσης), founded in 1959. SELETE's growth and mission was closely related to the economic development of Greece in the fifties. Right after World War II, the Greek government became aware of the need to place particular emphasis on the provision of vocational training in several traditional and new technical specialties. This meant developing and planning a system of Technical and Vocational Education in both, the public and private sector. Such an institutionalization entailed the systematic training of teachers of technical and vocational subjects, and it was to this end that SELETE was founded by state-law in 1959 (Law 3971/1959).

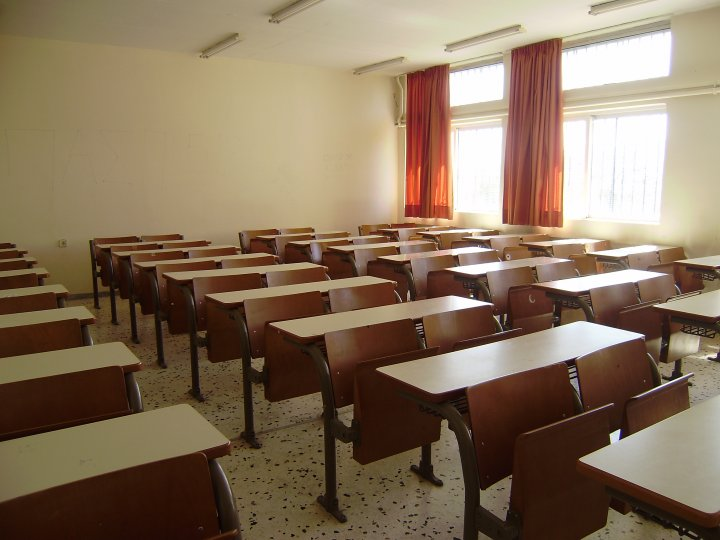
ASPAITE

When SELETE was first founded, the prevailing trend for the education and training of Technical and Vocational Teachers was that of the "add on" approach. That is, the focus was primarily on pedagogical training and only a small component of the curriculum pertained to technical or vocational subjects. Later, in the seventies, a parallel approach was adopted, that urged integrating pedagogical training with technical and vocational training. This new approach led to the establishment of two separate Schools under SELETE:

1. The Pedagogical Technical School (PATES), which maintained the tradition of the "add on" pedagogical approach and included the following Departments:

a. Department of Tertiary Education Graduates
b. Department of Secondary Technical & Vocational Education Graduates:

2. The Higher School of Pedagogical & Technical Education (ASETEM), which adopted the same approach at the level of Tertiary Education and included the following Departments:

Departments
Department of Electrical and Electronics Engineering Educators (founded 2013)
Department of Mechanical Engineering Educators (founded 2013)
Department of Civil Engineering Educators (founded 2013)
Department of Education (founded 2002)

=== Academic evaluation ===
An external evaluation of all academic departments in Greek universities will be conducted by the Hellenic Quality Assurance and Accreditation Agency (HQAA) in the following years.

== See also ==
- List of universities in Greece, a comprehensive list of public institutions offering higher education in Greece.
- List of research institutes in Greece
- Education in Greece
- Technological Educational Institute of Athens
- Technological Educational Institute of Piraeus
