= Ray Hudson (disambiguation) =

Ray Hudson (born 1955) is an English former professional football player and manager

Ray Hudson may also refer to:

- Ray Hudson (academic) (born 1948), British academic
- Ray Hudson (writer) (born 1942), American historian and poet
