= Maria Fasli =

Greek computer scientist

Acting Vice-Chancellor of the University of Essex
- In office 2024–2025
- Preceded by: Anthony Forster
- Succeeded by: Frances Bowen

Personal details
- Born: Maria Fasli
- Education: University of Essex; Alexander Technological Educational Institute of Thessaloniki; School of Pedagogical and Technological Education

Maria Fasli (born July 1973) is a Greek computer scientist. From October 2025, she will be the Pro-Vice-Chancellor (Research and Innovation) at the University of Sussex. She is a former Acting Vice-Chancellor of the University of Essex.

In 2016, she was awarded the first UNESCO Chair in Analytics and Data Science to support the development of skills and research capacity in data science, analytics and artificial intelligence across the world.

Fasli is the Director of the ESRC Business and Local Government Data Research Centre and UNESCO Chair in Analytics and Data Science. She obtained a BSc in Informatics from the Alexander Technological Educational Institute of Thessaloniki in 1996 and a PhD in Computer Science from the University of Essex in 2000, specialising in artificial intelligence. At Essex she was Executive Dean of the Faculty of Science and Health and the first Director of the Institute for Analytics and Data Science.

During her one-year tenure as Acting Vice-chancellor the University of Essex ran a voluntary severance scheme to cut over 200 jobs due to a £29m predicted 'shortfall' for the financial year 2024-25.
