= Understudy =

Stage performer who learns the lines and blocking or choreography of a regular actor

In theatre, an understudy, referred to in opera as cover or covering, is a performer who learns the lines and blocking or choreography of a regular actor, actress, or other performer in a play. Should the regular actor or actress be unable to appear on stage, the understudy takes over the part. Usually when the understudy takes over, the theater manager announces the cast change prior to the start of the performance. Coined in 1874, the term understudy has more recently generally been applied only to performers who can back up a role, but still regularly perform in another role.

== Similar tasks ==
Performers who are only committed to covering a part and do not regularly appear in the show are often referred to as standbys and alternates. Standbys are normally required to sign in and remain at the theater, although sometimes they may call in, until they are released by the production stage manager. If there is no doubt about the health of the actor being covered, or there are no hazardous stunts to perform, a standby may be released at the first intermission, if not before. At times, standbys are required to stay within a certain area around the theater (10 blocks in New York City is a common standard).

In musical theatre, the term swing is often used for a member of the company who understudies several chorus, dance or other (usually smaller) roles. If an understudy fills in for a lead role, a swing appears in the parts normally performed by the understudy.

A prompter cues an actor, usually from the wings.

== Notable examples ==
Several actors made their names in show business as understudies who took over leading actors’ roles for several performances. Examples include Anthony Hopkins for Laurence Olivier, when Olivier became ill with cancer during the run of the National Theater's The Dance of Death, 1967; Ted Neeley and Carl Anderson for Jeff Fenholt and Ben Vereen respectively during the 1971 Broadway run of Jesus Christ Superstar when Neeley and Anderson were asked to star in the 1973 film version and subsequent tours; and Edward Bennett for David Tennant as Hamlet in the RSC's 2008 production. Kerry Ellis was called to perform as Eliza Doolittle in My Fair Lady when Martine McCutcheon took ill. In the audience that day was Brian May, who was then writing his musical We Will Rock You, and he was so impressed with Ellis's performance he immediately wanted to cast her as Meat, a lead in the show.

In 1974, baritone Thomas Allen fell ill during a performance at The Proms of Carl Orff's Carmina Burana. His understudy was unable to take over – he was a medical doctor, and was attending to Allen. Patrick McCarthy, then unknown, stepped out of the audience, went backstage, and offered his services as a professional singer who knew the part. He received a standing ovation.

In 1978, Madeline Kahn departed the Broadway musical On the Twentieth Century nine weeks into its run. The New York Times reported that "she said she was withdrawing because of damage to her vocal cords." She was replaced by understudy Judy Kaye, who had been playing a small role, and the critics were invited to return. According to The New York Times, "bang, boom, overnight [Kaye] is a star." They praised her performance, Kaye won a Theatre World Award, and her theatrical career took off. She later starred in the US tour opposite Rock Hudson.

In 2002 (and also in 2003, 2005 and 2006), Sam Moran had filled in for Greg Page in the children's entertainment singing group the Wiggles during their concerts more than 150 times before stepping up as part of the official lineup in November 2006.

When Carol Haney broke her ankle while playing the role of Gladys in The Pajama Game, Shirley MacLaine assumed the role.

Arthur Stanley Jefferson, also known as Stan Laurel, was an understudy of Charlie Chaplin working for Fred Karno, a music hall impresario, before Laurel and Chaplin entered American film.

Roberto Alagna opened the 2006–07 season at La Scala on 7 December 2006 in the new production of Aida by Franco Zeffirelli. During the second performance on 10 December, Alagna, whose opening performance was considered ill-at-ease, was booed and whistled from the loggione (the least expensive seats at the very top of La Scala), and he walked off the stage. The role of Radames was taken over successfully for the rest of the performance by his understudy Antonello Palombi, who entered on stage wearing jeans and a black shirt.

During the 25th-anniversary performance of the Andrew Lloyd Webber musical The Phantom of the Opera, the titular character and Christine are played by understudies Simon Shorten and Katie Hall when they walk on a lowering walkway during the title song. In the film release of the performance, footage of the principal actors (in full costume) singing the song on the walkway was filmed in one rehearsal and added in the final cut.
