= April McMahon =

British linguist

April McMahon FRSE FBA FLSW
- Born: April Mary Scott McMahon; 30 April 1964 (age 62)
- Spouse: Robert McMahon (m. 1984)
- Children: Three

Academic background
- Education: University of Edinburgh (MA Hons, PhD)
- Thesis: Constraining lexical phonology : evidence from English vowels (1989)

Academic work
- Discipline: Linguistics
- Institutions: University of Cambridge; Selwyn College, Cambridge; University of Sheffield; University of Edinburgh; University of Aberystwyth; University of Kent; University of Manchester

April Mary Scott McMahon (born 30 April 1964) is a British academic administrator and linguist, who is Vice President for Teaching, Learning and Students at the University of Manchester.

Having taught at the University of Cambridge and the University of Sheffield, she moved into academic administration while teaching at the University of Edinburgh. She was vice-chancellor of the Aberystwyth University (2011–2016), then a member of the senior leadership team at the University of Kent before joining the University of Manchester.

== Early life and education ==
McMahon was born on 30 April 1964 in Edinburgh, Scotland. She grew up in the Scottish Borders. She studied at the University of Edinburgh, graduating with an undergraduate Master of Arts (MA Hons) degree in 1986. She remained to study for a Doctor of Philosophy (PhD) degree in phonology, which was awarded in 1989 with a doctoral thesis titled "Constraining lexical phonology: evidence from English vowels".

== Career ==
McMahon began her career at the University of Cambridge, where she was a lecturer in linguistics and a fellow of Selwyn College, Cambridge, from 1988 to 2000. From 2000 to 2004, she was Professor of English Language and Linguistics at the University of Sheffield. She then joined the University of Edinburgh, where she was Forbes Professor of English Language from 2005 to 2011. She was additionally Head of the School of Philosophy, Psychology and Language Sciences, then Head of the College of Humanities and Social Science, and finally its vice-principal (planning and research planning) from 2009 to 2011.

In 2011, McMahon joined Aberystwyth University as vice-chancellor, the chief executive and academic head of the university. Her salary at Aberystwyth was £237,000, and when she left the university, she received an extra payment of £102,000. In 2016, she joined the University of Kent as deputy vice-chancellor (education) and Professor of English Language and Linguistics. She moved once again, joining the University of Manchester as vice-president for teaching, learning and students in 2019.

=== Awards and honours ===
In 2003, McMahon was elected a Fellow of the Royal Society of Edinburgh (FRSE). In 2005, she was elected a Fellow of the British Academy (FBA), the United Kingdom's national academy for the humanities and social sciences. In 2012, she was elected a Fellow of the Learned Society of Wales (FLSW).

== Personal life ==
McMahon married Robert McMahon in 1984 and has two sons and one daughter.

== Selected works ==
Her publications as first author or co-author / editor include:

- McMahon, April M. S. (1994). Understanding Language Change. Cambridge: Cambridge University Press. ISBN 978-0521441193.
- McMahon, April (2000). Change, Chance, and Optimality. Oxford: Oxford University Press. ISBN 978-0198241249.
- McMahon, April (2000). Lexical Phonology and the History of English. Cambridge: Cambridge University Press. ISBN 978-0521472807.
- McMahon, April (2002). An Introduction to English Phonology. Edinburgh: Edinburgh University Press. ISBN 978-0748612512.
- McMahon, April; McMahon, Robert (2005). Language Classification by Numbers. Oxford: Oxford University Press. ISBN 978-0199279012.
- Aarts, Bas; McMahon, April, eds. (2006). The Handbook of English Linguistics. Malden, MA: Blackwell. ISBN 978-1405113823.
- Maguire, Warren; McMahon, April, eds. (2011). Analysing Variation in English. Cambridge: Cambridge University Press. ISBN 978-0521898669.
- McMahon, April; McMahon, Robert (2013). Evolutionary Linguistics. Cambridge: Cambridge University Press. doi:10.1017/CBO9780511989391. ISBN 978-0521814508.

Academic offices
Preceded by Noel Lloyd	Vice-Chancellor of Aberystwyth University; 2011 to 2016	Succeeded by John Grattan (acting); Elizabeth Treasure
