= Andrew Cumbers =

British economic geographer

- Born: Andrew David Cumbers

Academic background
- Education: University of Wales (BA); Durham University (PhD)
- Thesis: The restructuring of an employment system: the experience of North Sea oil in the north east of England (1991)
- Doctoral advisor: Ray Hudson
- Website: www.gla.ac.uk/schools/business/staff/andrewcumbers/

Andrew David Cumbers is a British economic geographer. He is Professor of Political Economy at the Adam Smith Business School, University of Glasgow.

He is a former editor-in-chief of the academic journal Urban Studies.

Cumbers earned his undergraduate degree from the University of Wales and completed his PhD in geography at Durham University in 1991.

He won the 2015 Gunnar Myrdal Prize (since renamed the Joan Robinson Prize) for his book, Reclaiming Public Ownership: Making Space for Economic Democracy.

== Publications ==
- MacKinnon, Danny; Cumbers, Andrew (2007). An Introduction to Economic Geography: Uneven Development, Globalisation and Place. Harlow: Prentice Hall. ISBN 9780131293168.
- Routledge, Paul; Cumbers, Andrew (2009). Global Justice Networks: Geographies of Transnational Solidarity. Perspectives on democratic practice. Manchester, UK: Manchester University Press. ISBN 9780719076855.
- MacKinnon, Danny; Cumbers, Andrew (2011). An Introduction to Economic Geography: Uneven Development, Globalisation and Place (2nd ed.). London: Pearson/Prentice Hall. ISBN 9780273727279.
- Cumbers, Andrew (2012). Reclaiming Public Ownership: Making Space for Economic Democracy. London, UK: Zed Books. ISBN 9781780320076.
- MacKinnon, Danny; Cumbers, Andrew (2018). An Introduction to Economic Geography: Globalisation, Uneven Development and Place. Abingdon, Oxon; New York, NY: Routledge. doi:10.4324/9781315684284. ISBN 9781138924505.
- Cumbers, Andrew (2020). The Case for Economic Democracy. Cambridge, UK; Medford, MA: Polity Press. ISBN 9781509533848.
