= Frank Jevons =

British academic

Frank Byron Jevons
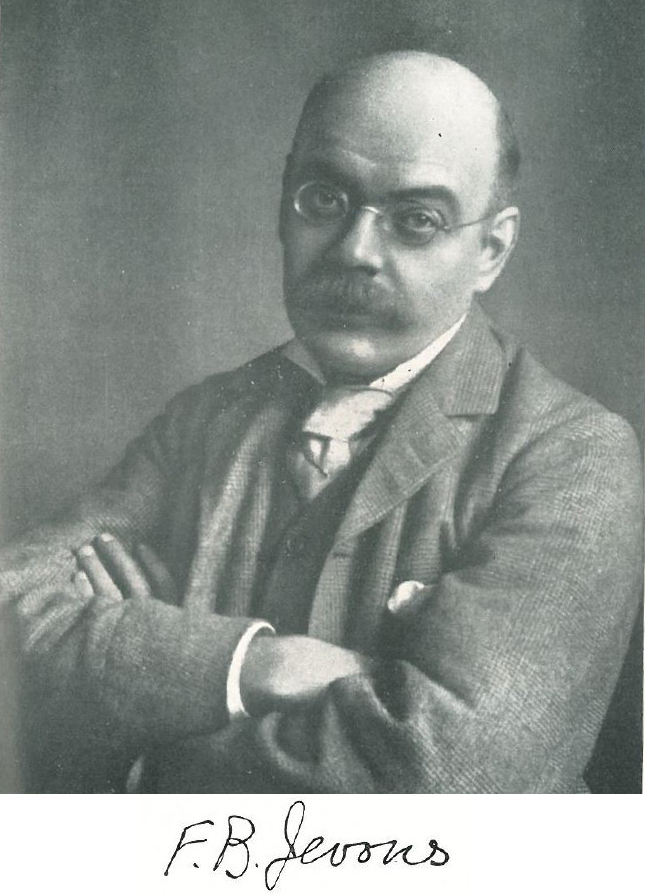

Vice-Chancellor of the University of Durham
- In office 1910–1912
- Preceded by: The Very Revd Dr George William Kitchin
- Succeeded by: Prof Sir George Hare Philipson

Master of Hatfield College, Durham
- In office 1897–1922
- Preceded by: The Right Revd Archibald Robertson
- Succeeded by: Professor Arthur Robinson

Personal details
- Born: 1858 Doncaster
- Died: 29 February 1936 Radcliffe-on-Trent
- Spouse: Ellen Louisa Cox
- Education: Wadham College, Oxford
- Profession: Academic and vice-chancellor

Frank Byron Jevons (1858–29 February 1936) was a polymath, academic and administrator of Durham University.

== Early life ==
He was educated at Nottingham High School and Wadham College, Oxford and appointed a lecturer in Classics at Durham in 1882.

== Career ==
He was the first Censor of St Cuthbert's Society from 1892 until 1897, a role he performed with "skill and humanity". In 1897 he was appointed as Principal of Bishop Hatfield's Hall (retitled master in 1919 when it became Hatfield College), where he remained until 1922. He was the first principal not to be seen ordained clergyman. He also served as treasurer of the university from 1898 to 1902, as sub-warden from 1902 to 1909, as vice-chancellor of the university between 1910 and 1912 and pro vice-chancellor between 1912 and 1914 and 1916 to 1921.

He received an honorary DLitt from Durham University in 1895. He was Professor of Philosophy between 1910 and 1930 and presided at the inaugural meeting of the World Congress of Philosophy in 1923. One of the last Victorian polymaths, in the twenty years before and after 1900, he gave himself successively to the study of classics, philosophy, sociology, history, anthropology, and comparative religion.

A portrait hangs in the refectory of Hatfield College.

== Social and national issues ==
He was concerned with social and national issues, especially the education of the working classes and of women.

== Major writings ==
He was author of eighteen scholarly texts some of which, for example A History of Greek Literature: From the Earliest Period to the Death of Demosthenes (1886), An Introduction to the Study of Comparative Religion (1908), and Comparative Religion (Cambridge Manual of Science and Literature) (1913) remain in print.

He also wrote on other fields in which subsequent technical advances have been radical and rapid, such as evolution. Such works understandably are no longer commonly in print, but they remain of interest for their clarity, logic, and sound representation of the perspective of his day.

Other writings available online include:

- A Manual of Greek Antiquities (as co-author of Percy Gardner)
- An Introduction to the History of Religion
- Philosophy: What is It?
- The idea of God in early religions

=== List of works ===
Jevons wrote, co-authored, or translated the following books (some titles may be duplicates):

- Jevons, Frank Byron (2011). Comparative Religion. Cambridge University Press. ISBN 978-1107401754.
- Jevons, Frank Byron. Graeco-Italian Magic.
- Jevons, Frank Byron. Magic.
- Jevons, Frank Byron (1900). Evolution. Methuen.
- Jevons, Frank Byron (1886). A History of Greek Literature: From the Earliest Period to the Death of Demosthenes. New York, C. Scribner's sons.
- Jevons, Frank Byron. Masks and Acting. ISBN 978-1-113-28297-2.
- Jevons, Frank Byron. Personality. ISBN 978-1-112-31066-9.
- Plutarch (1892) [c.100]. Jevons, Frank Byron (ed.). Plutarch's Romane Questions. based on 1603 translation by Philemon Holland. David Nutt in The Strand. ISBN 978-1-117-10776-9.
- Jevons, Frank Byron (1908). An Introduction to the Study of Comparative Religion. The Macmillan Company. ISBN 9781178627886.
- Jevons, Frank Byron. Prehistoric Antiquities of the Aryan Peoples: A Manual Of Comparative Philology And The Earliest Culture Being The Sprachvergleichung Und Urgeschichte Of Dr. O. Schrader. ISBN 978-0-548-09482-2.
- Jevons, Frank Byron. Religion in Evolution. ISBN 978-1-172-27073-6.
- Jevons, Frank Byron. The Development of the Athenian Democracy. ISBN 978-1-241-40147-4.
- Jevons, Frank Byron. The Evolution of the Religious Consciousness.
- Jevons, Frank Byron. The Makers of Hellas: A Critical Inquiry Into the Philosophy and Religion of Ancient Greece. ISBN 978-1-148-28157-5.

Academic offices
Preceded by The Very Revd George William Kitchin	Warden & Vice-Chancellor of the University of Durham; 1910 - 1912	Succeeded by Prof Sir George Hare Philipson
