= Ans van Kemenade =

Linguist

Ans van Kemenade (born 1954 in Eindhoven) is a Dutch professor of English linguistics at the Radboud University Nijmegen specializing in the history of the English language.

== Biography ==
Van Kemenade studied English and linguistics at Utrecht University, and received her doctorate there in 1987 with a thesis titled Syntactic Case and Morphological Case in the History of English. Following positions at Leiden University and the Vrije Universiteit Amsterdam she was appointed professor and chair of English linguistics at the Radboud University Nijmegen in 1999.

Van Kemenade has been the recipient of numerous awards and honours. In 2015 she was appointed as a member of the Permanent Committee for Large Scale Research Infrastructures advising the Dutch Research Council. In 2017 she was the recipient of a festschrift, Word Order Change in Acquisition and Language Contact, edited by Bettelou Los and Pieter de Haan. She was elected as a member of the Academia Europaea in 2018. In 2020 she was made a Knight of the Order of the Lion of the Netherlands.

== Research ==
Van Kemenade works on language variation and change, particularly in the histories of English and Dutch. A major focus of her recent work has been the interplay of syntax and information structure in word order change.

== Selected publications ==
- van Kemenade, Ans. 1987. Syntactic Case and Morphological Case in the History of English. Dordrecht: Foris. ISBN 9783110133103
- Hulk, Aafke, and Ans van Kemenade. 1995. Verb second, pro-drop, functional projections and language change. In Adrian Battye & Ian Roberts (eds.), Clause structure and language change, 227–256. Oxford: Oxford University Press.
- van Kemenade, Ans, and Nigel Vincent (eds.). 1997. Parameters of Morphosyntactic Change. Cambridge: Cambridge University Press. ISBN 9780521586436
- van Kemenade, Ans. 1997. V2 and embedded topicalisation in Old and Middle English. In van Kemenade & Vincent (eds.), 326–352.
- Fischer, Olga, Ans van Kemenade, Willem Koopman and Wim van der Wurff. 2000. The syntax of early English. Cambridge: Cambridge University Press. ISBN 9780511612312
- van Kemenade, Ans. 2000. Jespersen's Cycle revisited: formal properties of grammaticalization. In Susan Pintzuk, George Tsoulas & Anthony Warner (eds.), Diachronic syntax: models and mechanisms, 51–74. Oxford: Oxford University Press.
- van Kemenade, Ans, and Bettelou Los (eds.). 2006. The handbook of the history of English. Oxford: Wiley-Blackwell. ISBN 9780631233442
- van Kemenade, Ans, and Bettelou Los. 2006. Discourse adverbs and clausal syntax on Old and Middle English. In van Kemenade & Los (eds.), 224–248.
