= Robert Hawkey =

British triple jumper

Personal information
- Nationality: British (English)
- Born: 19 March 1915 Chester-le-Street, England
- Died: 26 January 1976 (aged 60) New Zealand

Sport
- Sport: Athletics
- Event: triple jump/long jump
- Club: Darlington Harriers

Robert Hawkey (19 March 1915 – 26 January 1976) was a British athlete who competed at the 1948 Summer Olympics.

== Biography ==
Hawkey was educated at Ryhope Grammar School in County Durham before joining the Metropolitan Police in London. He competed for the Met at various athletic meetings, which included setting a Welsh all-comers long jump record in Newport during 1937, when he jumped 6.78. In 1939, he won the Northumberland and Durham long jump title and joined the Durham County Constabulary, where he competed at the 1939 National Police Championship.

After World War II, Hawkey won the 1947 Northern triple jump title and competed for Darlington Harriers.

Hawkey finished third behind Denis Watts in the triple jump event at the 1947 AAA Championships.

Hawkey represented the Great Britain team at the 1948 Olympic Games in London, in the men's triple jump competition.
