= Anthony Forster (political scientist) =

British political scientist and British Army officer

Anthony Forster FRSA FAcSS FHEA
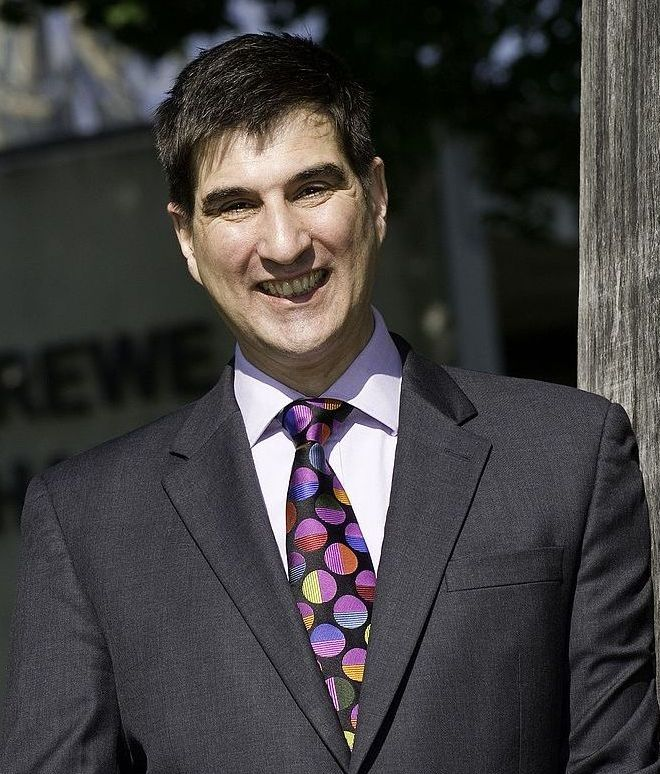
- Forster in 2012

Vice-Chancellor of the University of Essex
- In office 2012–2024
- Preceded by: Colin Riordan
- Succeeded by: Maria Fasli (acting)

Personal details
- Born: Anthony William Forster; 19 May 1964 (age 62) Chiseldon, Wiltshire, England
- Education: University of Hull; St Antony's College, Oxford; St Hugh's College, Oxford; University of Nottingham
- Salary: £309,941 (2021–22)

Military service
- Allegiance: United Kingdom
- Branch/service: British Army
- Years of service: 1985–1991
- Rank: Captain
- Unit: Royal Corps of Transport

Anthony William Forster, FRSA FAcSS FHEA (born 19 May 1964) is a British political scientist and former British Army officer. He is a former vice-chancellor of the University of Essex and was previously deputy vice-chancellor of Durham University.

== Early life and education ==
Forster was born on 19 May 1964 in Chiseldon, Wiltshire, England. Attended Denstone College in Staffordshire 1977 to 1982. Sponsored by the military in the form of an undergraduate cadetship, he graduated from the University of Hull in 1985 with a BA (first class) in politics.

After completing six years of military service, he studied Politics (European Politics and Society) at St Antony's College, Oxford, from 1991, obtaining his MPhil in 1993. He remained at Oxford to undertake further research in European politics, and completed his DPhil in 1996 at St Hugh's College, Oxford.

== Career ==
=== Military service ===
From 1985 to 1991 Forster served as an officer in the British Army. On 2 September 1983, he was commissioned into the Royal Corps of Transport as a second lieutenant (on probation) (Undergraduate Cadetship). After graduating he began his full-time military career as a second lieutenant (on probation) in July 1985, with the service number of 517900. His commission was confirmed and he was promoted to lieutenant on 7 July 1985 with seniority from 9 April 1985. He was promoted to captain on 9 April 1989 but left the British Army on 1 May 1991, then being appointed to the reserve of officers.

His military service came at the end of the Cold War, and he completed several postings to West Germany. In 1990 he was deployed to Namibia as a British military adviser to the government of the newly independent nation.

=== Academic career ===
Forster began his academic career while a postgraduate student at the University of Oxford. He was a lecturer at St Hilda's College, Oxford, from 1985 to 1986. He later held positions at the University of Nottingham (1996–2000), King's College, London (2000–2002) and the University of Bristol (2002–2006). From 2006 he worked at Durham University and from 2011 held the positions of deputy vice-chancellor and honorary professor of politics.

In 2012 Forster was appointed as the vice-chancellor of the University of Essex, where he has presided over reforms that seek to emphasize the university's commitment to education and teaching, as well as to research, alongside a strategic goal of increasing student numbers by 50 percent by 2019. He was criticized in 2014 by author and academic Marina Warner, after she resigned from the university, who argued that decision-making power at Essex had been handed to administrators at the expense of academics.

In August 2023, Forster announced his intention to retire in July 2024. In November 2024, shortly after he stepped down, the University announced they would cut 200 jobs due to a £29 million 'shortfall', blaming government decisions on funding an internationals students.

=== D-Notice system review ===
In 2014 Jon Thompson, Permanent Secretary of the Ministry of Defence, asked Forster to chair an independent review to examine the efficacy of the Defence, Press and Broadcasting Advisory Committee and DA-Notice system. The review was completed in 2015.

=== Other appointments ===
Forster is an Executive Board Member for the Young Universities for the Future of Europe Alliance (2019-) and the Joint Information Systems Committee (JISC) (2020-). Forster has been a board member and director at the Leadership Foundation for Higher Education (2008-2014); a board member and trustee for animal welfare charity Blue Cross (2012–17); a member of the Higher Education Funding Council for England Teaching and Student Opportunity Strategic Advisory Committee (2015–18); a board member of the Higher Education Academy (2016–18); a member of South East Local Enterprise Partnership's strategic board (2016–19); and a board member of the Equality Challenge Unit (2017–18).

== Honours ==
In 2009, Forster was elected a Fellow of the Academy of Social Sciences (FAcSS).

== Selected works ==
- (2007) Out of Step: The Case for Change in British Armed Forces, London: Demos (with Tim Edmunds).
- (2006) Armed Forces and Society in Europe, Basingstoke: Palgrave Macmillan.
- (2004) Reshaping Defence Diplomacy: New Roles for Military Cooperation and Assistance, Adelphi Paper 365, Oxford: Oxford University Press (with Andrew Cottey).
- (2002) Euroscepticism in Contemporary British Politics: Opposition to Europe in the British Conservative and Labour Parties since 1945, London: Routledge.
- (2001) The Making of Britain's European Foreign Policy, Essex: Longman Press (with Alasdair Blair).
- (1999) Britain and the Maastricht Negotiations, London: Macmillan/St Antony's and New York: St Martin's Press.

Academic offices
Preceded by	Deputy Vice-Chancellor of Durham University; 2011 to 2012	Succeeded by Ray Hudson
Preceded by Colin Riordan	Vice-Chancellor of the University of Essex; 2012 to 2024	Succeeded by Maria Fasli (acting)
