= Forbes Chair of English Language =

The Forbes Chair of English Language is a chair at the University of Edinburgh. It is one of a number of chairs founded in the 1940s following a bequest by East India merchant and Edinburgh alumnus Daniel Mackintosh Forbes. Its original title was the Forbes Chair of English Language and General Linguistics, but with the creation of a separate chair of general linguistics in the 1960s the latter part of the title was dropped, incumbent Angus McIntosh continuing in the role.

== List of Forbes Professors of English Language ==
- 1948–1979: Angus McIntosh
- 1979–1988: James Peter Thorne
- 1990–2004: Charles Jones
- 2005–2011: April McMahon
- 2013–present: Bettelou Los
