= Bettelou Los =

Linguist and philologist

Bettelou Los is a linguist and philologist specializing in the history of the English language. Since 2013 she has held the Forbes Chair of English Language at the University of Edinburgh.

== Academic career ==
Los received her MA from the University of Amsterdam in 1986. After spending some time working as a translator, she obtained her PhD in 2000 from the Vrije Universiteit Amsterdam; her dissertation focused on infinitives in Old and Middle English. From 2004 she held positions as lecturer first at the Vrije Universiteit and then at Radboud University Nijmegen, where she was promoted to senior lecturer in 2008, before moving to Edinburgh in 2013.

== Research ==
Los is known for her work on language change in the history of English and other early Germanic languages, particularly in the domain of syntax. Information structure and its interaction with syntactic change has played an important role in her more recent work. Her book on the rise of the to-infinitive in English is the standard reference on that subject, and she has also carried out important work on discourse adverbs, particles, and verb-second, among other topics. She is also the author of a textbook on English historical syntax and co-editor of the handbook on the history of the English language along with Ans van Kemenade.

== Selected publications ==
- Los, Bettelou. 2005. The rise of the to-infinitive. Oxford: Oxford University Press. ISBN 9780199274765
- van Kemenade, Ans and Bettelou Los (eds.). 2006. The handbook of the history of English. Oxford: Blackwell. ISBN 9780631233442
- van Kemenade, Ans and Bettelou Los. 2006. Discourse adverbs and clausal syntax in Old and Middle English. In van Kemenade and Los (eds.), 224–248.
- Los, Bettelou. 2009. The consequences of the loss of verb-second in English: information structure and syntax in interaction. English Language and Linguistics 13 (1), 97-125.
- Los, Bettelou, and Gea Dreschler. 2012. The loss of local anchoring: from adverbial local anchors to permissive subjects. In Elizabeth C. Traugott and Terttu Nevalainen (eds.), The Oxford handbook of the history of English. Oxford: Oxford University Press.
- Los, Bettelou, Corrien Blom, Geert Booij, Marion Elenbaas and Ans van Kemenade. 2012. Morphosyntactic change: a comparative study of particles and prefixes. Cambridge: Cambridge University Press. ISBN 9781107012639
- Meurman-Solin, Anneli, Maria José López-Couso and Bettelou Los (eds.). 2012. Information Structure and Syntactic Change in the History of English. Cambridge: Cambridge University Press. ISBN 9780199860210
- Los, Bettelou. 2012. The Loss of Verb-Second and the Switch from Bounded to Unbounded Systems. In Meurman-Solin et al. (eds.), 21–46.
- Los, Bettelou. 2015. A historical syntax of English. Edinburgh: Edinburgh University Press. ISBN 9780748641437
