= Angus McIntosh (linguist) =

British linguist and academic (1914–2005)

Angus McIntosh FRSE FBA
- Born: 10 January 1914; Sunderland, England
- Died: 25 October 2005 (aged 91)
- Citizenship: United Kingdom
- Spouses: Barbara (m. 1939; died 1988) Karina (m. 1988)
- Children: 3 children, 3 step-children
- Awards: Sir Israel Gollancz Prize (1989)

Academic work
- Discipline: Linguistics
- Sub-discipline: Philology; historical linguistics; Middle English; Scots
- Institutions: University College, Swansea; University of Oxford; Christ Church, Oxford; University of Edinburgh; University of Glasgow

Angus Mcintosh, FRSE, FBA (10 January 1914 – 25 October 2005) was a British linguist and academic, specialising in historical linguistics.

McIntosh was born in 1914 near Sunderland, England, to Scottish parents. He was educated locally, at Ryhope Grammar School, and studied English at Oriel College, Oxford. He then studied comparative philology at Merton College, Oxford, and was a Commonwealth Fellow at Harvard University. He served in the British Army during the Second World War, including working in intelligence at Bletchley Park.

Having taught at University College, Swansea, before the war, he moved to the University of Oxford after being demobbed. Only two years later, in 1948, he moved to the University of Edinburgh as its first Forbes Professor of English Language and General Linguistics. He remained at Edinburgh until retirement, and then served as director of the Middle English Dialect Atlas Project from 1979 to 1986. He was an honorary research fellow at the University of Glasgow until his death in 2005.

== Early life and education ==
McIntosh was born on 10 January 1914 near Sunderland, England, to Scottish parents. He was educated at Ryhope Grammar School, a state grammar school in Ryhope, County Durham. Having received a state scholarship, he studied English language and literature at Oriel College, Oxford. He graduated with a first class honours Bachelor of Arts (BA) degree in 1934: as per tradition, his BA was promoted to a Master of Arts (MA Oxon) degree in 1938. Having received a Harmsworth Scholarship, he studied for a diploma in comparative philology at Merton College, Oxford, which he completed in 1936. During this period, he played racket sports with J. R. R. Tolkien resulting in an ankle injury to Tolkien. Tolkien began sketching ideas for The Hobbit and The Lord of the Rings while recuperating. Then, from 1936 to 1938, he studied at Harvard University as a Commonwealth Fellow. He graduated from Harvard with a Master of Arts (AM) degree in 1937.

=== Military service ===
In 1940, following the outbreak of the Second World War, McIntosh joined the Tank Corps as a trooper. On 20 January 1941, he was commissioned as a second lieutenant in the Intelligence Corps. He was promoted to war substantive lieutenant and temporary captain on 1 June 1941. As an intelligence officer, he worked at Bletchley Park's Station X. With his linguistic training, he was involved in decrypting German military communication and helping crack Enigma codes. He ended the war with the rank of major.

For his military service, McIntosh was awarded the France and Germany Star, Defence Medal, and the War Medal 1939–1945.

== Academic career ==
McIntosh began his academic career in 1938, shortly before the outbreak of the Second World War, as a lecturer in the Department of English, University College, Swansea. In 1946, after a break in his career due to military service, he returned to the University of Oxford as a university lecturer in Mediæval English (Old and Middle English). He additionally held a lectureship at Christ Church, Oxford for the 1946–47 academic year, and was a tutor at Jesus College, Oxford and Wadham College, Oxford. He was elected a Student (i.e. Fellow) of Christ Church in 1947.

Rather than stay at Oxford, however, McIntosh moved to the University of Edinburgh as its first Forbes Professor of English Language and General Linguistics in 1948. His research interests included philology and historical linguistics relating to both Middle English and Scots. He stepped down from the renamed Forbes Chair of English Language in 1979. He then served as director of the Middle English Dialect Atlas Project between 1979 and 1986, which resulted in the publication of A Linguistic Atlas of Late Medieval English (1986). In retirement, he was Professor Emeritus at Edinburgh and an honorary research fellow at the University of Glasgow.

== Personal life ==
In 1939, McIntosh married Barbara, an American and daughter of William Seaman Bainbridge. Together they had three children: two sons and one daughter. She died in 1988, and he remarried the same year to Karina, the widow of an Oxford scholar. This second marriage brought three stepchildren: a daughter and two sons.

McIntosh died on 25 October 2005, aged 91. He was suffering from kidney failure and renovascular disease. After a funeral service held at Canongate Kirk, he was buried in Grange Cemetery in Edinburgh.

== Honours ==
In 1978, McIntosh was elected a Fellow of the Royal Society of Edinburgh (FRSE), Scotland's national academy of science and letters. In 1989, he was elected a Fellow of the British Academy (FBA), the United Kingdom's national academy for social sciences and the humanities. Also in 1989, the British Academy awarded him the Sir Israel Gollancz Prize, an award given to scholars of early English language and literature, English philology, or the history of English language.

Upon retirement from the University of Edinburgh, McIntosh had the unusual distinction of being presented with two Festschrifts. One was titled So Meny People, Longages and Tonges: Philological Essays in Scots and Mediaeval English presented to Angus McIntosh (1981). The other was titled Language Form and Linguistic Variation: papers dedicated to Angus McIntosh. The Angus McIntosh Centre for Historical Linguistics at the University of Edinburgh is named in his honour.

== Selected works ==
- Mcintosh, Angus (1949). Wulfstan's Prose. London: Geoffrey Cumberlege.
- McIntosh, Angus (1952). An Introduction to a Survey of Scottish Dialects. Edinburgh: University of Edinburgh Press.
- Halliday, M. A. K.; McIntosh, Angus; Strevens, Peter (1964). The Linguistic Sciences and Language Teaching. London: Longmans, Green and Co., Ltd.
- McIntosh, Angus; Halliday, M. A. K. (1966). Patterns of language: papers in general, descriptive and applied linguistics. London: Longmans, Green and Co. Ltd.
- McIntosh, Angus; Samuels, M. L.; Benskin, Michael (1986). A Linguistic Atlas of Late Mediaeval English. Aberdeen: Aberdeen University Press.
