= Karen O'Brien =

British academic administrator

Karen O'Brien FRSA

25th Vice Chancellor and Warden of Durham University
- Incumbent
- Assumed office January 2022
- Preceded by: Stuart Corbridge

Personal details
- Education: University College, Oxford (MA); St Cross College, Oxford (DPhil)

Karen Elisabeth O'Brien is a British academic administrator and literary scholar, specialising in the Enlightenment and eighteenth-century European literature. Since 2022, she has served as Vice-Chancellor and Warden of Durham University (being the first woman to hold this office).

Elected a Fellow of University College, Oxford in 2016, O'Brien was Professor of English Literature and Head of the Humanities Division at the University of Oxford until 2021.

Prior to her time at Oxford, O'Brien served as a Pro-Vice-Chancellor at the University of Birmingham and then Vice-Principal for Education at King's College London. O'Brien's scholarly work focuses on the British, American and French Enlightenments, and on British literature more generally between 1660 and 1820. She took her doctoral degree (DPhil) at St Cross College in 1986 with a thesis on English literature, after having completed her undergraduate studies at University College, Oxford, graduating MA. She has been elected a Fellow of the Royal Society of Arts, and an Honorary Fellow of Peterhouse, Cambridge.

== Selected works ==
- O'Brien, Karen (1997). Narratives of Enlightenment: cosmopolitan history from Voltaire to Gibbon. Cambridge: Cambridge University Press. ISBN 978-0521465335.
- O'Brien, Karen (2009). Women and Enlightenment in eighteenth-century Britain. Cambridge: Cambridge University Press. ISBN 978-0521773492.
- Garside, Peter; O'Brien, Karen, eds. (2015). English and British fiction: 1750-1820. Oxford: Oxford University Press. ISBN 9780199574803.
- O'Brien, Karen; Young, Brian, eds. (2018). The Cambridge Companion to Edward Gibbon. Cambridge: Cambridge University Press. ISBN 978-1107035119.

== See also ==
- Vice-Chancellors and Wardens of Durham University

Academic offices
Preceded by Stuart Corbridge	Vice-Chancellor and Warden of Durham University; 2022–present	Incumbent
