= George Hare Philipson =

English physician (1836–1918)

Sir George Hare Philipson MD, FRCP, Hon DCL, Hon LLD
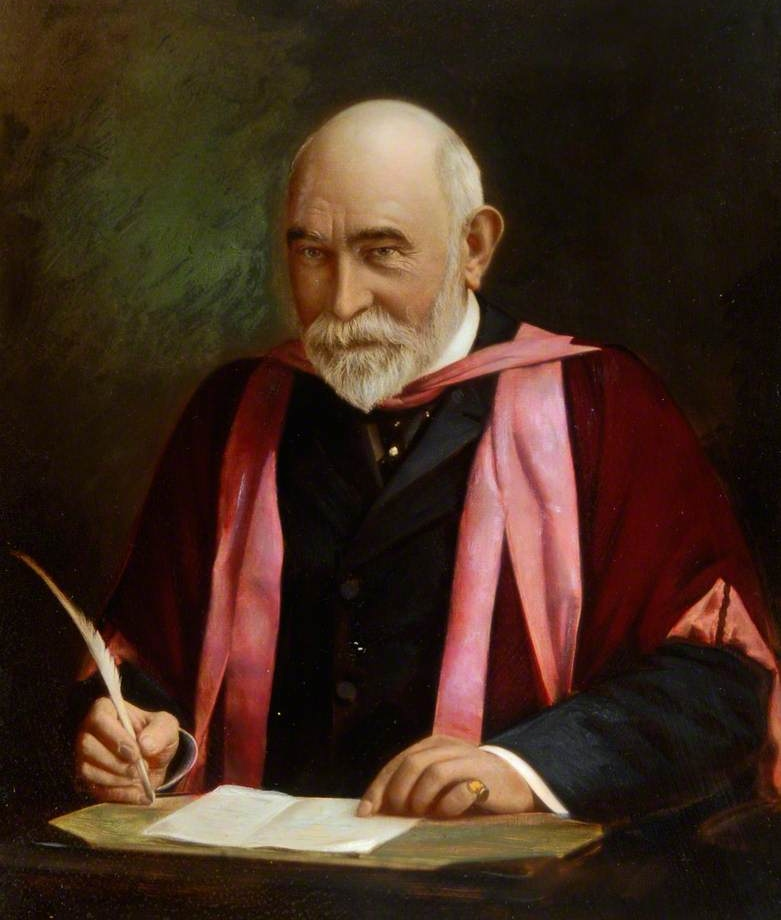
- George Hare Philipson in 1917

Vice-Chancellor of the University of Durham
- In office 1910–1912
- Preceded by: Prof Frank Byron Jevons
- Succeeded by: The Very Revd Prof Henry Gee

President of the British Medical Association
- In office 1893–1893
- Preceded by: Dr John Croft
- Succeeded by: Dr Andrew Carrick

Personal details
- Born: 18 May 1836 Newcastle upon Tyne
- Died: 24 January 1918 (aged 81) Newcastle upon Tyne
- Education: University College London, Gonville and Caius College, Cambridge
- Profession: Academic and Vice-Chancellor

Sir George Hare Philipson, M.D., F.R.C.P. (18 May 1836 – 24 January 1918) was an English physician knighted in 1900.

He was educated at University College, London and Caius College, Cambridge. From 1876 until his death in 1918 he was professor of Medicine at Durham University. He was elected the President of the British Medical Association for the year 1893.

Academic offices
Preceded by Prof Frank Byron Jevons	Vice Chancellor & Warden of the University of Durham; 1910–1912	Succeeded by The Very Revd Henry Gee
