= Elizabeth Treasure =

British dentist

Elizabeth Tulip Treasure (born January 1958) is a former consultant dentist and professor of dentistry who served as the Vice-Chancellor of Aberystwyth University in Wales from 2017 to 2023.

== Biography ==
Treasure studied dentistry at the University of Birmingham where she was awarded BDS and PhD degrees. From 1980 to 1990, she worked in the National Health Service in several clinical roles. She then moved to New Zealand where she worked as a public health dentist and as a lecturer and senior lecturer at the University of Otago.

In 1995, Treasure moved back to the UK where she was appointed Senior Lecturer and Consultant in Dental Public Health at the University of Wales College of Medicine, where in 2000 she became a professor. In 2006 she was appointed Dean and General Manager of the Dental School and of the Cardiff University Dental Hospital.

Treasure's research interests include clinical effectiveness, epidemiology and clinical trials. She chaired a review of the dental workforce in Wales and was scientific adviser to the Department of Health's dental division.

In 2010, Treasure was appointed Deputy Vice-Chancellor of Cardiff University, the first woman to hold this position. She was appointed Vice-Chancellor of Aberystwyth University in December 2016 and took up the post in April 2017.

In 2017, Treasure was elected a Fellow of the Learned Society of Wales.

In May 2023, Treasure announced she would step down from her position at Aberystwyth University in December 2023, citing health reasons.

== Memberships and appointments ==
- Member of Cardiff and Vale University Health Board
- Finance Committee of UCAS
- Health and Safety Committee of the Universities and Colleges Employers' Association (UCEA)
- British Association for the Study of Community Dentistry (President 2014–15)
- Council Member of Llandaff Cathedral School, Cardiff

== Awards ==
- John Tomes Medal of the British Dental Association (2006)
- FDSRCPS (special) (2011)

Academic offices
Preceded by April McMahon	Vice-Chancellor of Aberystwyth University; 2017–2023	Succeeded by Jon Timmis
