= Derman Christopherson =

British engineering science academic

Sir Derman Guy Christopherson OBE FRS FREng (6 September 1915 – 7 November 2000) was a British engineering science academic.

== Early life and education ==
Christopherson was born the son of a clergyman, Derman Christopherson (the vicar of Plumstead in southeast London), and Edith Frances Christopherson. Soon afterwards, the Christopherson family moved to Porlock in Devon, where his father was vicar of Clovelly. As a boy, Christopherson suffered from asthma. He was educated privately until, at age 14, he was sent to Sherborne School in Dorset.

He gained a scholarship at University College, Oxford, initially to read Mathematics. Later, in 1937, he achieved a first class degree in Engineering Science. The following year he went to Harvard University in the United States as a Henry Fellow, gaining an SM master's degree in 1938.

He returned to Oxford University as a research assistant to Richard Southwell, working on numerical methods for applied mechanics. He contributed to Southwell's relaxation method.

Christopherson was the first to apply the method in the solution of field differential equations, which later became the most important application. He gained his DPhil in 1941.

== War service ==
In 1941, during World War II, Christopherson was appointed as a Scientific Officer in the Ministry of Home Security, working in the research and experimental department with Sir Reginald Stradling. His work involved investigating the effects of explosives on buildings, shelters, and firefighting. He worked with Solly (later Lord) Zuckerman and Hugh (later Sir Hugh) Cairns on researching helmet designs. He was also with Barnes Wallis and his team during the war.

== Academic career ==
Most of Christopherson's research was conducted at the University of Oxford (1937–41), the University of Cambridge (1945–49), and the University of Leeds (1949–55). He contributed to lubrication research especially. He was a lecturer in engineering at Cambridge. Christopherson was then appointed Professor of Mechanical Engineering at Leeds and became the head of the department in 1949. He left Leeds to become Professor of Applied Science with special reference to Engineering at Imperial College, London until 1960.

Christopherson was Vice-Chancellor and Warden of the University of Durham (1960–1979) and then Master of Magdalene College, Cambridge (1978–1985). In 1983 he became the second Chairman of the Standing Committee on Structural Safety, succeeding Lord Penney. He served as such until 1988.

== Honours ==
Christopherson was elected a Fellow of the Royal Society (FRS) in 1960. He was also a Fellow of the Royal Academy of Engineering.

== Marriage and children ==
Christopherson married Frances Edith Tearle in 1940; the couple had five children. Their son, Peter Christopherson (1955-2010), was a musician, video director and designer. Lady Christopherson predeceased her husband in 1988.

== Death ==
Christopherson died on 7 November 2000, aged 85. He was interred with his wife at the Parish of the Ascension Burial Ground, Cambridge.

== Selected publications ==
- On being a technologist. London: S.C.M. Press, 1959.
- The University at Work. London: S.C.M. Press, 1973. Published for the University Teachers' Group; ISBN 0-334-01734-3.

Academic offices
Preceded by Dr Charles Ion Carr Bosanquet	Vice-Chancellor & Warden of the University of Durham; 1960–1979	Succeeded by Prof. Sir Frederick Holliday
Preceded by Walter Hamilton	Master of Magdalene College, Cambridge; 1978–1985	Succeeded by Sir David Calcutt
