= Fred Holliday (marine biologist) =

British marine biologist, academic, academic administrator and businessman

Sir Fred Holliday CBE DL FRSE

Vice-Chancellor and Warden of Durham University
- In office 1980–1990
- Preceded by: Sir Derman Christopherson
- Succeeded by: Evelyn Ebsworth

Acting Principal of the University of Stirling
- In office 1973–1975
- Preceded by: Tom Cottrell
- Succeeded by: Sir William Cramond

Personal details
- Born: Frederick George Thomas Holliday; 22 September 1935 Rubery, Bromsgrove, Worcestershire, England
- Died: 5 September 2016 (aged 80) Aberdeen, Scotland
- Citizenship: United Kingdom
- Education: Bromsgrove County High School; University of Sheffield

Sir Frederick George Thomas Holliday, CBE, DL, FRSE (22 September 1935 – 5 September 2016) was a British marine biologist, academic, academic administrator, and businessman. He was Acting Principal of the University of Stirling from 1973 to 1975, Vice-Chancellor and Warden of Durham University from 1980 to 1990, and Chair of Northumbrian Water from 1993 to 2006.

== Early life and education ==
Holliday was born on 22 September 1935 on a council estate in Rubery, Bromsgrove, Worcestershire, England. His father, Alfred Holliday, was a technologist at a glass factory that was involved in developing bulletproof glass for the British military during World War II, and his mother, Margaret Holliday, was a cook. He was educated at Bromsgrove County High School, then a grammar school in Bromsgrove. His interest in science was developed as a child: he would "prick the fingers of his sister, Myrtle, and examine her blood under his microscope kit", and his mother once found a "decomposing snake under his bed".

A teacher at Holliday's school encouraged him to study biology at university rather than English literature which he had also been considering. He had been offered a place at the University of Cambridge but turned it down. He instead attended the University of Sheffield where he could study under Sir Hans Krebs, a Nobel Prize-winner. He graduated in 1956 with a first class Bachelor of Science (BSc) degree in zoology.

== Career ==
=== Early career ===
Following his undergraduate degree, Holliday undertook his National Service between 1956 and 1958. This was spent on defence vessels and at the Marine Research Laboratory in Aberdeen, Scotland. In 1958, he joined the civil service having been appointed a scientific officer at the Marine Research Laboratory. He worked there for the next three years before moving into academia.

=== Academic career ===
In 1961, Holliday joined the University of Aberdeen as a lecturer in zoology. In 1967, he joined the newly created University of Stirling as Professor of Biology. He served as Deputy Principal of the university in 1972, and was its Acting Principal from 1973 to 1975; this made him the youngest head of a British university. In 1975, he returned to the University of Aberdeen where he had been appointed Professor of Zoology. However, he soon left Aberdeen for an academic administration position as "the executive bug had taken hold".

In 1980, Holliday became Vice-Chancellor and Warden of Durham University. During his time as its head, he expanded Durham University through the building of the Queen's Campus in Stockton-on-Tees; this would later expand further and now consists of two colleges (John Snow College, Durham and Stephenson College, Durham). In 1990, he stepped down and retired from academia, being succeeded as Vice-Chancellor and Warden by Evelyn Ebsworth.

=== Later career ===
Having retired from academia in 1990, Holliday joined the Joint Nature Conservation Committee as its chairman; this is a public body that advises the UK Government on nature conservation. He resigned from the committee in 1991, in protest over the government's "failure to consult the committee before introducing the Natural Heritage (Scotland) Act". This act created the Scottish Natural Heritage but also allowed land-owners to appeal against the creation of a Site of Special Scientific Interest.

Holliday joined the board of directors of Northumbrian Water in 1991. He was elected its chairman in 1993. During his leadership, he expanded company's coverage until it provided water for the North East of England. It was also a period of upheaval with the company being bought by Lyonnaise des Eaux, a French company which later merged with another to become Suez; Northumbrian Water was sold in 2003, becoming once more British owned. He stepped down as chairman in 2006.

He was President of the Freshwater Biological Association from 1995 to 2002 when they were renegotiating their relationship with the Natural Environment Research Council.

== Later life ==
At the age of 75, Holliday developed Non-Hodgkin lymphoma, a type of blood cancer. He spent the rest of his life in retirement; growing vegetables, reading a large number of books (including Gibbon's lengthy The History of the Decline and Fall of the Roman Empire), and rediscovering his interest in histology (including analysing samples of his blood). He had developed cancer twice in his last few years.

Holliday died on 5 September 2016, a few weeks short of his 81st birthday, at the Aberdeen Royal Infirmary. He had had a stroke. On 14 September 2016, his funeral was held at William Black Funeral Director's in Brechin, Angus, Scotland, and he was interred at Parkgrove Crematorium, Friockheim near Brechin.

== Personal life ==
Holliday met his wife Philippa when they both worked at the Marine Research Laboratory in Scotland. They married in 1957, and had two children together. His daughter Helen is a veterinarian and his son Richard is an engineer. Lady Holliday died in December 2024.

== Honours ==
In 1971, Holliday was elected a Fellow of the Royal Society of Edinburgh (FRSE). In the 1975 Queen's Birthday Honours, he was appointed a Commander of the Order of the British Empire (CBE) in recognition of his service as Acting Principal of the University of Stirling. On 23 May 1985, he was made a Deputy Lieutenant (DL) to the Lord Lieutenant of Durham. In the 1990 Queen's Birthday Honours, he was appointed a Knight Bachelor, and therefore granted the title sir, in recognition of his service as Vice-Chancellor and Warden of the University of Durham. He was knighted by Queen Elizabeth II during a ceremony held at Buckingham Palace on 25 July 1990.

Academic offices
Preceded by Prof. Sir Derman Christopherson	Vice-Chancellor & Warden of the University of Durham; 1980–1990	Succeeded by Prof. Evelyn Ebsworth
