= Evelyn Ebsworth =

British chemist and academic

Evelyn Ebsworth CBE FRSE FRSC

Vice-Chancellor & Warden of the University of Durham
- In office 1990–1998
- Preceded by: Sir Frederick Holliday
- Succeeded by: Sir Kenneth Calman

Personal details
- Born: Evelyn Algernon Valentine Ebsworth; 14 February 1933
- Died: 16 July 2015 (aged 82)
- Education: King's College, Cambridge
- Profession: Academic and Vice-Chancellor

Evelyn Algernon Valentine Ebsworth, CBE, FRSE, FRSC (14 February 1933 – 16 July 2015) was a British chemist and academic. He was the Crum Brown Professor of Chemistry at the University of Edinburgh from 1967 to 1990, and Vice-Chancellor and Warden of Durham University from 1990 to 1998.

== Early life ==
Ebsworth was born on 14 February 1933, Valentine's Day, in Richmond, Yorkshire, England. His father, Brigadier Wilfred Ebsworth, served in the military during World War II and was posted to southern Africa. Ebsworth joined him on his posting and, from 1940 to 1945, lived in Southern Rhodesia and Kenya. He was educated at schools in many different countries before completing his education as a boarder at Marlborough College, then an all-boys Private school in Wiltshire, England.

In 1951, he matriculated into King's College, Cambridge, where he studied chemistry. He graduated with a first class honours Bachelor of Arts (BA) degree in 1954. This was promoted to a Master of Arts (MA) degree in 1958. He remained at the University of Cambridge to undertake post-graduate studies. He completed his Doctor of Philosophy (PhD) degree in 1957. His thesis was titled The preparation and properties of some silylamines and was supervised by Harry Julius Emeléus.

During his university studies he was a member of the Cambridge University Liberal Club. He held a number of senior positions, including that of President during the 1954 Lent Term.

== Academic career ==
Ebsworth was a junior research fellow at King's College, Cambridge, from 1957 to 1959. He spent the last year of the fellowship at Princeton University. In 1959, he moved to Christ's College, Cambridge, where he had been elected a fellow. He was a tutor at Christ's from 1964 to 1967. At university level, he was a demonstrator from 1959 to 1964 and then a lecturer from 1964 to 1967.

In 1967, he moved to the University of Edinburgh to take up the appointment of Crum Brown Professor of Chemistry. At the time of his appointment he was only 33 years old, unusually young for a professor. He served as dean of the Faculty of Science from 1984 to 1988.

In 1990, he moved to Durham University, where he had been appointed vice-chancellor and warden. During his time as vice-chancellor, he oversaw the expansion of the university, including the completion of an additional campus based in Stockton-on-Tees.

He retired from academia in 1998, and was appointed professor emeritus by Durham University.

== Later life ==
In 1998, Ebsworth created the Council for the Registration of Forensic Practitioners which accredited expert witnesses. He served as chairman of the council until 2005. From 2002 to 2012, he served as Chairman of Governors of two private schools in Cambridge; St Faith's School and The Leys School.

In retirement, he lived in Cambridge, England. He died on 16 July 2015.

== Personal life ==
Ebsworth was twice married. In 1955, he married his first wife, Mary Salter. Together, they had three daughters and one son. Mary died in 1987. In 1990, he married Rose Zuckerman, an American. With this marriage came five stepchildren.

== Honours ==
In 1969, Ebsworth was elected a Fellow of the Royal Society of Edinburgh (FRSE) and a Fellow of the Royal Society of Chemistry (FRSC). He was awarded the 1978 Main Group Chemistry Award by the Royal Society of Chemistry.

In 2002, he was awarded an honorary Doctor of Civil Law (DCL) degree by Durham University. This was conferred upon him during a ceremony held at the Stockton campus of the university; a place that he himself had helped create. In 2013, he was awarded an honorary Doctor of Science (ScD) degree by the University of Edinburgh 'in recognition of his major contribution to the growth in the study of Chemistry in Edinburgh'.

In the 1996 Queen's Birthday Honours, he was appointed Commander of the Order of the British Empire (CBE) 'for services to higher education'.

Academic offices
Preceded by Professor Sir Frederick Holliday	Vice-Chancellor and Warden of Durham University; 1990 to 1998	Succeeded by Professor Sir Kenneth Calman
