= Ryhope Grammar School =

Information
- Former name: Robert Richardson Grammar School
- Established: 1911
- Closed: 1988
- Alumni name: Old Ryhopeans

Ryhope Grammar School, also known as Robert Richardson Grammar Technical School, was a grammar school which existed in Ryhope, County Durham, from 1911 until 1969. It amalgamated with Ryhope Modern School to become a comprehensive school in 1969 and closed in 1988. Notable alumni include opera singer Thomas Allen and television producer Chris Cowey. Past pupils are called Old Ryhopeans.

== History ==
Ryhope Grammar School was built by Durham County Council in 1910 and opened on 16 September 1911. It was named Robert Richardson Grammar School in honour of local councillor Robert Richardson, who fought a campaign to have a grammar school built in Ryhope.

Former Ryhope Public Elementary School pupil Ralph Williams was appointed as headmaster, welcoming a first intake of 74 boys and 81 girls. Built on a four-acre site on the outskirts of Ryhope, the new school offered "every convenience, an excellent playing field and electricity throughout." A charge of £1 10 shillings per term was made to each pupil to cover tuition costs, use of apparatus, books and paper.

Ryhope Grammar School proved an immediate success. Within a year it was over-subscribed. "The school is well-disciplined and efficiently organised. Pupils are of good behaviour and staff are well chosen and highly capable," a report by education inspectors stated.

Several Old Ryhopeans fought in the First World War. Among these was Norman Pigg, the school's first sports champion, who was awarded the Distinguished Service Order, the Military Cross with two bars and three mentions in Dispatches. Fourteen Old Boys died in battle. Pigg lead a fund-raising campaign to commemorate the fallen after the war, with an organ and plaque being erected in the school hall in 1924.

Ryhope Grammar School became one of the first schools in the country to offer Advanced Courses – the fore-runner of A Levels - in 1918, allowing pupils to study until the age of 18 and move on to university degrees. In the early 1930s, when Seaham Harbour Grammar School for Girls opened, Ryhope ceased to be co-educational.

The school closed for several weeks following the outbreak of the Second World War in 1939, re-opening on a part-time basis with 21-minute lessons. It became one of the first schools in the country to form an Air Training Corps unit, and hundreds of Old Ryhopeans fought in the conflict. A total of 34 died in the six years of war.

New examinations - O Levels and A Levels - were introduced after the war and pupil numbers increased from 432 in 1947 to 586 by 1959. In 1962 the school once again opened its doors to girls and, in 1969, it amalgamated with Ryhope Modern to become a comprehensive school. The school made headlines in the 1970s, featuring on national television, with productions of the rock operas Tommy and Stardust.

Ryhope Grammar School, by now known as Ryhope School, closed in July 1988. Today modern apartments and houses stand on the site, and only the old sports field remains.

== Notable alumni ==
- Thomas Allen - Opera singer
- Harry Barnes - Labour politician
- Mervyn Brown - Diplomat
- Bernard Comrie -distinguished Professor of Linguistics UC Santa Barbara
- Chris Cowey - TV producer (The Tube)
- Robert Hawkey - 1948 Olympian
- John Jennings - Conservative politician
- Angus McIntosh - linguist and academic
- Richie Pitt - Footballer
- Ronald Radd - Broadway and TV actor
