= Ray Hudson (academic) =

British academic

Ray Hudson, FBA, FAcSS (born 7 March 1948) is a British academic. He holds the degrees of PhD and DSc from Bristol University and. DLitt from Durham University. He was professor of geography and deputy vice-chancellor at Durham University. From 2014–2015 he was acting vice-chancellor and warden of Durham University. Currently he remains as emeritus professor of geography.

== Academic career ==
A human geographer, Hudson is a specialist in developmental, economic, political and electoral geography. He has published extensively on these issues, as author or editor of over 20 books and the author or co-author of over 100 journal articles and book chapters.

In 1972, he became a lecturer in the Department of Geography, Durham University. He was promoted to senior lecturer in 1984, to reader in 1987 and to professor in 1990. He was head of the Department of Geography from 1992 to 1997. From 2003 to 2007, he was director of the Wolfson Research Institute, a multi-disciplinary research institute specialising in health and well-being. In 2007, he was appointed pro-vice-chancellor of partnerships and engagement. In 2012, he was appointed deputy vice-chancellor of the university, becoming the second most senior academic. From September 2014 to September 2015, he was acting vice-chancellor and warden of Durham University. He stood down when Professor Stuart Corbridge took up the appointment and as deputy vice chancellor in April 2016. He has recently been a visiting professor at University College Dublin and an honorary professor at Cardiff University.

== Honours ==
In 2005, Hudson was awarded the Victoria Medal by the Royal Geographical Society 'for research on regional and industrial change in the UK and wider Europe'. He was awarded the Sir Peter Hall award by the Regional Studies Association in 2014. In 2006, he was elected Fellow of the British Academy (FBA). He was also elected a Member of the European Academy (Academia Europaea) in 2007, and is an elected Fellow of the Royal Geographical Society, of the Regional Studies Association and of the Academy of Social Sciences (FAcSS). In 1987 he was awarded an honorary DSc by Roskilde University.

Academic offices
Preceded by Anthony Forster	Deputy Vice-Chancellor of Durham University; 2012 to present	Incumbent
