= University of West Attica =

University in Egaleo (Athens), Greece

- Πανεπιστήμιο Δυτικής Αττικής
- Type: Public higher education institution
- Established: 2018; 8 years ago
- Chancellor: Panagiotis Kaldis
- Undergraduates: 61,000
- Postgraduates: 5,478
- Doctoral students: 460
- Location: Athens, Greece; 38.0025°N 23.6749°E
- Campus: Urban
- Mascot: Plato
- Website: www.uniwa.gr/en/

The University of West Attica (UniWA; Greek: Πανεπιστήμιο Δυτικής Αττικής, romanized: Panepistī́mio Dytikī́s Attikī́s, ΠΑΔΑ) is a public university in Athens, Greece. It was established in 2018 as a result of the merger of the Technological Educational Institute of Athens and the Technological Educational Institute of Piraeus. The National School of Public Health also joined the newly established institution in 2019 and UniWA now comprises 6 Schools and 27 Departments covering a wide range of modern Science, including Social, Administrative and Economic Sciences, Health and Food Sciences, Engineering, and Art Studies.

Today, it is the third largest university in Greece (after the Aristotle University of Thessaloniki and the National and Kapodistrian University of Athens), and is considered the fastest growing university in the country and one of the fastest growing universities in Southeastern Europe.

== History ==
The University of West Attica was founded in March 2018 by the National Law 4521. The foundation of the newly established University came from the merging of the two former Technological Educational Institutes in Athens and Piraeus and in 2019, the National School of Public Health (Greek: Εθνική Σχολή Δημόσιας Υγείας) joined the newly established university. The National School of Public Health was originally founded by Eleftherios Venizelos as the Athens School of Health (Greek: Υγειονομική Σχολή Αθηνών) in 1929 and in 1994 took its current name.

== Studies ==
The university offers contemporary Undergraduate and Postgraduate study programs.

At UniWA, there are 27 Departments operating under the academic umbrella of 6 schools, covering a wide range of scientific fields, such as social, administrative and economic sciences, engineering sciences, health and welfare sciences, as well as food sciences and applied art and culture studies.

UniWA offers a range of educational and lifelong learning services.

In particular, the university offers:

- Undergraduate studies of 4- years leading to a bachelor's degree (level 6) of University Education or 5-year Engineering Diploma degrees (Ιntegrated master, Level 7), for the departments of the Faculty of Engineering.
- Postgraduate studies leading to a master's degree (level 7).
- Doctoral studies leading to a doctoral thesis and a doctoral degree (level 8).
- Post-doctoral research & modern research laboratories.
- Modern Lifelong Learning, vocational training and specialisation programmes.

== Schools and departments ==
The newly formed institution consists of 6 Schools and 27 Departments.

Schools	Departments
=== School of Engineering (founded 2018) ===	Department of Civil Engineering (founded 2018); Department of Electrical and Electronic Engineering (founded 2018); Department of Biomedical Engineering (founded 2018); Department of Industrial Design and Production Engineering (founded 2018); Department of Informatics and Computer Engineering (founded 2018); Department of Surveying and Geoinformatics Engineering (founded 2018); Department of Mechanical Engineering (founded 2018); Department of Naval Architecture (founded 2018)
=== School of Administrative, Economics and Social Sciences (founded 2018) ===	Department of Archival, Library & Information Studies (founded 2018); Department of Business Administration (founded 2018); Department of Tourism Management (founded 2018); Department of Social Work (founded 2018); Department of Accounting and Finance (founded 2018); Department of Early Childhood Education and Care (founded 2018)
=== School of Applied Arts and Culture (founded 2018) ===	Department of Graphic Design and Visual Communication (founded 2018); Department of Interior Architecture (founded 2018); Department of Conservation of Antiquities and Works of Art (founded 2018); Department of Photography and Audiovisual Arts (founded 2018)
=== School of Health and Care Sciences (founded 2018) ===	Department of Biomedical Sciences (founded 2018); Department of Occupational Therapy (founded 2018); Department of Midwifery (founded 2018); Department of Nursing (founded 2018); Department of Physiotherapy (founded 2018)
=== School of Public Health (founded 2019) ===	Department of Public health Policies (founded 2019); Department of Public and Community Health (founded 2018)
=== School of Food Sciences (founded 2018) ===	Department of Food Science and Technology (founded 2018); Department of Wine, Vine and Beverage Sciences (founded 2018)

== Innovation and research ==
The University of West Attica cooperates with a number of university and research institutes both in Greece and abroad. The university is also an active member of many International organizations, including the United Nations Academic Impact, which is under the auspices of the United Nations. In addition to the university, the University Research Center (URC) was established and operates since 2019, as well as the Port Management and Development Institute, specializing in the design, coordination and implementation of innovative strategic research projects in the ports of Greece. including port zones, as well as related activities. Furthermore, UNIWA is the first "Green University" in Greece, holding not only the highest position of all Greek universities, but also the 487th global position of universities in terms of sustainable development based on their evaluation in 39 indicators according to the UI GreenMetric World University Rankings. Finally, the university has the modern online news portal entitled: University Dialogues, which is a pioneering project for the Greek academic community and news.

== Student life in UniWA ==
Student clubs and groups have been developed at the university, such as: voluntary and sports groups, a theatre group, music ensembles, a student support group and numerous other groups.

== University campuses ==
The university's premises are spread over three campuses:

Egaleo Park Campus: Located within the administrative boundaries of the Municipality of Egaleo in the Western Sector of Athens surrounded by Milos, Agios Spyridonos, Dimitsanis and Edessis streets, in a short distance from the Agia Marina metro station. It occupies a total area of approximately 60 acres. The University Campus of Egaleo includes buildings with a total gross surface area of 60,000 m^{2} which house some of the departments of the University of West Attica and the administrative services. Within the Campus a total of 16 buildings have been developed to cover all the needs. Educational activities are carried out in the classrooms of the campus.

The library, which is developed within the campus, covers the cognitive, teaching and research needs of both academic staff and students. To meet these needs, the library has an extensive collection of books and journals, audiovisual material, as well as a large number of electronic journals and databases available through the Hellenic Academic Libraries Association (HEAL-Link). Both modern equipment and human resources meet the operational needs of a modern academic library. The library building extends over two floors with a total surface area of 2,520 square meters and is accessible to people with disabilities, as it has ramps and specially designed spaces. The library comprises reading spaces, meeting rooms, an archive collection area, staff offices as well as a number of auxiliary spaces.

In the Egaleo Park Campus area there is a large number of parking spaces available for the university staff, students and visitors. In addition to the teaching and research areas, the Egaleo Park Campus has a restaurant, a library, a gym, health care facilities, canteens and recreational areas for students. Finally, on the south side of the campus (entrance on Edessis Street), work is underway on the construction of a new three-storey building of 5,737.50 m^{2}. It is expected to be completed by the summer of 2024 and will provide additional modern educational and research facilities.

Ancient Olive Grove Campus: Located in the Western Sector of Athens in the municipality of Egaleo, on Petrou Rallis and Thivon avenues in the area of Ancient Olive Grove, where the famous "Walking School" of the philosopher Plato traditionally operated, and also in the area where the church of St. John was built in the 11th century AD, which in the difficult years following the fall of Constantinople was the springboard for the Hidden School. The Ancient Olive Grove Campus covers a total area of 100,000 m^{2}, while the built-up area exceeds 50,000 m^{2}. Within the Campus a total of 8 buildings have been developed which cover all the needs. Educational activities are carried out in the classrooms of the campus.The Campus, in addition to the teaching and research areas, has a restaurant, basketball court, gym, health care facilities, canteens and recreational areas for students.

Athens University Campus: It is located in the center of Athens in Ambelokipi in the Municipality of Athens, on 196 Alexandra Avenue near the metro station. The Athens University Campus is housed in the premises of the former National School of Public Health (N.S.P.H.), in a building of particular historical value which was declared a few years ago to be a listed building. The official opening of the listed building took place on 16 March 1931. The educational activities are carried out in the classrooms of the campus. All the classrooms are equipped with modern furniture, suitable for educational purposes and have modern technological and educational equipment (video projector, PC, Internet). Within the Athens University Campus a modern small conference centre has been developed, which combines high aesthetics and modern technology, in order to organise various events. The cognitive, teaching and research needs of both academic staff and students are covered by the library which has been developed within the campus.

In addition, two permanent, fully equipped ambulance stations are located on the Egaleo Park and Ancient Olive Grove campuses. In this way, the 24-hour presence of ambulance rescuers with ambulances and immediate intervention machines is ensured at the UniWA in order to provide pre-hospital care, as well as the immediate evacuation to a hospital for both the academic community of the institution and the residents of the wider area.

Finally, the 4th Campus in Moschato, Attica, at 52 Piraeus Avenue in the South sector of Athens, was delivered in 2024. The new facilities cover an area of 7,600 m^{2} and will house three departments from the School of Applied Arts and Culture: Interior Architecture, Photography, and Audiovisual Arts. The construction of the university's modern Student Hostels in the Polis Park in Ano Liosia is expected to begin soon.

== See also ==
- List of universities in Greece
- Education in Greece
- Polytechnic (Greece)
- Bologna Process
