= Ray Hudson (writer) =

American historian and poet (born 1942)

Raymond L. Hudson
- Born: 24 April 1942 (age 84); Seattle, Washington State
- Citizenship: US
- Education: Yakima Valley Community College, University of Washington
- Occupations: Teacher, writer
- Writing career
- Genres: History, art, poetry

Raymond L. Hudson (born 24 April 1942) is a historian of the Aleutian Islands, woodblock artist and poet.

== Life events ==
Hudson was raised in Yakima, Washington, in central Washington State, and at first attended Yakima Valley Community College, and in 1964 graduated from the University of Washington with a BA in philosophy.

Hudson moved to Unalaska in the Aleutians in 1964 to teach at the Unalaska City School. He remained there until 1992, when he retired.

Hudson also studied basketry with Kari Loring, and while in the Aleutians, Aleut basketry with Anfesia Shapsnikoff. He has also studied woodblock printing with Nathan Jackson, Dale DeArmond, and Lu Fang, with the latter at the National Academy of Fine Arts, Hangzhou, China.

Hudson's book Moments Rightly Placed: An Aleutian Memoir was listed as one of the top 10 books on Alaska by The Guardian. Brian Payton wrote the following about this book:

A sensitive and insightful account of 28 years living in the Aleutian Islands from the perspective of an outsider. I believe the best reportage is the kind that involves a writer immersing himself or herself in a place, culture and time. These days, being still and letting the story reveal itself is difficult to accomplish and increasingly rare. Ray Hudson offers personal and enriching insight into Aleut culture in this fine memoir.

Hudson currently resides in Middlebury, Vermont, and is working on several books, e.g. on the history of the Aleutians and Aleut basket weaving. He is an adopted member of the Qawalangin Tribe of Unalaska and a member of the Unalaska History Preservation Commission.

Hudson was raised a Lutheran, but has confessed the Baháʼí Faith since age 18.

== Publications ==
=== Books ===
- Moments Rightly Placed: An Aleutian Memoir. Epicenter Press, Fairbanks and Seattle. 2008: second edition with epilogue. 1998.
- Family After All: Alaska's Jesse Lee Home. Vol. I, Unalaska, 1889–1925. Hardscratch Press, Walnut Creek, California. 2007.
- Lost Villages of the Eastern Aleutians: Biorka, Kashega, Makushin, with Rachel Mason, Alaska Affiliated Areas, National Park Service, United States Department of the Interior. 2014.
- Ivory and Paper: Adventures In and Out of Time, University of Alaska Press. 2018.
- With Eric Hollinger, J. Christopher Dudar, and Erica B. Jones, Technical Report of the Inventory and Assessment of Human Remains and Funerary Objects from Kagamil Island of the Aleutian Archipelago, Alaska, in the Collections of the National Museum of Natural History, Smithsonian Institution. Repatriation Office, National Museum of Natural History, Smithsonian Institution. 2022.
- The Resplendent Arc. Unangax̂ kayux/ama Unangam Tanagin. A History of the Aleutian Islands. University of Alaska Press. (In press; due to appear in 2027.)

=== Books edited ===
- Unugulux Tunusangin: Oldtime Stories. Unalaska City School District, Unalaska, Alaska. 1992.
- An Aleutian Ethnography by Lucien M. Turner, edited with an introduction. University of Alaska Press, Fairbanks. 2008.
- Before the Storm: A Year in the Pribilof Islands, 1941–1942, edited with supplemental material. University of Alaska Press, Fairbanks. 2010.

=== Articles ===
- 1974 “Aleut Basketry” with Anfesia Shapsnikoff, Anthropological Publications of the University of Alaska, Vol. 16, No. 2
- 1974 “In Memoriam: Anfesia Shapsnikoff,” Orthodox Alaska, Volume IV, No. 1, 1974. [Kumatu]
- 1975 “Veniaminov,” Aleut for Beginners (with Ismail Gromoff), Unalaska City School District. Translated into Aleut by Ismail Gromoff.
- 1980 “Art Among the Aleuts,” The Aleutians, Alaska Geographic, Volume 7, No. 3.
- 1980 “Fox Trapping in the Aleutians” with Henry Swanson, The Aleutians, Alaska Geographic, Volume 7, No. 3.
- 1986 “The Hands of the Cause of God: An Appreciation,” Baháʼí World, Vol. 18 (1979–1983), Haifa, Israel: Baháʼí World Center.
- 1987 “Designs in Aleut Basketry,” Faces, Voices and Dreams, Division of Alaska State Museums, Juneau.
- 1990 “The Influence of Attu Weavers on Aleut Basketry,” The Art of Native American Basketry: A Living Legacy, edited by Frank W. Porter III, Greenwood Press, New York.
- 1995 “Aleuts in Defense of Their Homeland,” Alaska at War, 1941–1945, The Forgotten War Remembered, papers from the Alaska at War Symposium, Anchorage, Alaska, November 11–13, 1993, edited by Fern Chandonnet, Anchorage, Alaska.
- 2002 “Unalaska: Where Even Snow Has a Name,” From Kodiak to Unalaska. Alaska Geographic. Volume 29, Number 4.
- 2003 “A Landscape of Immediate Things,” Communities of Memory. Edited by Phyllis Morrow. Anthropological Papers of the University of Alaska. New Series. Vol. 3, No. 1.
- 2005 “The Beginning of Memory”. Oral Histories on the Lost Villages of the Aleutians. National Park Service, Anchorage, Alaska.
- 2005 “Hiking the Aleutians,” Adirondack Peeks. Vol. XLII, No. 1, Spring 2005.
- 2005 “The Art of Michael Rasmussen,” A Far Eye: Michael Rasmussen Retrospective, 1950–2004. Museum of the Aleutians, Unalaska, Alaska.
- 2006 “The Art of Gertrude Svarny,” Tanaang Awaa: This is a Creation of my Country. Gert Svarny Exhibit. Museum of the Aleutians, Unalaska, Alaska.
- 2008 “Foundations of New Belief”, an essay for the 200th anniversary of the building of the first chapel at Unalaska. Ounalashka Corporation, Unalaska, Alaska.
- 2008 “Unangax^ Basketry,” in Kenneth Wilson, The Aleutian Islands of Alaska: Living on the Edge. University of Alaska Press, Fairbanks.
- 2011 “Difficult Journeys: Education in the Aleutian Islands,” Museum of the Aleutians, Unalaska, Alaska.
- 2023 “The Imaginary Frontier and Its True Poverty,” an article in Alaska History, the journal of the Alaska Historical Society. This was selected as the best article published that year.

=== Supervized publications ===
- Aleut for Beginners (with Ismail Gromoff), 1975.
- Cuttlefish One, 1977.
- Cuttlefish Two: Four Villages, 1978.
- Cuttlefish Three: Home on the Bering, 1979.
- Stories Out of Slumber, 1979.
- Cuttlefish Four: Unalaska Today, 1980.
- Cuttlefish Five: The Aleutian Invasion, 1981.
- Cuttlefish Six: The Unknown Islands—Life and Stories of Henry Swanson, 1982.
- People of the Aleutian Islands, 1982.

== Woodblock Print Shows ==
- 1996 Retrospective of 165 works at Nicky's Place Gallery, Unalaska, AK
- 1997 Reflections on Basin Harbor, Vergennes, VT
- 1997 State of Alaska, traveling show commemorating the bicentennial of the birth of Ivan Veniaminov (St. Innocent)
- 1998 Solo show, Museum of Contemporary Art, Petropavlovsk, Russia
- 2003 Cancelled, Flynndog, Burlington, VT
- 2003 Featured artist, Vermont State Craft Center at Frog Hollow, Middlebury, VT
- 2003 Reflections on Basin Harbor, Vergennes, VT
- 2004 Returned by Place: A Retrospective, Museum of the Aleutians, Unalaska, AK
- 2004 Reflections on Basin Harbor, Vergennes, VT
- 2008 Marginal Angels/ Fugitive Landscape, Carol's Hungry Mind Café, Middlebury, VT
- 2009 Solo show, Ilsley Public Library, Middlebury, VT
- 2009 Solo show, Walkover Gallery, Bristol, VT
- 2010 Group show, Small Treasurers. Jackson Gallery, Middlebury, VT
- 2011 Group show, Taking Flight. Jackson Gallery, Middlebury, VT
- 2011 Group show, Earth, Fire, Water, Wind. Museum of the Aleutians. Unalaska, AK
- 2014 Three Woodblock Artists (with Jane Eddy and Barbara Ekedahl), Jackson Gallery, Middlebury, VT
- 2016 Group show, Jackson Gallery, Middlebury, VT
- 2017 Two woodcuts in Living Alaska: A Decade of Collecting Contemporary Art for Alaska Museums, traveling exhibit curated by the Anchorage Museum, Anchorage, AK
- 2018 Group show, Jackson Gallery, Middlebury, VT.

== Awards ==
- Leo Reano Award, from National Education Association, for work with First Americans.
- 1990 Governor's Award for the Arts, Alaska State Council on the Arts.
- 2006 The Alaska Historical Society listed Moments Rightly Placed among the sixty-seven most important books on Alaska.
