= Kenneth Calman =

Scottish doctor and cancer researcher (1941–2025)

Sir Kenneth Calman KCB DL FRCP FRCS FRSE FRCGP
- Calman in 2019

Chancellor of the University of Glasgow
- In office 23 January 2006 – 15 June 2020
- Preceded by: Sir William Kerr Fraser
- Succeeded by: Dame Katherine Grainger

Warden and Vice-Chancellor of the University of Durham
- In office 1998–2006
- Preceded by: Evelyn Ebsworth
- Succeeded by: Chris Higgins

Chief Medical Officer for Her Majesty's Government
- In office 1 January 1991 – 31 December 1997
- Preceded by: Sir Donald Acheson
- Succeeded by: Sir Liam Donaldson

Chief Medical Officer for Scotland
- In office 1989–1991
- Preceded by: Iain Macdonald
- Succeeded by: Robert Evan Kendell

Personal details
- Born: 25 December 1941 Glasgow, Scotland
- Died: 21 July 2025 (aged 83) Glasgow, Scotland
- Spouse: Ann Wilkie (m. 1967)
- Children: 3, including Susan
- Education: University of Glasgow
- Profession: Physician, surgeon, author

Sir Kenneth Charles Calman (25 December 1941 – 21 July 2025) was a Scottish doctor and academic who worked as a surgeon, oncologist and cancer researcher, and held the position of Chief Medical Officer of Scotland, and then England. He was Warden and Vice-Chancellor of Durham University from 1998 to 2006 before becoming Chancellor of the University of Glasgow. He held the position of Chair of the National Cancer Research Institute from 2008 until 2011. From 2008 to 2009, he was convener of the Calman Commission on Scottish devolution.

== Early life ==
Kenneth Calman was born on 25 December 1941 to Grace Douglas Don and Arthur McIntosh Calman. He was educated at Allan Glen's School and the University of Glasgow. He began medical training and graduated with an intercalated BSc degree in biochemistry in 1964 while studying for his MB ChB, the general medical degree that he completed in 1967. He undertook a PhD in dermatology and also received an MD with Honours in organ preservation.

== Career ==
Calman became Hall Fellow and lecturer in surgery at the University of Glasgow in 1969, and between 1972 and 1974, was a clinical research fellow at the Chester Beatty Research Institute in London, funded by the Medical Research Council.

In 1974, Calman was appointed to the new chair of clinical oncology at the University of Glasgow at the age of 32 years. He became dean of postgraduate medicine at the University of Glasgow in 1984.

Calman was appointed chief medical officer for Scotland, at the Scottish Office in 1989. He was then appointed chief medical officer for England in 1991, by the United Kingdom government, at the Department of Health in 1991. He was in post until 1998, a period that included the BSE crisis.

He was the UK representative at the World Health Organization and chaired its executive committee in 1988–1989.

In 1998, he was appointed vice-chancellor and warden of Durham University. His time as vice-chancellor saw the expansion and integration of the campus at Stockton-on-Tees, with two colleges being established there in 2001 and the campus being renamed Queen's Campus during the 2002 Golden Jubilee celebrations. A new college was also opened in 2006, Josephine Butler College. There was also a return to the teaching of medicine at Durham, with students doing their pre-clinical studies at Queen's Campus before transferring to Newcastle to complete the clinical part of their degrees. His time as vice-chancellor also saw the closure of the Department of Applied Linguistics in 2003 and Department of East Asian Studies in 2007. Professor Calman retired as Warden in 2007 and was succeeded by Professor Christopher Higgins.

Calman was a member of the Nuffield Council on Bioethics from 2000 to 2008. He chaired its inquiry on the Ethics of research related to healthcare in developing countries from 2000 to 2002, and was a member of the Working Party on Public health from 2006 to 2007. In 2004, he was appointed to the Scottish Science Advisory Council (SSAC).

On 23 January 2006, it was announced that Calman had been elected Chancellor of the University of Glasgow by the General Council of the university, taking around 60 per cent of the vote against opponent Professor Sir Neil MacCormick, a former MEP, jurist and son of John MacCormick, former Rector of the university. In 2007, he gave the Stanley Nisbet Lecture on "The Role of the University in the 21st Century". He was Chancellor for fourteen years and retired in June 2020 at the age of 78.

In 1980, he set up a charity, Tak Tent, which is derived from a Scots phrase meaning "Take Care"; it would later be known as "Cancer Support Scotland". Calman was chair of the Board of Trustees of the National Trust for Scotland from 2010 to 2015. On leaving that position, he was gifted a sundial which was installed at Brodick Castle. On 1 October 2016, he took up the position of chair of the Board of National Library of Scotland.

He was involved with writing and editing multiple works, with more than 15 books published, mainly on medical topics. He had many papers published on medicine, health and science. His first book was published in 1971, a pocketbook for doctors called Basic Skills for Surgical Housemen. In 1978, with John Paul, he wrote An Introduction to Cancer Medicine, which was aimed at undergraduates. A collection of his essays, The Potential for Health, was published in 1998. A Study of Story Telling, Humour and Learning in Medicine: H M Queen Mother Fellowship, Eighth Lecture was published in 2001. His memoir It Started in a Cupboard was published in 2019.

=== Calman Commission ===
Calman was the chair of a commission established by the Scottish Parliament in March 2008 to review Scottish devolution, commonly referred to as the Calman Commission. Other Commission members include former Lord Advocate Colin Boyd, former Deputy First Minister Jim Wallace, and Mona Siddiqui, Professor of Islamic Studies at the University of Glasgow. The Commission published its first interim report in December 2008, and published its final report on 15 June 2009. The Commission recommended, among other things, that the Scottish Parliament receive greater tax-raising powers as well as control over the regulation of airguns, the administration of elections, drink-driving limits and the national speed limit.

In 2014, he took on the role of honorary president of the Friends of Glasgow University Library. He chaired the Glasgow City of Science 2010–2015 and then continued as honorary president.

== Personal life and death ==
Calman was President of the Boys' Brigade from 2008 until 2011, and addressed his first council meeting as president at Tulliallan Castle in September 2008.

He liked to write poetry. In 2013, he graduated with a Master of Letters degree from the University of Glasgow with a thesis on Scottish literature and medicine. This was subsequently published as a book, A Doctor's Line, in 2014.

Calman married Ann Wilkie in 1967, and had a son and two daughters, one of whom is the comedian Susan Calman and one of whom is Professor Lynn Calman.

He enjoyed collecting cartoons and sundials.

Calman died from a short illness on 21 July 2025, at the age of 83, at the Queen Elizabeth University Hospital, Glasgow.

== Honours and awards ==
Calman received honorary degrees from the universities of Glasgow, Aberdeen, Nottingham, Newcastle, Birmingham, Stirling, Paisley, Westminster and Brighton, the Open University and Glasgow Caledonian University.

He gained Fellowship of the Royal College of Surgeons of Edinburgh in 1971. He was elected as a Fellow of the Royal Society of Edinburgh in their clinical sciences discipline in 1979. He was a Fellow of the Royal College of Physicians. He was made a Knight Commander of the Order of the Bath in the 1996 New Year Honours.

He received many honorary fellowships. In 1997 he received Fellowship ad eundem from the Royal College of Obstetricians and Gynaecologists and an honorary fellowship from the Royal College of Surgeons in Ireland. He was elected to the Academy of Medical Sciences in 1998. He became a Fellow of the Royal College of Physicians and Surgeons of Glasgow in 2005. He gave the Royal College of General Practitioners' William Pickles lecture in 2000. He was an Honorary Fellow of the Academy of Medical Educators. Since 2009, the Academy of Medical Educators has held a lecture named for him. In 2009, he was appointed a Deputy Lieutenant in the City of Glasgow.

== Sources ==
- Sheard, Sally; Donaldson, Liam (2005). The Nation's Doctor. London: The Nuffield Trust. ISBN 978-1846190018.

Government offices
Preceded by Iain Macdonald	Chief Medical Officer for Scotland; 1989–1991	Succeeded by Robert Kendell
Preceded by Sir Donald Acheson	Chief Medical Officer for Her Majesty's Government; 1991–1998	Succeeded by Sir Liam Donaldson
Academic offices
Preceded by Professor Evelyn Ebsworth	Warden and Vice-Chancellor of the University of Durham; 1998 to 2007	Succeeded by Professor Christopher Higgins
Preceded by Sir William Kerr Fraser	Chancellor of the University of Glasgow; 2006–2020	Succeeded by Dame Katherine Grainger
