= Technological Educational Institute of Piraeus =

Defunct tertiary education institute in Greece

Coordinates: 37.978°N 23.672°E

Piraeus University of Applied Sciences
- Α.Ε.Ι. ΠΕΙΡΑΙΑ Τ.Τ.
- Type: Public; Higher Education; Greece University System; University of Applied Sciences
- Active: 1983–2018
- Academic staff: 1.000 (before merge)
- Administrative staff: ~250 (before merge)
- Students: 20.000 (before merge)
- Location: Egaleo, Athens, Greece
- Campus: Egaleo; Spetses
- Website: http://teipir.gr/index.php/en/

The Piraeus University of Applied Sciences (Greek: Ανώτατο Εκπαιδευτικό Ίδρυμα Πειραιά Τεχνολογικού Τομέα, A.E.I. Πειραιά Τ.Τ.), also known as Technological Education Institute of Piraeus (TEIPIR), was a public higher education institute in Athens, Greece, supervised by the Ministry of Education and Research. It was created by a special law in 1976 as a merging result of the Anastasiadis School (founded in 1947) and the Sivitanidios School (founded in 1957), and was established with the 1983 related law (Ν.1404/1983).

In 2018 TEI of Piraeus merged with TEI of Athens forming the newly established University of West Attica (Greek: Πανεπιστήμιο Δυτικής Αττικής).

== Overview ==
The Piraeus University of Applied Sciences used to provide a high level of technological education and applied research in the equivalent taught areas, offering more than twenty different degrees that range from Engineering to Economics and Business Administration.

The school was one of the independent and self-administered Applied Sciences Universities (also known as Technological Education Institutes) in accordance with the related Greek laws 2916/2001, 3549/2007 and 4009/2011. Technological Education Institutes differ from other Greek Universities in the applied character of their studies, placing emphasis on laboratory courses and internships.

== Schools and departments ==
The institution included two Schools, consisting of nine Departments.

| Schools | Departments |
|---|---|
| School of Engineering | Department of Automation Engineering; Department of Mechanical Engineering; Department of Civil Engineering; Department of Electronics Engineering; Department of Electrical Engineering; Department of Computer Systems Engineering; Department of Textile Engineering |
| School of Business and Economics | Department of Accounting and Finance; Department of Business Administration |

== Postgraduate education ==
The Piraeus University of Applied Sciences used to offer several approved graduate courses independently or in cooperation with universities and abroad.

== Campus ==
The university campus is in a grove 100,000 sq.m in the wider area which housed the Academy of Plato. The facilities are accessible with bus services and metro connection to the rest of Athens and are currently used by University of West Attica.

== See also ==
- List of universities in Greece
- Technological Educational Institute of Athens
