= Technological Educational Institute of Athens =

Defunct tertiary education institute in Greece

Coordinates: 38.003°N 23.676°E

Advanced Technological Educational Institute (ATEI) of Athens
- Ανώτατο Τεχνολογικό Εκπαιδευτικό Ίδρυμα Αθήνας
- Former name: Centre of Highest Technical Education (1974–1983)
- Type: Public; Higher Education; Greece University System; University of Applied Sciences
- Active: 1974–2018
- Academic staff: 600 permanent and 1700 temporary contract faculty staff (before merge)
- Administrative staff: 350 (before merge)
- Students: 35,000 (before merge)
- Location: Athens, Greece
- Campus: Urban
- Website: www.teiath.gr

The Technological Educational Institute (TEI) of Athens (TEI ATH; Greek: Ανώτατο Τεχνολογικό Εκπαιδευτικό Ίδρυμα Αθήνας, Anótato Technologikó Ekpaideutikó Ídryma Athínas) was a state higher-educational institute in Athens for the applied sciences.

Founded in 1983, it originated from one of the first five Centres for Higher Technical Education (Greek: Κέντρα Ανώτερης Τεχνικής Επαγγελματικής Εκπαίδευσης, Κ.Α.Τ.Ε.Ε., romanized: Kéntra Anóteris Technikís Epaggelmatikís Ekpaídeusis) initially established in 1974. It offered a wide range of undergraduate and some (level 7) postgraduate studies.

On 1 March 2018, the institute merged with the ΤΕΙ of Piraeus; the merged organization became a University Institution, the newly established University of West Attica (Greek: Πανεπιστήμιο Δυτικής Αττικής).

== History ==
The institute was originally one of the first five KATE (Centers for Higher Technical Education, later KATEE) founded in Greece in 1974 to offer non-university technical and vocational programmes. In 1983, the KATEE were dissolved and Technological Educational Institutes were established as self-governed, multi-disciplinary, technology-oriented state funded institutions and are equal to the Greek universities. The TEI of Athens was the largest of Greece's TEIs, with 33 departments, 1,181 teaching staff and 16,288 students enrolled in 1986-87.

== Academic profile ==
=== Campus ===
Located in Aegaleo municipality, in the western part of Athens, the campus occupied an extended area, comprising the central administrative services and most of the facilities. This is currently the Egaleo Park Campus of the University of West Attica.

=== Faculties and departments ===
The TEI of Athens offered more than 35 undergraduate degrees ranging from Management and Economics to Applied Sciences and Engineering. The language of instruction and coursework was Greek, but some courses were also offered in English.

The departments were organized in five Faculties, Technological Applications, Health and Caring Professions, Fine Arts and Design, Food Technology and Nutrition and Management and Economics.

	Departments
Faculty of Technological Applications	Department of Energy Technology Engineering; Department of Electronics Engineering; Department of Naval Architecture and Marine Engineering; Department of Informatics; Department of Medical Instrument Technology; Department of Civil Engineering and Surveying and Geoinformatics Engineering
Faculty of Food Technology and Nutrition	Department of Oenology and Beverage Technology; Department of Food Technology
Faculty of Health and Caring Professions	Department of Aesthetics and Cosmetology; Department of Early Childhood Education; Department of Physiotherapy; Department of Midwifery; Department of Nursing; Department of Public Health; Department of Health Visiting; Department of Occupational Therapy; Department of Medical Laboratories; Department of Social Work; Department of Dental Technology; Department of Optics and Optometry; Department of Medical Radiology Technology
Faculty of Management and Economics	Department of Librarianship and Information Systems; Department of Business Administration; Department of Marketing
Faculty of Fine Arts and Design	Department of Graphic Art and Design; Department of Photography and Audiovisual Arts; Department of Interior Architecture, Decoration and Design; Department of Antiquities and Works of Art Conservation

== Academic evaluation ==
In 2015, the external evaluation of the institution cited TEI of Athens as Worthy of merit.

An external evaluation of all academic departments in Greek universities was conducted by the Hellenic Quality Assurance and Accreditation Agency (HQA).

- Department of Informatics (2008)
- Department of Librarianship and Information Systems (2011)
- Department of Electronics (2010)
- Department of Naval Architecture (2010)
- Department of Energy Technology (2012)
- Department of Dental Technology (2010)
- Department of Nursing A' and B' (2011)
- Department of Midwifery (2011)
- Department of Physiotherapy (2012)
- Department of Optics and Optometry (2011)
- Department of Medical Radiology Technology (2011)
- Department of Medical Laboratories (2012)
- Department of Social Work (2013)
- Department of Occupational Therapy (2014)
- Department of Early Childhood Education (2014)
- Department of Aesthetics and Cosmetology (2014)
- Department of Food Technology (2011)
- Department of Oenology and Beverage Technology (2011)
- Department of Photography and Audiovisual Arts (2014)
- Department of Interior Architecture, Decoration and Design (2014)
- Department of Conservation of Antiquities and Works of Art (2011)
- Career Office and Innovation Unit (DASTA)

== See also ==
- List of research institutes in Greece
- List of universities in Greece
- TEI of Thessaloniki
- TEI of Piraeus
