= Stuart Corbridge =

British geographer

Stuart Corbridge FRGS
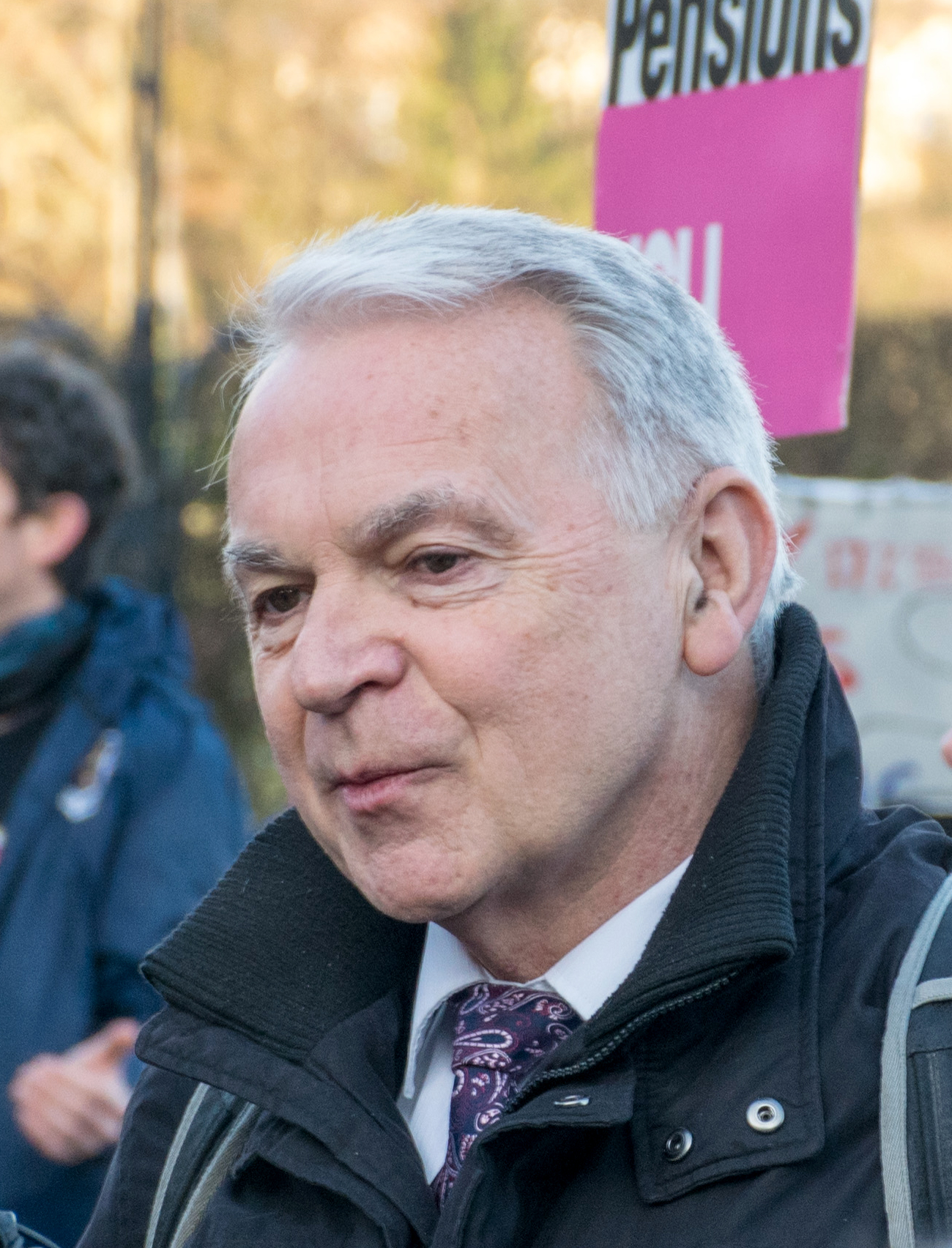
- Corbridge visiting a picket line during 2019 university strikes

24th Vice-Chancellor and Warden of Durham University
- In office September 2015 – July 2021
- Preceded by: Chris Higgins
- Succeeded by: Karen O'Brien

Deputy Director and Provost London School of Economics
- In office September 2013 – September 2015
- Succeeded by: Robin Mansell

Personal details
- Born: Stuart Edward Corbridge; 1957 (age 68–69)
- Citizenship: United Kingdom
- Website: https://www.dur.ac.uk/vice.chancellor/
- Scientific career
- Education: Sidney Sussex College, Cambridge; St John's College, Cambridge
- Fields: Geopolitics; Development studies
- Workplaces: Huddersfield Polytechnic; Royal Holloway, University of London; Syracuse University; University of Cambridge; University of Miami; London School of Economics; Durham University
- Thesis: State, Tribe and Region: Policy and Politics in Jharkhand, India, 1880 - 1980 (1986)
- Doctoral advisor: Ben H. Farmer

Stuart Edward Corbridge, FRGS (born 1957) is a British geographer and academic specialising in geopolitics, development studies, and India. From September 2015 to July 2021, he was Vice-Chancellor and Warden of Durham University. From 2013 to 2015, he was Provost and Deputy Director of the London School of Economics. He was also Professor of Development Studies at LSE.

== Early life ==
Corbridge was born in 1957. He was brought up in the West Midlands of England. Having gained entry to the University of Cambridge, he studied geography at Sidney Sussex College, Cambridge. His lecturers included Derek Gregory, Polly Hill, and Ajit Singh. He graduated in 1978 with a first class Bachelor of Arts (BA) degree; as per tradition, his BA was later promoted to Master of Arts (MA Cantab). He remained at Cambridge to undertake postgraduate study at St John's College, Cambridge. He completed his Doctor of Philosophy (PhD) degree in 1986. His supervisor was Dr Ben H. Farmer and his thesis was titled "State, Tribe and Region: Policy and Politics in Jharkhand, India, 1880 - 1980".

== Academic career ==
From 1981 to 1985, Corbridge was a part-time lecturer in geography at Huddersfield Polytechnic. He was first published in 1982 while he was a postgraduate student. He moved from Huddersfield Polytechnic to Royal Holloway, University of London, where he was a lecturer in geography for two years. From 1987 to 1988, he held a position in the United States of America: he was an associate professor of the Maxwell School of Citizenship and Public Affairs, Syracuse University. He then returned to his alma mater, the University of Cambridge. From 1988 to 1999, he was a lecturer in South Asian geography and a fellow of Sidney Sussex College, Cambridge.

In 1999, he once more moved to the United States and took up his first appointment as a full professor. From 1999 to 2003, he was Professor of International Studies at the University of Miami. However, because of internal events at the university he left to return to the United Kingdom. He joined the London School of Economics (LSE) as professor of geography, soon transferring to International Development. He was Head of the Department of International Development from August 2007 to July 2010. Between 2010 and 2013, he served as Pro-Director for Research. In September 2013, he was appointed Provost and Deputy Director of LSE.

In March 2015, it was announced that Corbridge had been selected as the next Vice-Chancellor and Warden of Durham University. He took up the appointment in September 2015 and was Durham's 24th vice-chancellor. In April 2020, Corbridge was at the centre of a controversy surrounding proposed changes to the provision of teaching at Durham University. The proposed changes, which would have involved reducing the number of modules delivered in person by 25% in favour of courses taught either primarily or entirely online, were criticized by university staff and students. After significant resistance the plans were retracted from the university senate, with Corbridge commenting that he was "happy to say that I think we misjudged our academics. It is very clear that most academics do not want to let go of their courses".

In May 2020, the Chair of Council announced that Corbridge would retire on 31 July 2021.

== Personal life ==
Corbridge's partner is Pilar Saborio de Rocafort, a former Costa Rican diplomat. From 2007 to 2015, she was Costa Rica's ambassador to the United Kingdom, and held several other positions. In February 2015, she became Costa Rica's Permanent Representative to the United Nations. and now works in corporate diplomacy.

== Scholarly work ==
Corbridge has made several major contributions to international development theory, beginning in 1986 with his critiques of radical development. His empirical work is on peasant economy and rural development in India, and the nature of the Indian state as that country undergoes rapid transformation into a capitalist economy.

== Selected works ==
- Corbridge, Stuart (1982). "Urban bias, rural bias and industrialisation: an appraisal of the work of Michael Lipton and Terry Byres". In Harriss, John (ed.). Rural Development: Theories of Peasant Economy and Agrarian Change. London: Hutchinson. pp. 94–116.
- Corbridge, Stuart (1986). Capitalist World Development: A Critique of Radical Development Geography. London: Macmillan. ISBN 0847675092.
- Corbridge, Stuart (1993). Debt and Development. Oxford: Blackwell. ISBN 0631179046.
- Corbridge, Stuart, ed. (1993). World Economy. Oxford: Oxford University Press.
- Corbridge, Stuart; Martin, Ron; Thrift, Nigel, eds. (1994). Money, Power and Space. Oxford: Blackwell. ISBN 0631192018.
- Agnew, John; Corbridge, Stuart (1995). Mastering Space: Hegemony, Territory and International Political Economy. London: Routledge. ISBN 0415094348.
- Corbridge, Stuart, ed. (1995). Development Studies: A Reader. London: Edward Arnold.
- Corbridge, Stuart; Harriss, John (2000). Reinventing India: Liberalization, Hindu Nationalism and Popular Democracy (1st ed.). Cambridge: Polity. ISBN 0745620779.
- Corbridge, Stuart; Jewitt, Sarah; Kumar, Sanjay (2004). Jharkhand: Environment, Development, Ethnicity. New Delhi: Oxford University Press. ISBN 0195667700.
- Corbridge, Stuart; Williams, Glyn; Srivastava, Manoj; Véron, René (2005). Seeing the State: Governance and Governmentality in India. Cambridge: Cambridge University Press. ISBN 1107614694.
- Raju, Saraswati; Kumar, M. Satish; Corbridge, Stuart, eds. (2006). Colonial and Post-Colonial Geographies of India. New Delhi: Sage.
- Chari, Sharad; Corbridge, Stuart, eds. (2008). The Development Reader. London: Routledge.
- Sengupta, Chandan; Corbridge, Stuart, eds. (2010). Democracy, Development and Decentralisation in India: Continuing Debates. New Delhi: Routledge. ISBN 978-0415563178.
- Ruparelia, Sanjay; Reddy, Sanjay; Harriss, John; Corbridge, Stuart, eds. (2011). Understanding India's New Political Economy: A Great Transformation?. London: Routledge. ISBN 978-0415598118.
- Corbridge, Stuart; Harriss, John; Jeffrey, Craig (2012). India Today: Economy, Politics and Society. Cambridge: Polity Press. ISBN 978-0745661124.
- Corbridge, Stuart; Shah, Alpa, eds. (2014). The Underbelly of the Indian Boom. London: Routledge. ISBN 978-1138809697.

Academic offices
Preceded by Chris Higgins	Vice-Chancellor and Warden of Durham University; 2015 to 2021	Succeeded by Karen O'Brien
