= Patrick McCarthy (conductor) =

English conductor and singer

Patrick McCarthy (born 1947) is an English conductor and singer.

== Biography ==
McCarthy trained as a baritone singer at the Guildhall School of Music and Drama and the London Opera Centre. He first attended The Proms in 1959.

=== 7 August 1974 ===
On 7 August 1974, McCarthy was in attendance at The Proms performance of Carl Orff's Carmina Burana, performed by the London Symphony Orchestra and conducted by André Previn in the Royal Albert Hall. During the performance of the Orff, Thomas Allen (now Sir Thomas), the baritone soloist, fell ill during the performance, collapsed onto his chair, and was carried off from the stage. McCarthy went backstage and offered his services as a professional singer who was experienced with the piece. The understudy for the part, a member of the London Symphony Chorus, was a doctor and attended to Allen, and thus was unable to step into the performance. McCarthy's offer was accepted and McCarthy completed the performance. He received a standing ovation and national attention.

=== Subsequent career ===
McCarthy continued his career in music with performances in opera, music hall, and musical theatre. In 1980, McCarthy re-located from London to Colchester. His voice had changed and he became a tenor singer, before moving to orchestral and choral conducting in 1992. In 1992, he founded the Colchester Bach Choir and Orchestra, and subsequently founded the Colchester Philharmonic. McCarthy was musical director of The Witham Choral Society, and for 20 years was musical director of the Harwich and Dovercourt Choral Society. McCarthy retired from conducting in 2022, in the wake of deteriorating eyesight.

McCarthy and his wife Mary have two children.

== Recordings ==
- "Vital Spark of Heav'nly Flame" (Hyperion, 1997)
- "Haydn and his English Friends" (Hyperion, 1999)
