= Chris Higgins (academic) =

British geneticist and Vice-Chancellor of Durham University

Christopher Francis Higgins
- Born: 24 June 1955 (age 71)
- Education: Royal College of Music; Durham University
- Children: Five
- Awards: FRSE; FMedSci; EMBO member FRSA
- Scientific career
- Fields: Genetics
- Workplaces: Durham University; University of Oxford; Imperial College London; University of Dundee
- Thesis: Peptide transport by embryos of germinating barley, Hordeum vulgare (1979)
- Doctoral advisor: John W. Payne
- Website: www.dur.ac.uk/vice.chancellor

Christopher Francis Higgins FRSE FRSA FMedSci (born 24 June 1955) is a British molecular biologist, geneticist, academic and scientific advisor. He was the Vice-Chancellor of Durham University from 2007 to 2014. He was previously the director of the MRC Clinical Sciences Centre and Head of Division in the Faculty of Medicine at Imperial College London.

== Early life ==
Higgins was born on 24 June 1955 in Cambridge, England. He studied botany at Grey College, Durham University, graduating with a first class degree in 1976. He was awarded a PhD in 1979 for his study of peptide transporters in the embryos of germinating Barley. Working at University of Dundee, his focus turned to genetics and cell biology.

== Career ==
Higgins was appointed Nuffield Professor of Clinical Biochemistry at the University of Oxford. He has published over 200 papers in leading scientific journals like Nature, Science and Cell.

In April 2007, he was appointed Vice-Chancellor of Durham University. He succeeded Sir Kenneth Calman and became the University's 23rd Vice-Chancellor. He took early retirement on 30 September 2014, following a discussion at Senate on limiting the powers of the Vice Chancellor.

Higgins has been recognised by the Institute for Scientific Information (ISI) as a 'Most Highly Cited' author. Further awards have been the CIBA Medal, Fleming Prize, and a Howard Hughes International Scholarship along with election to Fellow of the European Molecular Biology Organization, the Royal Society of Edinburgh, the Royal Society of Arts and the Academy of Medical Sciences.

Alongside his academic career, Higgins has also served as a scientific advisor for the House of Lords Select Committee on Stem Cell Research and advisor to the House of Commons Select Committee on Science and Technology. At present Higgins is the chair of the Spongiform Encephalopathy Advisory Committee, International Review Panel, DKFZ (German National Cancer Centre, Heidelberg) and a trustee of the Kennedy Institute for Rheumatology.

== Bibliography ==
=== Nature ===
- Higgins, C. F. (2007). "Multiple molecular mechanisms for multidrug resistance transporters". Nature. 446 (7137): 749–757. Bibcode:2007Natur.446..749H. doi:10.1038/nature05630. PMID 17429392. S2CID 4414214.
- Van Veen, H. W.; Callaghan, R.; Soceneantu, L.; Sardini, A.; Konings, W. N.; Higgins, C. F. (1998). "A bacterial antibiotic-resistance gene that complements the human multidrug-resistance P-glycoprotein gene". Nature. 391 (6664): 291–295. Bibcode:1998Natur.391..291V. doi:10.1038/34669. PMID 9440694. S2CID 205003632.
- Moxon, E. R.; Higgins, C. F. (1997). "E. Coli genome sequence. A blueprint for life". Nature. 389 (6647): 120–121. Bibcode:1997Natur.389Q.120M. doi:10.1038/38107. PMID 9296482. S2CID 4404558.
- Py, B. A.; Higgins, C. F.; Krisch, H. M.; Carpousis, A. J. (1996). "A DEAD-box RNA helicase in the Escherichia coli RNA degradosome". Nature. 381 (6578): 169–172. Bibcode:1996Natur.381..169P. doi:10.1038/381169a0. PMID 8610017. S2CID 4273395.
- Hyde, S. C.; Gill, D. R.; Higgins, C. F.; Trezise, A. E. O.; MacVinish, L. J.; Cuthbert, A. W.; Ratcliff, R.; Evans, M. J.; Colledge, W. H. (1993). "Correction of the ion transport defect in cystic fibrosis transgenic mice by gene therapy". Nature. 362 (6417): 250–255. Bibcode:1993Natur.362..250H. doi:10.1038/362250a0. PMID 7681548. S2CID 4273074.
- Valverde, M. A.; Díaz, M.; Sepúlveda, F. V.; Gill, D. R.; Hyde, S. C.; Higgins, C. F. (1992). "Volume-regulated chloride channels associated with the human multidrug-resistance P-glycoprotein". Nature. 355 (6363): 830–833. Bibcode:1992Natur.355..830V. doi:10.1038/355830a0. PMID 1371598. S2CID 4275168.
- Higgins, C. F.; Hyde, S. C. (1991). "Channelling our thoughts". Nature. 352 (6332): 194–195. Bibcode:1991Natur.352..194H. doi:10.1038/352194a0. PMID 1713302. S2CID 5525702.
- Hyde, S. C.; Emsley, P.; Hartshorn, M. J.; Mimmack, M. M.; Gileadi, U.; Pearce, S. R.; Gallagher, M. P.; Gill, D. R.; Hubbard, R. E.; Higgins, C. F. (1990). "Structural model of ATP-binding proteing associated with cystic fibrosis, multidrug resistance and bacterial transport". Nature. 346 (6282): 362–365. Bibcode:1990Natur.346..362H. doi:10.1038/346362a0. PMID 1973824. S2CID 1364720.
- Dorman, C. J.; Bhriain, N. N.; Higgins, C. F. (1990). "DNA supercoiling and environmental regulation of virulence gene expression in Shigella flexneri". Nature. 344 (6268): 789–792. Bibcode:1990Natur.344..789D. doi:10.1038/344789a0. PMID 2184366. S2CID 4358173.
- Higgins, C. F.; Hiles, I. D.; Salmond, G. P. C.; Gill, D. R.; Downie, J. A.; Evans, I. J.; Holland, I. B.; Gray, L.; Buckel, S. D.; Bell, A. W.; Hermodson, M. A. (1986). "A family of related ATP-binding subunits coupled to many distinct biological processes in bacteria". Nature. 323 (6087): 448–450. Bibcode:1986Natur.323..448H. doi:10.1038/323448a0. PMID 3762694. S2CID 4255180.
- Manson, M. D.; Blank, V.; Brade, G.; Higgins, C. F. (1986). "Peptide chemotaxis in E. Coli involves the Tap signal transducer and the dipeptide permease". Nature. 321 (6067): 253–256. Bibcode:1986Natur.321..253M. doi:10.1038/321253a0. PMID 3520334. S2CID 1140124.
- Higgins, C. F.; Ames, G. F.; Barnes, W. M.; Clement, J. M.; Hofnung, M. (1982). "A novel intercistronic regulatory element of prokaryotic operons". Nature. 298 (5876): 760–762. Bibcode:1982Natur.298..760H. doi:10.1038/298760a0. PMID 7110312. S2CID 4250421.
- Higgins, C. F.; Haag, P. D.; Nikaido, K.; Ardeshir, F.; Garcia, G.; Ames, G. F. (1982). "Complete nucleotide sequence and identification of membrane components of the histidine transport operon of S. Typhimurium". Nature. 298 (5876): 723–727. Bibcode:1982Natur.298..723H. doi:10.1038/298723a0. PMID 7050725. S2CID 4266380.

=== Science ===
- Higgins, C. F.; Linton, K. J. (2001). "STRUCTURAL BIOLOGY: The xyz of ABC Transporters". Science. 293 (5536): 1782–1784. doi:10.1126/science.1065588. PMID 11546861. S2CID 83363016.
- Tame, J. R.; Murshudov, G. N.; Dodson, E. J.; Neil, T. K.; Dodson, G. G.; Higgins, C. F.; Wilkinson, A. J. (1994). "The structural basis of sequence-independent peptide binding by OppA protein". Science. 264 (5165): 1578–1581. Bibcode:1994Sci...264.1578T. doi:10.1126/science.8202710. PMID 8202710.

=== Cell ===
- Higgins, C. F. (1995). "The ABC of channel regulation". Cell. 82 (5): 693–696. doi:10.1016/0092-8674(95)90465-4. PMID 7671298. S2CID 16514040.
- Higgins, C. F. (1994). "Flip-flop: The transmembrane translocation of lipids". Cell. 79 (3): 393–395. doi:10.1016/0092-8674(94)90248-8. PMID 7954806. S2CID 22464923.
- Owen-Hughes, T. A.; Pavitt, G. D.; Santos, D. S.; Sidebotham, J. M.; Hulton, C. S.; Hinton, J. C.; Higgins, C. F. (1992). "The chromatin-associated protein H-NS interacts with curved DNA to influence DNA topology and gene expression". Cell. 71 (2): 255–265. doi:10.1016/0092-8674(92)90354-F. PMID 1423593. S2CID 33653978.
- Gill, D. R.; Hyde, S. C.; Higgins, C. F.; Valverde, M. A.; Mintenig, G. M.; Sepúlveda, F. V. (1992). "Separation of drug transport and chloride channel functions of the human multidrug resistance P-glycoprotein". Cell. 71 (1): 23–32. doi:10.1016/0092-8674(92)90263-C. PMID 1382860. S2CID 10797659.
- Hulton, C. S.; Seirafi, A.; Hinton, J. C.; Sidebotham, J. M.; Waddell, L.; Pavitt, G. D.; Owen-Hughes, T.; Spassky, A.; Buc, H.; Higgins, C. F. (1990). "Histone-like protein H1 (H-NS), DNA supercoiling, and gene expression in bacteria". Cell. 63 (3): 631–642. doi:10.1016/0092-8674(90)90458-Q. PMID 2171779. S2CID 44501388.
- Higgins, C. F.; Dorman, C. J.; Stirling, D. A.; Waddell, L.; Booth, I. R.; May, G.; Bremer, E. (1988). "A physiological role for DNA supercoiling in the osmotic regulation of gene expression in S. Typhimurium and E. Coli". Cell. 52 (4): 569–584. doi:10.1016/0092-8674(88)90470-9. PMID 2830029. S2CID 43197280.
- Newbury, S. F.; Smith, N. H.; Higgins, C. F. (1987). "Differential mRNA stability controls relative gene expression within a polycistronic operon". Cell. 51 (6): 1131–1143. doi:10.1016/0092-8674(87)90599-X. PMID 2446776. S2CID 2227781.
- Newbury, S. F.; Smith, N. H.; Robinson, E. C.; Hiles, I. D.; Higgins, C. F. (1987). "Stabilization of translationally active mRNA by prokaryotic REP sequences". Cell. 48 (2): 297–310. doi:10.1016/0092-8674(87)90433-8. PMID 2433046. S2CID 43061195.
- Stern, M. J.; Ames, G. F.; Smith, N. H.; Robinson, E. C.; Higgins, C. F. (1984). "Repetitive extragenic palindromic sequences: A major component of the bacterial genome". Cell. 37 (3): 1015–1026. doi:10.1016/0092-8674(84)90436-7. PMID 6378385. S2CID 34493605.

== Personal life ==
Higgins is not currently married, although he has been married twice. He has five daughters, two from his first marriage and three from the second.

Academic offices
Preceded by Sir Kenneth Calman	Warden and Vice-Chancellor of Durham University; 2007–September 2014	Succeeded by Stuart Corbridge
