= Pro-vice-chancellor =

Deputy to the vice-chancellor of a university

A pro-vice-chancellor (or pro vice-chancellor, PVC) or deputy vice-chancellor (DVC) is a deputy to the vice-chancellor of a university. In the older English universities, and Commonwealth universities following their tradition, PVCs were typically academics who took on additional managerial responsibilities for a limited time, alongside their regular teaching and research. However, in the newer English universities (e.g. those that originated as polytechnics), the post was usually a permanent one, and this is now the increasing trend among older universities also. Individual pro-vice-chancellors may be in charge of areas such as administration, research and development, student affairs, and academic and education affairs. In some universities, there are one or more deputy vice-chancellors subordinate to the vice-chancellor, with pro-vice-chancellor at an executive level ranking below deputy vice-chancellor. PVCs or DVCs are normally empowered to substitute for the vice-chancellor in both ceremonial and executive functions when the vice-chancellor is absent from the university.

In Scotland, the titles of deputy principal and senior deputy principal are used instead of pro vice-chancellor and deputy vice-chancellor. At the University of Stirling there is one senior deputy principal and three deputy principals. The number can vary depending on the needs of the university at any point in time, but remits usually cover, teaching and learning, research, graduate students and international affairs.

In the National University of Ireland, each president of the constituent universities (being University College Dublin, University College Cork, National University of Ireland, Galway and National University of Ireland, Maynooth), holds the title of pro-vice-chancellor of the NUI, though they generally only use this title at conferring ceremonies.

In the Australian Catholic University, there are three pro-vice-chancellors, each one responsible for both an area of academic affairs and a regional area. The University of New England, Australia also has three PVCs (two deans and another academic) and a deputy VC (research). In the Federation University Australia, there are five deputy vice-chancellors and one pro-vice chancellor.

In New Zealand universities, the term pro-vice-chancellor is sometimes used to denote senior executive positions equivalent to deans of colleges and schools in North American universities. In this case the term dean is normally reserved for academic administrative positions concerned with programmes and students. Most universities, however, use the term pro-vice-chancellor in the above sense. In Pakistan, Mehran University of Engineering and Technology is the only university which has a pro vice chancellor post.

== See also ==
- Lists of university leaders
