= History of Durham University =

Full seal of the university, featuring the coat of arms in the centre.

The history of Durham University spans over 190 years since it was founded by Act of Parliament. King William IV granted royal assent to the Act on 4 July 1832, and granted the university a royal charter on 1 June 1837, incorporating it and confirming its constitution. The university awarded its first degrees on 8 June 1837. It describes itself as the third-oldest university in England (a claim also made by UCL and the University of London) and is listed by the European University Association as one of Europe's oldest hundred universities in continuous operation.

From 1870, the university was divided between Durham and Newcastle upon Tyne, with a fully federal arrangement from 1910 which lasted until 1963 when the Newcastle division separated to become the University of Newcastle upon Tyne. From 1992, the university once again divided with a new campus in Stockton-upon-Tees, until 2017 when the university unified academic activities in Durham.

Durham University owns (as of 2006) a 227.8-hectare (563 acres) estate which includes a UNESCO World Heritage Site, one ancient monument (the Maiden Castle earthworks), five grade-one listed buildings and 68 Grade II listed buildings along with 44.9 ha (111 acres) of woodland.

== Origins ==
=== Medieval foundations and foundation attempts ===
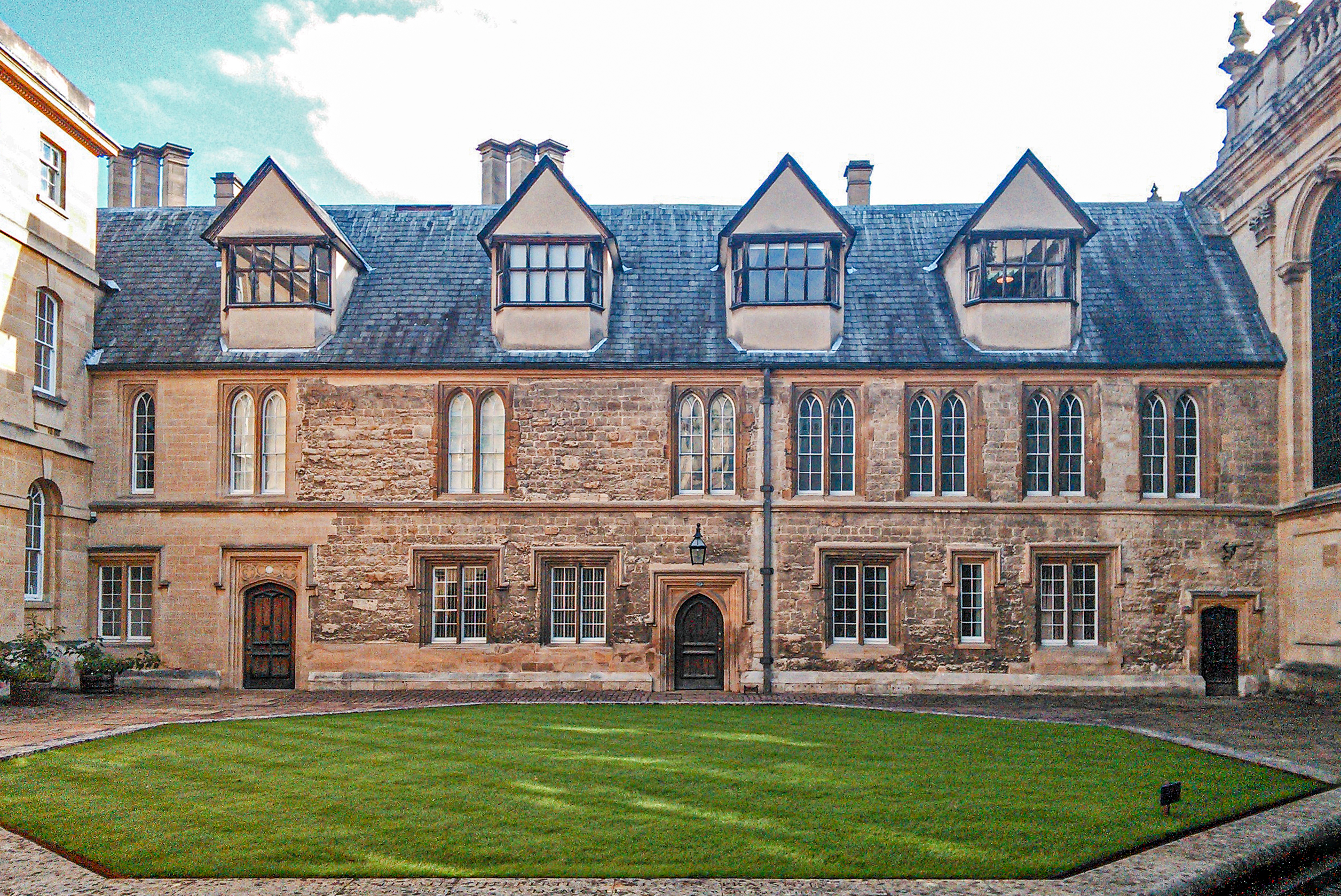
Surviving buildings of Durham College, Oxford

Durhamites had a central role in the development of higher education in England well before the formal establishment of Durham University. Archdeacon William of Durham established the first college in Oxford, 'Durham Hall' (now University College, Oxford), followed by John de Balliol who established the city's second college, Balliol College, shortly after. However, the direct involvement of Durham Cathedral with higher education dates back to the foundation c. 1286 of Durham Hall at Oxford, where the monks of Durham Abbey could go to study at the University of Oxford. This was endowed by Bishop Thomas Hatfield of Durham c. 1380 to become Durham College, Oxford, consisting of eight monks (one of whom served as Warden) and eight secular scholars. This college remained a cell of Durham Abbey rather than becoming an independent foundation. At the Reformation in 1540 it was dissolved and its revenues passed to the new dean and chapter of the reformed Durham Cathedral.

In 1541, Henry VIII proposed to use the funds of the dissolved college to found a northern University in Durham, but the plans were scaled down from a college with a provost and professors of divinity, Greek, Hebrew and medicine to a grammar school (Durham School) with a headmaster and an assistant master paid from Cathedral funds. There was a brief attempt to continue the college in Oxford as a secular foundation, but this lasted less than a year. The site was sold to Sir Thomas Pope in 1555 and used to found Trinity College, Oxford.

=== The Commonwealth foundation ===
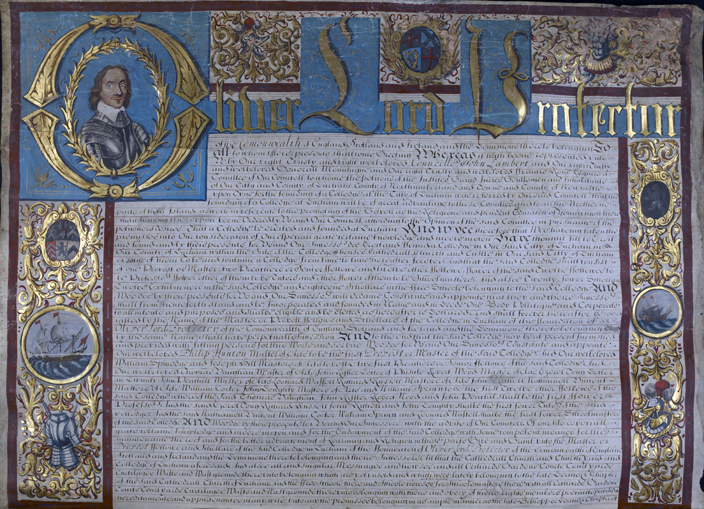
Letters issued by Oliver Cromwell on 15 May 1657 authorising a college in Durham

The next attempt to establish a university in Durham was under Oliver Cromwell. In 1649 the cathedrals of England were dissolved by Act of Parliament, leaving Durham Castle (the Bishop's palace), the cathedral and the college (the cathedral close) unoccupied. A number of petitions were presented to Cromwell, who in 1657 issued letters patent incorporating Durham College.

Philip Hunton was nominated as the provost, along with two preachers, four professors, four tutors, and four schoolmasters. The college was granted an endowment of lands formerly belonging to the cathedral, along with the buildings of the college and the cathedral library. However, the letters patent of 1657 did not give the college the powers of a university. A further petition was made to Cromwell in 1658, but nothing was done before he died.

In 1659 the universities of Oxford and Cambridge petitioned his successor, Richard Cromwell, against the foundation of a third university, and especially against any grant of degree-awarding powers. The college was also opposed by George Fox and other Quakers as being an institute designed to prepare ministers. According to Fowler, "on April 22 [Richard Cromwell] directed that a grant which had been drawn up to make the College a University should not be sealed until further order". The restoration of the monarchy in 1660 saw the cathedral chapter re-established and Durham College closed. However, the cause of education was not wholly forgotten, for Bishop John Cosin established his library on Palace Green a few years later, in 1669.

=== Origins of the 19th century university ===
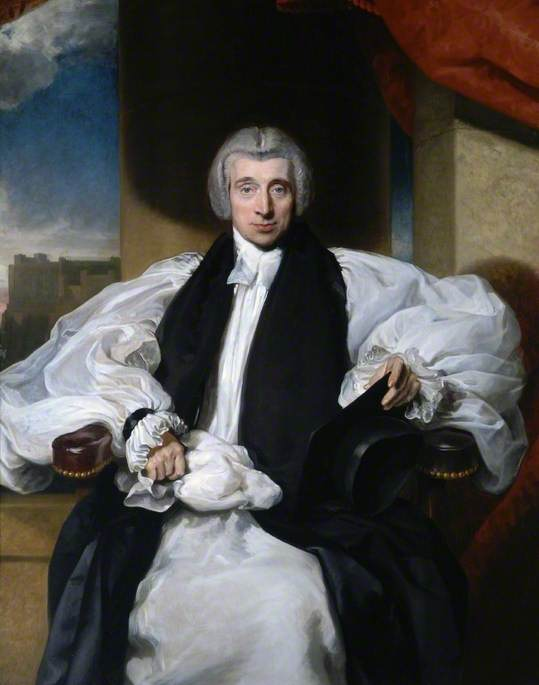
William Van Mildert, Bishop of Durham

In the first half of the 19th century, many elements came together. There was increasing interest in the theological training of the clergy, leading to the establishment of the private St Bees Theological College in west Cumberland in 1816 and St David's College, Lampeter in Wales in 1822 by Bishop Thomas Burgess, who was a prebendary of Durham. Burgess was succeeded as Bishop of St David's in 1825 by John Banks Jenkinson, who became Dean of Durham (in addition to his bishopric) in 1827. The secular University College London (UCL) was established in 1826: it was then operating under the name of London University, which had led to the foundation of the Anglican King's College London in 1829. In 1831 UCL had, like Cromwell's Durham College, had its attempt to gain University status blocked by Oxford and Cambridge, on the grounds that it wanted to offer degrees to people who were not members of the established church. A church university could not be opposed on these grounds, and schemes were drawn up in the late 1820s and 1830s for universities in York and Bath, both of which failed for lack of money. There were also threats that the Whig government elected in 1830 would seek to remove some of the wealth of the Church of England – of which Durham was one of the richest cathedrals – and that a UCL-like secular college would be established in Newcastle, as proposed by Thomas Greenhow in 1831 (this led to the foundation of the Newcastle upon Tyne School of Medicine and Surgery in 1834).

In summer 1831 the idea of founding a university at Durham was revived by Charles Thorp, a prebendary of Durham and domestic chaplain to Earl Grey, the prime minister (and from December 1831 Archdeacon of Durham). On 28 September the Chapter passed an Act officially founding "an academical institution" and by the end of the year this was being advertised as the University of Durham. In 1832 William van Mildert, the Bishop of Durham, introduced a bill in Parliament entitled "an Act to enable the Dean and Chapter of Durham to appropriate part of the property of their church to the establishment of a University in connection therewith". The two main effects of this bill were: (1) to establish a university as an eleemosynary (charitable) trust under the control of the Dean and Chapter of Durham as governors and trustees, and the Bishop of Durham as Visitor; (2) to allow part of the property of the cathedral to be used to support this university. The bill was passed with the support of Earl Grey's government, and received Royal Assent on 4 July 1832, which is taken as the date of the university's foundation.

== Early years, 1832–1846 ==
=== The opening of the university ===
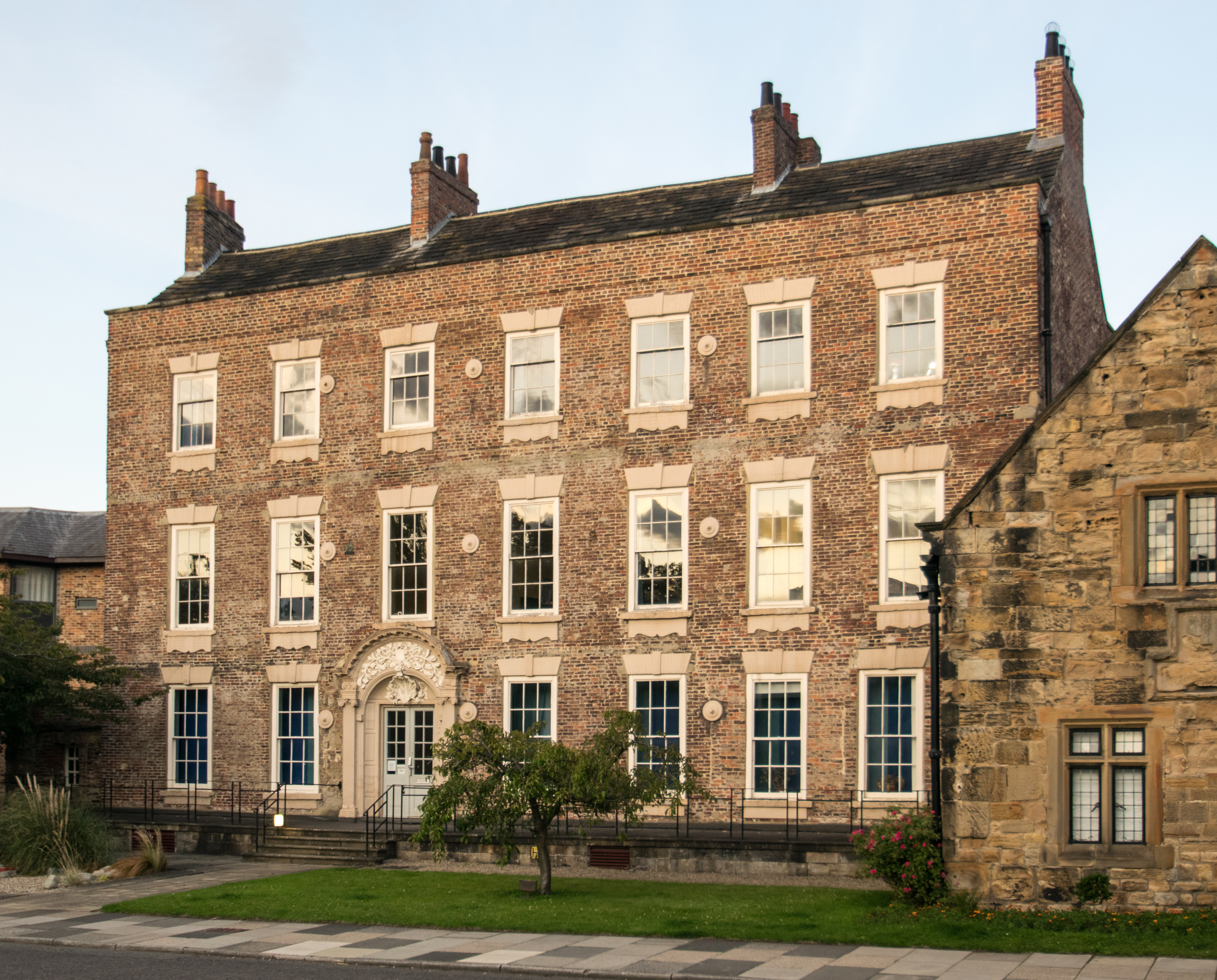
University House (now Cosin's Hall), the first home of the university

The university was intended from the start to be collegiate, and the foundation college was University College. This was originally accommodated in the former Archdeacon's Inn, renamed University House (now Cosin's Hall).

After the passing of the Act, a year was spent setting up the university and recruiting staff. The library was established in January 1833 by a donation of 160 volumes from Van Mildert, with the Bishop's librarian, Rev. Patrick George, being named the university's first librarian. The library was housed in a gallery of Cosin's Library on Palace Green. On 20 July the opening of the university in Michaelmas Term 1833 was announced, along with an almost complete list of staff.

The university opened on 28 October 1833 with 19 "scholars" and 18 "students" on the Bachelor of Arts course and 5 students on the theology licence course. The university was the first in England to introduce matriculation examinations, although these had been in use at the University of St Andrews and Marischal College, Aberdeen since the 1820s; the first student to be matriculated was John Cundill. Shortly after the first students arrived, the "first calendar" was published, advertising the institution as the "University of Durham founded by Act of Chapter with the Consent of the Bishop of Durham 28 September 1831. Constituted a University by Act of Parliament 2nd and 3rd William IV., Sess. 1831-2." The university had three professors (all Anglican clergymen) at its opening: Hugh James Rose (Divinity and Ecclesiastical History), Henry Jenkyns (Greek and Classical Literature) and John Carr (Mathematics). This reflected the two BA honours courses in classics and mathematics (following Oxford and Cambridge) and the course in theology, leading to the Licence in Theology (LTh). There were also readers in law (William Gray), medicine (William Cooke), history (Thomas Greenwood), natural philosophy (Charles Thomas Whitley) and moral philosophy (J. Miller), and lecturers in Modern languages (James Hamilton), and chemistry and mineralogy (James Finlay Weir Johnston, FRSE). Unlike at Oxford and Cambridge, where the teaching was carried out by the colleges, the professors at Durham were expected to "have the charge of the studies in their respective departments and work as at Glasgow and the foreign Universities, and as they did at Oxford in old times". (Note: Letter from Thorp to Van Mildert, 10 December 1831.)

Unfortunately, Carr died suddenly on 30 October, only two days after the university opened. The university went into mourning for fourteen days. George, the librarian, died on 13 January 1834, Whitley taking over that role in addition to his readership. Rose was also plagued by ill health and left in March. He became the second principal of King's College London in 1836 but again only lasted around six months before ill health forced him from the post; he died in 1838 aged 43. After he left Durham, his brother, Henry John Rose, filled in for the rest of the academic year, before returning to his fellowship at Cambridge.

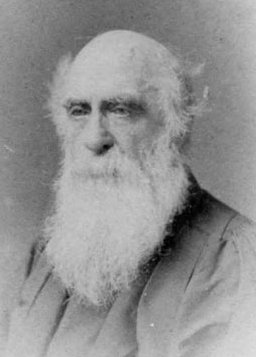
Temple Chevallier, first professor of mathematics

Jenkyns took over as acting professor of divinity, while remaining professor of Greek until 1839, when he was appointed professor of Greek permanently and made a canon of the cathedral. Temple Chevallier came to Durham in 1834 to assist Jenkyns with the teaching of theology and Hebrew, and was appointed professor of mathematics, reader in Hebrew and Registrar to the university in 1835.

In early 1834, Thorp wrote to the bishops of the Church of England asking if they would accept holders of Durham degrees for ordination alongside those from Oxford and Cambridge. The answers were mostly positive, with only two bishops refusing: George Murray (bishop of Rochester) and Henry Phillpotts (bishop of Exeter and a canon of Durham Cathedral). At the end of the 1833–34 academic year, George Selby Thomson became the first recipient of the LTh, which was available with only one year's study for those with degrees from Oxford, Cambridge, Dublin or Durham (as opposed to three years' study for non-graduates). Thomson had gained his BA at Jesus College, Cambridge and took his MA in June 1834.

There was originally an intention to offer a medical course similar to those at the London colleges, leading to the Licence of the Society of Apothecaries. However, there was insufficient demand to sustain the course, particularly after the opening of the medical school in Newcastle (1834), and lectures in medicine stopped after 1836.

In March 1834, Thorp received a letter from John Burder, the Bishop's London secretary, checking whether the proceedings regarding the university in Chapter were in writing under their common seal and with the Bishop's signature, Following this, an Act of Chapter on 4 April 1834 resolved "that the College established by Act of Chapter, 28th September 1831, be constituted a University". On 9 May 1835 the university took legal advice on the extent of its powers under the 1832 act, and in particular whether it could grant degrees. It was then announced on 13 June 1835 that the university would confer degrees and that a fundamental statute would be drawn up for the university. This fundamental statute was passed by the dean and chapter on 20 July 1835; it established the University Senate and Convocation, explicitly allowed the university to grant degrees (stating "that the degrees in the various faculties shall be conferred by the Warden in Convocation"), limited degrees to members of the established church, and gave the Senate (subject to the approval of Convocation) the right to make further regulations.

The statement that the university would grant degrees and the publication of the statutes led to a letter to the York Herald accusing the university of deceit in claiming the right to offer degrees without actually possessing that right, and claiming that students had been transferred to Oxford because "when the time for degrees grew near, not a degree could the Durhamites confer". A response in the Durham Advertiser from "Dunelmensis" pointed out that "[t]he time for conferring degrees has not yet arrived" and that therefore the supposed lack of any right to confer degrees was purely the opinion of the writer of the original letter, without any evidence to back it up.

The first Convocation was held on 4 March 1836 to approve the regulations for the university, a second meeting the following week approved the appointment of examiners. The 1836 Convocation consisted of 84 graduates (doctors or MAs) of Oxford, Cambridge and Dublin who had become members of the University of Durham, including John Keble and John Henry Newman.

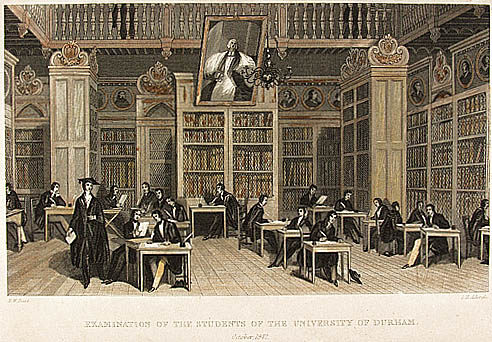
An examination taking place in Cosin's Library in 1842

The first final degree examinations were held in Easter term, 1836, although following the practice of Oxford at the time the students would not receive their degrees for another year. The examinations in 1836 saw Durham introduce the use of external examiners to ensure comparability of its degrees with those of Oxford and Cambridge. This marked the start of the system of external examination that spread throughout British higher education and is still used today. John Cundill became the first Durham student to gain first class honours, in mathematics, although he missed out on a double first, taking second class honours in classics.

At this last examination, by the assistance of Examiners from Oxford, the same standard of attainments has been fixed for a certificate, which is observed on the like occasion in that University.

— Durham University Calendar 1844

On 21 February 1836, Van Mildert died. The funding for the university was not yet fully established – Van Mildert had been supporting it with £2,000 a year from his own income and had been working to get prebendal stalls attached to the professorships of divinity and classics and to the wardenship, but this was in the hands of the Ecclesiastical Commissioners and not yet decided. He had also allowed the university the use of Durham Castle, but this again was not yet settled. Thirdly, the royal charter to incorporate the university was not yet granted. There was also a fear that the Whig government, now under Lord Melbourne, would appoint a liberal bishop who might not support the idea of the exclusively Anglican university.

The new bishop was named as Edward Maltby, a liberal and supporter of UCL who had read the prayer at the laying of its foundation stone (and, from its foundation in November 1836, a senator of the University of London). Before he was installed, the petition for the royal charter was submitted. On the legal advice of Sir Charles Wetherell, it contained no explicit mention of degree awarding powers, only incorporation and the right to hold property.

However, the charter was delayed by Lord Russell, the Home Secretary, after the fee had been paid for sealing the charter, due to Durham degrees not being open to non-Anglicans. With the time set for the conferring of degrees approaching, there were fears that, while the university believed it had the power to grant degrees under the 1832 act, objections would be made and the public perception of the degrees would be affected. Nevertheless, the intention was to grant degrees whether or not the charter was sealed in time.

=== The royal charter ===
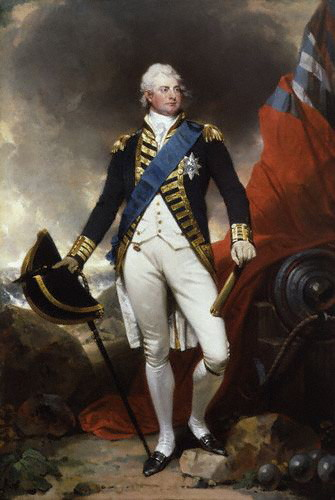
King William IV granted Durham University its royal charter in 1837

In the event, Maltby "heartily entered into the scheme for the Durham University", and with his support the university's royal charter was granted on 1 June 1837 by William IV, incorporating "The Warden, Masters and Scholars of the University of Durham". While, following Wetherell's advice, this did not include explicit degree awarding powers, it stated that the fundamental statute passed by the dean and chapter (as governors of the university) in 1835 was "by virtue, and in pursuance of the trusts and powers in the said Act of Parliament, and of every other power enabling them in that behalf" and also that the university "shall have and enjoy all the property, rights, and privileges which are assured by the said Act [the University of Durham Act 1832] to the university therein contemplated and authorised; or are incident to a University established by our Royal Charter". The charter did not create a new institution but rather confirmed Durham's status as a university.

The first students graduated a week after the grant of the charter, on 8 June 1837. At the same congregation the charter was accepted and the original seal of the university adopted (a St Cuthbert's cross in a circle, the coat of arms not then having been granted). The first honorary degree was awarded the Earl Grey in 1838.

The examination period of 1837 saw the first examinations for the MA. This was a break with the tradition of the ancient universities, where the Oxbridge MA had come to be awarded on payment of a fee to all BAs of the required standing. Durham, by contrast, required a further year of study and the passing of an examination.

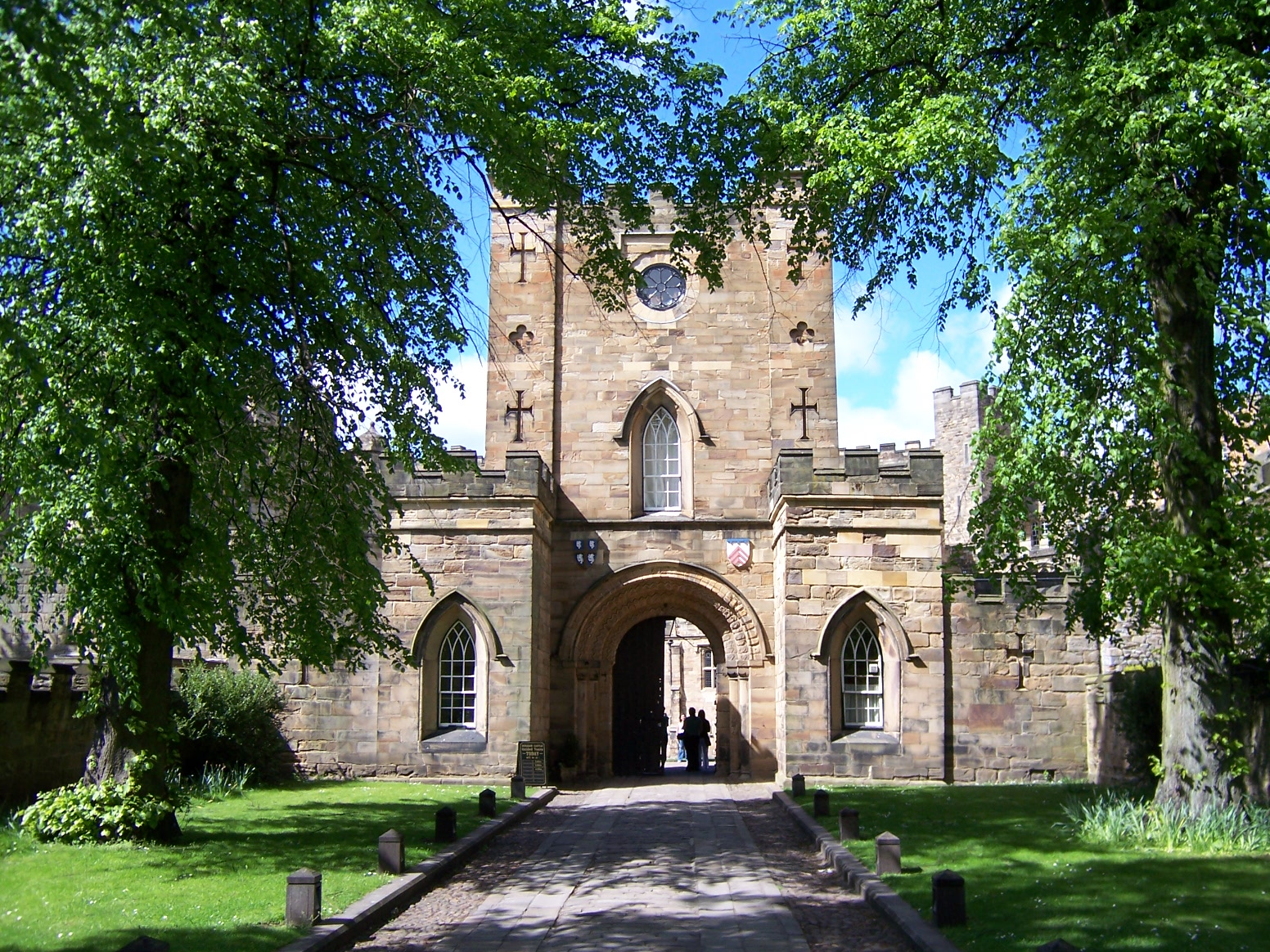
Durham Castle, granted to the university in 1837

On 19 July 1837, Queen Victoria, by an order of the Queen-in-Council, granted the use of Durham Castle, previously a palace of the Bishop of Durham, to the university. University College moved into the castle, however the keep was ruinous and needed substantial reconstruction before it could be occupied. In the course of this renovation, the skeleton of a whale was discovered in the castle ruins, and a report on this made at the 1839 meeting of the British Association. It was originally claimed that these were the remains of a whale cast up on the shore of Co. Durham in 1661 and acquired by Bishop Cosin. It was later admitted that the letter on which this claim was based was a forgery.

1837 also saw the university found the first course in engineering at any university institution in England, which opened in January 1838, led by Chevallier and Johnston. While it was initially popular, with admissions exceeding those for Arts or Theology in 1839/40, this did not last. The course was too expensive for students and although leading industrialists supported it, employers did not give any credit for it; it closed a few years later due to falling student numbers, the last students being admitted in 1851.

Johnston was elected a Fellow of the Royal Society on 15 June 1837. His sponsors included Charles Wheatstone and Michael Faraday. On 30 May 1839, Thorp was also elected a Fellow, his sponsors including Bishop Maltby (signing E. Dunelm, as Bishop of Durham), as well as William Tooke, one of the founders of UCL, and Leonard Horner, UCL's first Warden.

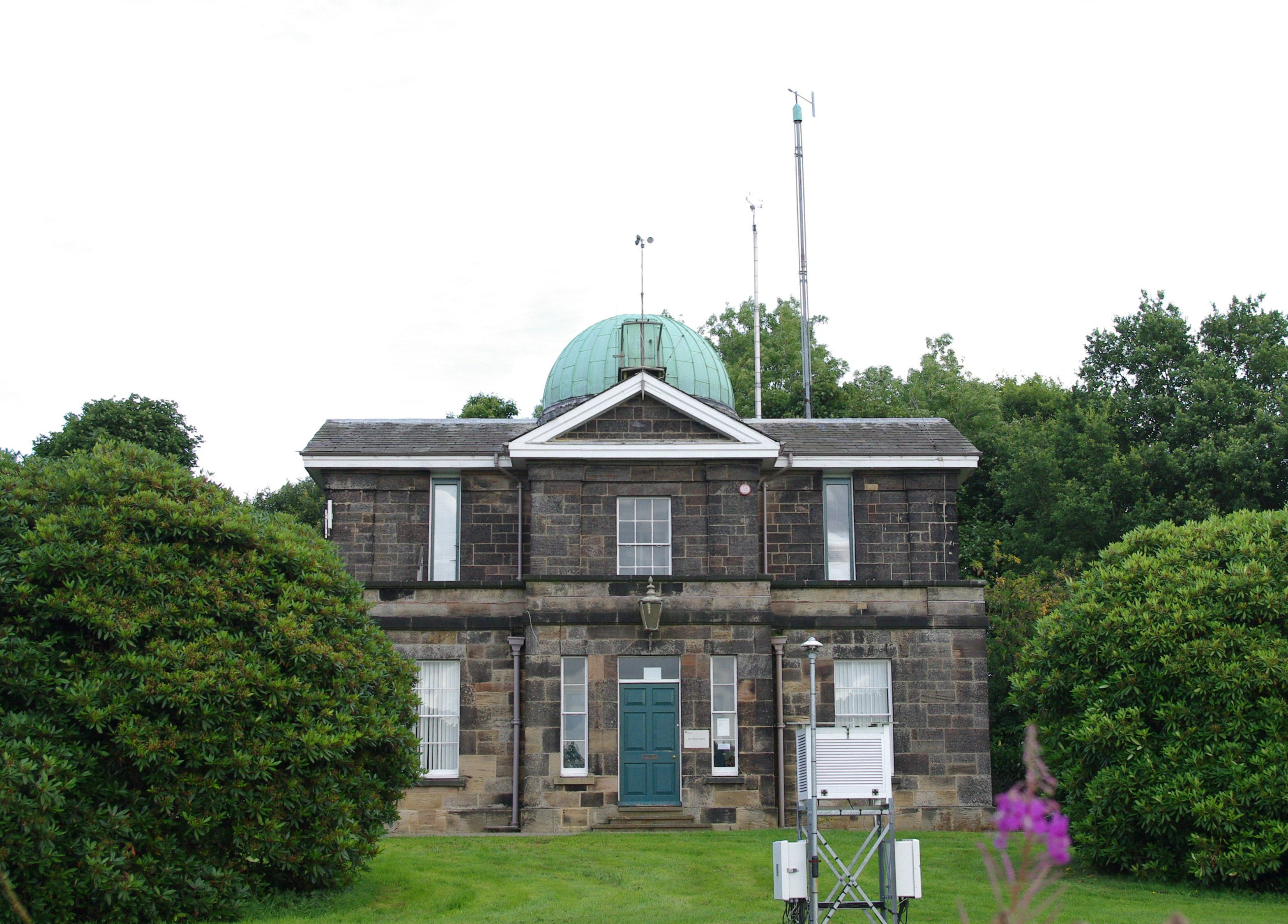
Durham University observatory

In 1839 the Durham University Observatory was established. This opened in 1842 with an 8-foot (2.44 m) focal length equatorial-mount refractor with a 6.5 inch (17 mm) primary, built by H. Fraunhofer. This was used, in particular, for sunspot observations through the 19th century, as well as for observations of minor planets and comets.

1839 also saw Thorp involved in establishing a diocesan teacher training college for men (later to be St Bede's College, now the College of St Hild and St Bede), with the first Master being John Cundill. This was originally proposed to be part of the university, and the dean and chapter approved a scheme in 1836, but this did not prove practical. The college opened in Framwellgate Moor in 1841 before moving to Leazes Road in 1847.

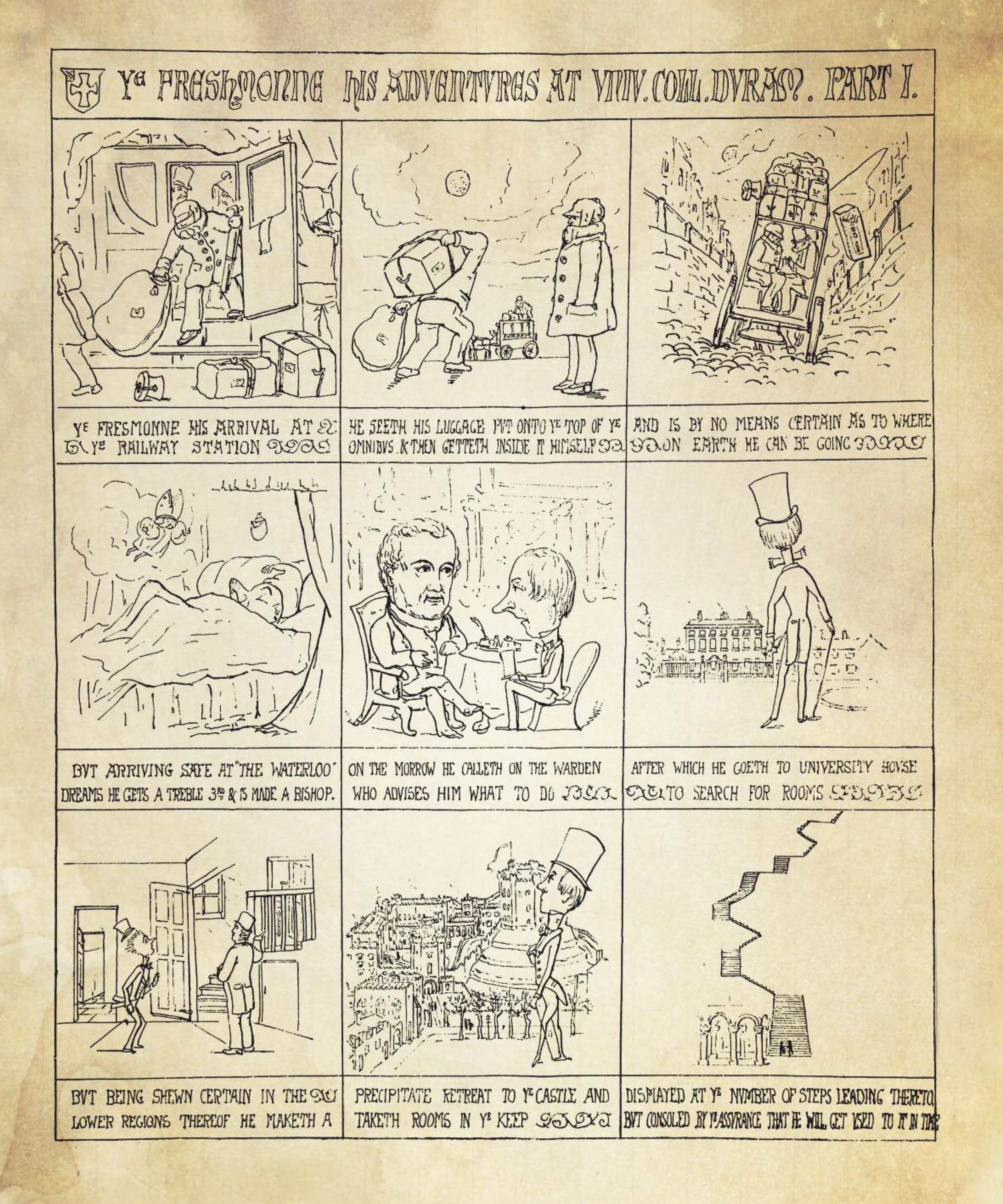
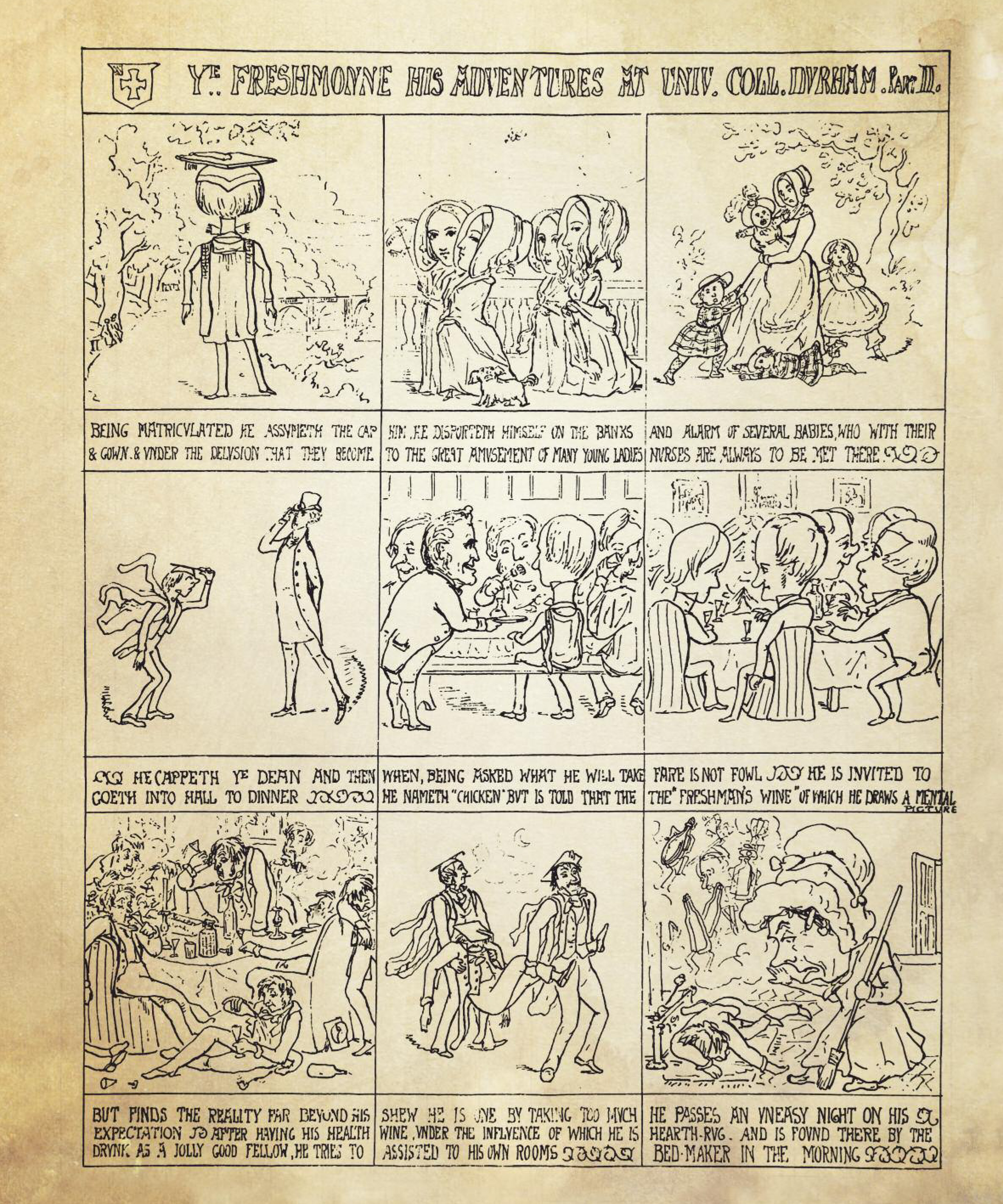
Ye Freshmonne His Adventures at Univ. Coll. Durham, a contemporary cartoon of student life in the 1840s by Edward Bradley (Univ Coll 1845-8)

On 4 June 1841 a further Order in Council transferred further estates to the university and attached canonries to the professorships of Divinity and Greek, while the professor of mathematics (Chevallier) was made the professor of mathematics and astronomy. The wardenship of the university was (after the term of the current Warden, Charles Thorp) to be held ex officio by the Dean of Durham, the revenues freed up to be used to establish a professorship in Hebrew. Three weeks after this order was made, John Edwards was appointed professor of Greek, the office having been vacant since Jenkyns' appointment as professor of divinity in 1839.

On 18 May 1843 the university received a grant of arms:

Argent, a Cross Patee quadrate Gules; a Canton Azure, charged with a Cheveron Or between three Lions rampant of the First, together with this Motto 'Fundamenta ejus super montibus Sanctis,'

— J. T. Fowler, Durham University; earlier foundations and present colleges, quoting the official grant

These are alternatively described (bringing out the origin of the various elements) as "Argent S. Cuthbert's cross (formée quadrate) gules; on a canton the arms of Bishop Hatfield: Azure, a chevron or, between three lions rampant argent". It is interesting that Bishop Hatfield, the founder of Durham College, Oxford, is commemorated in the arms rather than Bishop Van Mildert. This was not the only attempt to draw a link between the college and the university. In an undated letter to "Mr Grey" (not the Earl), Thorp wrote:

The university is the legitimate successor of Durham College, the property of which remained since the reformation in the hands of the Chapter and which successive Governments from Henry VIII downwards have proposed to apply to academic education at Durham.

— Charles Thorp, 1st Warden of Durham University

Early university calendars also contained a note setting out the link between the college and the university. It is worth noting also that the head of the mediaeval Durham College was its Warden, the same title assumed by Thorp as head of the new university.

=== Sports and societies ===
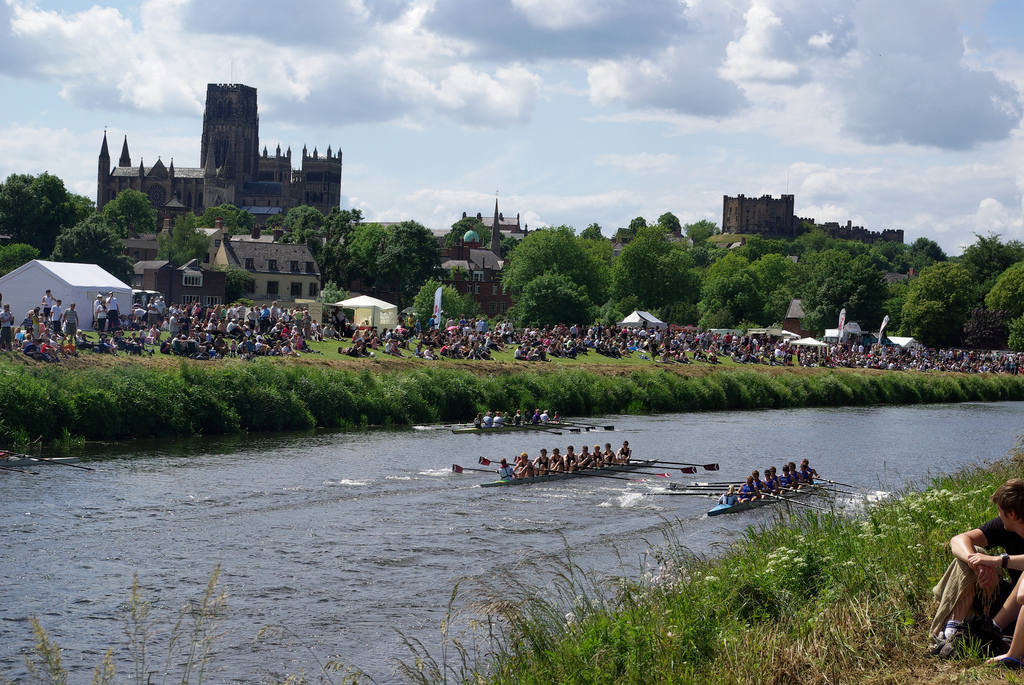
Durham Regatta

1834 saw the foundation of the Durham Regatta, the second oldest in the country. The university was one of the founding members of the Regatta, along with Durham School and Durham Boat Club. The university was represented by a crew from University College Boat Club in the six-oared Sylph, losing to W. L. Wharton's Velocity in the first race of the Regatta, on 17 June.

The first debating society in Durham was founded in 1835. However, this appears to have closed by 1839. In 1842, the Durham University Union debating society was established. It was later revived in 1872–73, when it took the name of the Durham Union Society and moved to Palace Green.

The university played its earliest recorded cricket match away at Sunderland on 17 June 1842, the result being a 58 run victory for the university. The first home cricket match at the Racecourse was played in 1843, again against Sunderland. The oldest recorded scorecard at the Racecourse, from 2 June 1843, is for a drawn two-innings one-day match against Bishopwearmouth. As Bishopwearmouth is part of Sunderland, this may have been the same match.

== Growth, crisis and revival, 1846–1909 ==
=== New colleges in Durham ===
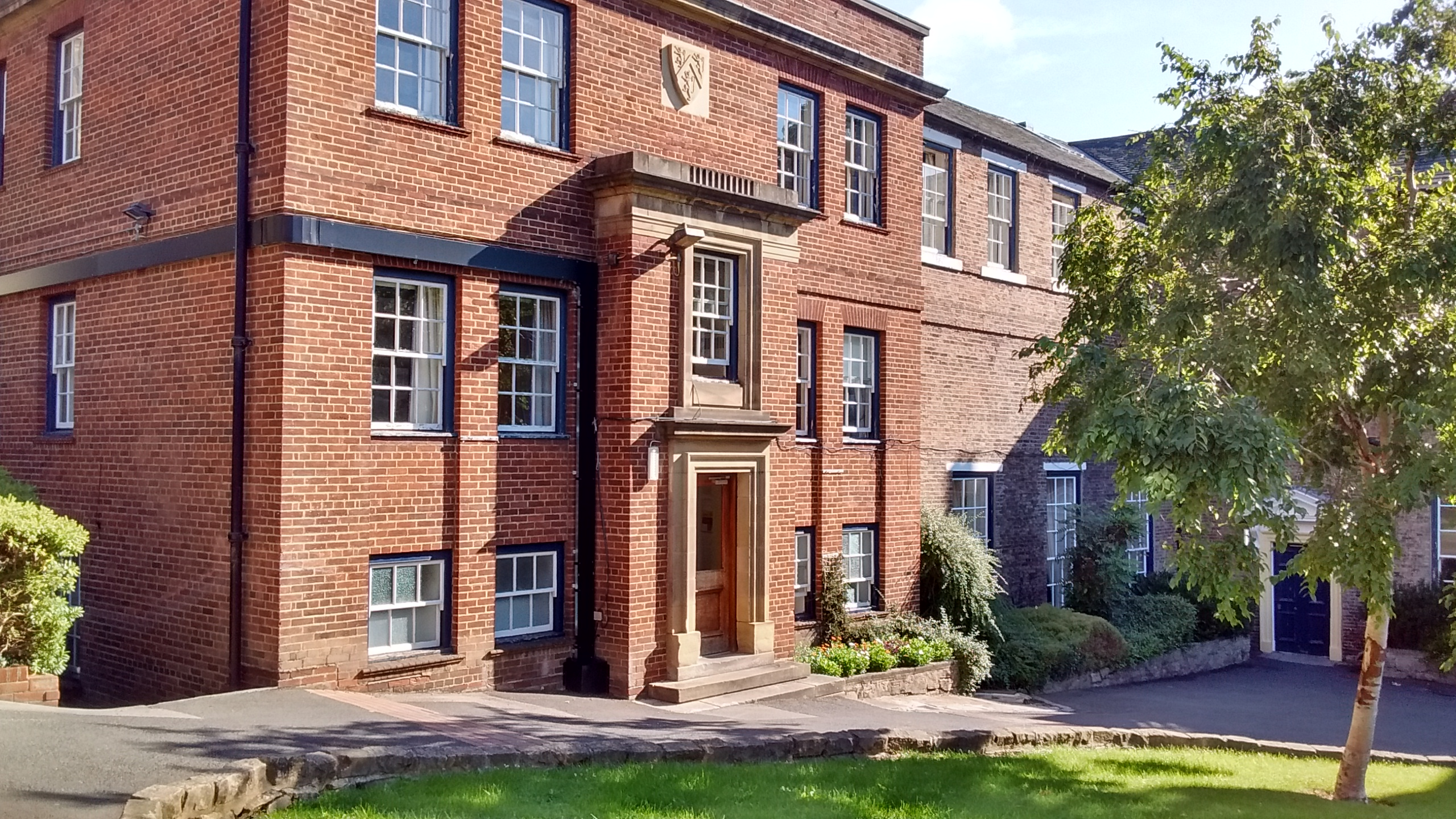
Bishop Hatfield's Hall, now Hatfield College

In 1846, Bishop Hatfield's Hall (later to become Hatfield College) was founded with the idea of providing more economical accommodation for students. While University College had followed the system of the Oxbridge colleges, where students were expected to furnish their own rooms, employ their own servants, and buy their own food, David Melville, the first Master of Hatfield, proposed a "model college" based on three principles:

- All rooms were let furnished, with shared servants
- All meals were taken in Hall, communally provided
- Commons were to be fixed at a reasonable rate, known in advance.

This system was discussed by the royal commission on the University of Oxford in 1852, who rejected it on the grounds that cheaper halls would provide worse tuition. The idea was, however, taken up by Keble College, Oxford on its foundation in 1870, and has since spread throughout the world.

Melville was determined to create a brand new concept of student living and learning which would both meet the increasing demand for places and at the same time provide access to a university education for people of limited means. His dream became a reality and the model has been replicated across the world – there is a strong argument to say that university halls of residence as we know them today started in Hatfield College, Durham!

— Tim Burt, Master of Hatfield College, quoted by Collegiate Way

Hatfield's original building had been a coaching inn (the Red Lyon) in the 17th and 18th centuries. The college soon outgrew this and a new building (now the Melville building) was built in 1849 and a chapel was added in 1853. 1851 saw the addition of a third College, Bishop Cosin's Hall, occupying University House on Palace Green (the old Archdeacon's Inn) where University College had first been based.

The new colleges and University College were all owned by the university, rather than (like the colleges at Oxford and Cambridge) being independent corporations. This has since been held up as an easier template for new collegiate foundations to follow than Oxbridge, and was the model used in establishing York, Lancaster and Kent as collegiate universities and in establishing residential colleges at US universities.

Until the founding of Hatfield, the university and University College had been coextensive. This now changed, making it explicit that the teaching in Durham was carried out by the university, not (as in Oxford, Cambridge and London) partly by the colleges. This was not an innovation as such – it had been the older system at Oxford and Cambridge, who had been attacked around the time of Durham's foundation for abandoning it. The University Cricket Club was established in 1846, making it clear that it represented the whole University, but Hatfield established its own Boat Club – which claims to have existed from 1846, although the first intercollegiate race was not held until 1854.

In 1858, a diocesan teacher training college for women (later St Hild's College) opened on the Leazes Road site, next to the men's college.

=== Academic dress ===
In the 1850s the academic hoods were recorded as being:

- LTh: Black stuff trimmed with velvet
- BA: Black silk or bombazine, lined with white wool or fur
- MA: Black, lined with Palatinate purple or lilac silk
- LLD: Scarlet cloth lined with white silk
- MB: Purple cloth bound with white fur
- MD: Purple cloth with scarlet silk lining
- MusD: Purple cloth lined with white silk
- BD: Entirely black, corded silk
- DD: Scarlet, lined with Palatinate purple.

=== The medical college ===
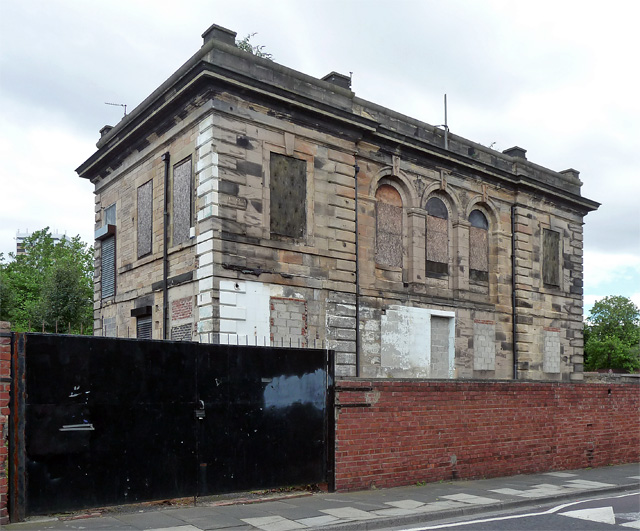
Former Barber Surgeons' Hall, Newcastle, which housed the College of Medical and Practical Science from 1851 and later the College of Medicine and Surgery

In June 1851 the Newcastle upon Tyne School of Medicine and Surgery, which had opened on 1 October 1834, split into two following internal disagreements: the Newcastle upon Tyne College of Medicine and Surgery (supported by the majority of staff), and the Newcastle upon Tyne College of Medicine and Practical Science. Discussions between the university and the School of Medicine and Surgery had been in progress at the time of the split, and were renewed in October with the College of Medicine and Surgery, against vigorous opposition from the College of Medicine and Practical Science. On 17 December 1851, the College of Medicine and Surgery became the "Newcastle upon Tyne College of Medicine, in connection with the University of Durham", this being approved by Convocation on 27 January 1852.

The statutes of the university were amended on 20 November 1854 to remove religious tests from degrees, except those in arts and divinity, thus allowing degrees in medicine to be granted without religious distinction, although a religious test was still imposed on members of Convocation.

Medical connections were not made only with Newcastle. The medical schools of two Anglican colleges, King's College London and Queen's College, Birmingham, were also affiliated to the university, allowing their students to obtain Durham degrees.

The first Licences in Medicine were granted in 1856. In 1857 the College of Medicine and Practical Science merged back into the College of Medicine, and in 1858 the first University examinations for the Bachelor of Medicine degree were held, with external examiners from Oxford and London. Durham was included in the Medical Act 1858 with the same status as the universities of Oxford, Cambridge and London.

=== The Commission of 1861 ===
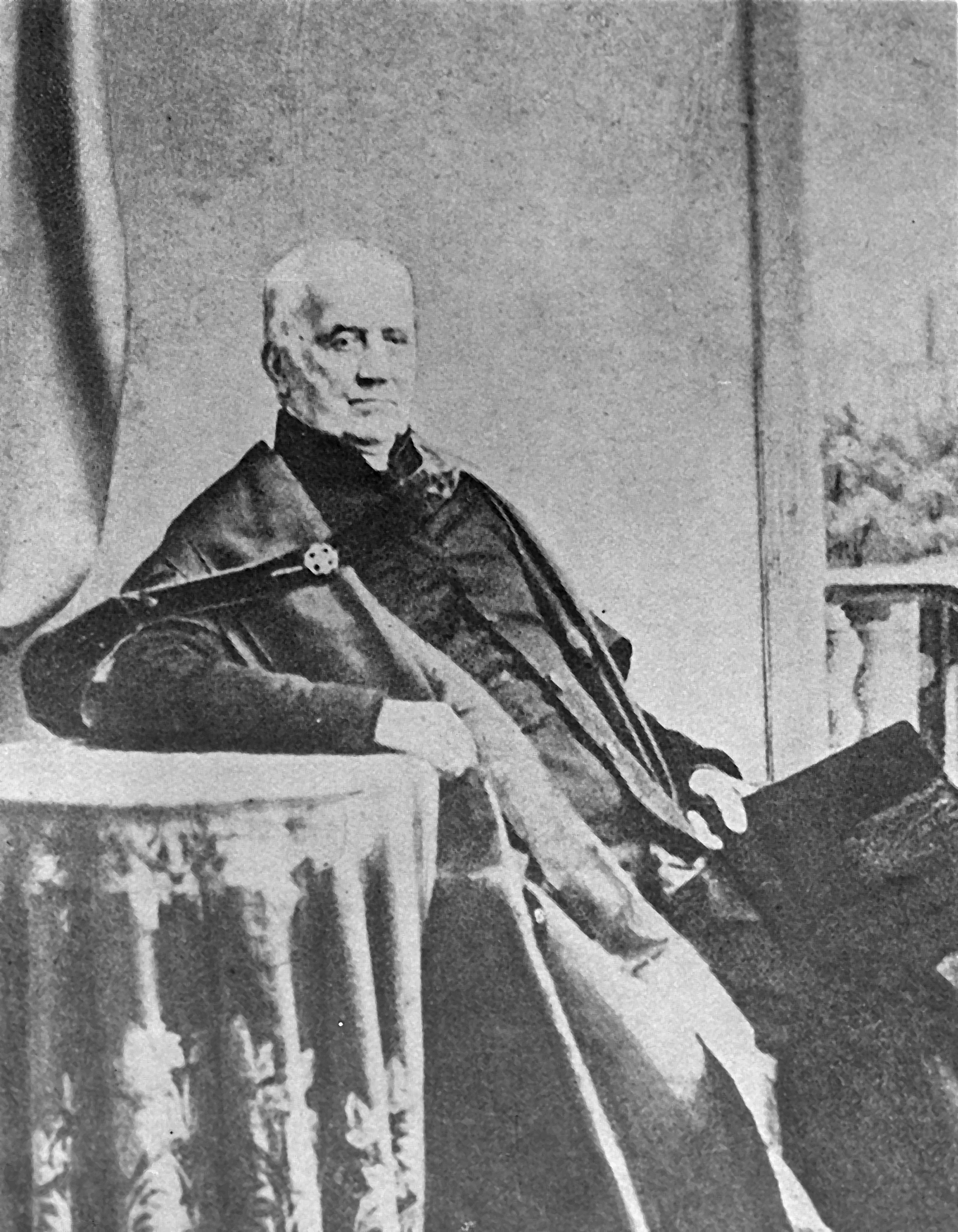
Charles Thorp, Archdeaon of Durham and first warden of the university

The number of students in the university had peaked at 130 in the early 1850s and by 1861 had fallen to 46. The university was in crisis, and a commission was set up by Act of Parliament in 1861 to look into it. Modern analysis has shown that much of this crisis was due to a stagnation in demand for higher education between the 1820s and the 1860s which, coupled with growth at Oxford and Cambridge, affected all of the newer institutions.

One problem identified by the commission was Thorp, who ran the university as his private fiefdom. Melville, who had been dismissed as master of Hatfield in 1851, told the commission that:

during the whole of my experience there, I should say the Dean and Chapter were simply managed, the Convocation was simply dictated to, and the Senate simply checkmated; that is the Constitution of the University of Durham

— David Melville, Report of the Durham University Commissioners

The commission reported back in June 1862, recommending that the government of the university be removed from the dean and chapter and transferred to the senate, that a school of science be created, in which degrees in science would be awarded (the first science degrees in Britain having been awarded just two years earlier in 1860 by the University of London), that the BA course be shortened to two years, and that arts degrees be opened to non-Anglicans. This was opposed by the dean and chapter, and the Privy Council rejected the recommendations. Thorp, now quite elderly, offered to retire, although he died in October 1862 before this could come into effect.

Thorp had been warden since 1831 and master of University College since its opening. On his death, the Dean of Durham, as specified by the 1841 Order in Council, became warden ex officio. The sub-warden, which had been a rotating position, became permanent and eventually evolved into the vice-chancellor. University College gained a separate master.

Despite rejecting the commission's recommendations, the dean and chapter proceeded to implement virtually all of them – except for their giving up control. New statutes in 1865 removed religious tests from all qualifications except licences and degrees in theology, although membership of Convocation remained closed to non-Anglicans until after the Universities Tests Act 1871. The residence required for the BA degree was reduced to two years – although a "Student's Guide to the University of Durham" in 1880 recommended that, although it was possible to gain a pass degree in two years, "Candidates for honours should, if possible, allow themselves three years for the whole course". The length of the academic year was also increased from 6 months to 8. Bishop Cosin's Hall closed as a separate College in 1864, being merged into University College.

In order to give graduates of the university a voice, the Durham University Society (now the Dunelm Society) was formed in London as an independent alumni association. It held its first meeting on 31 May 1866.

=== The College of Physical Sciences ===
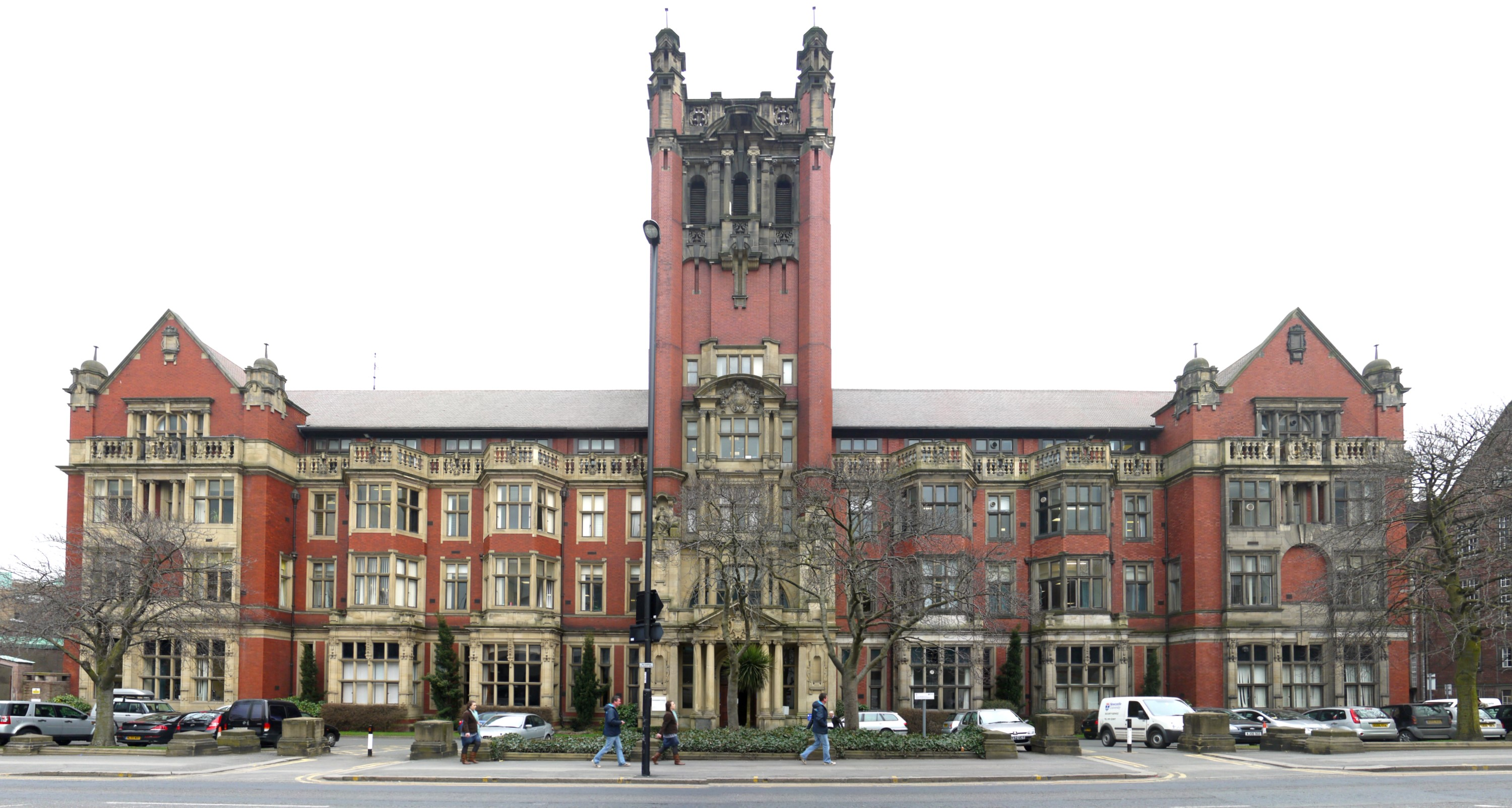
The College of Physical Sciences, now the Armstrong Building of Newcastle University

An attempt was made to establish a school of sciences at Durham in 1865, but this came to nothing. In 1870 the Newcastle College of Medicine became a college of the university as the Durham University College of Medicine. It gained representation on the senate, and residence in the college now counted as residence in the university – so it was no longer necessary to live in Durham for a period to gain a degree.

In 1871 the university and the North of England Institute of Mining and Mechanical Engineers, led by Nicholas Wood, established the College of Physical Sciences in Newcastle upon Tyne. £20,000 was raised by public subscription, and the university made an annual grant of £1,000, covering the salaries of professors in mathematics and physics. It originally granted the non-degree title of Associate in Science. The college was formally incorporated into the university in 1874, gaining the right to award the BSc and have representation in the Senate. The MSc (granting membership of Convocation) was added in 1878, and the DSc in 1882. (Note: Fowler gives dates of 1878 and 1882 in Chapter 2; Chapter 8 on the College of Science, by G. A. Labour, gives dates of 1881 and 1888)

The College of Physical Sciences was the second provincial university college to be established, after Owens College in Manchester. From the start in 1871, the lecture and laboratory courses of the college were open to women, who were able to take the non-degree ASc but could not (at that time) proceed to degrees. However, the first women did not actually enter until 1880, when Isabel Aldis won an exhibition at the college.

In 1883 the College of Physical Sciences was incorporated as a company under the name of the Durham College of Science. In 1886 land was acquired in Lax's Gardens for new buildings; construction started in 1887 with Sir W. G. Armstrong (later Lord Armstrong) laying the foundation stone and the college moving to the new site in 1888. In 1889, the College of Science was one of 11 university colleges to be awarded funding through the "Grant to University Colleges in Great Britain". 1886 also saw the college establish the first chair of mining in England, filled by John Herman Merivale who had been the college's first student 15 years earlier.

The curriculum was also expanded, with the School of Art merging into the college and the introduction of humanities subjects leading to the BLitt and DLitt from 1895 (the BA remaining limited to those studying at the Durham colleges). At the College of Medicine degrees of Bachelor and Doctor of Hygiene (BHy and DHy) were introduced in 1891 and a diploma in public health in 1894. Unlike the Durham colleges, the two colleges in Newcastle were engaged in teaching and employed their own professors.

In 1904 the Durham College of Science was renamed Armstrong College in honour of Lord Armstrong, whose friends and admirers raised £50,000 for the college after his death, to be used to complete the buildings, on condition that the name be changed.

=== Growth in Durham ===
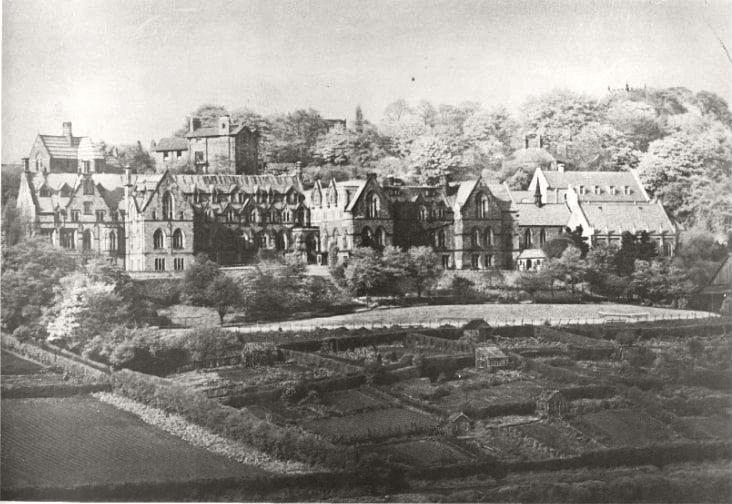
St Hild's College

Back in Durham, "unattached" mature students were admitted from 1870: these were non-resident students who were not associated with a college. In 1888 the unattached students founded St Cuthbert's Society. The men's teacher training college (named St Bede's College from 1886) was affiliated to the university from 1892, while the women's teacher training college was affiliated from 1896, in which year it was also renamed St Hild's College.

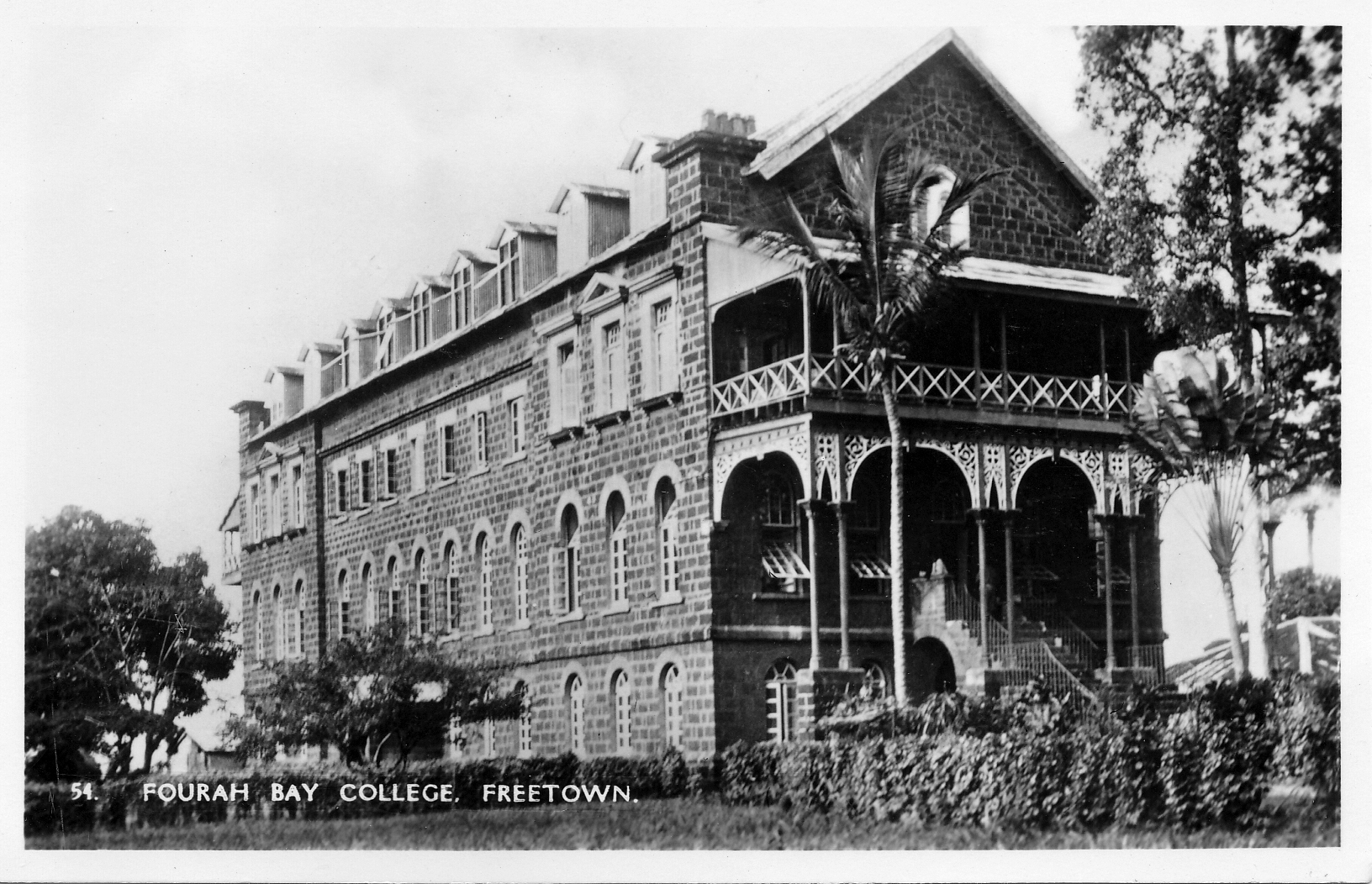
Fourah Bay College, Sierra Leone

The university also formed overseas links with two Anglican institutions: Codrington College in Barbados in 1875 and Fourah Bay College in Sierra Leone in 1876. Via the latter of these, Durham awarded what was probably the first BA in Africa to Nathaniel Davis in 1878. The Times said "it would not be much longer before the University of Durham was affiliated to the Zoo", and although Durham was proud of what it was doing, the reaction in Sierra Leone was more mixed:

it will be no little credit to the University of Durham for history to have to record that she was the first to throw open to Africa the full privileges of a liberal education.'

— Durham University Journal, 1876

The affiliation of FBC to Durham University elicited mixed reactions. On the one hand, it provided FBC with the prestige of conferring a British degree. On the other hand, it fell far short of being a West African university staffed with African faculty capable of addressing and embracing West African language, tradition and culture. … Amidst strong demands for a truly West African university, the affiliation was a compromise.

— Daniel J. Paracka Jr., The Athens of West Africa

Also in 1876 the university passed regulations allowing the affiliation of theological colleges, allowing students who obtained their licences to proceed to a Durham BA with only 1 year of residence and only sitting the final examination. Affiliated colleges in 1882 were: St Aidan's College, Birkenhead, St Augustine's College, Canterbury, St Bees Theological College, Chichester Theological College, Cumbrae Theological College, Edinburgh Theological College, Gloucester Theological College, Highbury Theological College, Lichfield Theological College, Lincoln Theological College, St Boniface Missionary College, Warminster, and the theological departments of King's College London and Queen's College, Birmingham.

In 1882, the university celebrated its golden jubilee with the award of forty honorary degrees, including a DD for John Cundill, the installation of a stained glass window designed by C E. Kempe in the great hall of the castle, a concert, and services in the cathedral, where Bishop Lightfoot preached.

For many years, attendance at the Sunday morning service at the Cathedral was compulsory.

=== Women students ===
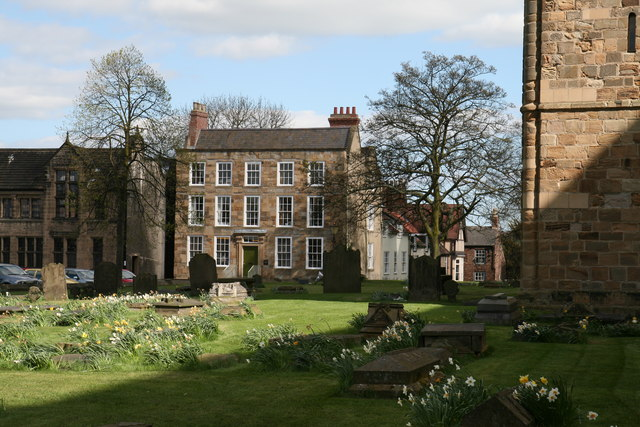
Abbey House, Palace Green, home of the Women's Hostel from 1901

The university had originally voted to admit women in 1881, only three years after London had done so. However, implementation was delayed by disputes over who would pay for a women's college – the university did not have the money, and (unlike at Oxford and Cambridge) private backers were not forthcoming. A further blow was dealt in 1886 when the university sought a legal opinion and discovered it did not have the right under its current charter to grant degrees to women.

Women were, however, allowed to study at the College of Science from its opening in 1871, although the first women did not enter until 1880, and it had over thirty women students by 1893. The situation was allowed to rest for a while, until in 1892 Ella Bryant passed the BSc examination with second class honours in physics. In June 1893 she tried to pay the fee for the BSc degree, but was refused. The university applied for a supplemental charter "almost immediately" after this, allowing it to grant degrees to women in all subjects but divinity, and it was granted in 1895. Bryant received her BSc on 24 June 1895, becoming the first woman to receive a degree from Durham.

The first women to matriculate in Durham itself were three women from St Hild's College and two "Home Students" (later to be organised as St Aidan's Society, now St Aidan's College). The Hild students were the first to gain degrees, graduating with BLitts in 1898. The first BA followed in 1899, being awarded to a "Miss Thomas", a member of staff at St Hild's, who also went on to become the first woman MA in 1902, although women were not admitted to Convocation until 1913. In 1899 the Women's Hostel (now St Mary's College) was founded on Claypath, moving to the Abbey House on Palace Green in 1901. Once it had the supplemental charter, Durham went further than other universities in opening up courses not only in Arts and Science but also in medicine, the College of Medicine becoming the first mixed medical school in England. In 1900 women could study medicine in England at Durham or the London School of Medicine for Women. By 1901, the London School of Medicine for Women was affiliated to Durham, enabling students there to take Durham degrees.

=== New colleges ===
Durham graduate Thomas Wilkinson became Bishop of Hexham and Newcastle in 1889 and president of the Catholic seminary, Ushaw College, near Durham, in 1890. Ushaw had been affiliated to the University of London since 1840, but in 1900 became affiliated to Durham for a decade, before reverting to London following Wilkinson's death.

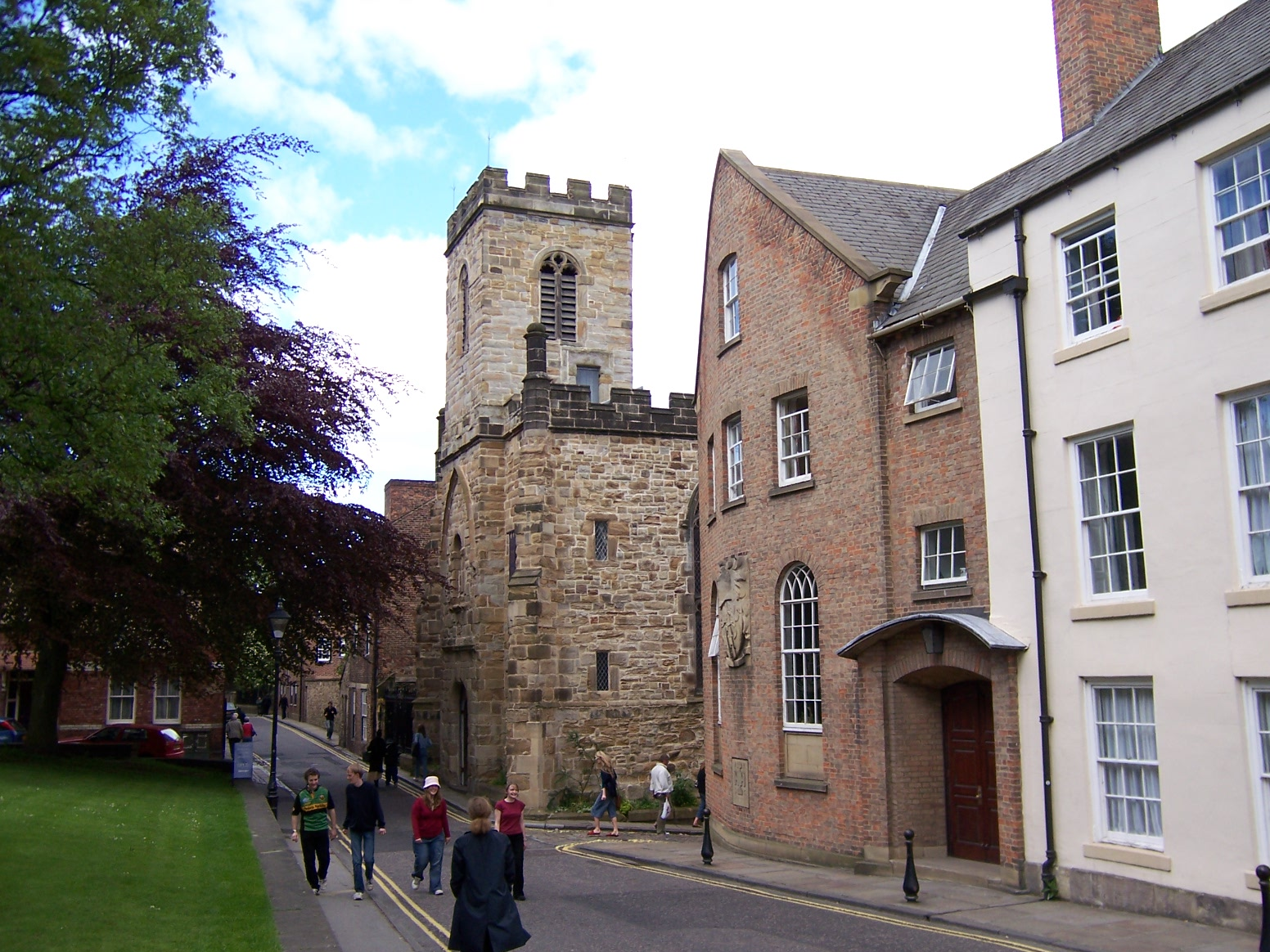
St Chad's College, one of the two independent colleges

At the start of the 20th century, the university thus consisted of a college, a hall and a women's hostel in Durham, all owned by the university, along with non-collegiate men in St Cuthbert's Society and "home" women students, all taught centrally by the university; two affiliated teacher training colleges in Durham sending students to university lectures; a medical college in Newcastle; and a government-funded university college in Newcastle.

In 1904 an independent Anglican foundation, St Chad's Hall (now St Chad's College), was established in Durham and licensed as a hall of residence. This was linked to St Chad's Hostel, established in Doncaster in 1902 in the Anglo-Catholic tradition to prepare students to enter theological colleges. In 1909 this was joined by another Anglican foundation, St John's Hall (now St John's College), established by St John's Theological College in Highbury, in the Evangelical tradition.

=== Constitutional stresses ===
The first Student Representative Council (SRC) in the university was formed in the late 19th century in the College of Medicine. The Durham Colleges SRC was formed around 1900 using the College of Medicine SRC as a model. The Durham University SRC, with equal representation for the Durham colleges, Armstrong College and the College of Medicine, was formed in 1907.

The constitutional arrangements were put under severe strain by the growth of the Newcastle colleges, which outnumbered the Durham colleges three to one, and the movement of the other provincial university colleges to independent university status from 1900. A new arrangement was proposed by Armstrong's principal, Sir Isambard Owen, in 1907. This would have made the Newcastle colleges self-governing; transferred the government from the dean and chapter to the Senate (as had been proposed in 1862), replaced the warden by a chancellor appointed by the Senate; given Durham and Newcastle equal representation in the Senate; stripped Convocation of its veto; and opened the possibility of transferring the seat of the university to Newcastle. The last two items, in particular, proved contentious, and the necessary bill was blocked in parliament until a compromise could be reached. This was that the graduates gained increased representation on the Senate, Convocation (rather than Senate) would appoint the chancellor, and the seat of the university was fixed in Durham.

The Durham University Act, enabling new statutes to be drawn up, received royal assent in April 1908, and the new statutes themselves were finally agreed and approved by the Privy Council in November 1909, transforming Durham into a federal university.

== The federal university, 1910–63 ==
=== The new constitution ===
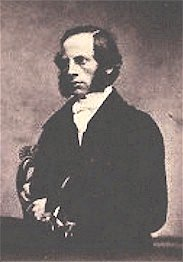
George Kitchin, dean of Durham and first chancellor of the university

After the new statues were approved, George William Kitchin, dean of Durham and formerly the warden, became the first chancellor of the university, and the sub-warden (Frank Byron Jevons, also principal of Hatfield) became the first vice-chancellor. The university property in Durham was passed to the newly formed Council of Durham Colleges – representing only University College, Hatfield Hall, and the Women's Hostel. The first president of the Council of Durham Colleges was George Nickson, then suffragan Bishop of Jarrow and later Bishop of Bristol, who served 1910–1911. He was succeeded by John Stapylton Grey Pemberton, who served until the changes of the university's constitution in 1937 and was also vice-chancellor 1918–1919.

New regulations allowed students at Armstrong College to take a "Modern B.A.", while Durham division students whose BA included Latin and Greek could add "in litteris antiquis" after their degree. Provision was also made for the affiliation of Sunderland Technical College (now Sunderland University) once it reached a sufficient standard, and any other college in the counties of Durham, Northumbria, Cumberland and Westmoreland. In 1913, women were admitted to Convocation.

The First World War saw 2,500 students and staff serve, and 325 killed. Many buildings were requisitioned in both Durham and Newcastle, and the number of students dropped so low that the university had to deny it was closing. The finances of both the Durham colleges and Armstrong College were, however, perilously low, leading to an appeal to the government for assistance.

=== Post-World War One expansion ===
In 1919, Bishop Hatfield's Hall became Hatfield College, St Bede's was licensed as a hall of residence, and St Chad's and St John's both adopted the style of independent colleges. In 1920 the Women's Hostel became St Mary's College and moved into a former prebendal house in the college (now home to the Choristers School). St John's and St Chad's were both formally made "constituent colleges" of the university in 1923, and St Hild's was licensed as a Hall of Residence. In 1921 Durham County Council established Neville's Cross College as a women's teacher training college. It became a licensed hall of the university in 1924.

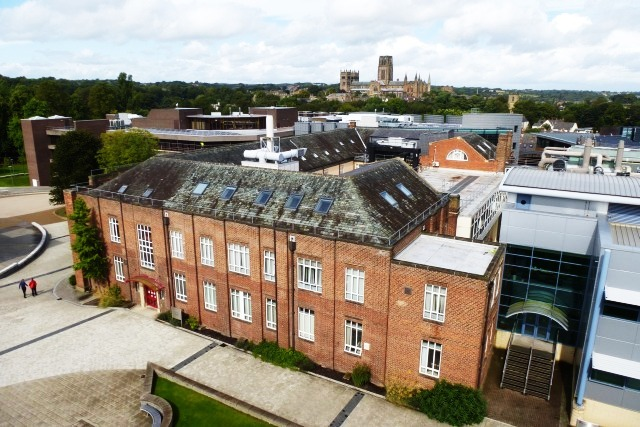
The Dawson Building (foreground), the first building on the university's science site (now lower Mountjoy) constructed in 1924

In 1920 the university had 900 students in Newcastle but only 200 in Durham. The University Grants Committee told the university in 1921 that it must produce ambitious expansion plans if it was to receive funding. This led to the establishment of a school of education and, in 1924, a faculty of pure science on what became known as the Science Site (now the Mountjoy site) on Elvet Hill. The Botanic Gardens were established on the Science Site in 1925. Important appointments at this time included Arthur Holmes, pioneer of geochronology and plate tectonics, as professor of geology and climatologist Gordon Manley, who established the Durham temperature series (based on meteorological observations at Durham Observatory and other sources) back to 1801 and the Central England temperature series dating back to 1659, as head of Geography. By 1935 numbers in Durham had more than doubled in 15 years to 475 (including 103 women), while Newcastle had grown to 1155 students.

During the 1920s and 30s, Durham Castle, home to University College, was found to be in danger of collapsing into the Wear. The issue was discussed in the House of Lords, with the government sympathising but saying there was nothing they could do to help – only ancient monuments were eligible for financial assistance, and these could not be occupied buildings. It was pointed out by Lord Gainford that this meant the government could help with the ruin once the castle fell into the river, but could not act to prevent the castle being ruined. By 1927 the Great Hall was too dangerous to use, with degree convocations being moved to the cathedral's Chapter House. The Durham Castle Preservation Fund raised around £100,000 in a nationwide campaign, with the government providing £10,000 in 1937. By 1934 underpinning had ensured the castle wouldn't collapse and convocations for degrees returned in December 1936, but it wasn't until early 1939 that the castle was completely stabilised and could be fully returned to use.

The university's centenary should have been celebrated in 1932, but with the northeast still in the grip of the Great Depression the celebrations were postponed until the centenary of the Royal Charter in 1937. 1932 did see the publication of a centenary history of the university, The University of Durham 1832 – 1932 by Charles Whiting, professor of history at the university, who also edited a small volume for the 1937 celebrations

=== Constitutional crisis ===
In the 1930s, the federal university was plunged into a constitutional crisis by arguments between the two Newcastle colleges. Austerity was imposed on the College of Medicine by the registrar and the treasurer in 1931, who also demanded the resignation of the principal without going through the Senate. This was compounded by their termination of an agreement with Armstrong College for medical students to receive teaching in physics, chemistry and biology there. The head of the UGC demanded action, and a royal commission was established by Act of Parliament in 1935 to look into the matter.

The commission recommended changes to the university's constitution, of which the most visible was the merger of the two Newcastle colleges to form King's College (originally to be called University College, Newcastle until the Durham colleges objected). The two divisions also gained permanent heads: the rector of King's College and the warden of the Durham colleges, with the vice-chancellorship alternated between them (the legacy of this lives on, in that the executive head of the university is still called "the vice-chancellor and warden"). Convocation's veto was abolished and a University Court established, and academic appointments were made the responsibility of the central University. The Senate was made responsible for granting degrees, which had previously been a function of Convocation. As a result, the ceremony at which degrees are conferred at Durham was separated from the meeting of Convocation and become known as Congregation.

The new University Court set about fundraising for an expansion of the Durham division, with plans for new buildings for St Mary's College, the student union and the science laboratories. The importance of this expansion was emphasised by a fall in the number of students to the low 400s in 1939 due to cutbacks in teacher training, although Newcastle grew to 1,500. In early 1939, permission was given to start work on the science site and the union, but this was cut short by the outbreak of the Second World War.

By the end of 1940, the number of students in Durham had fallen to only 270, forcing Hatfield and University colleges to temporarily merge. But 1941 saw RAF cadets sent to Durham to study science – primarily maths, physics and mechanics – raising student numbers back to healthier levels. Newcastle, with its much larger student population, was much less affected than the Durham colleges.

=== Expansion after World War Two ===
After the war, the Durham division expanded rapidly – the Warden, Sir James Duff, believing not only that growth was essential but that more accommodation was the necessary first step to growing the division. Durham had to be a residential university – it didn't have the local population to thrive otherwise. He planned to double the number of students in Durham to over 1,000 in a decade. Under pressure from the UGC, this target was raised to 2,000 in 1946. Newcastle was also constrained – at 1,700 students it had reached what was felt to be the local capacity, and (like the other civic universities) would have to start looking further afield to attract students in order to reach its target of 3,000.

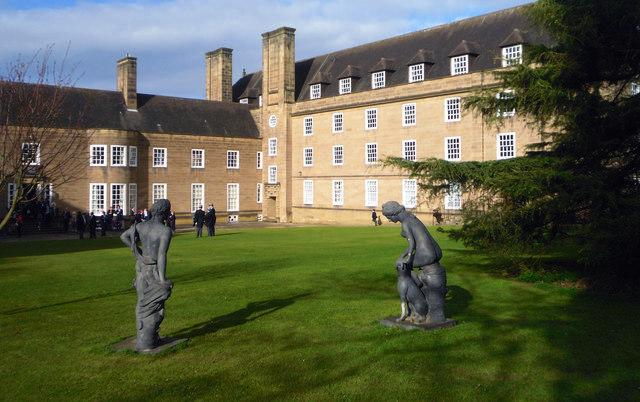
St Mary's College buildings on Elvet Hill, opened in 1952

1947 saw progress towards this goal. St Aidan's Society (St Aidan's College from 1965) was founded as the female counterpart to St Cuthbert's Society, catering for the non-resident "home student" women, and moved onto Shincliffe Hall; the foundation stone for the new St. Mary's College building on Elvet Hill was laid by Princess Elizabeth (later Queen Elizabeth II); and plans for a new men's college (to become Grey College) were approved by the Council of the Durham Colleges. In the same year, the College of the Venerable Bede (as St Bede's College had been renamed in 1935) became a constituent college of the university. Lumley Castle was also leased from 1945 to house students from University College. By 1948 the Durham division hit 1100 students – the growth in numbers outstripping the residential capacity of the university and leaving a third of students without College accommodation – while Newcastle had over 3200.

We badly underestimated the rate at which our numbers would increase after the war

— Sir James Duff, 1950, quoted in The Durham Difference

St Mary's took five years to build, the new site finally opening in 1952. In the same year, final approval was given to the establishment of a new men's college south of the river, linked with the expansion of the science site. However, although the UGC approved the plan, funds were not immediately available, however, and it was 1956 before financial approval was given and 1957 before building work began. The new college opened in 1959 as Grey College – the name being chosen over Cromwell College by a single vote – but the main block was not completed until 1961.

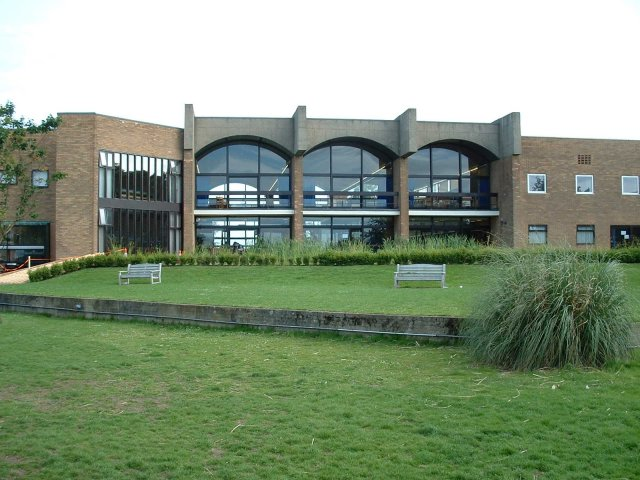
Buildings of St Aidan's College, designed by Sir Basil Spence and opened in 1964

Expansion also continued in other parts of the university. The West Building, for the departments of geography and mathematics, opened in 1952. Work on a new central admissions system, replacing the system whereby students applied to individual colleges, began in 1958. In the same year St John's College was formally divided into two closely-linked parts: St John's Hall for university students and Cranmer Hall for those preparing for ordination. 1960 saw the opening of the department of applied science. In 1961, St Aidan's Society became St Aidan's College, and in 1964 it moved into its new buildings on Elvet Hill, designed by Sir Basil Spence. Work on Dunelm House and Kingsgate Bridge started in 1962.

In 1960 the council set a target of 3,000 students by the early 1970s, and in 1962 a target of 4,500 students by the early 1980s. Two more men's colleges (to become Van Mildert College and Collingwood College) and a third women's college (to become Trevelyan College) were planned.

In 1946 the University College of the West Indies was established, affiliated to the University of London. In 1955 this became the University of the West Indies (UWI) and Codrington College stopped offering degrees except in theology. In 1965, Codrington became affiliated to the UWI and no longer offered undergraduate Durham degrees. Codrington's affiliation to Durham was finally removed from the University Statutes on 13 July 2011.

=== Tensions between the Newcastle and Durham divisions ===
In 1947, tensions had surfaced again over the Durham-Newcastle divide, with the growth in numbers meaning "the two divisions were acting as de facto universities". Lord Percy, rector of King's College, proposed that the university change its name to the 'University of Durham and Newcastle', with the divisions becoming 'Durham University' and 'Newcastle University'. This idea was defeated in Convocation (the assembly of members of the university) by 135 votes to 129.

By the late 1950s, Durham had over 1,500 students and Newcastle 3,500. The academic board of the Newcastle division passed a resolution on 29 January 1960 calling for Newcastle to become an independent university:

the healthy development of the university now makes desirable the establishment of a University of Newcastle in place of King's College

— Academic Board of the Newcastle Division of Durham University, quoted in The Durham Difference

On 23 February 1960 the academic board of the Durham division gave their agreement and by June the Council of King's College and the Council of the Durham Colleges had both approved. The government and the UGC approved the plan on 21 July, and by May 1961 statutes had been drafted. The Universities of Durham and Newcastle upon Tyne Act received royal assent on 10 July 1963, and on 1 August 1963 King's College became the University of Newcastle upon Tyne, leaving Durham University once more based solely in its home city.

== Modern university, 1963–99 ==
The university's new statutes abolished the court but maintained the title of Warden of the Durham Colleges, with the executive head of the university being the vice-chancellor and warden. In 1963, the university consisted of five council colleges (now styled maintained colleges), with a further three planned, St Cuthbert's Society, the three independent constituent colleges (now styled recognised colleges), and the two licensed halls (the women's teacher training colleges: St Hild's and Neville's Cross).

Expansion continued, with Grey College's third building opening in 1963. In 1964 the centralised admissions system went into operation. Van Mildert College, the School of Engineering, the Durham Business School, the Graduate Society (now Ustinov College), the Maiden Castle sports ground and a number of other academic departments all opened in 1965; and in the same year the BEd degree was introduced for students at the teacher training colleges. Trevelyan College and the new buildings for St Aidan's College opened in 1966. The botanic garden moved to its current site in 1970. Construction of new residences for University College in Durham also meant Lumley Castle could finally be given up in 1970.

Sierra Leone had gained its independence in 1961, and in 1967 the government established the University of Sierra Leone. Fourah Bay College joined Njala University College to form the new university and ended its affiliation with Durham.

In 1963, Neville's Cross College became mixed, and in 1966 Cranmer Hall in St John's College became the first Anglican theological college in the world to train women for ordination. The Roman Catholic seminary of Ushaw College, which had been located in Ushaw Moor near Durham since 1808, was licensed as a hall of residence in 1968. St Chad's Hall stopped training for the Anglican priesthood in 1972, and in 1976 changed its name to St Chad's College.

In 1965 the sports hall at Maiden Castle opened and in 1966 Dunelm House was finally completed, providing centralised student facilities and a home for the Student Representative Council and the Athletics Union moved in. In 1969 the Statutes were amended to give the president of the Student Representative Council a seat on the University Council. In 1970 the Student Representative Council became Durham Student Union.

In 1967, the Durham coach on the Comex II expedition of the Commonwealth Expedition, was hit by the jib of a mobile crane travelling in the opposite direction near Popovača, thirty seven miles south-east of Zagreb in Croatia. Fourteen students from Durham, Newcastle and Sunderland universities were killed, with two others seriously injured.

In the 1970s the reorganisation of teacher training by the government threatened the existence of the three teacher training colleges. In 1975 St Hild's College and the College of the Venerable Bede merged to form the College of St Hild and St Bede, remaining a Recognised College and teaching a university-validated BEd. This lasted until 1979 when it surrendered its autonomy to become a Maintained College of the university, with all teacher training being transferred to the university's School of Education. Neville's Cross College merged with Durham Technical College in 1977, leaving the university and forming New College Durham.

Following the lowering of the age of majority from 21 to 18 in 1970, meaning universities were no longer in loco parentis, Van Mildert became the first maintained college to go mixed in 1971, with some students transferring in from other colleges that year followed by a full intake in 1972. This was followed in 1972 by the opening of Collingwood College as the first purpose-built mixed college, and the first university residence in the UK to have men's and women's rooms in the same blocks. In 1973 St John's College went fully mixed, admitting women to St John's Hall.

St Aidan's decided to become mixed in 1978, with the first men entering in 1981 – the first of the Women's colleges to do so. This was followed by Grey JCR voting to go mixed in 1983, and the college governing board ratifying the decision. Some women students who had not won places at other colleges were admitted in 1984 and the first full intake was in 1985. Decisions by college governing boards and the University Council in 1986 led to the final three men's colleges going mixed, in some cases against the wishes of the students: University College in 1987, and Hatfield and St Chad's in 1988. In October 1987, Trevelyan's governing body voted to go mixed despite the JCR voting to remain women-only. The first men were admitted in 1990.

In 1986 Durham Castle and Cathedral were made a UNESCO World Heritage Site in the first group of sites recognised in the UK. This was extended in 2008 to cover Palace Green and the surrounding buildings.

In 1987 the perception still existed that the university was too small. The student population was limited to 5000 (4936 in 1987), and had only grown by 200 over the previous 5 years. The Senate noted in May 1988 that expansion was desirable, but that it would be more cost effective, and less risky to do this by making "more intensive use … of the present facilities" rather than establishing a new college. By 1990 numbers had reached 5,908 and by 1995, 9,717 in Durham City or 10,436 including Stockton (see below) – doubling the population in under ten years.

In 1988 the Wesley Study Centre opened within St John's College as a training centre for Methodist ministers, forming a unique ecumenical partnership with Cranmer Hall to train Anglican and Methodist ministers alongside each other.

In 1989 the university started its fund-raising and alumni office, with a virtual community for alumni and several large gifts made to the university, including for the Centre for Middle Eastern Studies, the Department of Physics and the Wolfson Research Institute.

1990 saw the opening of the Teikyo University of Japan in Durham, an overseas campus of Teikyo University in Japan, by Katharine, Duchess of Kent.

From 1993 to 1997 the university attempted unsuccessfully to raise funds for a new college at Howlands Farm. In 1997 the decision was made to instead build postgraduate accommodation on the site under the management of the existing Graduate Society.

In 1994, Durham was one of the founder members of the 1994 Group of smaller research-intensive universities, set up in response to the establishment of the Russell Group.

=== Development in Stockton ===
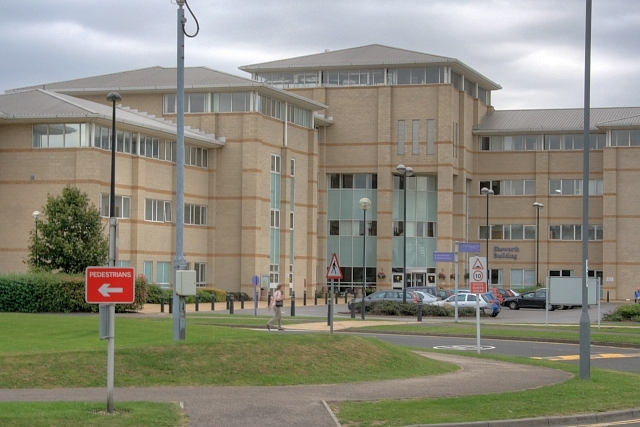
Ebsworth Building, Queen's Campus

The idea of Durham University establishing a presence on Teesside was first floated in 1987 and planning began in earnest in 1988 for a "Birkbeck of the North" with around 1,000 students. Teesside was, at that time, the largest conurbation in Europe without a university, and the Teesside Development Corporation had recently been established to try to regenerate the area. In April 1989 a formal announcement was made that Teesside Polytechnic and Durham University were working together "in planning a major development in Higher Education in Cleveland and its adjacent areas".

Stresses in the partnership arise in December 1989, when Durham approved plans for a new Institute of Health Studies without discussions with the Polytechnic. This led in January 1990 to a formula establishing the development as a Joint University College between Durham and Teesside rather than (as originally conceived) a Durham college with backing from Teesside. This was approved by Senate in mid February and the initiative was launched publicly three days later.

The initial bid to the funding councils (the Universities Funding Council – UFC; and the Polytechnics and Colleges Funding Council – PCFC) was for 280 students initially, rising to 840 after three years. In 1991 the UFC and PCFC agreed to fund 100 places each initially, rising to 225 each – only half of what had been hoped for. Nevertheless, plans went ahead and a site opposite Stockton-on-Tees on the south bank of the river was chosen. The Joint University College on Teesside (JUCOT) was formally launched on 3 September 1991 by Michael Fallon, Schools Minister and MP for Darlington.

On 1 January 1992, Robert Parfitt was appointed as the first principal of the college. Later that year Durham's statutes were modified to allow it grant joint degrees, regulations for the degrees to be awarded by JUCOT were established, and JUCOT was formally incorporated as a Limited Company established under a joint venture agreement between Durham and Teesside. The name did not, however, prove acceptable to the various government departments, nor was the alternative of Queen's College (there were too many already), but the name of University College, Stockton was approved just before opening on 12 October 1992 with an initial enrolment of 190 students.

Near the end of is first year of operation, the college was formally opened by Queen Elizabeth II on 18 May 1993. The 1993 academic year saw student numbers grow to 430 with the addition of teacher training. In 1994, at the suggestion of the UCS board, Durham assumed administrative and financial responsibility for the college. At the same time, approval was given to build student residences at Stockton, and the Privy Council approved changes to Durham's statutes making UCS a residential and teaching college of the university.

Parfitt retired in April 1994 and was replaced as principal by John Hayward. Integration with Durham began, with the departments being established as Boards of Studies, and the company being wound up – its board of directors becoming (like Durham colleges) a board of governors, still including Teesside but with increased representation from Durham.

In 1996 it was agreed that students at Stockton would take degrees of Durham from 1998, rather than the joint degrees that had been awarded previously. With Durham taking on sole responsibility in 1998, the campus was renamed the University of Durham, Stockton Campus (UDSC), separating teaching responsibilities from UCS.

== 21st century ==
In 2000 the new Graduate Society accommodation and offices at the Howlands Farm site were opened. The Graduate Society became Ustinov College in 2003.

By 2000 student numbers at University College, Stockton had reached 1,350, with plans to grow to 2,000 by 2003. It was bigger than any other Durham college, and set to keep growing. It was therefore decided to split UCS into two colleges that would be similar to the colleges in Durham City. The colleges were established as "shadow colleges" in October 2000. The two new colleges, named John Snow and Stephenson (originally George Stephenson) after the physician and the engineer, were formally established in September 2001, replacing UCS.

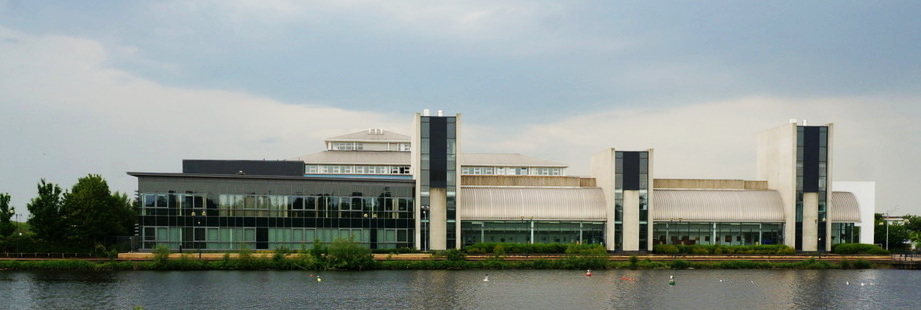
Wolfson Research Institute

Also in 2001 the new medical school at UDSC (operating in association with the University of Newcastle upon Tyne) took in its first students – the first medics to join Durham since 1963 – and the Wolfson Research Institute opened. In 2002, her golden jubilee year, the Queen granted UDSC the title of "Queen's Campus".

2002 saw the location for degree congregations moved from Durham Castle and Stockton Parish Church to Durham Cathedral, reducing the number of ceremonies from 24 (3 in Stockton) to a more manageable 12. By 2003, 10 years after Stockton's opening, the university had 11,021 undergraduates, 17% of them on the Queen's Campus, and 2843 postgraduates. By 2013 this had increased to 12550 undergraduates, still with 17% in Stockton, and 4538 postgraduates.

In 2003 the last single-sex college, St. Mary's, which was receiving fewer than 200 direct applications each year, voted to go mixed. The first undergraduate men entered in 2005. In 2004 the university started the building of a new college next to Ustinov on the Howlands Farm site, as well as the construction of more accommodation for Ustinov. This opened in 2006 as Josephine Butler College, the first completely new college to open in Durham itself since the 1970s, and the only purpose-built self-catering college within Durham.

2003 also saw the announcement of a controversial Strategic Improvement Plan. This included the closure of the departments of East Asian Studies and European Studies, the transfer of Linguistics to Newcastle (receiving their department of Religious Studies in return) and the movement of Middle East and Islamic Studies to become postgraduate-only, losing is undergraduate intake. The closures were expected to free up £8.7M for re-investment in more popular courses. The closure, particularly of East Asian Studies, meet with opposition from the Foreign Office, Durham City Council and the Japan Foundation. The cuts formed part of a tend in UK higher education at the time for small departments to be closed or merged, linked by The Guardian to "a combination of market forces and a strict funding regime". A 2003 article by John Crace, also written for The Guardian, suggested the reforms were driven by Durham not having 'high numbers of overseas or postgraduate students to augment the balance sheet', which influenced the selection of departments to be shut down – East Asian Studies students being comparatively more expensive to teach and limited in number, while the business school was apparently saved (despite then having one of the worst research ratings in the university) because it was one of the few parts of the university to attract any great number of overseas students.

In 2004 Durham was shortlisted for the Sunday Times University of the Year. In 2005 it was shortlisted again and won the award.

In 2005, the university unveiled a new logo (consisting of a stylised monochrome version of the coat of arms in palatinate purple) and logotype, and adopted the trading name of "Durham University". The new branding caused much discussion, and Van Mildert JCR voted not to use the new name and logo. The official name of the institution remains the University of Durham and no change was made to the actual coat of arms.

The Charities Act 2006 necessitated a number of changes to the structure of the university's student bodies that went into effect in 2011. Previously exempt charities, Student Unions were now to be regulated by the Charity Commission for England and Wales. The College JCRs were forced to decide whether to remain independent and become registered charities or to become part of the university. The university set up the "Durham Student Organisations Framework" for those JCRs (from the Maintained Colleges) becoming part of the university. Most eligible JCRs, along with Team Durham (previously the Durham University Athletics Union) and some other University-wide student bodies, chose to join this framework. Durham Students Union, the JCRs of Grey, St Cuthbert's and Trevelyan, and the Ustinov GCR, became independent charities on 1 August 2011. Trevelyan JCR has since joined the framework (on 1 January 2014) and ceased to be an independent charity. St John's JCR also chose to become an independent charity rather than be merged with the college. The Act also removed exempt charity status from the colleges and halls in the universities of Cambridge and Durham and the colleges in the University of Oxford. This forced the St John's College, St Chad's College, and Ushaw College to become registered charities (the Maintained Colleges, being legally incorporated into the university and thus not having separate charitable status, were not affected).

In 2007 the campus cafeteria, "The Waterside Room", was renovated and now serves as the campus student bar. In addition to this facility both colleges at the campus benefit from their own college bars, managed centrally, however, and not by their JCRs. In 2007 the university announced that it had acquired an option on 4-acre (16,000 m^{2}) of land in the 56-acre Northshore development on the north bank of the Tees, opposite the existing Queen's Campus site, along with plans to develop the academic structure at Queen's and the possibility of a new college. In 2012 it was announced that after a four-year delay due to the state of the economy, the Northshore development was proceeding, including plans from the university for academic facilities and a 500-bed residential development. The Queen's Campus cafeteria, was reopened after renovation in February 2008 to serve as a dining room, the Waterside Restaurant, used two days a week by each of the two Queen's Campus colleges, and their joint college bar, the Waterside Bar. On 14 May 2009 the Infinity Bridge was opened, linking the Queen's Campus and the Teasdale business park to the Northshore development. In November 2015 it was announced that the university would not be renewing its option on development of the Northshore site and would be holding a "wide and robust consultation process" on the future of the Queen's Campus.

In Durham City, development was concentrated in the Elvet Hill area, leading to fears that Durham was moving away from the city centre and becoming a "campus university". The Calman Learning Centre on the Mountjoy Site opened in 2007. This was followed by Anthropology moving to Mountjoy and Economics moving to the Business School. In 2012 the new Palatine Centre was opened on the Mountjoy Site, housing the Law school and the university administration and an extension to the Bill Bryson library on the Mountjoy Site was opened. However, the university also spent £10 million on the refurbishment of the Palace Green Library between 2009 and 2014, creating new galleries and a special exhibitions space.

In 2006 the university partnered with Manchester and Edinburgh to create the Centre for Advanced Study of the Arab World with funding from the UK government. In 2008 the university created the Sharjah Chair in Islamic Law and Finance with an endowment from Sheikh Sultan bin Muhammad Al-Qasimi, Emir of Sharjah. This followed an earlier donation in 1999 by the Emir, which funded the construction of the Al Qasimi building (opened in 2003). The decision to accept funding from Al-Qasimi was criticised as spreading "extremist ideas" by Anthony Glees, director of Brunel University's Centre for Intelligence and Security Studies, who had previously claimed a number of British universities had been infiltrated by Islamic extremists.

In 2008 Durham launched the Centre for Catholic Studies in collaboration with the Diocese of Hexham and Newcastle, including the Bede Professor of Catholic Theology, the first chair in Catholic theology at a secular University in the UK. As the Bede Professor serves as theological advisor to the Bishop of Hexham and Newcastle, the post is (following legal advice) restricted to practising Catholics, but the holder is not required to obtain the mandatum. However, in 2011 Ushaw College closed as a Catholic seminary. It remains (as of 2015) a Licensed Hall of Residence in the university's statutes. Parts of Ushaw are currently used by Durham University Business School and Josephine Butler College, as well as the Centre for Catholic Studies. The Ushaw library has been integrated with the Durham University library, and the university is investigating the possibility of Ushaw becoming home to a new university college. In 2014 a £2M endowment was secured to establish the St Hilda Chair in Catholic Social Thought and Practice. In October 2015 the Catholic National Library moved to Durham University.

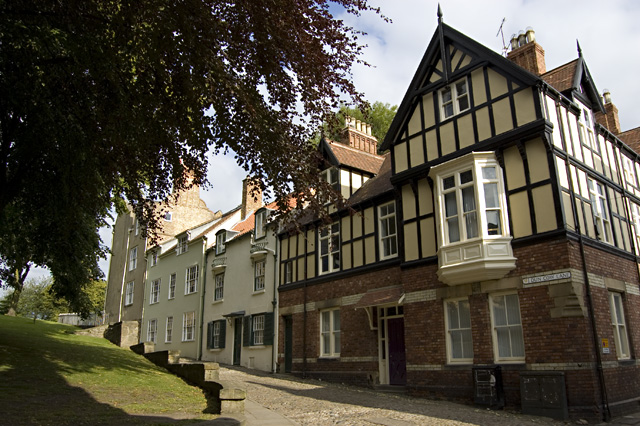
The university's Department of Theology is partly housed in buildings on Dun Cow Lane

In July 2009, Tony Blair, the former British Prime Minister, announced a strategic partnership with Durham University, following Yale University and the National University of Singapore, to create a global network of twelve leading research universities for delivering his Faith and Globalization Initiative in association with Tony Blair Faith Foundation.

Between 2010 and 2012, Durham was criticised for accepting a number of donations from controversial sources. On 28 January 2010, Durham hosted a seminar sponsored by the government of Iran, which attracted protests and coverage in the national press. In February 2011, the Durham Student newspaper Palatinate broke the story that a leaked diplomatic cable revealed that a series of Iranian seminars at Durham had been funded by the US State Department as "political cover" for contacts with Iran. Vice-Chancellor Chris Higgins claimed in an interview with Palatinate that the funding had not been deliberately hidden and would have been revealed if anyone had asked, but accepted that more should have been done to let participants know the source of the funding. In March 2011, Conservative MP Robert Halfon accused Durham of accepting "blood money" from the Iranian government and launched an Early Day Motion (which attracted no other signatories) calling for a Government enquiry. Later that month it was revealed that the university had accepted a £2.5M donation from the prime minister of Kuwait, Sheikh Nasser Al-Sabah, to endow the Sheikh Nasser al-Mohammad Al-Sabah Chair and a related research programme in global security, leading to further criticism.

This was overshadowed a few weeks later by the news that Durham had accepted £125,000 from British American Tobacco towards an appeal for scholarships for Afghan women from Kabul University. The university claimed that "The BAT donation was accepted following careful consideration by the University Executive Committee (UEC) in line with its Gift Acceptance Policy". However, Cancer Research UK claimed that "The death and disease caused by BAT's products dwarf this small award" and accused Durham of breaching the World Health Organization's Framework Convention on Tobacco Control.

In July 2012, it was reported in the Syria Files that an aide to Syrian President Bashar al-Assad was to receive a PhD from Durham. Halfon again attacked the university, which responded with a statement saying that students were admitted and awarded degrees solely on merit and denying "any formal or active links with the Syrian government". In September the al-Sabah programme was officially launched in the presence of Sheikh Nasser al-Sabah. However, since pledging his donation the Sheikh had been forced to resign as prime minister of Kuwait in late 2011 over allegations his government had misappropriated state funds. Despite his being cleared of the allegations by a judicial tribunal in May 2012, this drew further protests from Halfon and links were drawn by the Daily Telegraph between this and the acceptance by the London School of Economics of donations from Saif al-Islam, son of Libyan leader Colonel Ghadaffi.

In November 2012 it was revealed by the Times Higher Education that the university's senior management had overruled the Ethics Committee to accept the donation from British American Tobacco. It was also revealed that the university and British American Tobacco had agreed not to publicise the donation for fear of attracting criticism and that the executive committee had been split over accepting the money. The Times Higher Education revealed there had been resignations from the university's council over the issue and asked if the resignation of the university's registrar in June 2012 was also linked.

In 2012 Durham, along with three other universities, accepted an invitation to join the Russell Group and left the 1994 Group.

In July 2012, Council endorsed a "residential accommodation strategy" for 2012–2020. This sets a target of 50–70% of students housed in University accommodation and predicted growth in student numbers to 14,000 in Durham City and 2,500 at the Queen's Campus by 2015/16 and to 15,300 in Durham City and 3,400 at the Queen's Campus by 2019/20. With 5,700 beds in Durham and 900 in Stockton for 2012/13, meeting the accommodation targets would require (in Durham) 1,250 new beds by 2015 and 1,950 by 2019 and (in Stockton) 730 new beds by 2015 and 1,150 by 2019.

In the same year Council approved plans for a new 500 room college, with the preferred site being the former golf course at Mount Oswald. In 2014 the university acquired the land on Mount Oswald and entered into a contract with the developers to build accommodation for 1000 students.

Also in 2012, the Church of England announced that Durham had been chosen as the partner university for the Common Award for ministerial training. This scheme provides for a common suite of awards, validated by Durham, for all ordinands in the Church of England and its partner churches from September 2014.

The Methodist Connexion decided in 2012 that they would centralise ministerial training in two centres, meaning the withdrawal of ministerial trainees from the Wesley Study Centre, with the last ministerial candidates graduating in 2014. It was announced in 2014 that the centre would be remaining open as a research and postgraduate education centre.

In 2013, the Michael Ramsey Chair in Anglican Studies (not to be confused with Kent's Michael Ramsey Chair in Modern Theology) was established in partnership with Durham Cathedral. This, like the Van Mildert Professor of Divinity is a canon professorship, with the holder being a non-residentiary canon of the cathedral. The holder is not (unlike the Van Mildert Professor, who is a residentiary canon) required to be ordained but is required, as a member of the college of canons, to be "a communicant member of the Church of England or the Anglican Communion, or of any other member church of Churches Together in Britain and Ireland (which includes most Christian denominations), or of a church in communion with such a church". The first Ramsey Professor, Michael Snape, was appointed in 2015.

In 2014, Durham established the UNESCO Chair in Archaeological Ethics and Practice in Cultural Heritage, the first UNESCO chair in Durham and the thirteenth in the UK.

In 2014, Durham won the Times and Sunday Times Sports University of the Year 2015, and in 2015 it was shortlisted for the third time for the Times and Sunday Times University of the Year 2016.

In November 2015, it was announced that the university would not be renewing its option on development of the site on the north bank of the Tees and would be holding a consultation on the future of the Queen's Campus. In February 2016 it was announced that the university's working group had recommended moving the colleges and academic activities currently at the Queen's Campus to Durham City from September 2017. This decision was confirmed in May 2016, with the School of Medicine, Pharmacy and Health being transferred to Newcastle University on 1 August 2017. The Queen's Campus is to remain part of the university and will be repurposed as an International Study Centre, to be run by Study Group.

In 2020, the university opened its 17th college, South College, which is set among the 'hill' colleges, next door to Van Mildert College. The Palatinate student newspaper had reported that the college would be renamed 'Vine College' after Jeremy Vine, although this turned out to be an April-fools joke.

In 2023, the university announced that the old county hospital, at the time home to Unite Student's Rushford Court, would, in the long term become Durham's 18th college.

== See also ==
- List of vice-chancellors and wardens of the Durham University
- List of chancellors of Durham University
