= Geneviève Baqtar Sydarous =

Egyptian writer and activist

Geneviève Baqtar Sydarous (Arabic: جنفياف بقطر سيداروس, romanized: Janfyāf Baqṭar Sīdārūs; 1925 - 2016), also known as "Faiza," was a journalist, translator, tour guide, writer, and documentary filmmaker.

== Early life and education ==
Sydarous was born in the Faggala district of Cairo on August 16, 1925.

She earned her bachelor's degree in English from Cairo University. In 1953, she earned a Master's degree in journalism, also from Cairo University. Her articles were published in several Egyptian periodicals, including Al-Siyasa, Al-Balagh, Al-Jamahir, and Al-Musawar. During her college years, she was active in student life and joined the "Shakespeare Group," where she met leftist activists and began her involvement in communist organizing. She developed a friendship with Egyptian painter Inji Aflatoun through their shared activities with the University Girls League.

== Career ==
Sydarous' involvement in mass demonstrations and communist organizing led to multiple arrests and a temporary suspension from the university. After being arrested and tried in military court in 1949, she was sentenced to two years in prison, though this was later reduced to one year. After release, she continued organizing student protests, including during the Tripartite Aggression of 1956. In March 1959, she was again arrested from her home in Maadi, Cairo, and detained without charge at Qanater Prison until her release in July 1963.

After release from prison, she ceased writing and suspended her involvement in political activities for several years at her husband's request. Later in life, however, she resumed writing. In 2003, Sydarous joined a group of Arab intellectuals as a co-signer on a public condemnation of the Geneva Accord.

At age 74, she studied screenwriting and directing at Qasr al-Sīnimā in Cairo. Her first feature film, "al-Ḥaḍāra al-Miṣriyya: Nubl wa-Sumūw wa-Khulūd" (“Egyptian Civilization: Noble, Sublime, and Eternal”) was awarded Best Documentary Film at the Egyptian Catholic Center for Cinema Festival. At age 85, she produced her second film, "al-Lugha al-Sīnimāʾiyya ʿind al-Miṣriyyīn al-Qudamāʾ" ("The Cinematic Language of the Ancient Egyptians"). Her films were screened in Cairo and at international film festivals in Switzerland and Italy.

== Awards and honours ==
In August 2015, Sydarous was honored with a celebration of her ninetieth birthday at the "Dal" center in Cairo. The event, attended by several Egyptian intellectuals and artists, included a screening of "The Cinematic Language of the Ancient Egyptians," and a book signing for her semi-autobiographical novel Fī Sijn al-Nisāʾ: Wajh al-Ḥayāt al-Ākhar (In the Women's Prison:The Other Side of Life).

In October 2025, Sydarous was honored in the Cairo-based Women and Memory Forum's public exhibition Her Mark in History, which curated oral histories of several twentieth-century women pioneers, including Nadia Lutfi, Awatef Abdel Karim, Hikmat Abu Zayd, and Widād Mitrī.

== Selected works ==
- Thurayya, Shākir, Jinīfīf Sīdārūs, Suʿād Zuhair, Fāṭima Zakī, and Widād Mitrī. al-Marʾah fī al-ḥarakah al-shiyūʿīyah al-Miṣrīyah ḥattā ʿām 1965 (Women in the Egyptian Communist Movement through 1965) (2002)
- al-Lugha al-Sīnimāʾiyya ʿind al-Miṣriyyīn al-Qudamāʾ (The Cinematic Language of the Ancient Egyptians) (2010)
- al-Ḥaḍāra al-Miṣriyya: Nubl wa-Sumūw wa-Khulūd (Egyptian Civilization: Noble, Sublime, and Eternal) (2015)
- Fī Sijn al-Nisāʾ: Wajh al-Ḥayāt al-Ākhar (In the Women's Prison: The Other Side of Life) (2015): This novel, which she was encouraged to write by Naguib Mahfouz, is based on Sydarous' experiences at the Qanater women's prison from 1959 to 1963. The text cycles between depictions of everyday life inside the prison and memories of political activities from before her incarceration. It also depicts Sydarous' relationships with political and non-political prisoners, their incarcerated husbands, and their wider network of associated activists, intellectuals, and writers, including Inji Aflatoun, Thurayya Shākir, Fawzī Ḥabashī, Fāṭima Zakī, Saʿadia ʿUthmān, Thurayya Ibrahīm, Asma Halim, Marcelle Ninio, Thurayya Adham, Suʿād al-Ṭawīl, and Salah Jahin.
