= Hoda Elsadda =

Hoda Elsadda is Professor of English and Comparative Literature at the Faculty of Arts, Cairo University, a position she has held since 2011. She is a founding member and Chair of the Board of the Women and Memory Forum (WMF), a feminist research and advocacy organisation she co-founded in 1995. She previously served as Chair in the Study of the Contemporary Arab World at the University of Manchester (2005–2011) and Co-Director of the Centre for the Advanced Study of the Arab World (CASAW) in the UK (2006–2011).

In 2013, Elsadda was appointed as a member of the Committee of Fifty (50-Committee) that drafted the Egyptian Constitution of 2014, where she coordinated the Freedoms and Rights Committee. She was a Carnegie Visiting Scholar at Georgetown University (2014–2015), a Leverhulme Fellow (2009–2010), and a Yale World Fellow at Yale University (2003).

She is a member of the editorial boards of several peer-reviewed journals, including Hawwa: Journal of Women of the Middle East and the Islamic World (2017–present), the Journal of Middle East Women's Studies (2015–present), and Critical Times: Interventions in Global Critical Theory (2019–present). She serves on the Board of Governance of the Arab Reform Initiative (2015–present) and the Board of Trustees of the Sawiris Cultural Award (2005–present).

She is a former member of the editorial board of the International Journal of Middle East Studies (IJMES), the Advisory Committee for the Anna Lindh Euro-Mediterranean Foundation for the Dialogue Between Cultures, a former member of the National Council for Human Rights in Egypt, a former board member of the Egyptian Organization for Human Rights and a former member of the Core Team of the Arab Human Development Report. In 1992, she co-founded and co-edited Hagar, an interdisciplinary journal in women's studies published in Arabic. She has written articles and edited books dealing with discourses on gender in modern Arab history, particularly in the late nineteenth and early twentieth century. Her research focuses on gender and culture in the Middle East, Arab women's writing, oral histories, women's creative writing, comparative literature, and Arabic literature and popular culture.

== Education ==
- B.A. in English Literature, Cairo University, 1978
- M.A. in English and Comparative Literature, American University in Cairo, 1982
- Ph.D. in English Literature, Cairo University, 1988

== Academic positions ==
- 2011–present: Professor of English and Comparative Literature, Faculty of Arts, Cairo University
- 2017–2018: Visiting Scholar, Asfari Institute, American University in Beirut
- 2014–2015: Carnegie Visiting Scholar, Georgetown University
- 2005–2011: Chair in the Study of the Contemporary Arab World, University of Manchester
- 2006–2011: Co-Director, Centre for the Advanced Study of the Arab World (CASAW), UK
- 2000–2005: Professor of English and Comparative Literature, Cairo University
- 1994–1999: Assistant Professor, Department of English, Faculty of Arts, Cairo University
- 1988–1994: Lecturer, Department of English, Faculty of Arts, Cairo University

== Fellowships and awards ==
- 2014–2015: Carnegie Visiting Scholar, Georgetown University
- 2009–2010: Leverhulme Fellowship, United Kingdom
- 2003: Yale World Fellow, Yale University
- 1997: Fellow, International Centre for Research on Women, Washington D.C.

== Women and Memory Forum ==
Elsadda co-founded the Women and Memory Forum (WMF) in 1995. WMF consists of a group of women scholars, researchers, and activists who strive to produce and disseminate alternative cultural knowledge of women in Arab cultures throughout history and in contemporary society. The group advocates for the promotion of gender as an analytical framework to help combat negative stereotypes of Arab women in the cultural sphere. According to their website, "The long-term objective of WMF's specialized research is to produce and make available alternative cultural information about Arab women that can be used for raising awareness and empowering women."

== Egyptian Constitution of 2014 ==
In 2013, Elsadda was appointed as a member of the Committee of Fifty (50-Committee), the body tasked with drafting the Egyptian Constitution of 2014. Within the committee, she served as coordinator of the Freedoms and Rights Committee. The constitution was approved by national referendum in January 2014.

== Selected publications ==
=== Books ===
- Elsadda, Hoda; Shami, Seteney (2026). Handbook to Gendering the Cultural Histories of the Modern Arab World. London: I.B. Tauris.
- Elsadda, Hoda (2025). jandarit al-arshif al-arabi [Gendering the Arab Archive] (in Arabic). Beirut: The Arab Council for Social Sciences.
- Elsadda, Hoda (2024). Humanities in the Arab World in Times of Conflict and Change. Beirut: The Arab Council for Social Sciences.
- Elsadda, Hoda; Sabea, Hanan (2018). Oral History in Times of Change: Gender, Documentation and the Making of Archives. Cairo Papers in Social Science. Vol. 35. Cairo: American University in Cairo Press.
- Elsadda, Hoda; Hassan, Maissan (2018). Bina' wa nidal: min arshif al-haraka al-niswiyya al-masriyya [A Legacy of Struggle and Institution Building: From the Archive of the Egyptian Feminist Movement] (in Arabic). Cairo: The Women and Memory Forum.
- Elsadda, Hoda (2015). al-Niswiyya wa al-Tarikh [Feminism and History] (in Arabic). Cairo: The Women and Memory Forum.
- Sadda, Hoda (2012). Gender, nation, and the Arabic novel: Egypt, 1892-2008. Syracuse, New York: Syracuse University Press. ISBN 9780815632962.
- Sadda, Hoda; et al. (2002). Madkhal ila qadaya al-mar'a fi sutur wa suwar [A beginner's guide to women's issues] (in Arabic). Cairo: The Women and Memory Forum.

=== Edited books ===
- Sadda, Hoda; et al. (1998). Zaman al-Nisa' wa al-Dhakira al-Badila [Women's Time and Alternate Memory] (in Arabic). Cairo: The Women and Memory Forum.
- Sadda, Hoda (2001). Min Ra'idat al-Qarn al-'Ishriyn: Shakhsiyat wa Qadaya [Women Pioneers of the Twentieth Century: Critical Essays] (in Arabic). Cairo: The Women and Memory Forum.
- Sadda, Hoda (2004). 'A'isha Taymur: tahadiyyat al-thabit wal mutaghayir fil qarn al tasi' 'ashar [Aisha Taymur: Challenges of Change and Continuity in the Nineteenth Century] (in Arabic). Cairo: The Women and Memory Forum.
- Sadda, Hoda (2007). Al-Fatah li Sahibatiha Hind Nawfal 1892-1892 (in Arabic). Cairo: The Women and Memory Forum.
- Sadda, Hoda (2010). 'Intaj al-Ma'rifa 'an al-'Alam al-'Arabi [Mapping the Production of Knowledge on the Arab World. Proceedings of a conference held in Cairo in July 2007] (in Arabic). Cairo: The Supreme Council of Culture.

=== Book chapters ===
- Elsadda, Hoda (2024). "Feminist Lives: Contestation, Erasure and Dissonant Memories". In Meyer, Katrin (ed.). Revisioning Democracy and Women's Suffrage: Critical Feminist Interventions. Zurich: Seismo Press. pp. 29–48.
- Elsadda, Hoda (2022). "An Archive of Hope: Translating Memories of Revolution". In Deane-Cox, Sharon; Spiessens, Anneleen (eds.). The Routledge Handbook of Translation and Memory. London: Routledge. pp. 315–324.
- Elsadda, Hoda (2015). "An Archive of Hope: Translating Memories of Revolution". In Baker, Mona (ed.). Translating Dissent: Voices from and with the Egyptian Revolution. London: Routledge.
- Elsadda, Hoda (2014). "Gender Studies in the Arab World: Reflections and Questions on the Challenges of Discourses, Locations and History". In Makdisi, Jean Said (ed.). Arab Feminisms: Gender and Equality in the Middle East. London: I.B. Tauris.
- Elsadda, Hoda (2008). "Egypt". In Ashour, Radwa; Ghazoul, Ferial J.; Reda-Mekdashi, Hasna (eds.). Arab Women Writers: A Critical Reference Guide, 1873–1999. Mandy McClure (translator). Cairo: American University in Cairo Press. pp. 98–161. ISBN 9789774161469.

=== Articles ===
- Elsadda, Hoda (2024). "The Imaginable Archive: Rewriting the Historical Canon from a Feminist Perspective". Genesis. XXIII (1).
- Elsadda, Hoda (2023). "Critique voyageuse: l'anti-impérialisme, le genre et les droits". Alternatives Sud. 30: 147–164.
- Elsadda, Hoda (2019). "Women in Modern Egypt". Oxford Research Encyclopedia of African History. Oxford University Press.
- Elsadda, Hoda (2019). "Against All Odds: Arab Feminisms in Postcolonial States: A Legacy of Appropriation, Contestation and Negotiation". Journal of Feminist Scholarship (16).
- Elsadda, Hoda (2018). "Traveling Critique: Anti-imperialism, Gender and Rights Discourses". Feminist Dissent (3): 88–113.
- Elsadda, Hoda (2011). "Women's Rights Activism in post-Jan25 Egypt: Combating the Shadow of the First Lady Syndrome". Middle East Law and Governance. 3: 84–93.
- Sada, Huda (1999). "al-Mar'a wa al-Thakira: Hoda Elsadda Muqabala" [Women and memory (an interview with Hoda Elsadda)]. Alif: Journal of Comparative Poetics (19): 210–230. doi:10.2307/521935. JSTOR 521935.
- Elsadda, Hoda (2006). "Gendered citizenship: discourses on domesticity in the second half of the nineteenth century". Hawwa: Journal of Women of the Middle East and the Islamic World. 4 (1): 1–28. doi:10.1163/156920806777504562.
- Elsadda, Hoda (Spring 2007). "Imaging the "new man": gender and nation in Arab literary narratives in the early twentieth century". Journal of Middle East Women's Studies. 3 (2): 31–55. doi:10.2979/mew.2007.3.2.31. JSTOR 10.2979/mew.2007.3.2.31.
- Elsadda, Hoda; Moghissi, Haideh; Valassopoulos, Anastasia (August 2010). "Dialogue section: Arab feminist research and activism: bridging the gap between the theoretical and the practical". Feminist Theory. 11 (2): 121–127. doi:10.1177/1464700110366803. S2CID 144009127.
- Elsadda, Hoda (2010). "Arab women bloggers: the emergence of literary counterpublics". Middle East Journal of Culture and Communication. 3 (3): 312–332. doi:10.1163/187398610X538678.
- Elsadda, Hoda (June 2011). "A 'phantom freedom in a phantom modernity'? Protestant missionaries, domestic ideology and narratives of modernity in an Arab context". Rethinking History: The Journal of Theory and Practice. 15 (2): 209–228. doi:10.1080/13642529.2011.564821. S2CID 144017778.

== See also ==
- Arabic Literature
- Human Rights
- Egypt
- Women in Islam
- Women in Arab societies
- Gender Studies
