= Sheikh Nasser Bin Muhammad Al-Sabah Professor in International Relations =

The Sheikh Nasser Bin Muhammad Al-Sabah Chair in International Relationships is a professorship or chair in the Institute for Middle East and Islamic Studies, which forms part of the School of Government and International Affairs at Durham University. The chair is named after the former Prime Minister of Kuwait Sheikh Nasser Mohammed Al-Ahmed Al-Sabah, who originally endowed the chair in 2011.

== List of Al-Sabah Professors ==
2011–Present Professor Anoush Ehteshami

== See also ==
- Durham University
- Centre for the Advanced Study of the Arab World
