= WMF =

WMF may refer to:

== Organisations ==
- Wikimedia Foundation, an American non-profit foundation that supports the Wikimedia wikis, including Wikipedia
- Windhoeker Maschinenfabrik, a Namibian armoured vehicle producer
- Women and Memory Forum, a women's rights organisation based in Egypt
- World Minifootball Federation, an authority of minifootball
- World Minigolfsport Federation, a federation of miniature golf associations
- World Monuments Fund, an international historic preservation organization
- WMF Group, a German tableware manufacturer

== Computing ==
- Windows Metafile, an image file format originally designed for Microsoft Windows
- Windows Media Foundation
