= Faggala =

Faggala الفجّالة
- district
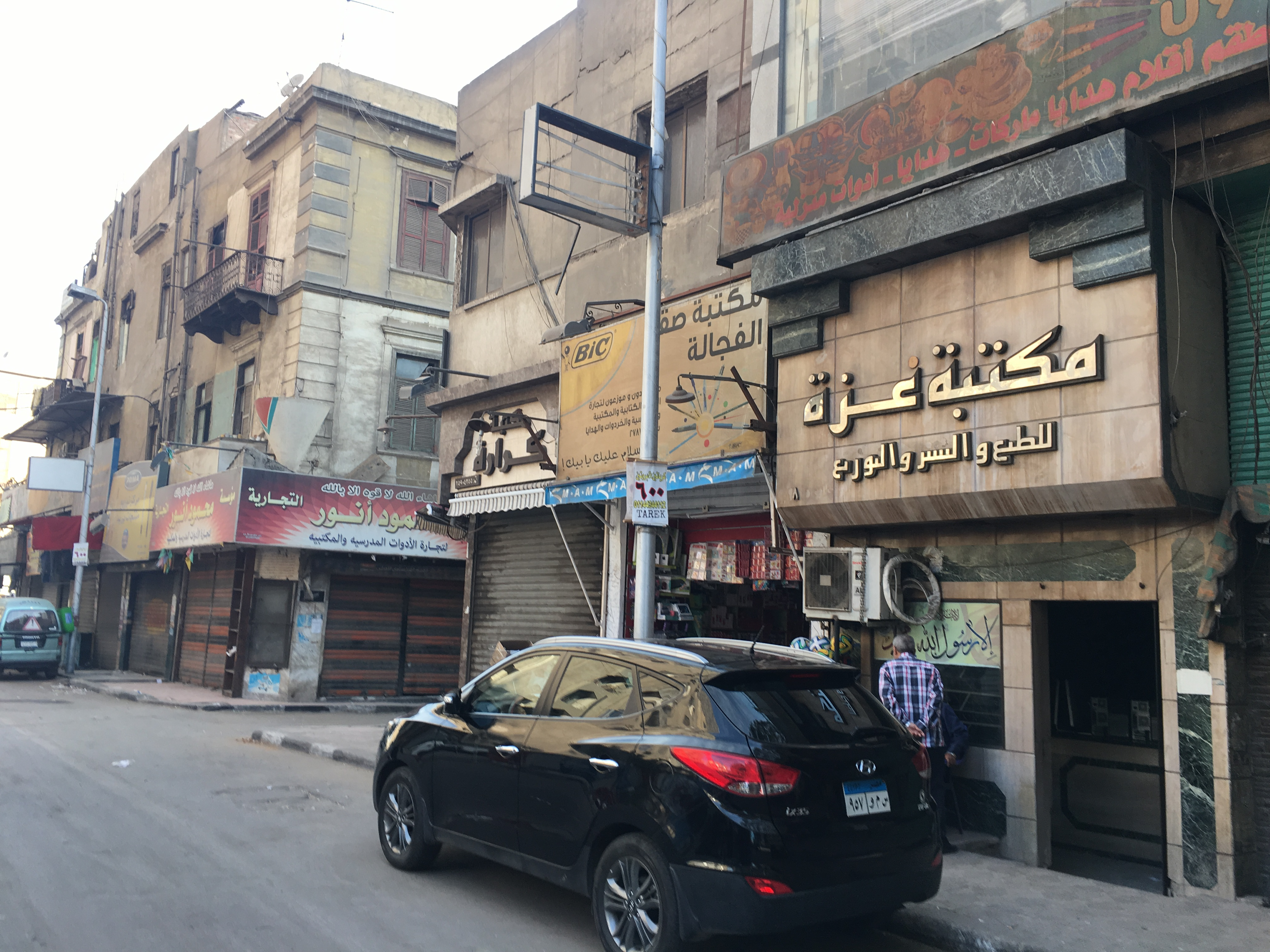
- A street in Faggala
- Interactive map of Faggala
- Coordinates: 30°03′37″N 31°15′15″E
- Country: Egypt
- Governorate: Cairo Governorate
- City: Cairo
- Time zone: UTC+2 (EET)
  - Summer (DST): UTC+3 (EEST)

Faggala (Arabic: الفجّالة) is a district of Cairo, Egypt near Ramesis Square. It is one of the oldest districts in the city. It has long been an important center for book publishing, perhaps the largest in the country. It was also known for its major bookstores but from the 1960s on these were sold to new tenants who opened the ceramics businesses found there today. During the early 20th century it became a center for the film industry and the famous Studio Nasibian was located there.

It is also an important religious center for the Coptic Orthodox Church of Egypt.

== Notable people ==
- Geneviève Baqtar Sydarous (1925–2016), journalist and translator
