= List of chancellors of Durham University =

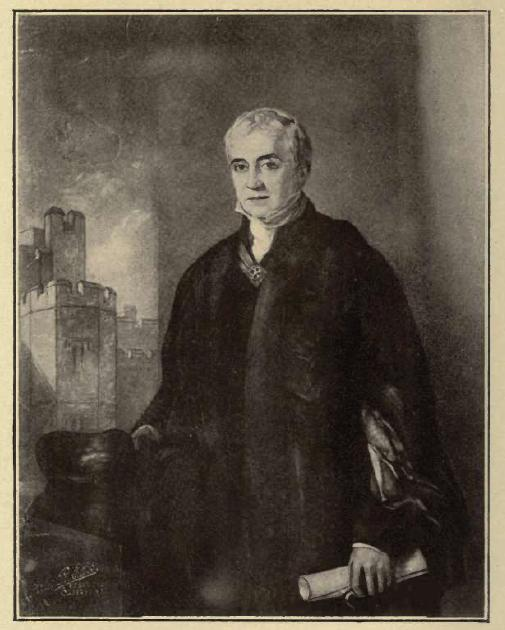
The Venerable Charles Thorp, in robes as Warden of the University of Durham at the Great Hall of University College, Durham

The chancellor is the ceremonial head of Durham University, with the formal duties of conferring degrees at congregations and of being an ambassador for the university. They are nominated by the council and senate in joint session and appointed by convocation, determined by the majority of votes of members of congregation present and voting. The incumbent is Fiona Hill, who was appointed by convocation in November 2022 and installed in June 2023.

Until 1909, the university was governed by the dean and chapter of Durham Cathedral, with the warden (held ex officio by the Dean of Durham from 1862) being both the formal and executive head of the university. Following the implementation of statutes made in 1909 under the University of Durham Act 1908, the warden became the chancellor with the sub-warden becoming the vice-chancellor, meaning Durham was, like most other British universities, headed by a chancellor.

== Chronological list ==
Year	Warden
1832	Charles Thorp (Archdeacon of Durham, Master of University College) (Note: The university was established with the warden as its head to be held ex officio by the dean of Durham Cathedral. The dean, John Jenkinson, declined to be the first warden, so the archdeacon, Charles Thorp, took on the office. Thereafter, the office was held by the dean.)
1862	George Waddington
1869	William Lake
1894	George William Kitchin (later as Chancellor of the University of Durham from 1909)

Year	Chancellor
1909	George William Kitchin (Dean of Durham, Warden of the University of Durham since 1894)
1913	Henry Percy, 7th Duke of Northumberland (Lord High Steward; Treasurer of the Household)
1919	John Lambton, 3rd Earl of Durham (Lord High Steward)
1929	Alan Percy, 8th Duke of Northumberland (Lord Lieutenant of Northumberland; Treasurer of the Household)
1931	Charles Vane-Tempest-Stewart, 7th Marquess of Londonderry (Lord Keeper of the Privy Seal in 1935)
1950	G. M. Trevelyan
1958	Roger Lumley, 11th Earl of Scarbrough
1971	Malcolm MacDonald
1981	Dame Margot Fonteyn de Arias (first non-royal female chancellor of a British university)
1992	Peter Ustinov
2005	Bill Bryson
2012	Thomas Allen
2023	Fiona Hill

== See also ==
- List of vice-chancellors and wardens of Durham University
- List of Durham University people
- History of Durham University
