= Asma Halim =

- Born: Asma; 1921
- Citizenship: Egypt
- Occupations: Journalist; Writer
- Notable work: Hikayat 'Abdu 'Abd al-Rahman

Asma Halim (1921–2003) was an Egyptian writer and journalist.

== Work ==
Halim often used "autobiographical styles and techniques" in her writing and was critical of cultural practices, such as polygamy. Hoda Elsadda describes how Halim worked on Hikayat 'Abdu 'Abd al-Rahman (1977) and wrote it as if it was a memoir, taking dictation from a fictional person. The story involves the life of 'Abdu, who is a working class person living in poverty who is oppressed in many different ways. Hanan Hammad, on the other hand, believes another interpretation of the novel, Hikayat, where Halim is the editor of a story dictated to her.

Halim also worked as a journalist.
