= Anoushiravan Ehteshami =

Anoushiravan "Anoush" Ehteshami (Persian: انوشیروان احتشامی) is the Professor and was Joint Director of the ESRC Centre for the Advanced Study of the Arab World at Durham University.

Ehteshami is the Nasser al-Mohammad al-Sabah Chair in International Relations and Director of the HH Sheikh Nasser al-Mohammad al-Sabah Programme in International Relations, Regional Politics and Security. He was also Joint Director of the RCUK-the funded center of excellence, the Durham-Edinburgh-Manchester Universities’ Centre for the Advanced Study of the Arab World (CASAW), whose research focus since 2012 has been on the ‘Arab World in Transition’. He was the University’s Dean of Internationalisation, 2009-2011 and was the founding Head of the School of Government and International Affairs at Durham University (2004-9).

He has been a Fellow of the World Economic Forum. He was Vice-President and Chair of the Council of the British Society for Middle Eastern Studies (BRISMES) 2000-2003. In addition to having published 21 books and monographs, he also has over 90 articles and edited volumes to his name.
