= Sharjah Professor in Islamic Law and Finance =

The Sharjah Chair in Islamic Law and Finance is a professorship or chair in the Institute for Middle East and Islamic Studies, which forms part of the School of Government and International Affairs at Durham University. The Chair is named after the Sharjah emirate whose Emir Sheikh Sultan bin Muhammad Al-Qasimi originally endowed the chair in 2008.

== List of Sharjah Professors ==
- 2008–Present Professor Habib Ahmed

== See also ==
- Durham University
- Van Mildert Professor of Divinity
- Lightfoot Professor of Divinity
