= Centre for the Advanced Study of the Arab World =

UK research initiative

The Centre for the Advanced Study of the Arab World (CASAW)
- Active: 2006–2016
- Affiliations: University of Edinburgh; University of Durham; University of Manchester (phase I) and University of Oxford (phase II)
- Director: Dr. Elisabeth Kendall
- Co-Directors: Prof. Hoda Elsadda (Manchester); Prof. Anoush Ehteshami (Durham) Prof. Paul Starkey (Durham)
- Location: Edinburgh, Durham, Manchester and Oxford, United Kingdom
- Website: http://www.casaw.ac.uk/

The Centre for the Advanced Study of the Arab World (CASAW) (Arabic: مركز الدراسات المتقدمة للعالم العربي) was a research based initiative which described itself as at the forefront of UK expertise in the Arab world. It was funded by the British government.

== Foundation ==
CASAW is the result of a UK government initiative to build crucial expertise on the Arab World based on a knowledge of the Arabic language coupled with advanced research methods skills in the social and political sciences, arts and humanities.

The Centre was a collaborative initiative between the Universities of Edinburgh, Durham, and Manchester, and was funded by the joint government research councils, with an initial grant of £5 million. CASAW was one of the five inter-institutional Centres of Excellence set up as part of the ESRC, AHRC, SFC and HEFCE's Language Based Area Studies Initiative. CASAW brought together some 50 full-time members of staff and postdoctoral fellows drawn from a variety of departments in the arts, humanities and social and political sciences, all working on areas directly related to the Arabic speaking world.

Following the expiry of the initial 2006–2012 grant, two more grants for the second phase of CASAW were issued to the University of Edinburgh in collaboration with academics at Durham University and the University of Oxford covering 2012–2015 and 2014–2016.

== Objectives ==
CASAW's aim is to "serve national strategic interests by safeguarding the future health of Arab World expertise in the UK, training the next generation of academics and providing a vital flow of expertise to sustain the needs of the public and private sectors"

Additionally, the creation of what it describes as the UK's leading resource for Arab World expertise, the creation of opportunities for academic cooperation and collaboration, as well as the creation of a world class cadre of researchers are key aims.

== Master's and doctoral programmes ==
CASAW offers a number of 2 year Master's and 4-year PhD awards. Regardless of the end qualification, all students who do not yet have Arabic expertise undertake a specially designed, intensive, one-year course in Arabic language ab initio at the University of Edinburgh. This consists of a full academic year at the University of Edinburgh, followed by four months of language training in an Arab World university in order to develop Arabic language ability. During this time, students undertake qualitative, quantitative, and area-specific advanced research methods at the University of Edinburgh.

Master's students continue intensive Arabic tuition in their second year, and undertake additional modules at their host institution, as well as beginning dissertations.

PhD students are placed in the institution most appropriate for the supervision of their specific project, yet also benefit from some cross-institutional supervision. During the remaining 3 years of their course, PhD candidates continue to receive language tuition and are expected to conduct 12 months of fieldwork in the Arab World.

== Other activities ==
In addition to its academic obligations, CASAW undertakes a number other activities, including consultancy to government, media, and business, tailor made language programmes for public and private sector users, and flagship events. These events have included a partnership with the Royal Society of Edinburgh to present the lecture series entitled "Perspectives on the Arab World", a Careers Workshop for students of Arabic throughout the UK, an Islamic finance summer school, as well as numerous one day symposia, film showings, discussion groups and addresses from eminent politicians and public figures, as well as conferences, such as the international conference on "Re-Thinking Jihad" held 7–9 September 2009.
