= Women and Memory Forum =

The Women and Memory Forum (WMF) was founded in 1997 in Cairo, Egypt. The members are women academics, researchers and activists, trying to improve the weak position of Arab women in their culture. WMF "research projects touch upon gendered representations in different historical periods with the aim of challenging some of these representations as well as producing alternative knowledge that could be used for advocating women's rights issues in contemporary Arab societies. "Founded in 1997, Women and Memory Forum (WMF) uses art, research and literature to challenge traditional gender norms and cultural biases against women in current Arab societies. The group provides a crucial space for Egyptian women to come together and discuss cinema, feminist literature and produce creative publications."

== Vision ==
"The WMF looks forward to a society in which justice and equal opportunities for men and women would prevail, a vibrant society capable of constantly producing alternative knowledge in order to reshape power relations within the different social structures in such a way that would support and maintain human dignity in the face of all forms of discrimination."

== Goals ==
Research

Capacity Building

Advocacy

== Programs ==
- The Gender Education Workshops
- The Translated Readers on gender in the social sciences and humanities
- "Who is She", a database of contemporary experts
- The Women's voices and archives
- Storytelling
- Commemorative conferences to revive the cultural memory of the intellectual and activist role played by Arab women pioneers.

== WMLDC ==
The Women and Memory Library and Documentation Centre (WMLDC) (in cooperation with the Egyptian Consortium of Academic and Research Libraries in Egypt (EUL) h .

== Publications ==
- Feminist translations
- Conference Proceedings
- Republished Works by Pioneering Women: "The Women and Memory Forum has republished the memoirs and writings of pioneer Egyptian women to demonstrate that women have been active publicly, have written from their vantage points and have been feminists. Such research and advocacy efforts show that feminist perspectives and demands were integral to Arab history".
- Short Stories
- Children’s Stories
- Occasional Papers—research papers on Arab and Islamic cultural history, feminist theories and revising history.
- Illustrated books
- Women’s Voices Series
