= List of Old Salopians =

List of Old Salopians is a list of some of the many notable old boys of Shrewsbury School, a leading UK independent boarding and day school in Shrewsbury, in Shropshire, England.

== A ==
- Harold Ackroyd VC MC (1877–1917), soldier and recipient of the Victoria Cross
- Francis William Lauderdale Adams (1862–1893), writer
- Sir James Adams KCMG (1932–2020), ambassador to Tunisia (1984–1987) and Egypt (1987–1992)
- John Adams (before 1670−1738), cartographer
- Sir Thomas Adams, 1st Baronet (1586–1668), Lord Mayor of the City of London 1654–65
- Sir John Lawson Andrews KBE DL PC (1903–1986), Deputy Prime Minister of Northern Ireland and son of Prime Minister John Miller Andrews
- John Langshaw Austin (1911–1960), philosopher of language, White's Professor of Moral Philosophy

== B ==
- Alan Barber (1905–1985), cricketer and headmaster of Ludgrove
- Robert Bardsley CMG OBE (1890–1952), cricketer and colonial administrator
- Edward Barnard (1992–), cricketer
- Mike Barnard (1990–), cricketer
- Sir Alexander Fitzwilliam Barrington, 7th Baronet (1909–2003), landowner
- Douglas Bartles-Smith (1937–2014), priest and Archdeacon of Southwark 1985–2004
- William Henry Bateson (1812–1881), scholar and Master of St. John's College, Cambridge 1857–1881
- Sir Cecil Beadon KCSI (1816–1880), administrator in India
- Andrew Berry (born 1963), evolutionary biologist and historian of science at Harvard
- Nick Bevan (1942–2014), rowing coach
- Henry Edward James Bevan FRSL (1854–1935), Archdeacon of Middlesex
- Peter Blagg (1918–1943), cricketer and soldier
- David Blakely, murder victim; shot dead by Ruth Ellis, the last woman to be hanged in Britain
- Peter Renshaw Blaker, Baron Blaker KCMG PC (1922–2009), politician
- The Ven. Charles Blakeway (1868–1922), Archdeacon of Stafford 1911–22
- Omar 'Ali Bolkiah (born 1986), prince of the Sultanate of Brunei
- Christopher Booker (1937–2019), journalist, co-founder of Private Eye
- Tim Booth (1960–), lead singer of the band James
- Colin Boumphrey DFC (1897–1945), cricketer and Royal Air Force officer
- Donald Boumphrey MC (1892–1971), cricketer, educator and British Army officer
- Sir James Bourne, 1st Baronet (1812–1882), politician
- Piers Brendon (born 1940), historian
- John Breynton (1719–1799), minister and missionary in Nova Scotia
- Lieutenant General Sir Harold Bridgwood Walker KCB KCMG DSO (1862–1934), senior British Army commander
- Mynors Bright (1818–1883), academic and Master of Magdalene College, Cambridge
- John Brockbank (1848–1896), footballer who played for England as a forward in the first international match against Scotland
- Peter Brown FBA (born 1935), historian of Late Antiquity, Fellow of All Souls College, Oxford
- Lieutenant-Colonel Barwick Sharpe Browne (1881–1963), officer and librarian in the Institute of Archaeology
- Samuel Browne (1574/5–1632), Church of England clergyman
- Samuel Hawksley Burbury FRS (1831–1911), mathematician
- Robert Burn (1829–1904), classical scholar, archeologist and Fellow of Trinity College, Cambridge
- Charles Burney FRS (1726–1814), musician, composer, music historian
- John Burrell (1910–1972), theatre director
- John Burrough (1873–1922), cricketer
- Samuel Butler (1835–1902), iconoclastic author of Erewhon and The Way of All Flesh

== C ==
- Sir Edward John Cameron KCMG (1858–1947), British colonial administrator, Governor of Gambia 1914–1920
- Sir Philip Montgomery Campbell FRSA FInstP (born 1951), Editor-in-Chief of Nature
- Sir Frederick Catherwood (1925–2015), politician, writer, and vice-president of European Parliament
- Jamie Catto (born 1968), economist and programmer
- Bruce Clark (1958–), journalist and author
- George Sidney Roberts Kitson Clark (1900–1975), historian
- Miles Clark (1960–1993), author, journalist and explorer
- William George Clark (1821–1878), literary and classical scholar
- William Clarke (1695–1771), antiquary
- Rowland Clegg-Hill, 3rd Viscount Hill (1833–1895), politician
- Lieutenant-General Sir Skipton Hill Climo KCB DSO (1868−1937)
- Richard Charles Cobb CBE (1917–1996), historian and essayist
- Edward Meredith Cope (1818–1873), classical scholar
- Edward Corbet (died 1658), Anglican clergyman
- Athelstan John Cornish-Bowden (1943–), biochemist
- Sir Robert Salusbury Cotton, 5th Baronet (1739–1809), MP for Cheshire 1780–1796
- Sir Randolph Crewe (also Crew) (bap. 1559, d. 1646), judge
- Sir Julian Critchley (1930–2000), journalist and politician
- Henry Page Croft, 1st Baron Croft CMG TD (1881–1947), Conservative politician
- Assheton Henry Cross, 3rd Viscount Cross (1920–2004), racing driver and soldier
- John Cuckney, Baron Cuckney (1925–2008), industrialist, civil servant, and peer
- Francis Hovell-Thurlow-Cumming-Bruce, 8th Baron Thurlow KCMG (1912–2013), diplomat
- Roualeyn Cumming-Bruce PC (1912–2000), judge

== D ==
- Charles Darwin FRS FRGS FLS FZS (1809–1882), naturalist, geologist, and originator of the theory of natural selection
- Peter Davis (born 1941), businessman, former chairman of Sainsbury's
- William Davison, 1st Baron Broughshane KBE FSA JP DL (1872–1953), politician and MP for Kensington South
- Francis Day CIE (1829–1889), military surgeon and ichthyologist
- Paul Edward Dehn (1912–1976), writer and film critic
- Charles Spencer Denman, 5th Baron Denman, 2nd Baronet CBE MC TD (1916–2012), businessman and peer
- General Sir Miles Christopher Dempsey GBE KCB DSO MC (1896–1969), D-Day 2nd Army Commander
- Hal Dixon (1928–2008), biochemist and Vice Provost of King's College, Cambridge
- Cyril Henty-Dodd (1935–2009), interviewer and radio disc jockey, commonly known as Simon Dee
- John Freeman Milward Dovaston (1782–1854), naturalist and poet
- Andrew Downes (c. 1549 – 1628), Greek scholar
- Sir Henry Edward Leigh Dryden, 4th Baronet of Ambrosden, 7th Baronet of Canons-Ashby (1818–1899), archaeologist and antiquary
- Sir Thomas Dunlop, 3rd Baronet OStJ (1912–1999), Scottish businessman

== E ==
- Humphrey Edwards (1582–1658), politician and regicide of King Charles I
- Alexander John Ellis FRS (1814–1890), phonetician and mathematician
- Charles Evans (1918–1995), surgeon and mountaineer
- Canon Thomas Saunders Evans (1816–1889), Latin scholar and poet, was schoolmaster at Rugby and Durham
- William Addams Williams Evans (1853–1919), international footballer
- Walter Ewbank (1918–2014), priest and author

== F ==
- Edmund Ffoulkes (1820–1894), clergyman
- George Fielding DSO (1915–2005), Major in the SOE
- Frederick Fisher (born 1985), Big Brother 10 contestant
- Ronald Fletcher (1910–1996), radio announcer and newsreader
- Paul Foot (1937–2004), journalist, co-founder of Private Eye
- Nigel Forman (1943–2017), Conservative politician, MP for Carshalton and Wallington
- William Orme Foster (1814–1899), ironmaster, MP for South Staffordshire 1857–1868, owner of Apley Hall
- James Fraser (1818–1885), bishop of Manchester
- Abraham Fraunce (France) (born c. 1558–1560, died 1592/3), poet and lawyer

== G ==
- William Garnett (1816–1903), cricketer and clergyman
- David Gay MC (1920–2010), British Army officer awarded the Military Cross in World War II, cricketer, and educator
- Edwin Gifford (1820–1905), Anglican priest and author
- Arthur Herman Gilkes (1849–1922), Headmaster of Dulwich College
- George Gore (1675–1753), landowner and Attorney-General for Ireland
- Richard Goulding, actor
- Geoffrey Green (1911–1990), football writer
- Fulke Greville, 1st Baron Brooke, 13th Baron Latimer and 5th Baron Willoughby de Broke KB PC of Beauchamps Court (1554–1628), courtier and author
- Sir George Abraham Grierson OM KCIE (1851–1941), administrator in India and philologist
- Lawrence Grossmith (1877–1944), actor
- Henry Melvill Gwatkin (1844–1916), historian and theologian
- Lieutenant General Willoughby Gwatkin KCMG CB (1859–1925), officer and Chief of the General Staff of the Canadian Militia

== H ==
- Nick Hancock (born 1962), actor and TV presenter
- John Hanmer (1574–1629), bishop of St Asaph
- Gathorne Gathorne-Hardy, 1st Earl of Cranbrook GCSI PC (1814–1906), politician
- Sir Jack Ashford Harris, 2nd Baronet (1906–2009), businessman
- Sir Paul Harris, 2nd Baronet (1595–1644), politician and Surveyor of the Ordnance
- Thomas Emerson Headlam (1813–1875), barrister and politician
- Sir Denis Maurice Henry QC (1931–2010), barrister and Lord Justice of Appeal
- William Henry Herford (1820–1908), educationist
- Michael Heseltine CH PC (born 1933), Conservative politician, Deputy Prime Minister 1995–1997
- Major Richard Henry Heslop DSO (alias Xavier) (1907–1973), army officer and resistance organiser
- Sir Thomas Hewet (1656–1726), architect and landowner
- Edward Hewetson (1902–1977), cricketer
- Sir John Tomlinson Hibbert KCB PC JP DL (1824–1908), politician
- Horatio Hildyard (1805–1886), cricketer and clergyman
- James Hildyard (1809–1887), classical scholar
- Sir Richard Hill, 2nd Baronet of Hawkstone (1732–1808), Tory MP and religious revivalist
- Richard Hillary (1919–1943), RAF officer and author
- John Hirsch (1883–1958), South African cricketer and rugby union international
- Hubert Ashton Holden (1822–1896), classical scholar
- Edward Hopkins (1600–1657), politician and Governor of Connecticut
- Francis Hovell-Thurlow-Cumming-Bruce, 8th Baron Thurlow KCMG (1912–2013), diplomat and colonial governor
- Sir James Roualeyn Hovell-Thurlow-Cumming-Bruce (1912–2000), barrister and Lord Justice of Appeal
- William Walsham How (1823–1897), bishop of Wakefield
- Robert Hudson (1920–2010), BBC broadcaster and administrator
- James Humphreys (1768–1830), law reformer
- Sir Travers Humphreys (1867–1956), barrister judge
- David Lafayette Hunter MC (1919–2001), officer

== I ==
- William Inge (1829–1903), cricketer, clergyman and Provost of Worcester College, Oxford
- Brian St John Inglis (1916–1993), journalist
- Richard Ingrams (born 1939), journalist, co-founder of Private Eye
- Andrew Irvine (1902–1924), mountaineer

== J ==
- Frederick John Jackson, KCMG CB (1860–1929), Governor of Uganda (1911–1918) and naturalist
- Sir William Godfrey Fothergill Jackson, GBE KCB MC (1917–1999), army officer, military historian, and Governor of Gibraltar
- George Jeffreys, 1st Baron Jeffreys (1645–1689), judge
- Vice Admiral Clive Carruthers Johnstone (born 1963), Royal Navy Officer
- Basil Jones (1822–1897), bishop of St David's
- John Jones of Gellilyfdy (c. 1578 – c. 1658), copyist and manuscript collector
- Sir Thomas Jones (1614–1692), judge and law reporter
- Thomas Jones (1756–1807), academic and Head Tutor at Trinity College, Cambridge

== K ==
- George Kemp, 1st Baron Rochdale CB (1866–1945), politician, businessman, soldier and cricketer
- Benjamin Hall Kennedy (1804–1889), headmaster and classical scholar
- Charles Rann Kennedy (1808–1867), lawyer and classical scholar
- Francis King CBE (1923–2011), novelist and poet
- Sir Harold Baxter Kittermaster KCMG KBE (1879–1939), governor of British Somaliland 1926–31, British Honduras 1932–34 and the Nyasaland protectorate 1934-39

== L ==
- Richard Cornthwaite Lambert (1868–1939), barrister and politician
- John Heath Lander (1907–1941), Olympic rower and soldier
- Geoffrey Lane, Baron Lane AFC PC QC (1918–2005), Lord Chief Justice of England and Wales
- Sir John Langford-Holt (1916–1993), politician and MP for Shrewsbury 1945–83
- Richard Law, 1st Baron Coleraine PC (1901–1980), politician and son of Prime Minister Bonar Law
- Aubrey Trevor Lawrence MBE KC (1875–1930), barrister and author
- Sir William Lawrence, 3rd Baronet (1870–1934), English horticulturalist and hospital administrator
- Sir Martin Le Quesne KCMG (1917–2004), diplomat, ambassador to Mali and Algeria, high commissioner to Nigeria
- Steve Leach (born 1993), cricketer
- Blessed Richard Leigh (1557–1588), beatified English Catholic priest
- Sir Charlton Leighton, 4th Baronet (1747–1784), politician and owner of Loton Park
- Sir William Leighton (c. 1565–1622), poet and composer
- Alexander Loveday (1888–1962), economist and Warden of Nuffield College, Oxford
- Very Rev Herbert Mortimer Luckock (1833–1909), Dean of Lichfield
- General Sir Daniel Lysons GCB (1816–1898), army officer

== M ==
- Humphrey Mackworth (1603–1654), member of Shropshire parliamentary committee in English Civil War, governor of Shrewsbury, member of Protector's Council, MP
- Humphrey Mackworth (born 1631), military governor of Shrewsbury under Protectorate, MP
- Thomas Mackworth (1627–1696), Parliamentarian soldier and MP
- Christopher MacLehose CBE (born 1940), publisher
- Richard Madox (1546–1583), Church of England clergyman and diarist
- Harry Mallaby-Deeley (1863–1937), politician, MP for Harrow and Willesden East
- Anthony Mangnall (born 1989), politician, MP for Totnes (2019-2024)
- George Augustus Chichester May PC QC (1815–1892), judge
- John Eyton Bickersteth Mayor FBA (1825–1910), classicist and librarian of Cambridge University
- Claas Mertens (born 1992), rower for the Germany national team
- Anthony Merryweather (born 1973), Musical Theatre producer and accompanist
- Robert Alexander Holt Methuen, 7th Baron Methuen (1931–2014), peer
- Sotherton Micklethwait (1823–1889), cricketer and clergyman
- Terry Milewski (born 1949), journalist
- Sir Mark Moody-Stuart KCMG (born 1940), ex-chairman of Royal Dutch Shell and chairman of UN Global Compact Committee
- Sir George Osborne Morgan, 1st Baronet PC QC (1826–1897), lawyer and politician
- Henry Arthur Morgan (1830–1912), academic and Master of Jesus College, Cambridge
- Francis Morse (1818–1886), priest
- Sydney Morse (1854–1929), rugby player
- Henry Whitehead Moss (1841–1917), headmaster 1866–190
- Gerard Moultrie (1829–1885), third master, chaplain, hymnographer
- Douglas Muggeridge (1928–1985), Controller, BBC Radio 1 between 1968 and 1976
- Hugh Andrew Johnstone Munro (1819–1885), classical scholar
- General Sir Geoffrey Musson GCB CBE DSO (1910–2008), officer and Adjutant-General to the Forces

== N ==
- William Napper (1880–1967), Irish cricketer and British Army officer
- The Very Rev. Stephen Nason (1901–1975), priest
- Robert Needham, 1st Viscount Kilmorey (1565–1631), politician
- Christopher Nevinson ARA (1889–1946), artist
- Henry Woodd Nevinson (1856–1941), social activist and journalist
- Sir Charles Thomas Newton KCB (1816–1894), archaeologist
- Nevil Shute Norway (1899–1960), novelist as Nevil Shute and aeronautical engineer
- John Nottingham (1928–2018), colonial administrator and politician

== O ==
- Sir Charles Oakeley, 1st Baronet (1751–1826), administrator in India
- William Oakley (1873–1934), footballer for England
- William Chichester O'Neill, 1st Baron O'Neill (1813–1883), Church of Ireland clergyman and composer
- Julian Orchard (1930–1979), film and television actor
- Sir Roger Ormrod PC (1911–1992), judge, Lord Justice of Appeal
- Sir Francis Ottley (1601–1649), royalist politician and soldier, military governor of Shrewsbury
- Richard Ottley (1626–1670), royalist soldier and Restoration MP

== P ==
- Thomas Ethelbert Page CH (1850–1936), classicist
- General Sir Bernard Charles Tolver Paget GCB DSO MC (1887–1961), army officer
- Edward Francis Paget (1886–1971), Archbishop of Central Africa
- Francis Paget (1851–1911), 33rd Bishop of Oxford
- Luke Paget (1853–1937), 34th Bishop of Chester
- Stephen Paget (1855–1926), writer and pro-vivisection campaigner
- Frederick Apthorp Paley (1815–1888), classical scholar and writer
- Sir Michael Palin CBE FRGS (born 1943), member of Monty Python comedy troupe, writer, actor and world traveller
- John Parker Ravenscroft (1939–2004), DJ and journalist, known professionally as John Peel
- Sir Nicholas Penny FBA FSA (born 1949), art historian and Director of the National Gallery
- Lieutenant General Sir Arthur Purves Phayre GCMG KCSI CB (1812–1885), British Indian Army officer; 1st Commissioner of British Burma (1862–1867) and Governor of Mauritius (1874–1878)
- General Sir Robert Phayre GCB, ADC (1820–1897).
- Ambrose Philips (1674–1749), poet and playwright
- John Arthur Pilcher GCMG (1912–1990), diplomat, ambassador to Austria (1965–67), ambassador to Japan (1967–1972)
- Nick Pocock (born 1951), cricketer
- Graham Pollard (1903–1976), bookseller and bibliographer
- Angus Pollock (born 1962), cricketer
- Henry Steven Potter (1904–1976), Chief Secretary of Uganda and Kenya, later British Resident in Zanzibar
- Sir Thomas Powys (1649–1719), MP, Attorney General to King James II, judge, and politician
- Michael Proctor (1950–), physicist, mathematician, academic and Provost of King's College, Cambridge

== R ==
- Henry Cecil Raikes PC (1838–1891), Conservative politician
- Richard Ramsbotham MBE (1880–1970), first-class cricketer and educator
- Sir Martin Rees, Baron Rees of Ludlow OM FRS FREng FMedSci FRAS (born 1942), British cosmologist and astrophysicist
- John Hamilton Reynolds (1794–1852), poet
- James Riddell (1823–1866), classical scholar and Fellow of Balliol College, Oxford
- George Rudé (1910–1993), British Marxist Historian
- Willie Rushton (1937–1996), cartoonist, comedian, co-founder of Private Eye

== S ==
- Colonel Thomas Sandys (1837–1911), officer and politician
- Clyde Sanger (born 1928), journalist and author, first Africa correspondent for The Guardian
- George Savile, 1st Marquess of Halifax PC DL FRS (1633–1695), statesman, writer, and politician
- John Sayer OBE (1920–2013), first-class cricketer and officer in the Fleet Air Arm and the Royal Navy
- Robert Gould Shaw III (1898–1970), American-born English socialite
- Desmond Shawe-Taylor (1907–1995), music critic
- Desmond Shawe-Taylor LVO (born 1955), art historian, Surveyor of the Queen's Pictures
- Richard Shilleto (1809–1876), classical scholar
- Nevil Shute (1899–1960), writer (and as Neville Shute Norway, an aeronautical engineer)
- Sir Philip Sidney (1554–1586), poet, courtier and soldier
- Robert Sidney, 1st Earl of Leicester (1529–1586), poet, courtier and politician
- Air Marshall Sir Michael Simmons KCB AFC (born 1937), Royal Air Force officer, Assistant Chief of the Air Staff
- Sandy Singleton (1914–1999), cricketer
- Sir Norman Skelhorn KBE QC (1909–1988), barrister and Director of Public Prosecutions for England and Wales 1964–77
- Sir Basil Smallpiece KCVO (1906–1992), businessman
- Martin Ferguson Smith OBE FSA (born 1940), scholar and writer, classics and ancient history professor at Durham
- Ruaidhri Smith (born 1994), Scottish cricketer
- Philip Snow (1907–1985), cricketer
- Sir Frederick Sprott (1863–1943), cricketer and engineer
- William Starkie (1860–1920), Greek scholar, translator of Aristophanes, and President of Queen's College, Galway
- Christopher Steel (1938–1992), composer of classical music
- Thomas Stevens FSA (1841–1920), Bishop of Barking
- Sir John Stuttard JP FCA (born 1945), Lord Mayor of the City of London 2006–07

== T ==
- James Taylor (1990–), cricketer
- John Taylor (1704–1766), classical scholar and Church of England clergyman
- John Taylor, Baron Ingrow OBE TD JP DL (1917–2002), soldier and politician
- Oliver Thomas (1599/1600–1652), nonconformist minister and author
- Percy Beart Thomas CIE (1866–1921), Inspector-General of Police of Madras
- Sir William Beach Thomas KBE (1868–1957), author and journalist
- William Thomson, FRS FRGS (1819–1890), Archbishop of York
- Godfrey Thring (1823–1903), hymn writer
- Henry Thring, 1st Baron Thring KBE (1818–1907), parliamentary draftsman
- J. C. Thring, notable figure in the early history of association football
- Lt Col. Alfred Tippinge (1817–1898), of the British Grenadiers; recipient of the Legion of Honour
- Robert Morton Tisdall (1907–2004), Olympic athlete
- Richard Todd, OBE (1919–2009), actor
- Anthony Chenevix-Trench (1919–1979), headmaster of Eton College and Fettes College
- Sir Thomas Trevor (1586–1656), judge
- Patrick Trimby (1972–), cricketer

== V ==
- Sir Harry Bevir Vaisey (1877–1965), High Court of Justice judge
- Sir William Vaughan (died 1649), royalist army officer
- Lieutenant-Colonel Francis William Voelcker CBE DSO MC (1896–1954), officer and High Commissioner of Western Samoa

== W ==
- Alan Wace (1879–1957), archaeologist at Cambridge University 1934-44 and professor at the Farouk I University in Egypt 1943–52
- Henry Wace (1853–1947), England international footballer
- Henry William Rawson Wade QC FBA (1918–2004), academic lawyer
- Christopher Wallace (British Army officer), 1943–2016
- Graham Wallas (1858–1932), political psychologist, leader of the Fabian Society and co-founder of the London School of Economics
- Sir Francis Bagott Watson KCVO FBA (1907–1992), art historian
- John Weaver (1673–1760), dancer and choreographer
- Stanley J. Weyman (1855–1928), novelist
- Sir Edgar Whitehead KCMG OBE (1905–1971), prime minister of Rhodesia
- Selby Whittingham (born 1941), art expert and author
- Charles Wicksteed (1810–1885), Unitarian minister
- Sir Kyffin Williams (1918–2006), Landscape & Portrait Artist
- Sir William Williams, 1st Baronet (1634–1700), lawyer and politician
- Major General Dare Wilson CBE MC (1919–2014), SAS officer who introduced attack helicopters to the British military
- Jack Wilson (1914–1997), Olympic rower
- H. de Winton, co-creator of the rules of football
- Samuel Woodhouse (1912–1995), priest and Archdeacon of London
- Frederic Charles Lascelles Wraxall, 3rd Baronet (1828–1865), writer
- Chandos Wren-Hoskyns JP DL (1812–1876), English landowner, agriculturist, politician and author
- Jonathan Wright (born 1953), journalist and literary translator
- John Wylie (1854–1924), 1878 FA Cup winner and England international

== Y ==
- Colonel Sir Charles Edward Yate, 1st Baronet CSI CMG (1849–1940), administrator in India and politician
