= 1929 New Year Honours =

Ceremonial recognition of outstanding British citizens

The 1929 New Year Honours were appointments by King George V to various orders and honours to reward and highlight good works by citizens of the United Kingdom and British Empire. They were announced on 26 February 1929. The announcement of the list was delayed two months by the health of the king, who fell ill with septicaemia in November 1928. There were no recipients of the Royal Victorian Order and only two recipients in the military division of the Order of the British Empire.

The recipients of honours are displayed here as they were styled before their new honour, and arranged by honour, with classes (Knight, Knight Grand Cross, etc.) and then divisions (Military, Civil, etc.) as appropriate.

== United Kingdom and Colonies ==
=== Baron ===
- Sir Jesse Boot Bt — For services in the promotion of education.
- Urban Huttleston Rogers Broughton. In consideration of the public, political and philanthropic services of his Father, the late Urban Hanlon Broughton, whose elevation to the Peerage would have been recommended to His Majesty but for his death on 30 January 1929.
- Sir Berkeley George Andrew Moynihan Bt KCMG CB MS FRCS President of the Royal College of Surgeons.

=== Privy Councillor ===
The King appointed the following to His Majesty's Most Honourable Privy Council:

- James Richard, Earl Stanhope DSO MC JP DL Civil Lord of the Admiralty since November, 1924.

=== Baronetcies ===
- Frederick Alfred Aykroyd. For political and public services. Member of the Council of Bradford Chamber of Commerce for sixteen years, being President in 1923.
- Friedrich Gustav Jonathan Eckstein, Chairman of the Sudan Plantations Syndicate. For services to the Sudan.
- Captain Sir (Francis) John Childs Ganzoni MP Member of Parliament for Ipswich, May, 1914 to December, 1923 and since October, 1924. For political and public services.
- William Edgar Horne. For public and political services. Chairman of the Prudential Assurance Company. Member of Parliament for Guildford, 1910–22.
- Alexander Park Lyle JP For services in connection with the Scottish National War Memorial.
- William Richard Morris, Governing Director of Morris Commercial Cars, Limited, chairman and managing director, of Morris Motors (1926) Limited.
- Charles Thomas-Stanford FSA JP For public services in Brighton and district.
- Frederick Charles Thomson KC MP Member of Parliament for South Aberdeen since 1918. Lord Commissioner of the Treasury, February to April, 1923, and November, 1924 to January, 1928. Solicitor General for Scotland, 1923–24. Vice-Chamberlain of the Household since January, 1928.
- Stanley William Tubbs JP For political and public services in Gloucestershire. Chairman of Mid-Gloucestershire Conservative and Unionist Association.

=== Knight Bachelor ===
- Alderman Charles Henry Booth JP For political and public services in Cheshire. Chairman of Stalybridge and Hyde Conservative and Unionist Association for over twenty-five years.
- His Honour Judge William Moore Cann, County Court Judge.
- Councillor William Cundiff JP For political and public services in Manchester.
- Stephen Easten OBE JP late Lord Mayor of Newcastle-upon-Tyne.
- Robert Charles Evans, Proprietor of The Teachers World.
- Walter Evans JP For political and public services in Birmingham.
- John Ambrose Fleming FRS Emeritus Professor of Electrical Engineering, University College, London.
- Carteret Ernest Fletcher, Controller of Death Duties, Board of Inland Revenue.
- James Hamilton JP Chairman, York Local Employment Committee.
- David Patrick Henderson JP DL For political and public services in Caithness and Sutherland.
- Edward John Holland JP DL Chairman of the Surrey County Council.
- Gerald Berkeley Hurst TD KC MP Member of Parliament for the Moss Side Division of Manchester, December, 1918 to 1923, and since October, 1924. For political and public services.
- John Jackson OBE Deputy Chief inspector of Factories, Home Office.
- Lieutenant-Colonel Cecil Bingham Levita CBE MVO JP DL For public and political services. Chairman of the London County Council.
- Albert Levy, Treasurer of the Royal Free Hospital. For benefactions.
- Lewis Lougher JP MP Member of Parliament for Cardiff East, November, 1922 to 1923, and for Cardiff Central, since October, 1924. For political services.
- Lieutenant-Colonel Kenyon Pascoe Vaughan-Morgan OBE DL MP Member of Parliament for East Fulham since 1922. For political and public services.
- William Thomas Paulin JP For long and valuable services to the London Hospital.
- Edgar Stroud Plummer. For political and public services in Devonshire.
- Harry Goring Pritchard, Secretary of the Association of Municipal Corporations.
- Colonel Thomas Fortune Purves OBE MIEE Engineer-in-Chief, Post Office.
- Gervais Squire Chittick Rentoul MP Member of Parliament for Lowestoft since November, 1922. For political and public services.
- Alliott Verdon Roe OBE For distinguished services to British aviation.
- William Gustavus Stanhope Rolleston JP DL For political and public services in Leicester.
- John Thomas Podger Rowland JP For political and public services in Hampshire.
- Lewis Shedden CBE JP For political and public services in Glasgow and the West of Scotland.
- Arthur Somervell lately Principal Inspector of Music to the Board of Education and to the Scottish Education Department.
- Robert Stewart JP For public services in Glasgow.
- Thomas Powell Thomas JP For political and public services in Glamorganshire.
- William Ernest Thompson JP President, Manchester Chamber of Commerce.

Dominions

- George Alfred Julius, Chairman of the Council for Scientific and Industrial Research, Commonwealth of Australia.
- The Honourable Norman William Kater, formerly Chairman of the Federal Pastoral Advisory Committee, Commonwealth of Australia.
- The Honourable Daniel Levy Speaker of the Legislative Assembly, State of New South Wales.
- Carrick Hey Robertson FRCS LRCP of the City of Auckland, Dominion of New Zealand.

British India

- Justice Courtney Terrell, Chief Justice, High Court of Judicature at Patna.
- Sardar Jogendra Singh, Minister for Agriculture, Punjab.
- Lee Ah Yain, Minister for Forests, Burma.
- Arthur Edward Nelson CIE OBE Indian Civil Service, Member of the Executive Council of the Governor of the Central Provinces.
- Justice Vepa Ramesam Pantulu, Puisne Judge of the High Court of Judicature at Madras.
- Osborne Arkell Smith, Managing Governor of the Imperial Bank of India.
- Maulvi Nizam-ud-Din Ahmad, Nawab Nizamat Jung Bahadur CIE OBE Sadr-ul-Maham, Political Department, H.E.H. the Nizam's Government, Hyderabad.
- Basil Eden Garth Eddis, Partner, Messrs. Gillanders, Arbuthnot and Company, Calcutta.
- Khan Bahadur Nasarvanji Hormasji Choksy CIE Medical Practitioner, Bombay.
- Khan Bahadur Nawab Arbab Dost Muhammad Khan OBE Honorary Magistrate and Provincial Durban, North-West Frontier Province.
- Hugh Golding Cocke JP MLA Chartered Accountant, Bombay.

Colonies, Protectorates, etc.

- Professor Augusto Bartolo Minister for Public Instruction, Migration and Labour, and Member of the Senate, Island of Malta.
- Lieutenant-Colonel James Forrest Halkett Carmichael CMG CBE MICE one of the Crown Agents for the Colonies, and Engineer-in-Chief.
- Arthur George Murchison Fletcher CMG CBE Colonial Secretary of Ceylon.
- George Henry Gamblin, Unofficial Member of the Executive Council and President of the Legislative Council, Bahama Islands.
- Manasseh Meyer, one of the recognised leaders of the Jewish community in the Straits Settlements. For charitable services.

=== The Most Honourable Order of the Bath ===
==== Knight Grand Cross of the Order of the Bath (GCB) ====
Military Division
Royal Navy

- Admiral Sir Osmond De Beauvoir Brock KCB KCMG KCVO

Army

- General Sir Walter Pipon Braithwaite KCB Aide-de-Camp General to The King, Adjutant-General to the Forces, The War Office.
- General Sir John Stuart Mackenzie Shea KCB KCMG DSO Colonel, 20th Lancers, Indian Army, General Officer Commanding-in-Chief, Eastern Command, India.

Civil Division

- Sir William Arthur Robinson KCB CBE Permanent Secretary, Ministry of Health.

==== Knight Commander of the Order of the Bath (KCB) ====
Military Division
Royal Navy

- Vice-Admiral Arthur Allan Morison Duff CB

Army

- Lieutenant-General Sir Cecil Francis Romer KBE CB CMG General Officer Commanding-in-Chief, Western Command.
- Lieutenant-General Sir Edwin Henry de Vere Atkinson KBE CB CMG CIE Master-General of Supply, Army Headquarters, India.
- Lieutenant-General The Honourable John Francis Gathorne-Hardy CB CMG DSO Half Pay List.

Civil Division

- Leopold Halliday Savile CB MICE Civil Engineer-in-chief, Admiralty.
- Lieutenant-Colonel Wilfrid Bliss Spender CBE DSO MC Head of the Civil Service, Northern Ireland.

==== Companion of the Order of the Bath (CB) ====
Military Division
Royal Navy

- Rear-Admiral the Honourable Arthur Brandreth Scott Dutton CMG
- Rear-Admiral Henry Percy Douglas CMG
- Commodore 2nd Class Geoffrey Blake DSO RN
- Engineer Rear-Admiral Henry Frank Smith DSO

Army

- Colonel (temporary Brigadier) Edward Harding-Newman CMG DSO Garrison Commander and Commandant Royal Artillery Depot, Woolwich.
- Colonel Osborne Herbert Delano-Osborne CMG Commander, 150th (York and Durham) Infantry Brigade, Territorial Army.
- Colonel Alan James Gordon Moir CBE DSO Half Pay List.
- Colonel Richard Lovell Brereton Thompson CMG DSO Half Pay List, late assistant director of Works, The War Office.
- Colonel (temporary Brigadier) Henry Karslake CMG DSO Brigadier, Royal Artillery, Western Command, India.
- Colonel (temporary Brigadier) Bertie Drew Fisher CMG DSO Aide-de-Camp to The King, Commandant, Senior Officers School, Sheerness.
- Major-General Harry Beauchamp Douglas Baird CMG CIE DSO Unemployed List, Indian Army.
- Major-General Charles John Bruce Hay CMG CBE DSO Indian Army, Commander 10th (Jubbulpore) Infantry Brigade, India.
- Colonel Norman Meredith Geoghegan DSO Indian Army, Embarkation Commandant (Assistant Quarter-Master-General), Bombay, India.
- Colonel Charles McGregor Withers, Indian Army, General Staff Officer, 1st Grade, Waziristan District, India.

Civil Division

- Frederick Gatus Bowers CBE Accountant General, Ministry of Labour.
- Eric Rücker Eddison CMG late Comptroller, Companies Department, Board of Trade.
- Sir Walter Morley Fletcher KBE FRS Secretary of Medical Research Council.
- George Francis Hill FBA Keeper of the Department of Coins and Medals, British Museum.
- Maurice Gerald Holmes OBE Principal Assistant Secretary, Board of Education.
- Lancelot Oliphant CMG Assistant Under-Secretary of State (Acting), Foreign Office.
- George Williamson Wallace Chief Commissioner of Charities for England and Wales.

=== The Most Exalted Order of the Star of India ===
==== Knight Grand Commander (GCSI) ====
- Lieutenant-Colonel the Right Honourable Sir Leslie Orme Wilson GCIE CMG DSO late Governor of Bombay.

==== Knight Commander (KCSI) ====
- Captain His Highness Rukn-ud-Daula Nusrat-i-Jang Hafiz-ul-Mulk Mukhlis-ud, Daula Nawab Sir Sadiq Muhammad Khan, Abbasi, Bahadur Nawab of Bahawalpur.

==== Companion (CSI) ====
- Lieutenant-Colonel Charles Edward Bruce CIE CBE Resident in Waziristan.
- Robert Tullis Harrison, Indian Service of Engineers, Chief Engineer and Secretary to the Government of Bombay, Public Works Department.
- Michael Keane CIE Indian Civil Service, Commissioner, Meerut Division, United Provinces.
- Clement Tudway Mullings, Indian Service of Engineers, Engineer-in-Chief, Cauvery (Metur) Project, Madras.
- James David Sifton CIE Indian Civil Service, Member of the Executive Council of the Governor of Bihar and Orissa.

=== The Most Distinguished Order of Saint Michael and Saint George ===
==== Knight Grand Cross of the Order of St Michael and St George (GCMG) ====
- The Right Honourable Sir George Russell Clerk KCMG CB His Majesty's Ambassador Extraordinary and Plenipotentiary at Constantinople.
- Brigadier-General Sir Samuel Herbert Wilson KCB KCMG KBE Permanent Under-Secretary of State for the Colonies.

==== Knight Commander of the Order of St Michael and St George (KCMG) ====
- The Honourable Frank Gavan Duffy Justice of the High Court of Australia.
- The Honourable William Nosworthy, formerly a Member of the Executive Council of the Dominion of New Zealand.
- Colonel Sir Ronald Storrs Kt CMG CBE Governor and Commander-in-Chief, Colony of Cyprus.
- Robert Hyde Greg, His Majesty's Envoy Extraordinary and Minister Plenipotentiary at Bucharest.
- Henry Fountain CMG Principal Assistant Secretary, Commercial Relations and Treaties Department, Board of Trade.
- Howard William Kennard CMG CVO His Majesty's Envoy Extraordinary and Minister Plenipotentiary at Belgrade.

==== Companion of the Order of St Michael and St George (CMG) ====
- Hugh Fraser Ayson, Resident Commissioner and Chief Judge of the High Court and of the Native Land Court, Cook Islands, Dominion of New Zealand.
- Lieutenant-Colonel Clive Latham Baillieu OBE Representative of His Majesty's Government in the Commonwealth of Australia at the Imperial Wireless and Cable Conference, 1928.
- Robert Leslie Craigie, Counsellor in the Foreign Office.
- John Howard Lidgett Cumpston Director General of Health and Director of Quarantine, Commonwealth of Australia.
- Charles William Guy Eden, lately Provincial Commissioner, Uganda Protectorate.
- John Aubrey Pearce Edgcumbe CBE Private Secretary to the Secretary of State for Dominion Affairs and for the Colonies.
- Maurice Francis Headlam CB Acting Chairman, Pacific Cable Board. Wing-Commander.
- Geoffrey George Knox, First Secretary in His Majesty's Diplomatic Service, lately Acting Counsellor at His Majesty's Embassy at Constantinople.
- Sir Norman Roderick Alexander David Leslie Bt CBE Assistant Secretary, Committee of Imperial Defence.
- John William MacDonald, Public Trustee, Dominion of New Zealand.
- Robert Menzies MacGregor, Irrigation Adviser to the Sudan Government.
- Frank Cole Madden OBE Dean of the Faculty of Medicine, Egyptian University, Cairo.
- Basil Cochrane Newton, Acting Counsellor at His Majesty's Legation at Peking.
- Arthur John Rushton O'Brien MC Surgeon Specialist and in charge of the Gold Coast Hospital, Gold Coast.
- Francis Jagoe Smith, acting Controller of Revenue, Island of Ceylon.
- Ambrose Thomas Stanton MD Chief Medical Adviser to the Secretary of State for the Colonies.
- Thomas Shenton Whitelegge Thomas OBE Colonial Secretary, Gold Coast.

Honorary Companion

- Muhammadu, Sultan of Sokoto, Nigeria.

=== Order of the Indian Empire ===
==== Knight Grand Commander (GCIE) ====
- Colonel His Highness Maharaja Sir Hari Singh, Indar Mahindar Bahadur Sipar-i-Saltanat KCIE KCVO Maharaja of Jammu and Kashmir.

==== Knight Commander (KCIE) ====
- Khan Bahadur Mian Sir Fazl-i-Hussain, Member of the Executive Council of the Governor of the Punjab.
- Sir Thomas Hudson Middleton KBE CB lately Member of the Royal Commission on Agriculture in India.
- Sir Clement Daniel Maggs Hindley VD late Chief Commissioner of Railways.

==== Companion (CIE) ====
- Lieutenant-Colonel Henry Stuart Strong, Acting Agent to the Governor-General in the States of Western India.
- Gerard Mackworth Young, Indian Civil Service, Secretary to the Government of India in the Army Department.
- Harold Anselm Bellamy Vernon, Indian Civil Service, First Member, Board of Revenue, Madras.
- Jatindra Nath Roy OBE Bengal-Civil Service, Officiating Commissioner, Rajshahi Division, Bengal.
- James Ferguson Dyer, Indian Civil Service, Officiating Commissioner, Nagpur Division, Central Provinces.
- William Mayes, Indian Forest Service, Chief Conservator of Forests, Punjab.
- Lieutenant-Colonel Charles Isherwood Brierley, Indian Medical Service, Chief Medical Officer and Inspector-General of Jails, North-West Frontier Province.
- John Mervyn Dallas Wrench, Chief Mechanical Engineer, Great Indian Peninsula Railway, Bombay.
- Robert Harvey Addington Delves, Chief Officer of the Improvement Trust Committee, Bombay.
- Nagendra Nath Gangulee, lately Member of the Royal Commission on Agriculture in India.
- Lieutenant-Colonel Walter Gordon Neale, Political Agent, Central India.
- Lieutenant-Colonel Lindsay Elliott Lumley Burne CBE Indian Army, Deputy Commissioner, Burma.
- John Rutherford Dain, Indian Civil Service, Deputy Commissioner, Singhbhum, Bihar and Orissa.
- Francis Herbert Fearnley-Whittingstall, Indian Police Service, District Superintendent of Railway Police, Rangoon.
- Lieutenant-Colonel Robert Ernest Wright, Indian Medical Service, Professor of Ophthalmology, Medical College, Superintendent, Ophthalmic Hospital, and Medical Officer, Civil Orphan Asylums, Madras.
- Lieutenant-Colonel Harold Holkar Broome, Indian Medical Service, Principal and Professor of Surgery, King Edward Medical College, Lahore.
- Eustace Edward Gunter OBE Director, Persian Gulf Telegraphs, Indo-European Telegraph Department (retired).
- Janardan Atmaram Madan, Indian Civil Service, lately Joint Secretary to the Royal Commission on Agriculture in India.
- Francis William Head Smith, lately Joint Secretary to the Royal Commission on Agriculture in India.
- Robert Steel Finlow, Indian Agricultural Service, Director of Agriculture, Bengal.
- Walter Lawrence Scott, Indian Civil Service, Director of Land Records, Assam.
- Henry Tristram Holland, Medical Missionary, Baluchistan.
- George Herbert Stoker OBE Chief Accounting Officer, Office of the High Commissioner for India.
- Dhabhai Ganeshi Lai, Lieutenant-Colonel in the Alwar State Forces and Member of Council, Alwar.

=== The Most Excellent Order of the British Empire ===
==== Dame Grand Cross of the Order of the British Empire (GBE) ====
- Edith Sophy, The Honourable Mrs Alfred Lyttelton DBE JP for public services.

==== Knight Grand Cross of the Order of the British Empire (GBE) ====
Military Division

- Air Vice-Marshal Sir Philip Woolcott Game KCB DSO Royal Air Force.

Civilian Division

- Sir Arthur Henry Crosfield Bt Chairman of the National Playing Fields Association.
- Sir William McLintock KBE CVO Senior partner in Messrs. Thomson McLintock & Co., Chartered Accountants. For public services.
- Sir William Symington McCormick FRS Chairman of the University Grants Committee and of the Advisory Council of the Department of Scientific and Industrial Research.

Diplomatic Service And Overseas List

- Sir Henry Robert Conway Dobbs KCSI KCMG KCIE High Commissioner and Commander-in-Chief, Iraq.

==== Dame Commander of the Order of the British Empire (DBE) ====
- Alida Luisa, Lady Brittain. For political and public services.
- Harriet Jane, Lady Findlay JP For political and public services in Scotland. President of the Scottish Unionist Association, 1927–28.
- Laura Knight ARA
- Professor Anne Louise McIlroy OBE Professor of Obstetrics and Gynaecology, Royal Free Hospital School of Medicine for Women, University of London. President, Maternity and Child Welfare Group of the Medical Offices of Health.
- Bertha Surtees Phillpotts OBE For services to scholarship and education.

==== Knight Commander of the Order of the British Empire (KBE) ====
Civil Division

- Sydney Armitage Armitage-Smith CB Secretary General, Reparation Commission.
- Major Arthur Joseph Atkinson MBE JP For political and public services in Kingston-upon-Hull.
- Charles Hubert Bond CBE FRCP Commissioner, Board of Control.
- Robert Tuite Boothby, Chairman of the Associated Life Offices of Scotland and of the Insurance Institute in Edinburgh. For public services.
- Dennis Henry Herbert JP MP Member of Parliament for Watford since 1918. Deputy Chairman of the Committee of Ways and Means of the House of Commons since June, 1928.
- Cyril William Hurcomb CB CBE Permanent Secretary, Ministry of Transport.
- Alfred William Hurst CB Principal Assistant Secretary, Treasury.
- Brigadier-General Harry Osborne Mance CB CMG DSO For public services.
- Lieutenant-Colonel Hugh Stephenson Turnbull JP Commissioner of Police for the City of London.
- John Thomas Pratt CMG one of His Majesty's Consuls-General in China, at present employed in the Foreign Office.

==== Commander of the Order of the British Empire (CBE) ====
Civil Division

- Louis Bernhardt George Stephen Beale, H.M. Trade Commissioner in New Zealand.
- Mary Taylor Watson Bell JP Bailie of the City of Glasgow.
- Elizabeth Cansh, Lady Cory JP For political and public services in Wales.
- Professor Winifred Clara Cullis OBE Professor of Physiology, London (Royal Free Hospital) School of Medicine for Women.
- Marta Cunningham, Founder and Honorary Organising Secretary of the Not Forgotten Association.
- Edward Joseph Duveen. For political and public services in Middlesex. Member of Hampstead Borough Council.
- Georgina Beatrice Headlam. For political and public services in Durham.
- Emily Mabel Huntington. For public and political services in Worcestershire.
- Mary Hannah Frances Ivens MS Clinical Lecturer in Obstetrics and Gynaecology, University of Liverpool.
- Beatrice Mary Marsh Monk RRC Matron, London Hospital.
- Mary Louise Oliver JP For political and public services in Leicester, President of Leicester Women's Unionist Central Council.
- Thomas Ormiston Ex-President, Cinema Exhibitors' Association.
- William Taylor Postlethwaite OBE Clerk to the Swinton and Pendlebury Urban District Council.
- The Reverend Joseph Frederick Stern, Minister Emeritus of the East London Synagogue. For social work in East London.
- George Edward Suter OBE MVO Constructive Manager, Portsmouth Dockyard.
- Mary Beatrice Treffry. For political and public services in Cornwall.
- Douglas Veale, Principal, Ministry of Health. Lately Private Secretary to the Minister.

Diplomatic Service And Overseas List

- John Barr Affleck, Acting British Consul-General, Tsinanfu.
- Robert Hewison OBE late Director of Agriculture and Forests, Sudan Government.
- Herbert Arthur Richards, late His Majesty's Consul-General at Chicago.
- Major Trenchard Craven William Fowle, First Assistant Resident, Aden.
- William Edgar Hunt, Resident, Nigeria.
- William Nowell, Director of the Amani Research Institute, Tanganyika Territory.
- Alexander Howard Ross, Provincial Commissioner, Sierra Leone.
- Li Yau-tsun, Chairman of the Chinese General Chamber of Commerce Hong Kong; for public services.

British India

- Khan Bahadur Khwaja Muhammad Nur, President, Legislative Council, Bihar and Orissa.
- Lieutenant-Colonel John Kenneth Sprot Fleming OBE Deputy Director-General, Indian Medical Service.
- Nirmul Chunder Sen OBE late Adviser, Education Department, Office of the High Commissioner for India.

Colonies, Protectorates, etc.

- John Baird Thompson, Under-Secretary, Lands and Survey Department, Dominion of New Zealand.
- Reginald Montagu Bosworth Smith, Government Secretary, Basutoland.

Honorary Commanders

- Ibrahim, Emir of Kontagora, Nigeria.

==== Officer of the Order of the British Empire (OBE) ====
Military Division

Army

- Lieutenant-Colonel Lennox Godfrey Bird DSO Commandant of the Hong Kong Volunteer Defence Corps.

Civil Division

- Charlotte Edith Ainslie until recently Headmistress of George Watson's Ladies College, Edinburgh.
- Horace Benjamin Allum MBE Controller of Supplies, Office of Works.
- George Henry Barker, Assistant Chief Constable of Sheffield.
- Lucy Barnes. For political and public services in Hertfordshire.
- Agnes Lilian Belcher, Member of the South West Lancashire War Pensions Committee.
- The Honourable Margaret Mary Best, Honorary Secretary, School Empire Tour Committee.
- Joseph James Burton JP For services as Member and Chairman of the Advisory Committee on Metalliferous Mining and Quarrying Industry.
- John Clarke JP Member of the Retail Grocers Advisory Sub-Committee, Empire Marketing Board.
- Anne Emily Cummins, Lady Almoner, St. Thomas's Hospital.
- Archie Frederick Day, Chief Accountant, Public Trustee Office.
- Walter Desborough MBE Senior Investigating Officer, Treasury.
- Malcolm Wilgress Donald, AssistantDirector, Department of Overseas Trade.
- Israel Ellis, Esq., Headmaster of Hayes Industrial School.
- John Farnsworth. For public and political services.
- John Felmingham, Governor of H.M. Prison, Birmingham.
- Benjamin John Fletcher, late. Director of Art Education for the City of Birmingham.
- Francis Howard Grose MICE Superintending Civil Engineer, Devonport Dockyard.
- John Welsh Leebody, County Surveyor, Tyrone.
- Margaret Mary Gratia Cowan-Lees JP For political and public services in the West of Scotland. Chairman of the Women's Committee of the Western Divisional Council of the Scottish Unionist Association.
- Gertrude Florence Lewis. For political and public services in Southampton.
- Edwin Lawrence Mitchell, Principal, Ministry of Agriculture and Fisheries.
- Peter Orr, Senior Principal Clerk, Ministry of Pensions.
- James Bain Paterson JP Vice-chairman, Glasgow War Pensions Committee.
- Frank Henry Putnam, Collector, Customs and Excise, Bristol.
- Edmund Cecil Ramsbottom MBE Deputy Director of Statistics, Ministry of Labour.
- Edwin Ridley Clerk to the Edmonton Board of Guardians.
- John Robert Roberts, Clerk to the City Justices, Newcastle upon Tyne.
- Henry Hugh Ryder, Principal, Customs and Excise.
- Major John Ambrose Sadd Superintendent, Defensive Munitions Department, Porton.
- Isabella Drennan Sandifer RRC late Matron, Ministry of Pensions Hospital, Castle Leazes, Newcastle upon Tyne.
- Arthur Shepherd, Headquarters Surveyor of Supplies, Navy, Army and Air Force Institutes.
- Amy Fitzgerald Simonds. For public and political services in Reading.
- Colin Smith, Deputy Clerk, Privy Council Office.
- Lieutenant-Colonel Harry James Stibbard, Commandant, Army Vocational Training Centre, Chiseldon.
- William Arthur Taylor, Superintending Examiner, Patent Office.
- Philip Augustus Theis, Assistant Secretary, Pacific Cable Board.
- Lucy Wilson Wamsley, Assistant General Inspector, Ministry of Health.
- Francis Thomas Field Watts, Senior Inspector of Taxes, Board of Inland Revenue.
- Simeon Webb JP lately Chairman of the Dudley Board of Guardians.
- John Wintringham White, Member of the Fruits Committee of the Empire Marketing Board.
- Mary Gordon Williamson For political and public services in the East of Scotland. Chairman of the Women's Committee of the Eastern Divisional Council of the Scottish Unionist Association.
- John Hubert Worthington ARIBA lately Professor of Architecture, Royal College of Art.

Diplomatic Service And Overseas List

- Albert William Burkill. For services in connection with Shanghai Defence Force (to be dated 14 December 1928).
- David Patrick Hall, Director of the Administrative Department of the Egyptian Ministry for Foreign Affairs.
- Charles Harpur. For services in connection with Shanghai Defence Force (to be dated 14 December 1928).
- Alfred Robert James Hearne. For services in connection with the protection of the Southern Section of the Tientsin-Pukow Railway (to be dated 14 December 1928).
- George Edward Hunt, Municipal Engineer, Khartoum; and Lecturer in Engineering, Gordon College.
- Lieutenant-Colonel John Bernard Keating, His Majesty's Consul at Portland, Maine.
- Percy Kent. For services in connection with Tientsin (to be dated 14 December 1928).
- Gerald Holgate Selous MBE His Majesty's Consul at Basra.
- Major David Johnston Wallace, Deputy Director-General of the Frontiers Administration, Egypt.
- Robert Arthur Williams. For services in connection with Tientsin (to be dated 14 December 1928).

Colonies, Protectorates, etc.

- Tristan Avice, Registrar General, Mauritius.
- John Joseph Camacho; formerly Member of the Executive Council of the Leeward Islands; for public and charitable services.
- Frank Cundall, Secretary and Librarian of the Jamaica Institute, Jamaica.
- Norman Parsons Jewell MC Resident Surgical Officer, European Hospital, Nairobi, Kenya.
- John Crichton Stuart McDouall LRCP Director of Medical and Sanitary Services, Sierra Leone.
- Enrique Prada, Clerk to the City Council of Port-of-Spain, Trinidad; for public services.
- John Frederick Rowlands, deputy director of Public Works, Palestine.
- Homfray Welby Solomon, Unofficial Member of the Executive Council, St. Helena.
- Hugh John Harry Stedman MICE Director of Public Works, Zanzibar.
- Arnold Alfred Price Dunbar Stone AMICE Director of Public Works, Cyprus.
- Robert Simon Mansfield Sturgjes, Political Secretary to the High Commissioner for Iraq.
- Cecil Henry Wade, Assistant Chief Secretary to the Government, Nyasaland Protectorate.
- James Walker, Chief Veterinary Research Officer, Kenya.
- Walter MacLellan Wilson, formerly Unofficial Member of the Executive and Legislative Councils, Kenya.

British India

- Amar Singh, Rao Raja, Lieutenant-Colonel in the Alwar State Forces and Member of Council, Alwar.
- Captain Bernard Anson Westbrook, Chief Officer, Calcutta Fire Brigade, Bengal.
- Reginald Tharle-Hughes MBE Establishment Officer, Army Department, Government of India.

==== Member of the Order of the British Empire (MBE) ====
Civil Division

- Frederick William Abbott MVO Superintendent, Metropolitan Police.
- Paul Archer, Principal Clerk, Manchester Branch, Public Trustee Office.
- Richard Henry Bennett, Deputy Naval Store Officer, Admiralty.
- Richard Bowen, Superintendent, Swansea Borough Police.
- James Charles Brampton, Ministry of Pensions representative in Canada.
- William Brown, Sub-Inspector of Mines, Mines Department.
- Herbert William Bryan, Staff Clerk, Royal Hospital, Chelsea.
- Henry Westlake Bryant, Superintendent Relieving Officer in Lambeth.
- Mary Elizabeth Burke, First Glass Clerk, Companies (Winding-Up) Department, Board of Trade.
- Ernest Call, Director of Public Cleansing, Hammerton Street Depot, Bradford.
- Alice Gertrude Caton, Head Mistress, Brassey Street Central Council School, Birkenhead.
- Ethel Mary Cauty, Matron, Liverpool Maternity Hospital.
- Robert William Cave, Official Receiver in Bankruptcy (Brighton), Board of Trade.
- Edith Ann Charlesworth, Higher Clerical Officer, Ministry of Health.
- Emily Cheesman. For political and public services, Member of Tunbridge. Wells Borough Council.
- Charles. Clarke, Senior Staff Officer, Customs and Excise.
- Ellen Amelia Cleary, Matron, Norwich City Mental Hospital.
- James Edward Collins, Civil Assistant to the Director, Mobilization. Department, Admiralty.
- Edward Cordes, Higher Grade Clerk, Home Office.
- Thomas Cringle, Superintendent and Deputy Chief Constable, Isle of Man Constabulary.
- Reginald John Turner Deer, Staff Officer, Board of Inland Revenue.
- Edwin John Denney, Senior Executive Officer, Customs and Excise.
- Henry Liptrott Findley. Accountant, Office of Works.
- Thomas Forth, Waterguard Superintendent, First Class, Customs and Excise.
- Robert Green, Civil Assistant, Military College of Science, Woolwich.
- Albert George Heath, Staff Surveyor, Land Registry.
- Francis Joseph Stacey-Henley, Commandant, Metropolitan Special Constabulary.
- Helen Sarah Copper Hodgson, County Superintendent Health Visitor, Durham.
- George Edward Holden FIC Technical Adviser, to the Dyestuffs Advisory Licensing, Committee.
- Thomas Ernest Jackson, Commandant, Metropolitan Special Constabulary.
- Dorothy Jeffery, Chief Superintendent Typists Home Office.
- Percy William Jupp Supervising. Estate Surveyor, Office of Works.
- George Gregory Lewis, chairman, London School Journeys Association. Head Master of Ellerslie Road Council School, Hammersmith.
- Lewis Edward Lianming, Warship Production Superintendent (Southern District) Naval Construction Department, Admiralty.
- Councillor Gladys Muriel Mason, Member of the Lewisham and Deptford War Pensions Committee.
- Allan Mentz, Valuation Clerk, Higher Grade, Board of Inland Revenue.
- Robert Oliver Morris, Staff Officer, Ministry of Health.
- Peter Morton, Superintendent and Deputy Chief Constable, Fifeshire.
- Joseph Arnold Musto, Superintendent in charge of Buildings and Supplies, Board of Inland Revenue.
- Frederick John Ogden, Senior Staff Officer, Ministry of Health.
- Maud Haddrell Venton Oldridge, Chief Superintendent of Typists, Treasury.
- Frederick William Preston, Chief Area Officer, Eastern Area, Ministry of Pensions.
- Charles Pennycock Robertson, Head of Press Section, Air Ministry.
- Samuel Shepherd, Relieving Officer, Chester-le-Street Union.
- Sidney John Muir-Smith, Principal Clerk, Ministry of Pensions.
- Edward Walter John Stephens, Grade III Clerk, War Office.
- Alfred Stewart, Superintendent, Somerset Constabulary.
- Sidney Charles Taunton, Commander, Birmingham Special Constabulary Reserve.
- Annie Oilman Thomas, lately Confidential Clerk, Treasury.
- Ruth Tomlinson, Secretary, Incorporated Federated Association of Boot and Shoe Manufacturers.
- The Reverend Canon Charles Frederick Tonks, Secretary of the Kent County Police Court Mission.
- Guy Venning, Staff Officer, Colonial Office.
- Margaret McPherson White, Superintendent for Scotland, Queen's Institute of District Nursing.

Diplomatic Service And Overseas List

- Dorothy Marion Boaler. For services in connection with troops at Tientsin (to be dated 14 December 1928).
- Hilda Wycliffe Byrne, Chairman of British Women's Association, Shanghai (to be dated 14 December 1928).
- Anthony Joseph Amy John Cachia, Honorary Secretary of the General Council of the Maltese Community in Cairo.
- Samuel Alexander Erskine, Acting British Vice Consul at Port Said.
- John Archibald Bristow Jones, Assistant Electrical Engineer, Sudan Government Railways and Steamers.
- William Kinmonth, Superintendent of Police, Khartoum Province.
- Florence O'Neill. For services in connection with troops at Tientsin (to be dated 14 December 1928).
- George Alfred Payne, British Vice-Consul, Port-au-Prince.
- Georges Tchamitch, Assistant Clerk to His Majesty's Embassy, Constantinople.
- Charles Wodehouse Williams, Gordon College, Khartoum.
- Robert Wintle, Chief Clerk, Khartoum Province.

British India

Colonies, Protectorates, etc.

- John Buckman, Member of the Board of Agriculture, Gold Coast; for services in the promotion of agriculture.
- Nora Marie Cremen, Nursing Sister, Medical Department, Nyasaland Protectorate.
- Isabella Hardie Curr LRCP in charge of the McLeod Hospital for Women at Inuvil, near Jaffna, Island of Ceylon.
- Major Edward John Briffa de Piro, Private Secretary to the Head of the Ministry, Malta.
- Arthur John Ward Hornby, Agricultural Chemist, Nyasaland Protectorate.
- Frances Janet Jayasekera;, Probation Officer and a Member of the Board of Prison Visitors, Island of Ceylon.
- Carrie Green Lumbley. For educational services in Nigeria.
- James Dalton Milner AMICE Assistant Director of Public Works, Nyasaland Protectorate.
- Stephen Samuel Murray, Senior Assistant-Secretary, Secretariat, Nyasaland Protectorate.
- The Reverend James Richard Nichols Inspector of Schools, Barbados.
- Grace Orr. For charitable and public services in Kenya.
- Elwood D'Arcy Tibbits, Assistant Colonial Secretary, Leeward Islands.
- John Hammond Williams AMICE Chief Computer and Examiner of Diagrams, Lands Survey Division, Department of Lands, Kenya.
- The Reverend Canon William Joseph Wright of All Saints Cathedral, Nairobi, Kenya; for charitable services.

Honorary Members

- Abdul Rahman Emin Gorayib, Director of Public Works, Trans-Jordan.

=== Order of the Companions of Honour ===
- Florence Elizabeth, Lady Barrett CBE MS Dean of the London School of Medicine for Women, President, Medical Women's International Association.
- Lilian Mary Baylis, Lessee and Manager, Old Vic Theatre.
- The Reverend John Charles Carlile CBE Editor of the Baptist Times. For public and social services.
- Frederick Delius, Composer.

=== Kaisar-i-Hind Medal ===
First Class

- Maud Lilian Davys OBE Assistant in the Military Food Laboratory, Kasauli.
- The Reverend Mother Mary Aloysia; Superior-General of the Apostolic Carmel, Mangalore, South Kanara District, Madras.
- Pearl Smith Chute, Lady Doctor in charge of the Canadian Baptist Mission Hospital, Akidu, West Godavari District, Madras.
- The Reverend John Watt, late Principal Scottish Churches College, Calcutta, Bengal.
- The Reverend William Charles Bertrand Purser, late Missionary, St. Michael's Normal School, Kemmendine, Burma.
- The Reverend Ernest Bell Sharpe, Missionary, Superintendent, Purulia Leper Asylum, Bihar and Orissa.
- Nowroji Jamshedji Bandorawala, Principal Medical Officer, Bikaner State.
- John Hutchison LRCP Church of Scotland Mission, Ohamba State, Punjab.

=== Air Force Cross ===
- Squadron Leader Edward James Poynter Burling DSC DFC
- Squadron Leader Gerald Edward Livock DFC
- Flight Lieutenant Sydney Leo Gregory Pope DFC
- Flight Lieutenant Clifford Westly Busk MC
- Flying Officer Edward Hedley Fielden.

=== Air Force Medal ===
- Flight Sergeant Herbert John Coppin.
- Corporal Thomas William Penny Jeffrey.

=== King's Police Medal (KPM) ===
England and Wales

- George Thomas Guest, Chief Constable of Denbighshire.
- William Varney Webb, Chief Constable of Cambridgeshire.
- John Maxwell, Chief Constable, Manchester City Police.
- Cecil Charles Hudson Moriarty OBE Assistant Chief Constable, Birmingham City Police.
- Albert Edward Davis, Superintendent, Metropolitan Police.
- William Evan Williams, Superintendent and Deputy Chief Constable, Breconshire Constabulary.
- Frederick Robert Hutchings, Superintendent and Chief Clerk, Devon Constabulary.
- George Wilson, Superintendent, Huntingdonshire Constabulary.
- William Robert Lucas, Superintendent, Surrey Constabulary.
- James Fairbairn, Superintendent, West Riding of Yorkshire Constabulary.
- William Walter Harrison MBE Deputy Chief Constable, Cardiff City Police.
- George Brown Angus, Superintendent, Liverpool City Police.
- William Guthrie Mattinson, Detective Sergeant, Liverpool City Police.
- Thomas Farrance, Constable, Metropolitan Police.
- Cecil Newing, Constable, Metropolitan Police.
- Henry George Sparks, Constable, Metropolitan Police.
- Hugh Evans, Constable, Caernarvonshire-Constabulary.
- Edward Richards, Constable, Lancashire Constabulary.
- William Thomas Herrett, Constable, Surrey Constabulary.
- Charles Brown, Detective Constable, Newcastle upon Tyne City Police.
- Arthur William Marlow, Constable, Newcastle upon Tyne City Police.
- George Joseph Murrell, Senior Superintendent, London Fire Brigade.
- Joseph Entwisle, Second Officer, Farnworth Urban District Fire Brigade.

Scotland

- Robert Thomson Birnie OBE Chief Constable of Angus.
- William McDonald, Chief Constable, Coatbridge Burgh Police.
- James Snowie MBE Superintendent and Deputy Chief Constable, East Lothian Constabulary.
- James Muir, Superintendent, Glasgow City Police.
- David Clow, Constable, Dundee City Police.

Northern Ireland

- James Wilkin, Head Constable, Royal Ulster Constabulary.
- Patrick Tuohy, Head Constable, Royal Ulster Constabulary.

Australia

- Thomas Harold James Duckworth, Constable, Queensland Police Force.

Union of South Africa

- William Henry Quirk, Senior Inspector, South African Police.

British India

- Charles Banks Cunningham, Officiating Commissioner of Police, Madras.
- Devanakonda Abbas Ali Beg Kamal Beg, Probationary Head Constable, Madras Police.
- Khan Bahadur Saiyid Mahmud Shah, Superintendent, Bombay Police.
- Khan Bahadur Shapurji Dinshaw Variawa, Deputy Superintendent, Bombay Police.
- Shew Pujan Pandey, Constable, Calcutta Police.
- Chait Ram Singh, Sub-Inspector, United Provinces Police.
- Ram Sarup Singh, Head Constable, United Provinces Police.
- Abdul Rahim Khan, Head Constable United Provinces Police.
- Dal Bahadur Singh, Constable., United Provinces Police.
- Edward Alfred Hopkins, Assistant Superintendent, Punjab Police.
- Khan Sahib Chaudhri Abdul Haq, Deputy Superintendent, Punjab Police.
- Jamal-ud-Din, Officiating Sub-Inspector, Punjab Police.
- Budho Khan, Head Constable, Punjab Police.
- Ghulam Hassan, Foot Constable, Punjab Police.
- Captain Glyn Frank Jones, Assistant Commandant, Burma Military Police.
- U On Gyaw Superintendent, Burma Police.
- Maurice Osborne Tanner, Superintendent, Burma Police.
- Dhanpati Upadhyaya, Probationary Inspector, Bihar, and Orissa Police.
- Sheo Bihari Kuar, Constable, Bihar and Orissa Police.
- Syed Sadiq Husein, Sub-Inspector, Central Provinces Police.
- Channan Shah, Constable, North-West Frontier Province Police.
- Sher Zaman, Constable, North-West Frontier Province Police.
- Sher Muhammad, Constable, North-West Frontier Province Police.
- William Outersori Wood, Assistant Superintendent, North-West Frontier Province Police.
- Wasifulla, Head Constable North-West Frontier Province Police.
- Muhammad Ibrahim, Head Constable, North-West Frontier Province Police.
- Thakur Bakhtawar Singh, Superintendent of Police, Jodhpur. State.

His Majesty has also graciously consented to the King's Police Medal being handed to the next-of-kin, of the undermentioned officer, who was killed on duty on the 4th April, 1928, and would have received the decoration had he survived:

- Kishan Lai, Constable, United Provinces Police.

Colonies, Protectorates and Mandated Territories

- Frederick Hubert Erskine McDonald, Assistant Superintendent, British Honduras Police Force and Superintendent of Fire Brigade.
- Captain Harry Patrick Rice, Superintendent, Kenya Police.
- Bernard Scott, Inspector of Police, Straits Settlements.
- Ernest Edgar Turner, Chief of Police and Superintendent of Prisons, Grenada.
- Captain Andrew Gore Uniacke DSO Inspector-General of Police and Director of Prisons, Northern Provinces, Nigeria.
- Captain Percy Redesdale Wardroper MBE Commissioner of Police, Northern Rhodesia.

=== British Empire Medal (BEM) ===
Military Division
For Meritorious Service

- Bash-Shawish (Company Sergeant-Major), Hassan Mohammed, Eastern Arab Corps, Sudan Defence Force.
- Bash-Shawish (Company Sergeant-Major), Mohammed Medani, Western Arab Corps, Sudan Defence Force.

Civil Division
For Meritorious Service

- Henry Potten, late Office Keeper, Home Office.
- Ellenora James, Superintendent, Aylesbury Borstal Institution and Convict Prison.
- Charles Arthur Lingley, Chief Officer, 1st Class, Liverpool Prison.
- Frank Richardson, Chief Officer, 1st Class, Durham Prison.
- James Griffiths, Chief Inspector, Chester City Police.
- George William Smale, Assistant Commander, Metropolitan Special Constabulary.
- Thomas Simcox, Lieutenant, Glasgow City Police.
- Arthur Woodley, Courier, H.M. Legation, Durazzo.
- Ato Mohamed Eghi, Interpreter Servant, British Legation, Addis Ababa.
- Kalam Sakit, Sergeant, Upper Nile Province Police.
- Almas Zimia, Policeman, Upper Nile Province Police.
- Mohammed Awwad. Steamers Reis, Sudan Government Railways and Steamers.
- Ali Mohammed Sherif, Dispenser, Sudan Medical Service.
- Mohammed El Bashir, Bash-Shawish (Company Sergeant-Major), Sudan Veterinary Police.
- Hussein Sirour, Chargeman, Sudan Government Railways and Steamers.
- Saleh bin Ali el-Sheibani, Interpreter Grade I, British Residency, Zanzibar.
- Gamillala Ahmed, Sha-wish (Sergeant), Upper Nile Province Police.

=== Royal Red Cross (RRC) ===
First Class

- Superintending Sister Evelyn Muriel Keays.
- Wilhelmine Walker, Chief Principal Matron, Queen Alexandra's Imperial Military Nursing Service, in recognition of her long and devoted service in Military Hospitals in India.
- Marion Welch, Matron, Princess Mary's Royal Air Force Nursing Service, in recognition of the exceptional devotion and competency displayed by her in the nursing and care of the sick in Air Force Hospitals at Home and in Iraq.

Second Class

- Superintending Sister Nita Courtice.
- Superintending Sister Marguerite May Abraham.
- Superintending Sister Ann Eliza Hartley-Jones.
- Superintending Sister Dora Cameron Shewell.
