= 1921 Birthday Honours =

British government recognitions

The 1921 Birthday Honours were appointments by King George V to various orders and honours to reward and highlight good works by citizens of the British Empire. The appointments were made to celebrate the official birthday of the King, and were published on 3 and 4 June 1921.

The recipients of honours are displayed here as they were styled before their new honour, and arranged by honour, with classes (Knight, Knight Grand Cross, etc.) and then divisions (Military, Civil, etc.) as appropriate.

== United Kingdom and British Empire ==
=== Marquess ===
- The Rt. Hon. Sir George Nathaniel, Earl Curzon of Kedleston KG GCSI GCIE

=== Viscount ===
- The Rt. Hon. Sir Frederick Edwin, Baron Birkenhead

=== Baron ===
- The Rt. Hon. Sir James Henry Dalziel Bt by the name, style and title of Baron Dalziel of Kirkcaldy, of Marylebone in the county of London.
- The Rt. Hon. Sir Ailwyn Edward Fellowes KCVO KBE JP DL by the name, style and title of Baron Ailwyn, of Honingham, in the County of Norfolk. Member of Parliament for Hants (Ramsey), 1887–1908; Junior Lord of the Treasury, 1900-1905. Chairman of Norfolk County Council. Chairman of Agricultural Wages Board;
- Sir Marcus Samuel by the name, style and title of Baron Bearsted, of Maidstone, in the County of Kent. For eminent public and national services. A generous benefactor to charitable and scientific objects.

=== Privy Councillor ===
The King appointed the following to His Majesty's Most Honourable Privy Council of the United Kingdom:

- Sir Edwin Andrew Cornwall Bt DL JP MP Member of Parliament for N.E. Bethnal Green since 1906. Chairman of National Insurance Joint Commission, and Insurance Minister in the House of Commons, December, 1916, to February, 1919

The King appointed the following to His Majesty's Most Honourable Privy Council of Ireland:

- The Hon. William Moore KC One of the Judges of the King's Bench. Division of the High Court of Justice in Ireland
- Sir Geoffrey Henry Browne, Baron Oranmore and Brownie KP Member of Irish Convention
- George Francis Stewart JP DL Represented Southern Unionists on the Irish Convention, where he took a leading part in the effort to effect a settlement. He was Chairman of the Surveyors Institute in Great Britain, and also of the Land Agents Association. Has been Governor of the Bank of Ireland for two years, Deputy Lieutenant for the County of Dublin

=== Baronetcies ===
- Douglas Alexander, President of the Singer Manufacturing Company. Has performed important work in the development of welfare schemes for industrial workers. For public and national services.
- The Hon. William Gervase Beckett MP Member of Parliament for Whitby since 1906
- William Swart Berry, Editor-in-Chief, Sunday Times
- Charles Alexander Cain JP For public services. Has devoted large sums of money to hospital work in addition to other charities. Trustee and Governor of Blue Coat Hospital, Liverpool; the Royal Southern Hospital, Liverpool; and Chairman of Samaritan Hospital.
- Thomas Sivewright Catto, for public services, particularly in connection with the transport of food and munitions from the United States to Great Britain and allied countries.
- Sir William Dingwall Mitchell Cotts KBE in recognition of services rendered, to the Union of South Africa
- John Bryn Edwards, for social and philanthropic work in East Glamorgan
- Capt. Sir John Malcolm Fraser RNVR For public services. Rendered valuable assistance in the Queen's Devonshire House Fund and in the Royal Naval Air Service during the war.
- Joseph William Isherwood, Inventor of Isherwood System of Longitudinal Construction of Ships. Member of Institute of Naval Architects. For public services.
- Pierce Lacy, Founder and Chairman of Advisory Committee of British Shareholders Trust, Limited, which Company has financed many of the most important Industrial Companies in England.
- William Arthur Mount CBE MP Member of Parliament for Newbury Division of Berkshire, 1900 to 1906, and since 1910
- Sir Percy Wilson Newson, President of Bank of Bengal, 1920. Governor of Imperial Bank of India, 1921. For public services.
- William Joseph Noble JP President of Chamber of Shipping, 1920, and of the Baltic and White Sea Conference, 1913-21. For services rendered to the Ministry of Shipping.
- George Renwick MP Member of Parliament for Newcastle upon Tyne, 1900–1906, 1908–10, and since 1918.
- Sir Arthur Munro Sutherland KBE Chairman of the Sutherland and a number of other Steamship Companies. Director of the Blyth Shipbuilding Company, and Mercantile Dry Docks. Sheriff of Newcastle, 1917; Lord Mayor of Newcastle during 1919. For public and national services.
- Sir Charles Sykes KBE MP Member of Parliament for Huddersfield since 1918; director of Wool Textile Production and Chairman of the Board of Control of the Worsted Woollen Trades.
- Edmund Hoyle Vestey, for public services. Rendered great assistance in feeding the troops during the war.

=== Knight Bachelor ===
- Wilfred Atlay, Chairman, Stock Exchange, London
- Jeffrey Browning CBE ISO Chief-Inspector Board of Customs and Excise
- William Henry Butlin, Ex Vice-Consul for Spain. For public services.
- James Charles Calder CBE Ex-director of timber control. For public and national services.
- Robert Clough MP Member of Parliament for Keighley Division of Yorkshire. Mayor of Keighley 1907-1908
- Thomas Henry Fleming, Mayor of Harrogate 1915–16, 1916–17, 1918-19. Rendered conspicuous services during the war in the-promotion of every local effort, giving his whole time to national work
- Thomas Mansel Franklen, Clerk of the Peace for Glamorgan for 40 years. Clerk to the Glamorgan County Council since its formation in 1888. For public services.
- Francis Gore-Browne KC JP Chairman of Rates Advisory Committee. Chairman Civil Service Arbitration Board, 1918–20
- His Honour Judge Thomas Colpitts Granger JP Senior County Court Judge
- John Roger Burrow Gregory, Senior partner in the firm of Rawle, Johnstone & Co., Treasurer of the Foundling Hospital. Past Master of the Grocers Company; Member of the Council of The Law Society. Has given very great assistance to successive holders of the office of Lord Chancellor
- Colonel James William Greig CB KC VD MP Member of Parliament for West Renfrewshire since January, 1910
- Alderman Lieutenant-Colonel Harry George Handover JP Mayor of Paddington for eight years
- John Henry Harrowing, for public services. Twenty-eight years County Councillor of the North Riding County Council and afterwards elected County Alderman.
- William Henderson CB Town Councillor Dundee, 1896-1904. Chairman of Technical College. Chairman of YMCA and of City of Dundee Territorial Association. 1907-1919. For public and local services.
- Francis Hugh George Hercy CBE DL For valuable voluntary services rendered for five years to the Ministry of National Service and War Office.
- John Scott Hindley, Commercial Adviser to the Coal Mines Dept. since 1918
- Henry Hollingdrake JP for public and local services.
- Charles John Holmes Director National Gallery
- Councillor Sidney Richard White Humphries, for public services. Councillor of Bristol for many years. President of Bristol Chamber of Commerce
- Samuel Instone, Founder of Askern Garden City. For public services.
- Arthur Keith FRCS FRS Hunterian Professor and Conservator of the Royal College of Surgeons
- Duncan Mackenzie Kerly KC Member of the Commission on Income Tax and Chairman of the Board of Referees for Excess Profits Duty
- Leonard William Kershaw, King's Coroner, Master of the Crown Office and Registrar of the Court of Criminal Appeal
- William Lane-Mitchell MP for Streatham since 1918. Twice Mayor of Camberwell
- Alfred Edward Lewis, Managing Director of the National Provincial and Union Bank of England, Ltd
- Thomas Lewis CBE FRCP FRS Honorary consulting physician to the Ministry of Pensions since April, 1919
- Dyson Mallinson. For public services. Has rendered valuable services in connection with various colleges and institutions
- Brigadier-General Charles Philip Martel CB Chief Superintendent of Ordnance Factories, Woolwich
- Richard Martin DL Ex-Mayor of Swansea
- George Mellor DL For public and national services, particularly in connection with the King's Lancashire Military Convalescent Hospital
- Adrian Donald Wilde Pollock, City Chamberlain and Treasurer since 1912
- Walter Renton Preston, Member of Parliament for Stepney (Mile End Division)
- William Henry Purchase, For valuable services rendered since the armistice to the Appointments Department of the Ministry of Labour
- Professor John Rankine KC DL Professor of Scots Law, University of Edinburgh
- Francis Jubal Reynolds DL For public services.
- Edward Rhodes, Chairman of Lancashire and Cheshire Coalition Liberal Committee
- Fredierick Gill Rice Past President of London Master Builders Association and of the Institute of Public Builders. For public services.
- Colonel Philip Wigham Richardson OBE VD. For services rendered throughout the Empire for 40 years in connection with rifle shooting
- Alderman, Alfred Read Sargeant DL Mayor of Hove throughout the war
- Henry White Smith OBE Chairman of Bristol Aircraft Factory. For services to Civil Aviation
- William Henry Thomas MBE Member of City of London Corporation. Deputy of the Ward of Cheap.
- John Turner DL Ex High Sheriff of Leicestershire. For public services.
- Francis Minchin Voules CBE Knight of Grace of the Order of St. John of Jerusalem. For services rendered to British Prisoners of War.
- Robert Woolley Walden, For public services. Member of the Metropolitan Asylums Board for 20 years and its Chairman for the past six years; 21 years Guardian of the Poor; 20 years a Member of the Council and Alderman of the City of Westminster, and Mayor, 1908-1909
- Sydney Russell-Wells MRCP MRCS Vice Chancellor, University of London. Representative of the University of London on the General Medical Council. For public services.
- Howell James Williams DL JP Deputy Chairman, London County Council
- Robert Wilson, Provost of Pollokshaws
- Alfred Woodgarbe OBE Proprietor-General of Establishments in the Ministry of Health since its formation
- Bernard Swanwick Wright, Alderman of City of Nottingham. For public services.

Ireland

- George Beresford Butler, Senior Resident Magistrate in Ireland. Was appointed in 1889, and is still serving
- Frederick Conway Dwyer Ex-President, College of Surgeons in Ireland. Lieutenant-Col (temporary), Royal Army Medical Corps, and Operating Surgeon to King George V. Military Hospital in Dublin. Honorary Surgeon to Lord Lieutenant of Ireland. Chairman of House of Industry Hospitals. H.M. Inspector of Anatomy in Ireland.
- James Campbell Percy DL DL Honorary Lieutenant, Royal Navy, during war. Proprietor of Motor News, Irish Builder, Irish Cyclist and Motor Cyclist. Chairman of Sackville Pines
- Henry James Forde DL For services in connection with the Grain Trade in Ireland and as member of Royal Commission on Wheat Supplies

British India

- Justice Theagaraja Ayyar Sadasiva Ayyar, Diwam Bahadur, Puisne Judge of the High Court, Madras
- Justice William Teunon, Indian Civil Service, Puisne Judge of the High Court, Calcutta, Bengal
- Justice William Tudball, Indian Civil Service, Puisne Judge of the High Court, Allahabad, United Provinces
- Khan Bahadur Muhammad Israr Hasan Khan CIE Judicial Minister, Bhopal State, Central India
- Alfred Domald Pickford, Senior Partner, Messrs. Begg, Dunlop & Co., Calcutta, Bengal
- Edgar Joseph Holberton CBE Manager, Bombay-Burma Trading Corporation, and lately President of the Chamber of Commerce, Burma
- Jehangir Hormasji Kothari OBE Landlord, Sind, Bombay
- Raj Bahadur Seth Bishesihar Das, Banker, Nagpur, Central Provinces

Colonies, Protectorates, etc.

- Lieutenant-Colonel Wyndham Henry Deedes CMG DSO Civil Secretary to the Administration, Palestine
- Hugh Dixson, in recognition of services rendered to the Commonwealth of I Australia
- Benjamin John Fuller, of Sydney, New South Wales, in recognition of services rendered to educational and charitable causes
- John Burchmore Harrison CMG Director and Government Analyst, Department of Science and Agriculture, Colony of British Guiana
- Sidney Kidman, in recognition of services rendered to the Commonwealth of Australia
- John Pearce Luke CMG member of the House of Representatives of the Dominion of New Zealand, Mayor of the City of Wellington, for the past eight years
- Brigadier-General Donald Johnstone McGavin CMG DSO Director-General of Medical Services in New Zealand
- Ponnambalam Ramanathan KC CMG nominated unofficial member of the Legislative Council of the Island of Ceylon
- Lewis Richardson CBE in recognition of services rendered to the Union of South Africa
- Walter Sydney Shaw, the Chief Justice of the Straits Settlements

=== The Most Honourable Order of the Bath ===
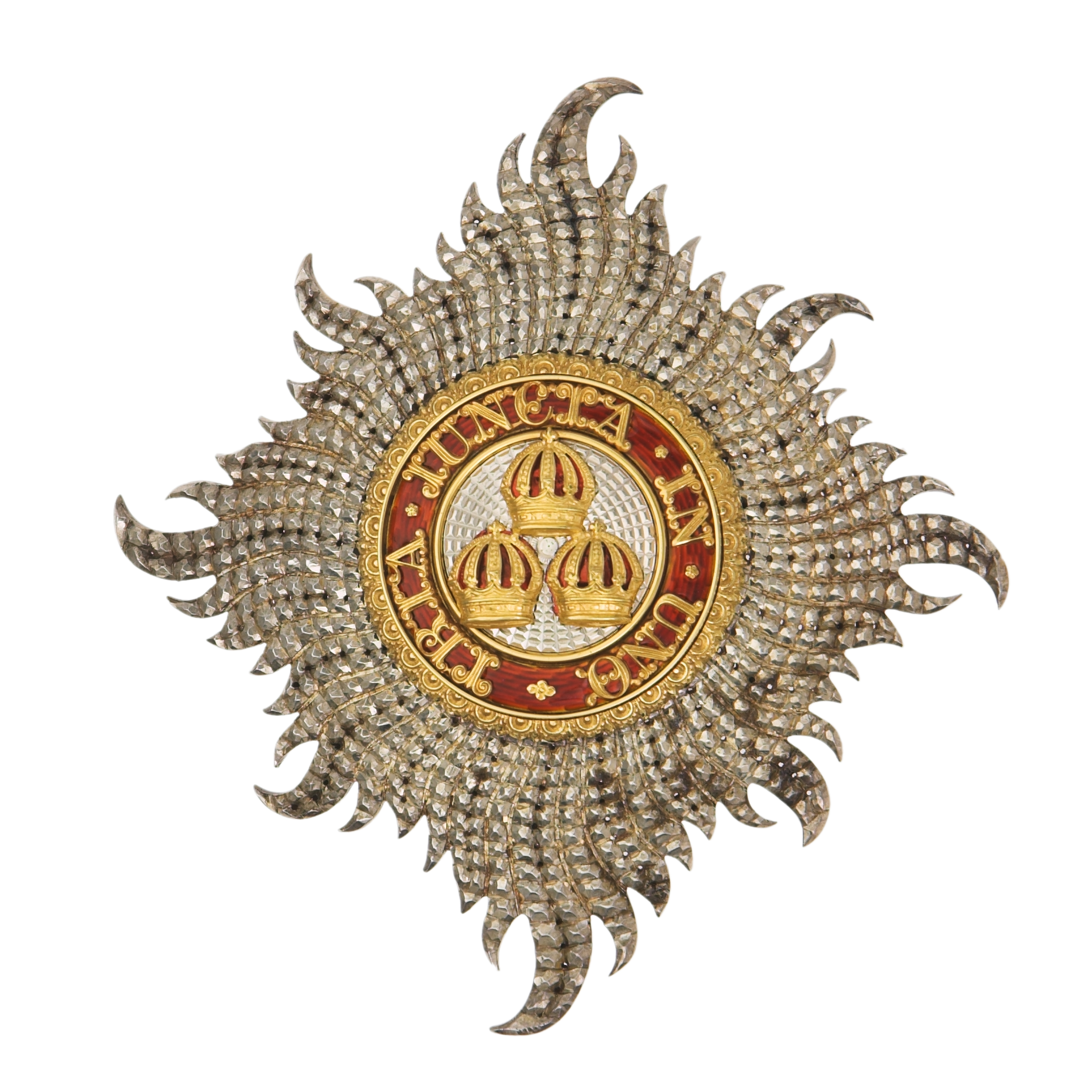
Civilian star of the Knight Grand Cross of the Order of the Bath

==== Knight Grand Cross of the Order of the Bath (GCB) ====
===== Military Division =====
Army

- General Sir James Willcocks GCMG KCB KCSI DSO Colonel of the Loyal Regiment (North Lancashire)
- General Sir Herbert Vaughan Cox KCB KCMG CSI Retired Pay, Indian Army

==== Knight Commander of the Order of the Bath (KCB) ====
===== Military Division =====
Royal Navy

- Admiral Sir Frederick Charles Tudor-Tudor KCMG CB
- Major-General Charles Newsham Trotman CB

Army

- Lieutenant-General The Hon. Sir Frederick William Stopford KCMG KCVO CB
- Lieutenant-General Sir Alfred Edward Codrington KCVO CB (Colonel, Coldstream Guards),
- Major General William Douglas Smith CB
- Major-General Christopher Rice Havard Nicholl (Colonel Commandant, Rifle Brigade),
- Major-General Philip Mainwaring Carnegy CB Retired Pay, Indian Army

===== Civil Division =====
- Surgeon Rear-Admiral Percy William Biassett-Smith CB CMG
- Colonel Thomas Walter, Viscount Hampden CB CMG ADC
- Colonel Edward Nathan Whitley CB CMG DSO
- Francis Lewis Castle Floud CB Permanent Secretary to the Ministry of Agriculture

==== Companion of the Order of the Bath (CB) ====
===== Military Division =====
Royal Navy

- Rear-Admiral Philip Howard Colomb

Army

- Major-General The Hon. Sir Charles John Sackville-West KBE CMG Military Attaché
- Colonel Guy William Fitton CMG Chief Paymaster, Royal Army Pay Corps
- Colonel Francis Lyon CMG DSO Military Attaché
- Colonel Gilbert Harwood Harrison CMG Chief Engineer, Eastern Command
- Colonel Julius Ralph Young, Chief Engineer, Forces in China
- Colonel William Dunlop Smith CMG DSO Deputy Director of Veterinary Services, Eastern Command
- Colonel Charles Edward Pollock CBE DSO Assistant Director of Medical Services, Eastern Command
- Colonel William Maunder Withycombe CMG DSO Brigade Commander, 3rd West Riding Infantry Brigade
- Colonel Cosmo Gordon Stewart CMG DSO Commander, Allahabad Brigade Area
- Colonel Cyril Norman Macmullen CMG CIE Indian Army, Brigade Commander, 17th Indian Infantry Brigade
- Colonel John Francis Stanhope Duke-Coleridge CMG DSO Indian Army, General Staff Officer, 1st Grade, Headquarters, Indian Army

===== Civil Division =====
- Colonel Henry Clayton Darlington CMG TD
- William Charles Fletcher, Chief Inspector of Secondary Education under the Board of Education
- Llewelyn Southworth Lloyd, Assistant Secretary to the Department of Scientific and Industrial Research since its formation
- Lieutenant-Colonel Ronald Dockray Waterhouse CMG Private Secretary to Bonar Law

=== The Most Exalted Order of the Star of India ===
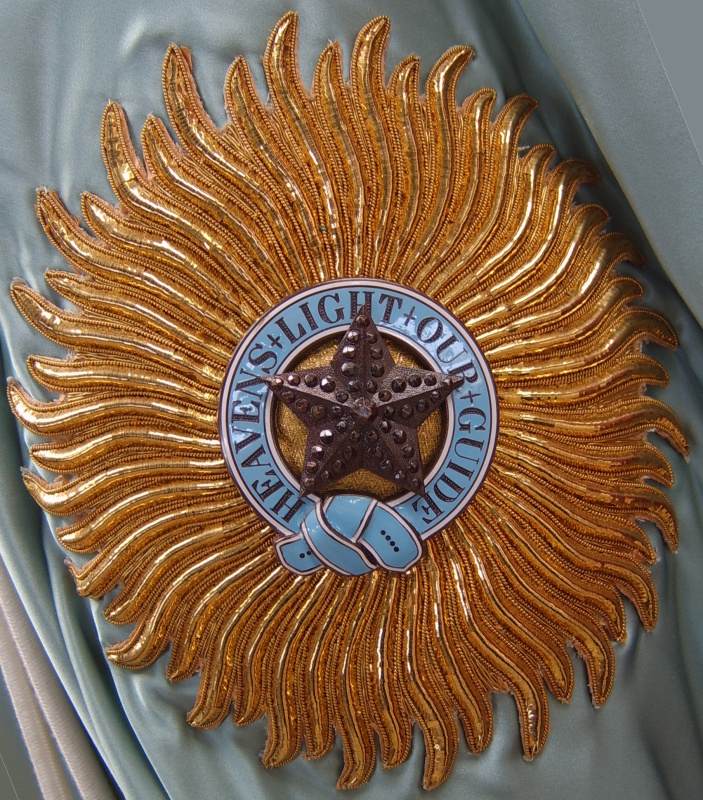
Star of a Knight Grand Commander of the Most Exalted Order of the Star of India

==== Knight Grand Commander (GCSI) ====
- Colonel His Highness Alhijah Farzand-i-Dilpazir-i-Daulat-i-Inglisihia, Mukhlis-ud-Daula Nasir-ul-Mulk Amir-ul-Umra Nawab Sir Hamid Ali Khan Bahadur, Mustaid Jung GCIE GCVO Nawab of Rampur, Honorary Aide-de-Camp to His Majesty the King-Emperor

==== Knight Commander (KCSI) ====
- Charles George Todhunter CSI Indian Civil Service, Member of the Executive Council, Madras
- Sir Henry Wheeler KCIE CSI Indian Civil Service, Member of the Executive Council, Bengal

==== Companion (CSI) ====
- Raja Sir Muhammad Ali Muhammad Khan, Khan Bahadur KCIE Raja of Mahmudabad, Home Member, United Provinces Government
- Robert Erskine Holland Political Department, Government of India, Agent to the Governor General in Rajputana and Chief Commissioner of Ajmer-Merwara
- Lieutenant-Colonel Francis Granville Seville CIE Political Department, Government of India, Agent to the Governor-General in Central India
- Charles Alexander Innes CIE Indian Civil Service, Secretary to the Government of India, Commerce Department
- Charles Joseph Hallifax CBE Indian Civil Service, Financial Commissioner, Punjab
- Colonel Herbert Fothergill Cooke CB DSO Indian Army, Deputy Adjutant-General, Adjutant-General's Branch, Army Headquarters
- Ernest Marinus Process, Chief Engineer and Secretary to Government, Public Works Department, Bombay
- Leonard Tatham Harris, Indian Civil Service, Agency Commissioner, Madras
- Albion Rajkumar Banerji CIE Indian Civil Service, First Member of the Executive Council of His Highness the Maharaja of Mysore
- Reginald Isidore Robert Glancy CIE Indian Civil Service, Political Department of the Government of India
- Sadar-ul-Maham, Finance Department, His Exalted Highness the Nizam's Government
- William Robert Gourlay CIE Indian Civil Service, Private Secretary to His Excellency the Governor of Bengal
- Colonel Kenneth Wigram CB CBE DSO Indian Army, Commandant, 2nd Battalion, 2nd King Edward's Own Gurkha Rifles (The Sirmoor Rifles), late Director of Staff Duties, General Staff Branch, Army Headquarters
- Raj Bahadur Major-General Dewan Bishan Das CIE Revenue Minister, Jammu and Kashmir State, Sirinagar

=== The Most Distinguished Order of Saint Michael and Saint George ===
Star of the Order of Saint Michael and Saint George

==== Knight Grand Cross of the Order of St Michael and St George (GCMG) ====
- Sir Hugh Charles Clifford KCMG Governor and Commander-in-Chief of the Colony and Protectorate of Nigeria

==== Knight Commander of the Order of St Michael and St George (KCMG) ====
- The Hon. Richard Anderson Squires KC Prime Minister of Newfoundland
- The Hon. James Mitchell CMG Premier, Minister for Lands and Colonial Treasurer of the State of Western Australia
- The Hon. Edwin Mitchelson, Member of the Legislative Council of the Dominion of New Zealand
- Sir Charles Stewart Addis Kt Manager of the Hong Kong and Shanghai Banking Corporation, for valuable services to His Majesty's Government in connection with finance in China

Honorary Knight Commander

- His Highness Abdullah ibni Almerhum, Sultan Ahmad Ma'azaam Shah, Sultan of Pahang

==== Companion of the Order of St Michael and St George (CMG) ====
- Sidney Browning, lately Provincial Commissioner, Uganda Protectorate
- Clifford Henderson Hay MVO Secretary to the Premier's Department, State of New South Wales, and General Secretary to the Conference of Premiers of the Australian States
- Benjamin Horsburgh, Controller of Revenue, Island of Ceylon
- Lieutenant-Colonel William James Parke Hume, British Resident, Perak, Federated Malay States
- John Maxwell, Deputy Chief Commissioner, Administrative and Political Department, Gold Coast
- Frederick William Platts, Stipendiary Magistrate, Dominion of New Zealand
- The Hon. Arthur Robinson, Attorney-General and Member of the Legislative Council of the State of Victoria
- Major James Lewis Sleeman CBE MVO recognition of services as Director of Military Training, New Zealand Military Forces
- Rowland Arthur Charles Sperling, a Counsellor in the Foreign Office
- Sir Percy Lyham Loraine Bt Counsellor in His Majesty's Diplomatic Service
- Herbert Ashley Cunard Cummins OBE charge of His Majesty's Legation in Mexico since 1917
- Harold George Parlett, Japanese Secretary to His Majesty's Embassy at Tokyo

Honorary Companions

- Mohammadu, Sultan of Sokoto, Nigeria

=== The Most Eminent Order of the Indian Empire ===
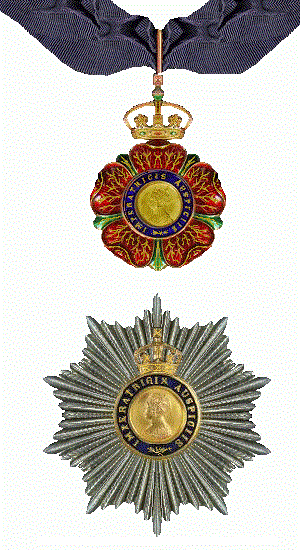
Riband, badge and star of the Knight Grand Commander of the Order of the Indian Empire

==== Knight Commander (KCIE) ====
- William Didsbury Sheppard CIE late Indian Civil Service, Member of the Council of India
- Ludovic Charles Barter CSI CIE OBE Indian Civil Service, Finance Member, United Provinces Government
- Lieutenant-Colonel Armine Brereton Dew CSI CIE Political Department, Government of India, Agent to the Governor-General and Chief Commissioner in Baluchistan
- Kawab Khan-i-Zaman Khan, Chief of Annib, North-West Frontier Province
- Nawab Haji Fateh Ali Khan, Kazilbash CIE Lahore, Punjab
- Raja Muhammad Nazim Khan CIE Tham or Ruler of Hunza Gilgit Agency, Kashmir
- Major-General William Rice Edward CB CMG Indian Medical Service, Director-General, Indian Medical Service
- Evan Maconochie CSI Indian Civil Service, Agent to the Governor in Kathiawar, Bombay
- Sardar Mysore Kantaraj Urs CSI Mysore Civil Service, Dewan of Mysore
- Colonel William Henry Willcox CB CMG FRCP late Medical Adviser to the Civil Administration in Mesopotamia

==== Companion (CIE) ====
- John Edwin Clapham Jukes, Indian Civil Service, Joint Secretary, Finance Department, Government of India
- Ernest Burdon, Indian Civil Service, Financial Adviser, Military Finance
- Nawab Muhammad Ahmad Said Khan MBE MLC of Chitari, Bulandshah District, United Provinces
- Herbert Edward West Martindell, Chief Engineer and Secretary, Public Works Department, Burma
- Alexander Montgemerie, Indian Civil Service, Secretary, Political Department, Bombay
- Evelyn Robins Abbott, Indian Civil Service, Commissioner, Multan Division, Punjab
- James Cowlishaw Smith, Indian Civil Service, Magistrate and Collector, United Provinces
- Percy Beart Thomas, Inspector-General of Police, Madras
- John Richard Cunningham, Director of Public Instruction, Assam
- Stephen Cox MBE Chief Conservator of Forests, Madras
- Leslie Maurice Crump, Indian Civil Service, Political Department, Government of India, lately Political Agent, Phulkian States, Punjab
- Hugh Kynaston Briscoe, Indian Civil Service, Collector of Cuttack, Bihar and Orissa
- Temp. Lieutenant-Colonel Henry Rivers Nevill OBE Indian Civil Service, Indian Army Reserve of Officers, Assistant Adjutant-General, Army Headquarters
- Lieutenant-Colonel Benjamin Hobbs Deare, Indian Medical Service, Principal, Medical College, Calcutta, Bengal
- Henry Vernon Barstow Hare Scott, Indian Police, Deputy Director, Central Intelligence
- Robert William Church, Mining Engineer to the Railway Board
- Major Lewis Macclesfield Heath MC Commandant, Seistan Levy Corps
- Major Lionel Edward Lang MC late Commandant, Seistan Levy Corps
- Raj Bahadur Milkhi Ram, Senior Vice-President of the Municipal Committee, Lahore, Punjab
- Rao Bahadur Kesho Govind Damle, Pleader, Vice-Chairman of the District Board, Akola, Central Provinces
- James Walls Mackison, Executive Engineer, Bombay Municipality, Bombay
- Arthur Lambert Playfair, of Dibrugarh, Assam
- Raj Bahadur Babu Abinash Chandra Stem, Member of Council, Jaipur State, Rajputana
- Maganlal Thakordas Balmukanda Modi, Merchant, Bombay
- Doctor Mohendra Nath Banerjee, Medical Practitioner, Principal, Carmichael Medical College, Belgatchia, Bengal

=== Members of the Order of the Companions of Honour (CH) ===
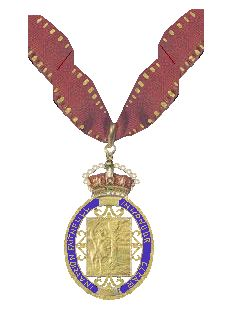
The riband and badge of the "Companions of Honour"

- Harold Arthur, Viscount Dillon, Chairman of Trustees, National Portrait Gallery, since 1894
- The Reverend Arthur Cayley Headlam Regius Professor of Divinity, Oxford University, and Canon of Christchurch, Oxford, since 1918
- Sir William Robertson Nicoll Editor of the British Weekly since 1886

=== The Royal Victorian Order ===
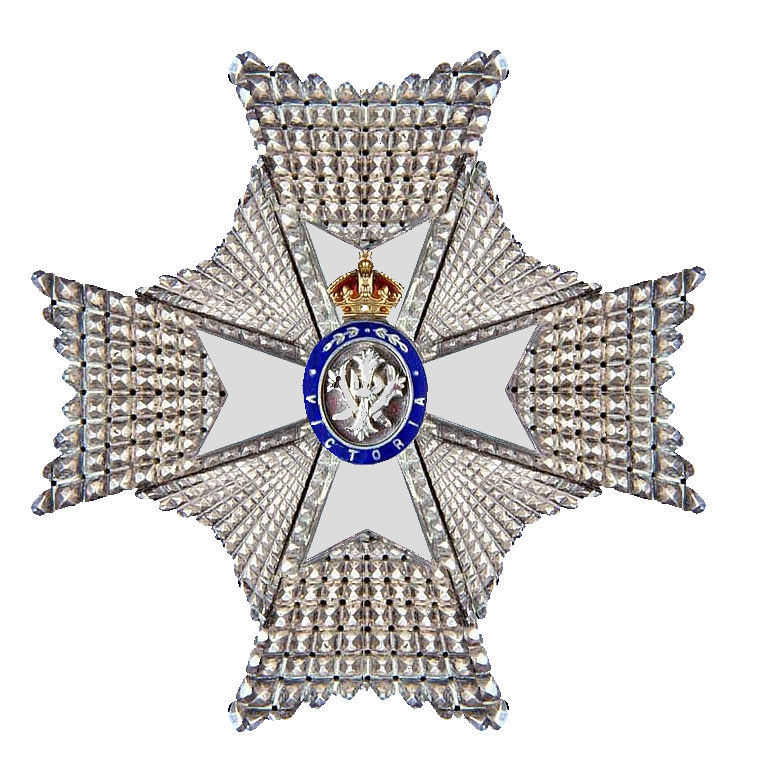
Insignia of a Knight / Dames Commander of the Royal Victorian Order

==== Knight Grand Cross of the Royal Victorian Order (GCVO) ====
- Colonel Sir Arthur Davidson KCB KCVO

==== Knight Commander of the Royal Victorian Order (KCVO) ====
- Sir Walter Parratt CVO (dated 10 February 1921)
- Ernest de la Rue (dated 7 May 1921)
- Robert Alfred McCall KC

==== Commander of the Royal Victorian Order (CVO) ====
- Sir Ernest Hodder-Williams
- Lieutenant-Colonel Ralph Verney CIE
- Ralph Endersby Harwood CBE
- Thomas William Smith CBE
- Percy John de Paravicini MVO

==== Member of the Royal Victorian Order, 4th class (MVO) ====
- Major the Honorable Arthur Hay
- The Reverend Walter Philip Besley
- John Hilton Carter (dated 7 May 1921)
- Lieutenant-Colonel Rupert Stewart
- Alfred Robert Brickwood Vaux
- Horace West
- The Reverend Herbert Francis Westlake

==== Member of the Royal Victorian Order, 5th class (MVO) ====
- Thomas Henry Norton

=== Kaisar-i-Hind Medal ===
First Class

- The Reverend Canon Arthur Whitcliffe Davies, Principal, St. John's College, Agra, United Provinces
- George Rusby Kaye, Curator, Bureau of Education, Government of India
- The Reverend William Meston, Professor and Bursar, Madras Christian College, Madras
- M. R. Ry. Diwan Bahadur Duruseti Seshagiri Rao Pantulu Garu, President, Godavari District Board, Madras
- The Reverend Ernest Muir, Missionary and Doctor, Bengal
- Sri Gadahar Ramanuj Das, Mahant of Emar Math, Puri, Bihar and Orissa
- Lee Ah Yain, an elected member of the Rangoon Municipal Committee, Burma

=== Air Force Cross (AFC) ===
- Flight Lieutenant Eric Blake Grenfell

=== Air Force Medal (AFM) ===
==== Awarded a Bar to the Air Force Medal (AFM*) ====
- Sgt. Major II Walter Robert Mayes DSM AFM
- Flight Sgt. Sidney James Heath AFM

=== Imperial Service Order (ISO) ===
Home Civil Service

- George Theodore Knecht, Head of Establishments, Rules and Accounts Branch, Friendly Societies Registry
- Griffith John Williams, Senior Inspector of Mines, Mines Department
- Annie Alice Heap, Superintendent, Exchange Staff, London Telephone Service, General Post Office
- William Harvey, Chief Clerk in Department of Prison Commission for Scotland
- Francis Stephen Sheridan DL Chief Clerk, Congested Districts Board (Ireland)

Colonial Civil Service

- Capt. Hubert Berkeley, District Officer, Upper Perak, Federated Malay States
- Edward Albert Counsel, Surveyor-General and Secretary for Lands, State of Tasmania
- John Smith Erbynn, Chief Clerk, Ashanti Political Service
- George Gozzard Martin, Secretary to the Attorney-General, State of South Australia
- Alfred Ernest Clarence Ross, Postmaster-General, Colony of Trinidad and Tobago
- George Albert Woodcock, lately Magistrate and First Clerk, Magistracy, Colony of Hong Kong

Indian Civil Service

- William Anderson Hasted, Director of Survey, Madras
- Maumg Hla Baw (1) District Judge, Prome and Tharrawaddy, Burma
- Charles St. Leger Teyen, Assistant Secretary, Finance Department, United Provinces Secretariat
- M. R. Ry. Rao Bahadur Paruvakattil Narayana Menon Avargal, Secretary to the Commissioner of Revenue Settlement, Survey, Land Records and Agriculture, Madras
- Henry Bryan Gilmore, Deputy Registrar, High Court of Judicature, Lahore, Punjab
- Major William Daniel Neal, Indian Medical Department, Assistant to the Superintendent, Medical College Hospital, Bengal
- Joseph Balthazar de Silva, Personal Assistant to the Military Secretary to His Excellency the Governor of Bombay

=== Imperial Service Medal (ISM) ===
- Hari Charan, Jemadar in the Legislative Department of the Government of India, in recognition of long and meritorious service
