= Walter Browne (disambiguation) =

Walter Browne (1949–2015) was an Australian-born American chess grandmaster and poker player.

Walter Browne may refer to:

- Walter Browne (priest) (1855–1959), Archdeacon of Rochester
- Walter R. Browne (1842–1884), English civil engineer and Christian writer

== See also ==
- Walter Brown (disambiguation)
