= John Thomas Pratt =

British diplomat and barrister (1876–1970)

Sir John Thomas Pratt KBE CMG (13 January 1876 – 23 January 1970) was an English barrister who became a British Consul-General in China and later headed the Far East Section of the wartime Ministry of Information.

== Early life ==
Pratt was the sixth son of Edward Pratt, of the Indian Salt Revenue Service. He was educated at Dulwich College and the law school of the Inns of Court. In 1898, he trained as a Student Interpreter in China, and in 1905 was called to the Bar from the Middle Temple, gaining a Certificate of Honour.

== Career ==
In 1909, Pratt was appointed as British Assessor in Mixed Court at Shanghai. The next year, he became a British Vice-Consul in China, and in 1913 Consul at Tsinan, then in 1919 Consul-General at Tsinan. In 1922, he was transferred as Consul-General at Nanking, and in 1924 took up the same post in Shanghai. In 1925, he was posted to the Foreign Office in Whitehall and from 1929 was a Counsellor in His Majesty's Diplomatic Service. He retired in 1938, but as a result of the Second World War from 1939 to 1941 headed the Far East Section of the wartime Ministry of Information.

Pratt was also the Foreign Office's representative on the Universities China Committee, chaired the British and Chinese Corporation, and was vice-chairman of the Governing Body of the School of Oriental and African Studies.

== Personal life ==
In 1914, Pratt married firstly Edith Violet, a daughter of James Houson Parker, of Great Baddow, Essex, and Slatwoods, East Cowes. They had one daughter. His wife died in 1937, and in 1943 Pratt married secondly Dorothy, a daughter of A. H. Barker, of Beckenham.

Of Pratt's brothers, Frederick Greville Pratt (1869–1949), followed their father by joining the Indian Civil Service, while another, William Henry Pratt (1887–1969), became the actor Boris Karloff.

== Honours ==
- Companion of the Order of St Michael and St George, 1919
- Knight Commander of the Most Excellent Order of the British Empire, 1929 New Year Honours
