= Arthur Duff (Royal Navy officer) =

Royal Navy Admiral (1874–1952)

Admiral Sir Arthur Duff KCB JP DL
- Born: April 19, 1874
- Died: April 5, 1952
- Relatives: A. G. Duff (father)
- Military career
- Allegiance: United Kingdom
- Branch: Royal Navy
- Rank: Admiral
- Unit: HMS Birmingham
- Commands: HMS Birmingham (1913-1916)
- Known for: Sinking U-15, Command of HMS Birmingham at Dogger Bank and Jutland
- Conflicts: First World War; Battle of Dogger Bank; Battle of Jutland
- Awards: Knight Commander of the Order of the Bath (KCB)

Admiral Sir Arthur Allan Morison Duff, KCB, JP, DL (19 April 1874 – 5 April 1952) was a Royal Navy officer.

Duff was the son of General A. G. Duff.

In 1913, Duff was given command of the light cruiser HMS Birmingham. Duff was in command of the ship when, on 9 August 1914, she rammed the German submarine U-15 off Fair Isle, cutting her in two, becoming the first German submarine to be sunk in the First World War. In 1916, Duff later commanded Birmingham at the Battle of Dogger Bank and the Battle of Jutland.

Duff was promoted to KCB in the 1929 New Year Honours. He was promoted to Admiral on 8 May 1930 and was placed on the Retired List on 15 May.
