= James Carmichael (engineer) =

Lieutenant-Colonel Sir James Forrest Halkett Carmichael CMG CBE (8 July 1868 – 12 August 1934) was a British Army officer, engineer and colonial administrator.

Carmichael was the son of an Indian civil servant. He was educated at Clifton College and the Royal Military Academy, Woolwich, and was commissioned into the Royal Engineers in 1887. He was promoted captain in 1898, major in 1906, and brevet lieutenant-colonel in 1919.

From 1889 to 1900 he served abroad, successively in India, Aden, Somaliland and Burma. From 1900 to 1904 he served in the office of the Inspector-General of Fortifications at the War Office in London and with the Ordnance Survey. In 1904 he retired from the army and was appointed head of the Engineering and Works Department of the Crown Agents for the Colonies.

During the First World War he rejoined the army and served on the Armaments Output Committee at the War Office, and later as personal assistant for metals to the director of materials at the Ministry of Munitions and then as assistant director of munitions supply and on the High Speed Steel Committee.

After the war he returned to his post at the Crown Agents, later being promoted to chief engineer. In 1921 he was appointed one of the Crown Agents, retiring in 1932.

Carmichael was appointed Commander of the Order of the British Empire (CBE) in 1918 and Companion of the Order of St Michael and St George (CMG) in the 1920 New Year Honours, and was knighted in the 1929 New Year Honours. He was also a claimant to the Earldom of Hyndford.
