= James Humphreys (lawyer) =

James Humphreys (c. 1768 – 29 November 1830) was a Welsh barrister, law reformer and legal writer. He was educated at Shrewsbury School and called to the bar in 1800 by Lincoln's Inn. Politically he was a liberal. His major publication in the field of law reform was Observations on the Actual State of the English Laws of Real Property, with the outlines of a Code (1826).

== Life ==
A native of Montgomeryshire, Humphreys was articled to a solicitor named Yeomans at Worcester. He then entered Lincoln's Inn in November 1789, read with Charles Butler, was called to the bar (25 June 1800), and obtained a good practice as a conveyancer.

In politics Humphreys was a Whig and liberal, and was friendly with Charles James Fox, Henry Clifford, Sir James Mackintosh, and Sir Francis Burdett. He went to John Horne Tooke's parties at Wimbledon, and delivered a course of lectures on law at the newly founded University of London.

Humphreys died on 29 November 1830, in Upper Woburn Place, London.

== Works ==
Humphreys's major work, Observations on the Actual State of the English Laws of Real Property, with the outlines of a Code (London, 1826, 2nd edit. 1827), gave him a reputation as a legal reformer. Fox is said to have suggested the work, but it came from association with Charles Butler and with the school of analytical jurists led by Jeremy Bentham and John Austin. Bentham wrote a flattering notice in The Westminster Review. Changes that Humphreys proposed were opposed at the time, but most were later adopted in the 19th century: shortened forms of conveyance, registration of title, abolition of copyhold tenure, increase in the number of judges, improvement of procedure, the alteration of the law of descents, and others. Edward Burtenshaw Sugden, John James Park, and others published criticisms of Humphreys's proposals, but his scheme was praised by James Kent in America. The need for radical change in the land laws was recognised by the appointment in 1827 of the real property commission. Humphreys also wrote Suggestions respecting the Stamp Duties affecting Real and Personal Property, published posthumously in 1830, and other pamphlets.

== See also ==
- List of Old Salopians
