= Walter Brown =

Walter Brown may refer to:

== Politics ==
- Walter Brown (Lord Provost) (c. 1770–c. 1840), Lord Provost of Edinburgh, 1827–1829
- Walter L. Brown (1846–1924), New York politician
- Walter Folger Brown (1869–1961), U.S. Postmaster General
- Walter George Brown (1875–1940), Canadian member of parliament, 1939–1940
- Walter B. Brown (1920–1998), American politician and businessman from South Carolina
- Walt Brown (politician) (Walter Frederick Brown, born 1926), Oregon state senator, Socialist Party USA presidential candidate

== Sports ==
- Jumbo Brown (Walter George Brown, 1907–1966), American baseball player
- Walter Brown (baseball) (1915–1991), American baseball pitcher
- Walter Brown (canoeist) (1925–2011), Australian canoer
- Walter Brown (cricketer) (1868–1954), Indian-born English cricketer
- Walter Brown (footballer, born 1867) (1867–?), English football forward
- Walt Brown (racing driver) (1911–1951), American racecar driver
- Walter A. Brown (1905–1964), founding owner of the Boston Celtics

== Other ==
- Walter Francis Brown (1853–1929), American painter and illustrator
- Walter Lewis Brown (1861–1931), American librarian
- Walter Brown (soldier) (1885–1942), Australian recipient of the Victoria Cross
- Walter Brown (mathematician) (1886–1957), Scottish mathematician and engineer
- Walter Brown (singer) (1917–1956), American blues shouter who sang with Jay McShann's band
- Walter Brown (actor) (1927–2013), actor from New Zealand
- Walt Brown (creationist) (born 1937), lecturer on creationism
- Walter Brown (chaplain) (1910–1944), Canadian military chaplain
- Walter the Softy, a fictional character in The Beano, also known as Walter Brown
- USS Walter S. Brown, US Navy escort destroyer named after a machinist's mate killed at Pearl Harbor

== See also ==
- Walter Browne (disambiguation)
