= Benjamin Horsburgh =

British colonial administrator (1868-1935)

The Honourable Benjamin Horsburgh CMG
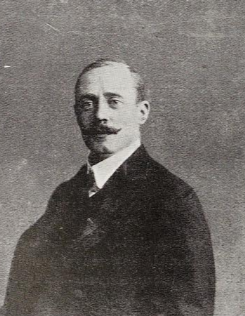
- Benjamin Horsburgh c.1905

Acting Governor of British Ceylon
- In office 23 October 1922 – 5 November 1922

Personal details
- Born: 10 April 1868
- Died: 10 April 1935 (aged 67)
- Education: University of Edinburgh
- Occupation: Colonial administrator

Benjamin Horsburgh CMG (10 April 1868 – 10 April 1935) was a colonial administrator who served as acting Governor of British Ceylon.

== Early life and education ==
Horsburgh was born on 10 April 1868 in Scotland. He was educated at Heriot's School and University of Edinburgh where he took his MA degree.

== Career ==
Horsburgh entered the Ceylon Civil Service in 1889. He held various appointments at several Kacheries before he was appointed in 1906 as Chairman of Colombo Municipal Council and Mayor of Colombo. At various times he served as Government Agent in the North Central, North-Western and Northern Provinces. From 1919–20, he was Commissioner of Excise; Food Controller, and Controller of Revenue.

He acted as Colonial Secretary on several occasions, and administered the government as acting Governor of Ceylon for a short period in 1922. He retired from the service in 1923 and settled in Edinburgh.

== Personal life and death ==
Horsburgh held a commission as a volunteer in the Ceylon Garrison Artillery, retiring with the rank of Major and was awarded the Officer's Decoration. He published various papers on the origin of place names in Ceylon for the "Ceylon Antiquary". He never married.

Horsburgh died on 10 April 1935.

== Honours ==
Horsburgh was appointed Companion of the Order of St Michael and St George (CMG) in the 1921 Birthday Honours.
