= Barwick Sharpe Browne =

British Army officer (1881–1963)

Lieutenant-Colonel Barwick Sharpe Browne (1881 – 27 August 1963) was a British Army officer, the first librarian of the Institute of Archaeology (1936–38), and a fellow of the Society of Antiquaries of London.

== Early life ==
Barwick Sharpe Browne was born in 1881. His father was Walter Raleigh Browne, a civil engineer. He was educated at Shrewsbury School (left 1898) and the Royal Military Academy, Woolwich.

== First World War ==
Browne was commissioned into the Royal Garrison Artillery as a second lieutenant (1900) becoming a lieutenant in 1901. He served throughout the First World War during which time he commanded a battery.

== Inter-war years ==
After leaving the army, Browne lived in London. In 1922, he married Enid Marjorie Moore at St John the Evangelist parish church in Westminster. Enid became a doctor and anaesthetist. They had two sons and a daughter. Their eldest son died in 1947 and Enid died in 1961.

Browne was the first librarian of the Institute of Archaeology (1936–38) and a fellow of the Society of Antiquaries of London.

The Brownes moved to Gloucestershire in 1938.

== Second World War ==
During the Second World War, Browne served in the Royal Air Force and the Royal Navy.

== Death ==
Browne died on 27 August 1963.
