= Percy Beart Thomas =

British police officer in India

Percy Beart Thomas CIE

Inspector-General of Police of Madras

Personal details
- Born: 1866
- Died: 15 August 1921 (aged 54–55)

Percy Beart Thomas CIE (1866 – 15 August 1921) was a British police officer in India.

Thomas was the son of the rector of Hamerton, Huntingdonshire. He was educated at Shrewsbury School and then joined the Indian Police Service, rising to be Inspector-General of Police of Madras.

He was appointed Companion of the Order of the Indian Empire (CIE) in the 1921 Birthday Honours.

Thomas died suddenly while on leave in Britain a few months before his retirement.

== See also ==
- William Beach Thomas
