= Horatio Hildyard =

English cricketer and clergyman

Personal information
- Full name: Horatio Samuel Hildyard
- Born: 17 October 1805; Winestead, Yorkshire, England
- Died: 10 April 1886 (aged 80); Loftus, Yorkshire, England
- Batting: Unknown

Domestic team information
- Years: Team
- 1832: Oxford University

Career statistics
Competition	First-class
Matches	2
Runs scored	10
Batting average	2.50
100s/50s	–/–
Top score	4
Catches/stumpings	–/–
- Source: Cricinfo, 9 May 2020

Horatio Samuel Hildyard (17 October 1805 – 10 April 1886) was an English first-class cricketer and clergyman.

The sixth son of the Rev. William Hildyard, he was born in October 1805 at Winestead, Yorkshire. He was educated at Shrewsbury School, before going up to Peterhouse, Cambridge in 1826. He was elected a fellow in 1831, and while he was a visiting fellow at the University of Oxford, Hildyard played two first-class cricket matches for Oxford University in 1832, both against the Marylebone Cricket Club.

Hildyard took holy orders in the Church of England and was ordained in June 1832 as a priest at Rochester, a post he held for just under a year until he was transferred to Carlisle in 1833. He became the curate of Little Wilbraham in Cambridgeshire from 1834–42, during which time he was also a classics lecturer at the University of Cambridge. He became a rector at Loftus in North Yorkshire from 1842 until his death there in April 1886. On 12 June 1861 he married Octavia Richardson, daughter of William Richardson, Lord Mayor of York in 1847. They had 3 sons and 4 daughters. His brother was the scholar James Hildyard.
