= Walter R. Browne =

Walter Raleigh Browne (1842 – 4 September 1884) was an English civil engineer and Christian writer.

== Career ==
He attended Trinity College, Cambridge in 1861. After graduating he became a fellow of the college in 1867. In 1874 he became the Director of Bridgewater Engineering Company. He devoted much time to the theory of mechanics and wrote many articles and papers. He worked as Secretary for the Institution of Mechanical Engineers but later resigned from this position.

He was a member of many societies including the Aristotelian Society, Philological Society, Physical Society of London and the Royal Geographical Society. He was a Christian and member of the Christian Evidence Society. He was an original council member of the Society for Psychical Research and took interest in metaphysics. On 27 and 28 April 1876 he debated the atheist Charles Bradlaugh at Victoria Hall, Leeds on the topic of miracles.

His book The Inspiration of the New Testament (1880) was endorsed by the Archbishop of Canterbury. He translated the second edition of Rudolf Clausius’ German physics textbook The Mechanical Theory of Heat in 1879. In August 1884 he went to Canada with his wife to attend a meeting for the British Association. After he arrived in Montreal he became ill and suffered from typhoid fever. He was taken to hospital but died on 4 September.

His son was Barwick Sharpe Browne.

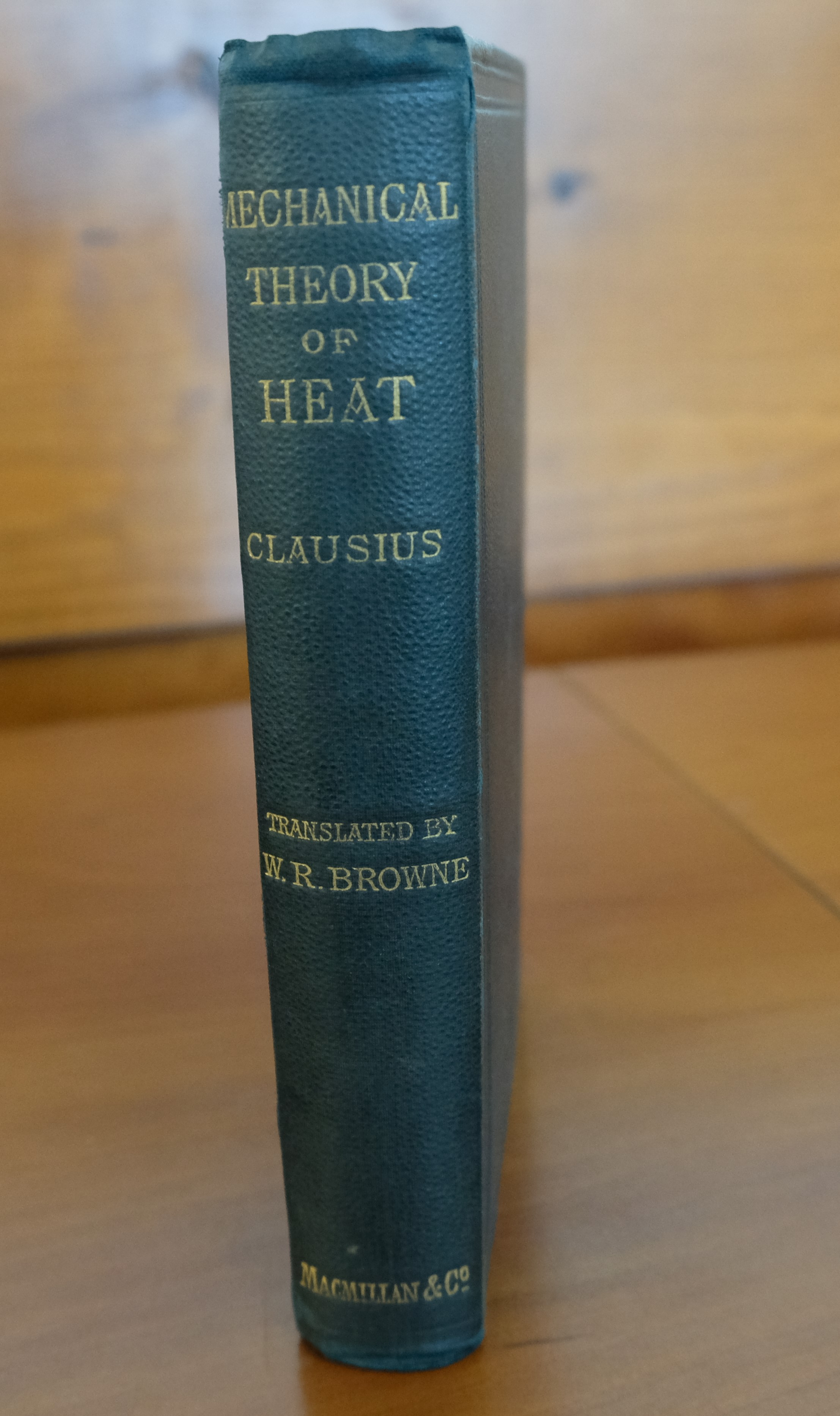
1879 edition of Rudolf Clausius' "The Mechanical Theory of Heat," translated to English by Browne

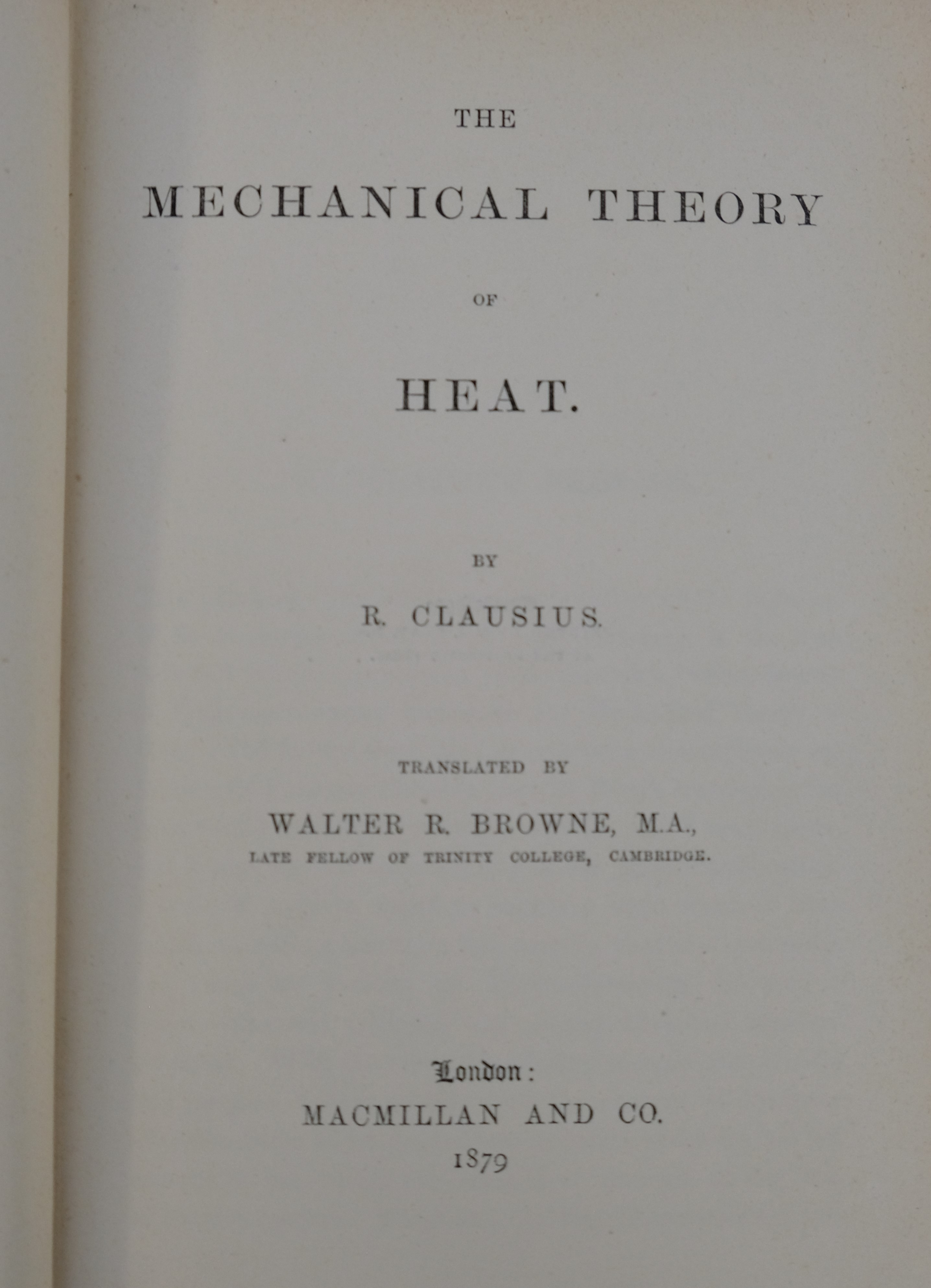
Title page of a 1879 edition of Rudolf Clausius' "The Mechanical Theory of Heat," translated to English by Browne

== Publications ==
- Can Miracles Be Proved Possible?: Verbatim Report of the Two Nights Public Debate Between Messrs. C. Bradlaugh & W. R. Browne ... Leeds, on April 27th and 28th (1876)
- The Inspiration of the New Testament (1880)
- The Foundations of Mechanics (1882)
- The Student's Mechanics (1883)
