= Hubert Berkeley =

British colonial officer

Hubert Berkeley ISO
- Born: 25 June 1864
- Died: 27 April 1942 (aged 77)
- Occupation: Colonial administrator in Malaya
- Years active: 1886-1925

Hubert Berkeley ISO (25 June 1864 – 27 April 1942) was a British colonial administrator who served as District Officer of Upper Perak, Federated Malay States, from 1891 – 1925. He was often referred to as the "Uncrowned King of Upper Perak".

== Early life ==
Berkeley was born into one of the oldest aristocratic families of Worcestershire, England. His father, Robert Martin Berkeley, was a descendant of the 6th Baron Berkeley, and his mother was Lady Mary Catherine Browne, daughter of the 3rd Earl of Kenmare.

In 1881, at the age of 17, he joined the Royal Navy as a midshipman, but five years later left to join the Malay Civil Service.

== Career ==
Berkeley's first appointment was as Inspector of Police in the Dindings in 1886 where he served for two years. In 1889 he joined the Perak Civil Service as Superintendent of Penghulus, Lower Perak, before being promoted to District Officer of Upper Perak in 1891.

Based at Gerik, he would remain in the post almost continuously for the next 34 years, except for an interruption of three years due to the First World War.

When war broke out he was aged 50 but this did not stop him joining up, and he was given a commission as Captain in the 6th Battalion (Reserve) Royal Worcestershire Regiment. He served in the Gallipoli Campaign, in Sudan, and in Sinai and Palestine.

In 1917 he returned to the Federated Malay States in his former position in Upper Perak. A few years later, when he reached the official retirement age, he sought leave to remain in his post and, due to good service, was permitted to continue in his position by special concession.

In 1925, aged 61, he finally retired having remained in Upper Perak almost continuously for 34 years. On his return to England he took up the life of a country gentleman and became a farmer, a Justice of the Peace, and served on various committees, having been awarded the Imperial Service Order in 1921.

When the Second World War broke out in 1939 he joined the Home Guard, despite his 76 years, which led him to be referred to as "the oldest Tommy in the army", and he died in 1942.

== Character ==
Berkeley was known for his eccentric behaviour and acting like a 'white Rajah', treating the isolated region of Upper Perak as his personal domain which led him to being called 'the King of Grik' and the 'Uncrowned King of Upper Perak'.

It was said that he affected royal airs, influenced by his aristocratic background, acting not as a civil servant but as part Malay chief and part English squire. Described as acting as a benevolent autocrat, he was popular with the local people whom he got to know intimately during his residency of over thirty years, as described in his diaries. He lived as a Malay, often dressed the same way and ate the same food. He never had a car but travelled everywhere by horse or elephant.

In remote Upper Perak he was able to exercise his duties independently receiving little interference from the Resident or officialdom, which he shunned. On one occasion it was said that to prevent a visit by superior, the Resident, he had a tree felled which blocked the road forcing him to give up his journey.

Another account refers to his hearing of a civil case at Gopeng Court which he decided to resolve by requiring the plaintiff and their witnesses to compete in a tug of war against the defendant and their witnesses. He was reprimanded by Frank Swettenham, the Resident of Perak, who reminded him to try all cases based on the evidence. He never married but it was reported that he had fathered a number of children with local women. When he announced his retirement it was reported that: "his departure will be greatly regretted by the Malays of the district who hold him in great veneration".
