= Peter Blagg =

English cricketer and soldier

Personal information
- Full name: Peter Henry Blagg
- Born: 11 September 1918; Basford, Nottinghamshire, England
- Died: 18 March 1943 (aged 24) near Donbaik, Burma
- Batting: Right-handed
- Role: Wicketkeeper

Career statistics
Competition	First-class
Matches	10
Runs scored	67
Batting average	8.37
100s/50s	0/0
Top score	28 not out
Catches/stumpings	17/12
- Source: Cricinfo, 16 April 2014

Peter Henry Blagg (11 September 1918 – 18 March 1943) was an English first-class cricketer and soldier.

== Life and career ==
Blagg was educated at Shrewsbury School, where he played in the First XI from 1935 to 1937. He went up to Oxford University, where after his exams in 1939 he replaced Manning Clark as wicket-keeper in the university team, playing the remaining ten matches of the season and gaining his Blue.

He made a number of stumpings off the Oxford spin bowlers. In the match against Marylebone Cricket Club (MCC) he stumped three off the leg-spin of Algernon Marsham, including Denis Compton. He batted low in the order, with a highest score of 28 not out against Somerset. His last first-class match was Oxford's victory over Cambridge University.

Blagg was also awarded a Blue for football in 1939.

In World War II Blagg served as a lieutenant in the Royal Welch Fusiliers. He died in action near Donbaik in Burma in March 1943, and is commemorated on the Rangoon Memorial.
