= Henry Karslake =

British Army officer

Lieutenant-General Sir Henry Karslake KCB KCSI CMG DSO
- Born: 10 February 1879
- Died: 19 October 1942 (aged 63)
- Education: Harrow School; Royal Military Academy, Woolwich
- Military career
- Allegiance: United Kingdom
- Branch: British Army
- Service years: 1898–1938; 1940
- Rank: Lieutenant-General
- Commands: Lines of Communication, British Expeditionary Force (1940); Baluchistan District (1933–35)
- Conflicts: Second Boer War; First World War; Second World War; Battle of France
- Awards: Knight Commander of the Order of the Bath; Knight Commander of the Order of the Star of India; Companion of the Order of St Michael and St George; Distinguished Service Order; Mentioned in Despatches (11); Knight of the Legion of Honour (France)

Lieutenant-General Sir Henry Karslake, KCB, KCSI, CMG, DSO (10 February 1879 – 19 October 1942) was a British Army officer. He was Colonel Commandant, Royal Artillery from 1937 to his death in 1942.

== Biography ==
The only son of Lewis Karslake, Henry Karslake was educated at Harrow School and Royal Military Academy, Woolwich.

From 1933 until September 1935, he was Commander, Baluchistan District, where he directed the rescue operations in the aftermath of the 1935 Quetta earthquake. Created a Knight Commander of the Order of the Star of India on the relinquishment of his command, he was promoted to lieutenant-general in April 1936 and appointed a Knight Commander of the Order of the Bath in 1937. He retired from the army in 1938.

During the Second World War, he was briefly recalled to active service to assist with the evacuation of the British Army, and was briefly General Officer Commanding British troops in France in 1940.

== Bibliography ==
- Smart, Nick (2005). Biographical Dictionary of British Generals of the Second World War. Barnsley: Pen & Sword. ISBN 978-1-84415-049-6.
