= James Hildyard =

English classical scholar (1809–1887)

The Reverend James Hildyard
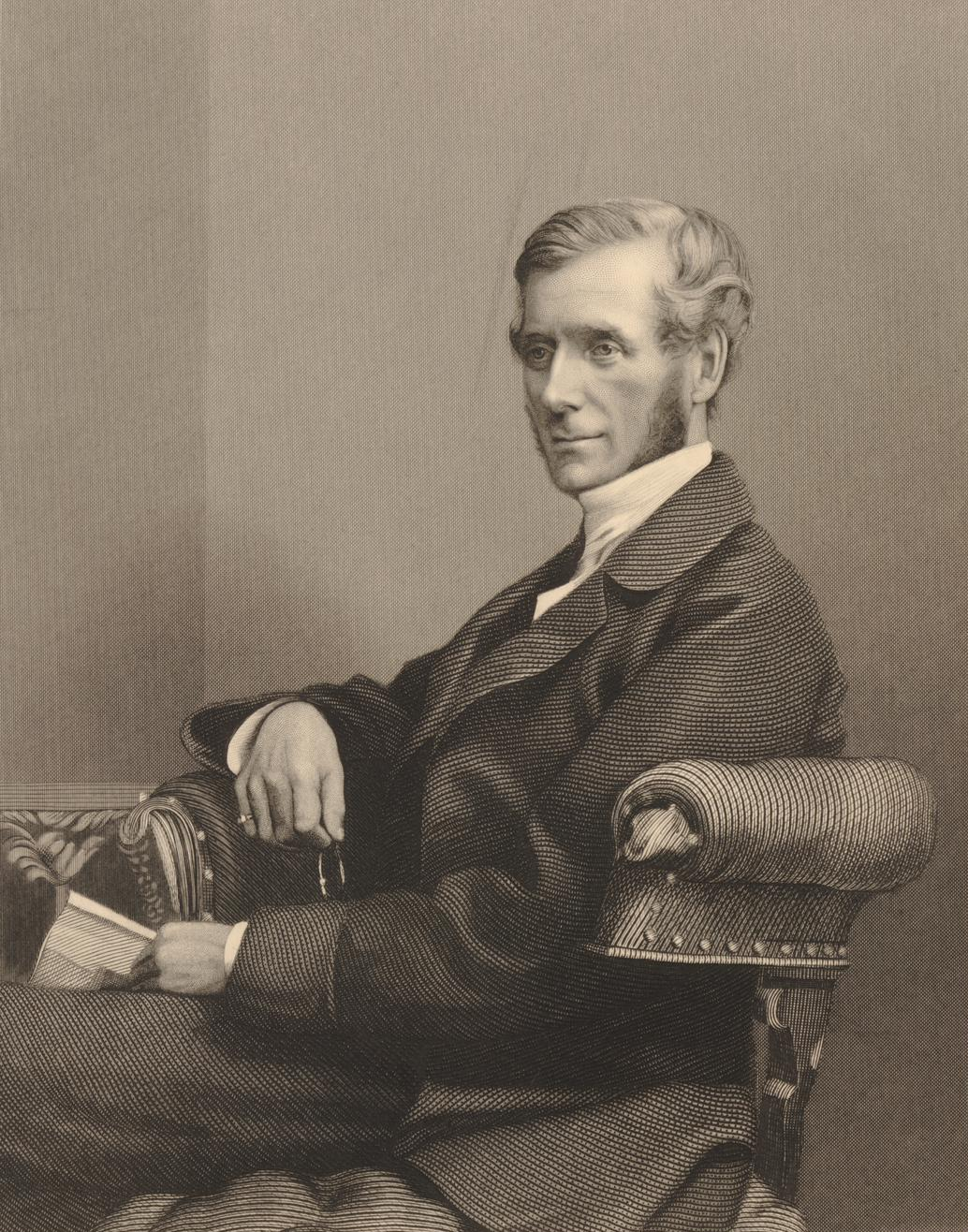
- Born: 11 April 1809; Winestead, Yorkshire, England
- Died: 27 August 1887 (aged 78); Ingoldsby, Lincolnshire, England
- Education: Christ’s College, Cambridge
- Spouse: Elizabeth Kinderley (m. 1847)
- Children: 3
- Parent(s): William Hildyard; Catherine Grant
- Relatives: Horatio Hildyard (brother); Robert Hildyard (MP) (brother)

James Hildyard (11 April 1809 – 27 August 1887) was an English classical scholar.

== Life and career ==
James Hildyard was born in Winestead on 11 April 1809, the eighth son of the Rev. William Hildyard and his wife Catherine Grant. He educated under Dr. Samuel Butler at Shrewsbury from 1820 to 1829. From 1826 he was the head of the school, and in April 1829 was the chief person in a rebellion known as the 'Beef Row.' In October of the same year he was entered as a pensioner of Christ's College, Cambridge, where, through the influence of Dr. John Kaye, he was at once elected to a Tancred divinity studentship, then worth about £113 a year. In January 1833 he graduated as a senior optime in mathematics, second in the first class of the classical tripos, and chancellor's medallist, and was immediately elected fellow of his college. In due course he became classical lecturer and tutor. He proceeded B.A. 1833, M.A. 1836, and B.D. 1846. In 1843 he was senior proctor. During fourteen years' residence at the university he greatly improved the method of college tuition, and wrote more than one pamphlet against the system of private tuition. He wrote and spoke in favour of the 'voluntary theological examinations.' He spent some time upon a laborious edition of some of the plays of Plautus, with Latin notes and glossary. For two years, 1843 and 1844, he was Cambridge preacher at the Chapel Royal, Whitehall, when large congregations were present, and a printed selection from the discourses had a rapid sale. About this period he fought the battle of the black gown versus the surplice, his opponent being the Rev. Frederick Oakeley, who afterwards went over to the church of Rome. His foreign travels included tours in Greece, Smyrna, and Turkey. At Athens he caught a fever, and narrowly escaped being bled to death by King Otho's German physician. In June 1846 he accepted the college living of Ingoldsby, Lincolnshire. He found the church and parsonage in a ruinous condition, but in the course of two or three years he restored the church and built a new rectory. He was always a consistent advocate of the revision of the Book of Common Prayer, and printed two octavo volumes on the subject.

On 19 August 1847 he married Elizabeth Kinderley, the only daughter of George Kinderley of Lincoln's Inn. They had a son and 2 daughters.

He died at Ingoldsby on 27 August 1887, at the age of 78.

== Works ==
- 'Epigrammata, Carmen Græcum, Carmen Latinum, Oratio Latina,' 1828.
- 'M. A. Plauti Menæchmei cum notis,' 1836.
- 'M. A. Plauti Aulularia, recensuit notisque instruxit,' 1839.
- 'Five Sermons on the Parable of the Rich Man and Lazarus. To which is added a proposed Plan for a systematic Study of Theology in the University,' 1841.
- 'The Obligation of the University to provide for the Education of Members designed for Holy Orders,' Cambridge, 1841.
- 'The University System of Private Tuition examined,' 1844.
- 'Further consideration on the University System of Education,' 1845.
- 'Sermons chiefly Practical,' 1845.
- 'Abridgment of the Sunday Morning Service, urged in a Letter to the Bishop of Ely,' Grantham, 1856.
- 'Further Arguments in favour of the Abridgment of the Morning Service,' 4th ed., 1856.
- 'The People's Call for a Revision of the Liturgy, in a Letter to Lord Palmerston,' Grantham, 1857.
- 'Reply to the Bishops in Convocation, February 10, 1858, also in the House of Lords, May 6, 1858, on Lord Ebury's Motion for a Revision of the Liturgy, in a series of Letters to the "Church Chronicle" and "National Standard,"' signed Ingoldsby, 1858; 3rd ed. 1862–3, 2 vols.
