= Lee Ah Yain =

Burmese politician (1874–1932)

- 李遐養
- Born: April 1874
- Died: 17 April 1932 (aged 57–58)
- Occupations: barrister and political figure

Sir Lee Ah Yain (Chinese: 李遐養; April 1874 – 17 April 1932) was a barrister and political figure of mixed Chinese and Burmese origin in British Burma who served as Minister of Forests.

Lee was educated at the University of Cambridge and was called to the English bar by Lincoln's Inn.

He received the Kaisar-i-Hind Medal, First Class in 1921 and was knighted in 1929.
