= Browne Medal =

The Browne Medals (also known as the Sir William Browne's Medals) are gold medals which since 1775 have been awarded for annual undergraduate competitions in Latin and Greek poetry at the University of Cambridge.

Sir William Browne, who had been president of the College of Physicians, died in 1774. His will left an endowment to the university:

Sir William Browne having directed his executors to produce a die for annually striking of two medals of gold, of five guineas value each, to be sent to the vice-chancellor of Cambridge about the beginning of January, to be given by him, at the following commencement, to two undergraduates, one for the best Greek Ode in imitation of Sappho, the other for the best Latin ode in imitation of Horace, on a subject to be appointed by the Vice-Chancellor; also one other gold medal, of like value, to be given by him to the undergraduate who shall produce the best Greek epigram after the model of Anthologia, and the best Latin epigram after the model of Martial.

The die for the medals was designed and engraved by Lewis Pingo. The medals for the Greek ode and the Latin ode were first awarded in 1775. The third medal, for epigrams, was first awarded in 1776. In 1858, the epigrams medal was split in two, with one medal awarded for the best Greek epigram, and one for the best Latin epigram. At first, these split epigram medals were half the weight of the other medals. The die for the half-weight medals was created by Leonard Charles Wyon after Pingo's original. Only ten of these half-weight medals were ever awarded. In 1866, a gift of £200 from Edward Herbert, 3rd Earl of Powis, then newly High Steward of the University, allowed the Greek and Latin epigram medals to be struck at the full five guinea size starting in 1867. Originally struck from gold, since World War II, the medals have been struck from bronze.

The medals are only awarded if the submitted entries are judged to be sufficiently good. The winners of the prizes are published in the Cambridge University Reporter.

The endowment, invested as a trust fund called the Browne Fund, is still used to encourage classical study at the university.

== List of recipients ==
=== 1775–1857 ===
Between 1775 and 1857, three medals were awarded annually.

List of recipients
Year	Greek ode			Latin ode			Epigrams		
Year	Recipient	College	Ref.	Recipient	College	Ref.	Recipient	College	Ref.
1775	William Cole	King's		Edward Cooke	King's		Not awarded		
1776 (Note: Because no medal for epigrams had been awarded in 1775, it was decided that two such medals would be awarded in 1776, provided two elegible candidates could be found.)	John Hayter	King's		James Six	Trinity		Edmund Sayer	Trinity	
1776	John Hayter	King's		James Six	Trinity		Thomas Thompson	Trinity	
1777	John Staples Hand	King's		Thomas Gisborne	St John's		James Six	Trinity	
1778	John Walker	Emmanuel		John Lowther	Trinity		Spencer Madan	Trinity	
1779	Bowyer Sparke	Pembroke		Joseph Pott	St John's		John Henry Michell	King's	
1780	John Henry Michell	King's		Charles Hayes	King's		John Henry Michell	King's	
1781	Joseph Goodall	King's		Benjamin Newton	Jesus		Joseph Goodall	King's	
1782	Joseph Goodall	King's		Michael Thomas Becher	King's		Joseph Goodall	King's	
1783	Richard Ramsden	Trinity		Not awarded			Jonathan Raine	Trinity	
1784	Richard Ramsden	Trinity		Jonathan Reeves	King's		George Stevenson	King's	
1784	Richard Ramsden	Trinity		Charlton Byam Wollaston	St John's		George Stevenson	King's	
1785	Jonathan Raine	Trinity		Jonathan Raine	Trinity		Jonathan Raine	Trinity	
1786	Jonathan Raine	Trinity		Abraham Moore	King's		Thomas Thompson	Trinity	
1787	Abraham Moore	King's		George Selwyn	St John's		Francis Wrangham	Magdalene	
1788	John Tweddell	Trinity		John Tweddell	Trinity		John Tweddell	Trinity	
1789	John Tweddell	Trinity		George Mathew	Trinity		John Tweddell	Trinity	
1790	Edward Maltby	Pembroke		Thomas Grimwood Taylor	Queens'		Edward Maltby	Pembroke	
1791	Edward Maltby	Pembroke		Robert Percy Smith	King's		John Doncaster	Trinity	
1792	Samuel Taylor Coleridge	Jesus		Samuel Butler	St John's		John Belcher	Clare	
1793	John Keate	King's		Samuel Butler	St John's		John Keate	King's	
1794	Samuel Butler	St John's		John Keate	King's		George Caldwell	Jesus	
1795	John Keate	King's		John D'Oyly	Corpus Christi		George Strachey	Trinity	
1796	George Strachey	Trinity		Richard Parry	Trinity		William Frere	Trinity	
1797	William Frere	Trinity		John Higgs Hunt	Trinity		William Frere	Trinity	
1798	Bartholomew Frere	Trinity		Pelham Warren	Trinity		Bartholomew Frere	Trinity	
1799	John Henry Smyth	Trinity		John Henry Smyth	Trinity		James George Durham	Corpus Christi	
1800	John Henry Smyth	Trinity		John Bird Sumner	King's		James George Durham	Corpus Christi	
1801	Robert Walpole	Trinity		F. J. Robinson	St John's		George Pryme	Trinity	
1802	George Pryme	Trinity		James Parke	Trinity		Cornwall Bayley	Christ's	
1803	Cornwall Bayley	Christ's		Henry Hartopp Knapp	King's		John Francis Plumptre	King's	
1804	William Edward Tomline	Trinity		Benjamin Heath Drury	King's		Benjamin Heath Drury	King's	
1805	William Edward Tomline	Trinity		Charles James Blomfield	Trinity		Joseph Kirkman Miller	Trinity	
1806	Charles James Blomfield	Trinity		Thomas Smart Hughes	St John's		Joseph Kirkman Miller	Trinity	
1807	Thomas Smart Hughes	St John's		John Lonsdale	King's		Edward Alderson	Trinity	
1808 (Note: A second prize for Greek ode was awarded by the vice-chancellor to Edward Valentine Blomfield in 1808.)	Thomas Rennell	King's		Edward Law	St John's		Edward Valentine Blomfield	Caius	
1808	Edward Valentine Blomfield	Caius		Edward Law	St John's		Edward Valentine Blomfield	Caius	
1809	Edward Valentine Blomfield	Caius		John Lonsdale	King's		Edmund Henry Barker	Trinity	
1810 (Note: A second prize for Latin ode was awarded by the vice-chancellor to George Carleton Farhill in 1810.)	Edward Valentine Blomfield	Caius		Edward Valentine Blomfield	Caius		William Sheepshanks	Trinity	
1810	Edward Valentine Blomfield	Caius		George Carleton Farhill	King's		William Sheepshanks	Trinity	
1811	James Bailey	Trinity		George Waddington	Trinity		James Bailey	Trinity	
1812	John Tyas	Trinity		Marmaduke Lawson	St John's		Not awarded		
1813	Samuel Grove Price	Trinity		Samuel Grove Price	Trinity		Walter Stickland	Trinity	
1814	John Hutton Fisher	Trinity		John James Blunt	St John's		George Waddington	Trinity	
1815	John Hutton Fisher	Trinity		George Stainforth	Trinity		Not awarded		
1816	John Hutton Fisher	Trinity		William Nanson Lettsom	Trinity		William Nanson Lettsom	Trinity	
1817	George Stainforth	Trinity		William Nanson Lettsom	Trinity		George James Pennington	Trinity	
1818	Thomas Henry Hall	Trinity		Edward Harvey Maltby	Pembroke		Not awarded		
1819	Horatio Waddington	Trinity		Thomas Henry Hall	Trinity		Richard Okes	Trinity	
1820 (Note: In 1820, extra prizes were awarded to Henry Thompson (Latin ode) and Richard Okes (epigrams).)	Henry Nelson Coleridge	King's		Henry Nelson Coleridge	King's		Richard Okes	Trinity	
1820	Henry Nelson Coleridge	King's		Henry Thompson	St John's		Richard Okes	Trinity	
1821 (Note: In 1821, two extra prizes were awarded for epigrams.)	Henry Nelson Coleridge	King's		Charles Fursdon	Trinity		Edward Baines	Christ's	
1821	Henry Nelson Coleridge	King's		Charles Fursdon	Trinity		John Collyer	Clare	
1821	Henry Nelson Coleridge	King's		Charles Fursdon	Trinity		Charles Newman Cutler	Trinity	
1822	Winthrop Mackworth Praed	Trinity		Not awarded			Winthrop Mackworth Praed	Trinity	
1823	Winthrop Mackworth Praed	Trinity		Not awarded (Note: Benjamin Hall Kennedy submitted a Latin ode for consideration. His submission was selected by the vice-chancellor but he was found ineligible, having made the submission while still a pupil of Shrewsbury School.)			John Wilder	King's	
1824	Benjamin Hall Kennedy	St John's		Benjamin Hall Kennedy	St John's		Winthrop Mackworth Praed	Trinity	
1825	William Selwyn	St John's		Robert Snow	St John's		Benjamin Hall Kennedy	St John's	
1826	William Selwyn	St John's		William Selwyn	St John's		William Selwyn	St John's	
1827	William Selwyn	St John's		Christopher Wordsworth	Trinity		Christopher Wordsworth	Trinity	
1828	Frederick Tennyson	St John's		Christopher Wordsworth	Trinity		Christopher Wordsworth	Trinity	
1829	Charles Rann Kennedy	Trinity		Charles Merivale	St John's		Charles Merivale	St John's	
1830	James Hildyard	Christ's		Charles Rann Kennedy	Trinity		William Fitzherbert	Queens'	
1831	James Hildyard	Christ's		James Hildyard	Christ's		James Hildyard	Christ's	
1832	James Hildyard	Christ's		James Hildyard	Christ's		William Nicholson	Christ's	
1833	Thomas Kynaston Selwyn	Trinity		Henry Drury	Caius		Charles Clayton	Caius	
1834	Charles Clayton	Caius		Charles Stuart Savile	Queens'		James Ind Smith	Trinity	
1835	James Ind Smith	Trinity		Henry Drury	Caius		Henry Drury	Caius	
1836	Not awarded						Thomas Whytehead	St John's	
1837	Charles John Vaughan	Trinity		Philip Freeman	Trinity		Charles John Vaughan	Trinity	
1838	Not awarded			Edward Balston	King's		Philip Freeman	Trinity	
1839	Frederick Goulburn	Trinity		Edward Balston	King's		William Spicer Wood	St John's	
1840	Henry Mildred Birch	King's		Henry Mildred Birch	King's		Charles Sangster	St John's	
1841	Reginald Robert Walpole	Caius		Henry Mildred Birch	King's		Matthew Piers Watt Boulton	Trinity	
1842	William George Clark	Trinity		Henry James Sumner Maine	Pembroke		William George Clark	Trinity	
1843	William George Clark	Trinity		Henry James Sumner Maine	Pembroke		Henry James Sumner Maine	Pembroke	
1844	Henry Newport	Pembroke		Henry Newport	Pembroke		James George Fussell	Trinity	
1845	Henry de Winton	Trinity		James Camper Wright	King's		Charles James Monk	Trinity	
1846	Brooke Foss Westcott	Trinity		James Camper Wright	King's		Augustus Arthur Vansittart	Trinity	
1847	Brooke Foss Westcott	Trinity		David James Vaughan	Trinity		David James Vaughan	Trinity	
1848	Charles Schreiber	Trinity		Woodthorpe Scholefield Collett	Clare		Henry Carr Archdale Tayler	Trinity	
1849	John Daniel Williams	Trinity		D'Arcy Wentworth Thompson	Trinity		John Daniel Williams	Trinity	
1850	Philip Perring	Trinity		William Raynes	Clare		William Wayte	King's	
1851	Francis Vaughan Hawkins	Trinity		Francis Vaughan Hawkins	Trinity		Not awarded		
1852 (Note: In 1852, an additional prize was awarded to Joseph Foxley for epigrams.)	Francis Vaughan Hawkins	Trinity		Not awarded			William Charles Green	King's	
1852	Francis Vaughan Hawkins	Trinity		Not awarded			Joseph Foxley	St John's	
1853	Henry Montagu Butler	Trinity		Not awarded			William Charles Green	King's	
1854	Henry Montagu Butler	Trinity		Frederick Whitting	King's		William Charles Green	King's	
1855	Charles Stuart Calverley	Christ's		Not awarded			Herbert J. Reynolds	King's	
1856	Charles Stanwell	St John's		Herbert Snow	St John's		Edwin Charles Clark	Trinity	
1857	Arthur Holmes	St John's		Charles Stanwell	St John's		Robert Chapman Whiting	Trinity	

=== 1858–1910 ===
In 1858, the Epigrams medal was split into two awards, with one medal being awarded for the best Latin epigram and the other medal being awarded for the best Greek epigram.

List of recipients
Year	Greek ode			Latin ode			Greek epigram			Latin epigram		
Year	Recipient	College	Ref.	Recipient	College	Ref.	Recipient	College	Ref.	Recipient	College	Ref.
1858	Arthur Holmes	St John's		Not awarded			Henry Sidgwick (Note: Half-weight medal.)	Trinity		George Trevelyan	Trinity	
1859	Not awarded			Edward Compton Austen Leigh	King's		Not awarded			George Trevelyan	Trinity	
1860	Francis Warre-Cornish	King's		Edward Mallet Young	Trinity		Henry Yates Thompson	Trinity		Smith Churchill	St John's	
1861	Arthur Sidgwick	Trinity		Augustus Austen Leigh	King's		Henry Yates Thompson (Note: Awarded the original, full-weight medal for epigrams, rather than two half-weight medals, having won both the Greek and Latin epigram competitions.)				Trinity	
1862	Arthur Sidgwick	Trinity		William Austen Leigh	King's		Henry Lee-Warner	St John's		Not awarded		
1863	Henry Whitehead Moss	St John's		Handley Moule	Trinity		Handley Moule				Trinity	
1864	Alfred Edward Humphreys	Trinity		John Cole	King's		John Maxwell Image	Trinity		Bulkley Samuel Young	King's	
1865	John Sandys	St John's		Frederick Gunton	Magdalene		William Rann Kennedy				King's	
1866	James Heber Taylor	Trinity		Thomas Moss	St John's		Thomas Moss (Note: Thomas Moss's half-weight medal from 1866 sold at auction in 2018 for £800.)	St John's		Frederick Pollock	Trinity	
1867	George Hanley Hallam	St John's		George Hanley Hallam	St John's		William Rann Kennedy				King's	
1868	George Hanley Hallam	St John's		Tristram Frederick Croft Huddleston	King's		Tristram Frederick Croft Huddleston	King's		James Smith Reid	Christ's	
1869	Richard Dacre Hodgson	Trinity		Tristram Frederick Croft Huddleston	King's		Alfred Stilgoe Newman	Pembroke		Walter William Radcliffe	King's	
1870	Not awarded			Thomas Ethelbert Page	St John's		Charles Dixon	Caius		William Spicer Wood	St John's	
1871	Charles Dixon	Caius		Thomas Ethelbert Page	St John's		Francis Hay Rawlins	King's		Edward Branthwaite Moser	St John's	
1872	Francis Hay Rawlins	King's		Thomas Ethelbert Page	St John's		Edward Branthwaite Moser	St John's		Francis Hay Rawlins	King's	
1873	Francis Hay Rawlins	King's		Francis Hay Rawlins	King's		Francis Hay Rawlins	King's		Herold Arthur Perry	King's	
1874	Edward Carus Selwyn	King's		Not awarded			Henry Stephens Salt	King's		Edward Carus Selwyn	King's	
1875	James Welldon	King's		George William Douton	King's		Alfred Hands Cooke	King's		Edward Carus Selwyn	King's	
1876	James Welldon	King's		Edmund Whytehead Howson	King's		William Wallis English	St John's		Alfred Hands Cooke	King's	
1877	Alfred Hands Cooke	King's		Not awarded			Hercules Henry West	Trinity		Not awarded		
1878	Robert Parker	King's		Henry Charles Finch Mason	Trinity		Cooper Perry	King's		Thomas Wilson Dougan	St John's	
1879	John Cottam Moss	St John's		John Cottam Moss	St John's		John Cottam Moss	St John's		Thomas George Tucker	St John's	
1880	John Cottam Moss	St John's		John Cottam Moss	St John's		Thomas George Tucker	St John's		Harry Goodhart	Trinity	
1881	John Cottam Moss	St John's		John Cottam Moss	St John's		John Cottam Moss	St John's		Harold Comerford Clarkson	King's	
1882	William Ralph Inge	King's		William Ralph Inge	King's		William Ralph Inge	King's		Marcus Southwell Dimsdale	King's	
1883	Sidney Rowlatt	King's		Sidney Rowlatt	King's		Hugh Vibart Macnaghten	Trinity		Hugh Vibart Macnaghten	Trinity	
1884	Hugh Vibart Macnaghten	Trinity		Hugh Vibart Macnaghten	Trinity		Peter Giles	Caius		Henry Babington Smith	Trinity	
1885	Walter Headlam	King's		Walter Headlam	King's		Joseph Robinson Orford	King's		Henry Babington Smith	Trinity	
1886	Walter Headlam	King's		Walter Headlam	King's		Henry Babington Smith	Trinity		Harold Kennedy St John Sanderson	Trinity	
1887	Walter Headlam	King's		Walter Headlam	King's		Frederick William Thomas	Trinity		Walter Headlam	King's	
1888	No candidates						George Arthur Turner	Trinity		Walter William Skeat	Christ's	
1888	No candidates						George Arthur Turner	Trinity		Frederick William Thomas	Trinity	
1889	Frederick William Thomas	Trinity		Edward Ernest Sikes	St John's		Robert Gregg Bury	Trinity		Basil Wynne Willson	St John's	
1890	Frederick James Kittermaster	King's		Not awarded			Terrot R. Glover	St John's		Henry John Edwards	Trinity	
1891	Frederick James Kittermaster	King's		Herbert Mayo Leman	Magdalene		Terrot R. Glover	St John's		William Henry Jacques	Trinity	
1892	Cuthbert McEvoy	Christ's		John Herbert Stamp	Trinity		Cyril Wells	Trinity		Cyril Eustace Bousfield	Christ's	
1893	Lionel Barnett	Trinity		Allan Beville Ramsay	King's		Lionel Barnett	Trinity		Thomas Maris Taylor	Caius	
1894	Lionel Barnett	Trinity		Not awarded			Allan Beville Ramsay	King's		Edgar Iliff Robson	Christ's	
1895 (Note: Albert Darby Nightingale (Trinity) gained an honourable mention for his Latin epigram.)	Not awarded						Albert Evan Bernays	Trinity		Alfred Chotzner	St John's	
1896	Lionel Barnett	Trinity		Not awarded			Vere Bawtree Cobden-Samuel	Jesus		Percy Greeves	St John's	
1897	Austin Edward Arthur Watt Smyth	Trinity		Norman Charles Armitage	Trinity		Alexander William Mair	Caius		Norman Charles Armitage	Trinity	
1898	Trevor Griffith Johnson	Jesus		Norman Charles Armitage	Trinity		James Toplis	Trinity		Not awarded		
1899	Trevor Griffith Johnson	Jesus		Not awarded			Russell Kerr Gaye	Trinity		Ernest Harrison	Trinity	
1900	Not awarded						George Dean Raffles Tucker	Magdalene		George Dean Raffles Tucker	Magdalene	
1901	Trevor Griffith Johnson	Jesus		Not awarded						Frederick William Hasluck	King's	
1902	Cecil Goodden	King's		Not awarded			William Blair Anderson	Trinity		Not awarded		
1903	Hugh Sydenham Vere Hodge	Trinity		Oliffe Legh Richmond	King's		Kenneth John Freeman	Trinity		Not awarded		
1904	Robert Quirk	King's		No candidates			Robert Quirk	King's		John Fraser	Trinity	
1905	Robert Allason Furness	King's		Roy Meldrum	St John's		John Fraser	Trinity		George C. Brooke	Corpus Christi	
1906	Gordon Selwyn	King's		Not awarded			Thomas Edward Ainger	King's		Alfred Dillwyn Knox	King's	
1907	No candidates			Andrew Sydenham Farrar Gow	Trinity		John Douglas Barnard	Jesus		John Douglas Barnard	Jesus	
1908	Andrew Sydenham Farrar Gow	Trinity		James Ramsay Montagu Butler	Trinity		Andrew Sydenham Farrar Gow	Trinity		Geoffrey Grant Morris	Trinity	
1909	James Ramsay Montagu Butler	Trinity		No candidates			Geoffrey Grant Morris	Trinity		Geoffrey Grant Morris	Trinity	
1910	James Ramsay Montagu Butler	Trinity		No candidates			Francis Winstanley Haskins	Trinity		Francis Winstanley Haskins	Trinity	

=== 1911–present ===
List of recipients
Year	Recipient	College	Awarded for	Ref.
1911	Bernard Adams	St John's	Latin ode Greek epigram	
1912	Bernard Adams	St John's	Greek epigram	
1912	Christopher Llewellyn Bullock	Trinity	Latin ode	
1913	Christopher Bullock	Trinity	Latin ode Greek epigram	
1914	Christopher Bullock	Trinity	Latin epigram	
1920	Frank Lawrence Lucas	King's	Latin ode	
c. 1931	John Manuel Cook	King's	Greek ode	
1932	Enoch Powell	Trinity	Greek epigram	
1945	Eric Handley	Trinity		
1961	Colin François Lloyd Austin	Jesus		
1973	J. C. McKeown	Queens'	Greek ode Latin ode	
1974	J. C. McKeown	Queens'	Greek ode Latin ode Latin epigram	
1978	Neil Hopkinson	Peterhouse	Greek ode Greek epigram Latin epigram	
1979	Neil Hopkinson	Peterhouse	Greek ode Latin ode Greek epigram Latin epigram	
1983	R. G. Gardiner			
1992	N. J. G. Lane	Trinity		
1993	N. J. G. Lane	Trinity		
1995	Kwasi Kwarteng	Trinity	Greek ode Latin ode Latin epigram	
1995	Kwasi Kwarteng	Trinity	Greek ode Latin ode Latin epigram	
1996	Kwasi Kwarteng	Trinity	Latin ode	
1996	M. O. McCullagh	Trinity	Greek ode Latin epigram	
1997	M. O. McCullagh	Trinity	Greek ode Latin ode Latin epigram	
1998	R. A. Kennedy	Downing	Latin ode Latin epigram	
1998	No candidates		Greek ode Greek epigram	
1999	No candidates		Greek ode Latin ode Greek epigram	
1999	Not awarded		Latin epigram	
2000	No candidates		Greek ode Latin ode Greek epigram Latin epigram	
2001	H. A. Van Noorden	Trinity	Greek epigram	
2001	Not awarded		Latin ode Latin epigram	
2001	No candidates		Greek ode	
2003	J. M. Morhart			
2005	D. J. Butterfield	Christ's	Greek ode Latin ode Greek epigram Latin epigram	
2006	D. J. Butterfield	Christ's	Greek ode Latin ode Greek epigram	
2008	Thomas Ford	Downing	Latin ode	
2012	D. A. Fisher	Murry Edwards		
2012	W. A. Winning			
2014	W. A. Winning			
2015	Alexander Hardwick	Queens'	Latin epigram	
2017	N. C. A. Hess		Latin ode Latin epigram	
2019	S. Tyrrall			
2019	B. McDougall			
2020	M. A. Hardy			
2021	T. Hurst			
2022	T. Hurst			
2025	M. Woodward			
2026	Jack Hitchcock	Girton	Latin epigram	

== See also ==
- Bowdoin Prizes at Harvard University
