= Porson Prize =

Award for Greek verse composition at the University of Cambridge

The Porson Prize is an undergraduate award for Greek verse composition at the University of Cambridge. It was founded in honor of classical scholar Richard Porson and was first awarded in 1817. Winners are known as "Porson prizemen".

== Winners of the Porson Prize ==
- 1817: George James Pennington (King's) for 2 Henry IV 3.1.
- 1818: William Sidney Walker (Trinity) for Henry VIII 3.2.
- 1819: Horatio Waddington (Trinity) for Coriolanus 5.3.
- 1820: William Henry Fox Talbot (Trinity) for Macbeth 1.7.
- 1821: William Foster Barham (Trinity) for Othello 1.3.
- 1822: William Foster Barham (Trinity) for Julius Cæsar 4.3.
  - Second prize: C. Wimberly (St. John's).
- 1823: Benjamin Hall Kennedy (St. John's) for Henry VIII 5.4.
- 1824: Benjamin Hall Kennedy (St. John's) for Merchant of Venice 4.1.
- 1825: John Hodgson (Trinity) for King John 4.2.
- 1826: Benjamin Hall Kennedy (Trinity) for King John 3.3.
  - Second prize: John Wordsworth (Trinity).
- 1827: John Wordsworth (Trinity) for As You Like It 2.2.
- 1828: Christopher Wordsworth (Trinity) for Troilus and Cressida 3.3.
- 1829: Charles Rann Kennedy (Trinity) for Henry VIII 4.2.
- 1830: Charles Rann Kennedy (Trinity) for Romeo and Juliet 2.2.
- 1831: George John Kennedy (St. John's) for As You Like It 2.1.
- 1832: Henry Lushington (Trinity) for Julius Cæsar 2.2.
- 1833: Henry Lushington (Trinity) for Richard II 3.2.
- 1834: Edward Howes (Trinity) for Richard II 3.2.
- 1835: William James Kennedy (St. John's) for 3 Henry VI 2.2.
- 1836: Charles John Vaughan (Trinity) for Richard II 2.1.
- 1837: Charles John Vaughan (Trinity) for King Lear 3.2.
- 1838: Thomas Evans (St. John's) for Henry V Act 4.
- 1839: Edward Meredith Cope (Trinity) for 3 Henry VI 2.5.
- 1840: Robert Andrews (Pembroke) for Troilus and Cressida 1.3.
- 1841: George Druce (Peterhouse) for The Tempest 4.1.
- 1842: George Druce (Peterhouse) for Henry V 4.1.
- 1843: William George Clark (Trinity) for Midsummer Night's Dream 4.1.
- 1844: Edward Thring (King's) for 2 Henry IV 2.4.
- 1845: Thomas Markby (Trinity) for Hamlet 1.3.
- 1846: George James Gill (Emmanuel) for Julius Cæsar 1.2.
- 1847: George James Gill (Emmanuel) for Henry V 1.2.
- 1848: Edward Henry Perowne (Corpus) for Hamlet 1.2.
- 1849: Francis Kewley (St. John's) for Julius Cæsar 1.1.
- 1850: William Owen (St. John's) for Merchant of Venice 5.1.
- 1851: George Bentley Morley (St. John's) for 2 Henry IV 4.4.
- 1852: Samuel Hawksley Burbury (St. John's) for Macbeth 1.7.
- 1853: Samuel Hawksley Burbury (St. John's) for Jonson's The New Inn 4.3.
- 1854: Henry Montagu Butler (Trinity) for Jonson's Volpone 3.1.
- 1855: Edward Lawford Brown (Trinity) for Beaumont and Fletcher's Bonduca 3.2.
- 1856: Arthur Holmes (St. John's) for 3 Henry IV 1.4.
- 1857: Arthur Holmes (St. John's) for All's Well That Ends Well 1.2.
- 1858: Arthur Holmes (St. John's) for Measure for Measure 2.3.
- 1859: Awarded both Richard Claverhouse Jebb (Trinity) and to Robert Chapman Whiting (Trinity) æqualiter for Julius Cæsar 5.1.
- 1860: Henry Yates Thompson (Trinity) for Dekker and Massinger's Virgin Martyr 4.3.
- 1861: Awarded both Charles Edward Graves (St. John's) and to Henry Whitehead Moss (St. John's) æq. for 2 Henry IV 2.3.
- 1862: Henry Whitehead Moss (St. John's) for Taming of the Shrew 5.2.
- 1863: Henry Whitehead Moss (St. John's) for Twelfth Night 5.2.
- 1864: Thomas William Brogden (St. John's) for Richard II 5.2.
- 1865: John Edwin Sandys (St. John's) for Macbeth 3.2.
- 1866: John Edwin Sandys (St. John's) for Measure for Measure 3.1.
- 1867: Thomas Moss (St. John's) for The Tempest 1.2.
- 1868: George Charles Winter Warr (Trinity) for Jonson's Catiline 5.6.
- 1869: Richard Dacre Hodgson (Archer-Hind) (Trinity) for 1 Henry VI 4.5.
- 1870: Awarded both Edmund Gurney (Trinity) and to Thomas Ethelbert Page (St. John's) æq. for 2 Henry IV 1.1.
- 1871: Henry Rees Philipps (Non-Collegiate) for 1 Henry IV 3.2.
- 1872: Henry Rees Philipps (Non-Collegiate) for Two Gentlemen of Verona 2.7.
- 1873: Henry Wace (St. John's) for Massinger's Maid of Honour 1.1.
- 1874: Henry Wace (St. John's) for Fletcher's The Bloody Brother 4.1.
- 1875: Awarded both John Archibald Sharkey (Christ's) and to Henry Wace (St. John's) for Midsummer Night's Dream 3.2.
- 1876: Awarded both George Chawner (King's) and to Harry Rede Tottenham (Trinity).
- 1877: Arthur Frederick Chance (Trinity).
- 1878: Henry Charles Finch Mason (Trinity) for Macbeth 2.1.
- 1879: Arthur Frederick Chance (Trinity).
- 1880: Awarded both Cecil Hill Garland (St. John's) and to William Ralph Inge (King's).
- 1881: James Duff Duff [sic] (Trinity).
- 1882: Owen Seaman (Clare).
- 1883: Sidney Arthur Taylor Rowlatt (King's).
- 1884: William Longbourne Smith (St. John's).
- 1885: Awarded both Joseph Robinson Orford (King's) and to Norman Kenneth Stephen (Trinity).
- 1886: Norman Kenneth Stephen (Trinity).
- 1887: Walter George Headlam (King's).
- 1888: Awarded both John Patrick Murray Blaekett (St. John's) and to Reynold Alleyne Nicholson (Trinity).
  - Honourably mentioned: A.R.F. Hyslop (King's).
- 1889: John Patrick Murray Blaekett (St. John's).
  - Honourably mentioned: G.A. Davies (Trinity) and T.R. Glover (St. John's).
- 1890: Reynold Alleyne Nicholson (Trinity).
  - Proxime accessit ("or nearly equal to successful Candidate"): F.J. Kittermaster (King's).
- 1891: Terrot Reaveley Glover (St. John's).
  - Honourably mentioned: W.H. Jacques (Trinity) and F.J. Kittermaster (King's).
- 1892: Isaac Frank Smedley (Pembroke).
- 1893: Henry William Monle (Corpus).
  - Honourably mentioned: L. Horton-Smith (St. John's) and J.D.C. White (Trinity).
- 1894: Albert Darby Nightingale (Trinity).
  - Honourably mentioned: H.S.S. Parker (Corpus) and J.D.C. White (Trinity).
- 1895: Albert Darby Nightingale (Trinity).
  - Honourably mentioned: H.F. Moule (Clare).
- 1896: Not awarded.
- 1897: Not awarded.
- 1898: John Hubert Marshall (King's).
- 1899: John Edwin Clapham Jukes (Pembroke).
  - Honourably mentioned: R.K. Gaye (Trinity).
- 1900: Russell Kerr Gaye (Trinity).
- 1901: Gilbert Norwood (St. John's).
  - Proxime accessit: A.S. Gaye (Trinity).
- 1902: John Tresidder Sheppard (King's) for Troilus and Cressida 4.5.
  - Honourably mentioned: B.H.Dobson (Emmanuel).
- 1903: Gilbert Norwood (St. John's).
  - Honourably mentioned: B.H. Dobson (Emmanuel) and W.B. Anderson (Trinity).
- 1904: Thomas Irving Ward Wilson (King's).
- 1905: Edward Gordon Selwyn (King's).
- 1906: Awarded both Stuart Kelson Brown (King's) and to Andrew Sydenham Farrar Gow (Trinity).
- 1907: Andrew Sydenham Farrar Gow (Trinity).
  - Proxime accessit: D.S. Robertson (Trinity).
- 1908: Charles Ambrose Storey (Trinity).
  - Honourably mentioned: A.S.F. Gow (Trinity).
- 1909: Francis Winstanley Haskins (Trinity).
  - Proxime accessit: J.R.M. Butler (Trinity).
- 1910: James Ramsay Montagu Butler (Trinity).
- 1911: Francis Winstanley Haskins (Trinity).
  - Honourably mentioned: W.B. Chope (Peterhouse).
- 1912: Gordon Kerr Montagu Butler (Trinity).
  - Honourably mentioned: E.O.Lee (King's).
- 1913: Edward Owen Lee (King's).
- 1914: Frank Laurence Lucas (Trinity).
  - Honourably mentioned: J.O. Thomson (Trinity).
- 1915: Edward Hallett Carr (Trinity).
- 1916: Not awarded.
- 1917: Not awarded.
- 1918: Not awarded.
- 1919: Not awarded.
- 1920: Victor Joseph Dunstan (Pembroke).
  - Honourably mentioned: B. C .C. Olivier (King's) and E. H. Warmington (Peterhouse).
- 1921: Joseph Vivian Wilson (Trinity).
  - Proxime accessit: P. W. Duff (Trinity) and B. C. C. Olivier (King's).
  - Honourably mentioned: A. D. Nock (Trinity).
- 1922: William Smart Wright (King's).
  - Proxime accessit: William le B. Egerton (Trinity).
  - Honourably mentioned: P. W. Duff (Trinity) and J. H. N. Lawson (Pembroke).
- 1923: Desmond Francis Haslett Macbride (King's) and Eric Cecil Prussia (King's), aeq.
  - Proxime accessit: William le B. Egerton (Trinity) and H. S. Kenward (King's), aeq.
- 1924: Einar Athelstan Gordon Caroe (Trinity).
  - Proxime accessit: E. C. Prussia (King's).
- 1925: David Edward Eichholz (Emmanuel).
  - Honourably mentioned: W. H. J. Christie (King's) and K. W. Luckhurst (Emmanuel).
- 1926: Pierson John Dixon (Pembroke).
  - Proxime accessit: W. E. Philip (King's).
- 1927: William Elmslie Philip (King's).
  - Honourably mentioned: P. H. Vellacott (Magdalene).
- 1928: Walter Hamilton (Trinity)
  - Proxime accessit: P. H. Vellacott (Magdalene).
- 1929: Walter Hamilton (Trinity).
  - Honourably mentioned: S. Chapman (Trinity), L. H. M. Gulland (Peterhouse) and D. E. W. Wormell (St. John's).
- 1930: Francis Anthony Kendrick (Trinity).
  - Proxime accessit: John Hensley (Trinity).
  - Honourably mentioned: Frederick Willoughby Allen (Trinity) and William Lethbridge Gorell Barnes.
- 1931: J. Hensley (Trinity)
- 1932: John Enoch Powell (Trinity).
- 1933: Frederick William Clayton (King's).
- 1934: Leonard Abraham Jones (Christ's).
  - Honorably mentioned: Richard Portway Dobson (King's).
- 1935: W. A. Edward (Clare) and F. H. Stubbings (Emmanuel) aeq.
- 1936: M. Grant (Trinity).
- 1937: George Mervyn Lee (Trinity).
- 1938: A. Mayor (Trinity).
  - Honorably mentioned: G. Ellenbogen (King's).
- 1939: C. J. Wiles (Christ's).
  - Proxime accessit: H. V. Brandon (King's).
- 1942: David Mervyn Jones (Trinity).
- 1947: Edward Albert Vincent (Trinity).
- 1948: M. D. Macleod (Pembroke).
  - Honorably mentioned: Maurice Pope (Magdalene).
- 1949: Charles Garton (King's).
- 1950: M. M. Willcock (Pembroke).
- 1951: W. G. Arnott (Pembroke).
- 1952: W. G. Arnott (Pembroke).
- 1953: W. B. Cook (Trinity).
- 1954: D.F. Snook (Trinity).
- 1955: Roger David Dawe (Gonville and Caius).
- 1956: Roger David Dawe (Gonville and Caius).
- 1958: J. A. Weir (Trinity).
- 1960: Colin Peter Sydenham (King's) for Arnold's Merope 1904-1965.
- 1961: David Blackman (Trinity).
- 1962: Colin François Lloyd Austin (Jesus).
- 1965: James Diggle (St. John's).
  - Proxime accessit ("or nearly equal to successful Candidate"): D. M. Forrester (King's).
- 1970: Richard G. A. Buxton (King's) for Richard II 3.2.
- 1971: Mrs Bernadette Taylor (Girton).
- 1972: J. C. McKeown (Queens').
- 1973: J. C. McKeown (Queens').
- 1974: J. C. McKeown (Queens').
- 1976: Giovanni Remo Franceso Ferrari (King's) and James Frederick Warren (Jesus) aeq.
  - Honorably mentioned: Adrian Merlin Daniels (Trinity).
- 1977: James Frederick Warren (Jesus).
- 1979: D. G. McFarland (Queens').
- 1980: D. G. McFarland (Queens').
- 1983: Jon H. V. Robinson (Girton).
- 1986: Gareth D. Williams (Trinity)
- 1992: N. J. G. Lane (Trinity).
- 1993: N. J. G. Lane (Trinity).
- 1994: N. J. G. Lane (Trinity).
- 1996: Matthew Oliver McCullagh (Trinity).
- 1998: C. C. F. Barker (Trinity).
- 2000: G. M. Lee (Trinity).
- 2008: Thomas Ford (Downing)
- 2016: N. C. A. Hess (Trinity).
- 2017: N. C. A. Hess (Trinity).
- 2020: M. Sargent (Trinity) and M. A. Hardy (Girton) aeq.
- 2021: Sebastian James Tyrrall (Jesus).
- 2025: Max Woodward (Jesus).

== See also ==
- The Gaisford Prize at Oxford.
- The Bowdoin Prize at Harvard.
- The Browne medals at Cambridge.
- List of British literary awards
- List of poetry awards

== Sources ==
- Tanner, Joseph Robinson. The Historical Register of the University of Cambridge. Cambridge: CUP, 1917. Page 317.
- The Historical Register of the University of Cambridge: Supplement, 1911-20. Cambridge: CUP, 1922 (no author given). Page 45.
- Translations Which Have Obtained the Porson Prize in the University of Cambridge from the Year 1817. Cambridge: Johnson, 1871 (no author given).
