= Herbert Reynolds =

Herbert Reynolds may refer to:

- Herbert Reynolds (lyricist) (1867–1933), Irish-American lyricist
- Herbert H. Reynolds (1930–2007, president of Baylor University
- Herbert J. Reynolds (1832–1916), member of the Indian Civil Service and the Legislative Council of Bengal

== See also ==
- Herbert F. Raynolds (1874/75–1950), Justice of the New Mexico Supreme Court
