= Royal Commission on Capital Punishment 1864–1866 =

British royal commission

The Royal Commission on Capital Punishment was a royal commission on capital punishment in the United Kingdom which worked from 1864 to 1866. It was chaired by Charles Gordon-Lennox, 6th Duke of Richmond. Commissioners disagreed on the question of abolition of capital punishment, but their report's recommendations including abolishing public execution, which was effected by the Capital Punishment Amendment Act 1868.

== Appointment ==
The Government agreed to a Royal Commission on 3 May 1864. In the House of Commons, William Ewart proposed a select committee, but withdrew in favour of Charles Neate's resolution requesting a Royal Commission.

The commission was formally appointed by Queen Victoria on 8 July 1864. Its terms of reference were:

to inquire into the Provisions and Operation of the Laws now in force in the United Kingdom, under and by virtue of which the Punishment of Death may be inflicted upon persons convicted of certain crimes, and also into the manner in which Capital Sentences are carried into execution, and to report whether any, and if any what alteration is desirable in such Laws, or any of them, or in the manner in which such sentences are carried into execution.

The commissioners were:

Charles Gordon-Lennox, 6th Duke of Richmond	Chairman
Edward, Lord Stanley	later the 15th Earl of Derby
Stephen Lushington	judge
John Taylor Coleridge	judge
Thomas O'Hagan	Lord Chancellor of Ireland
James Moncrieff	Lord Advocate for Scotland
Horatio Waddington	Under Secretary of State for the Home Department
John Bright	MP
William Ewart	MP
Gathorne Hardy	MP
George Ward Hunt	MP
Charles Neate	MP

Secretary to the commission was James Henry Patteson

== Evidence ==
The Commission took oral evidence on 15 days, between 29 November 1864 and 25 March 1865, dealing with three or four witnesses a day.

George Denman	QC and MP
Edmund Henderson	Comptroller General of Convicts in Western Australia
Thomas Kittle	Policeman
Richard Tanner	Policeman
Sir Fitzroy Kelly	MP
John Davis	chaplain of Newgate Prison
William Tallack	Hon. Secretary of the Society for the Abolition of the Punishment of Death
Vere Hobart, Lord Hobart	Peer and administrator
Sir George Grey	Home Secretary
Hilary Nicholas Nissen	Former Sheriff of the City of London
Henry Avory	Clerk of Arraigns at the Central Criminal Court (Old Bailey)
Leone Levi	Jurist and statistician
James Fitzjames Stephen	Lawyer
Sir James Shaw Willes	Court of Common Pleas justice
John Jessop	Horsemonger Lane Gaol chaplain
Thomas Beggs	Hon. Secretary of the Society for the Abolition of the Punishment of Death
Thomas Harrington Tuke	Association of Medical Officers of asylums
John Humffreys Parry	Serjeant at law
Henry Cartwright	Governor of Gloucester Prison
Sir Lawrence Peel	Former Chief Justice of Bengal
William Charles Hood	Asylum visitor
James Anthony Lawson	Attorney General for Ireland
William Morrish	Governor of Portland Prison
Émile Chedieu	French lawyer
Sydney Godolphin Osborne	Cleric and philanthropist
George Young	Solicitor General for Scotland
Henry Stace	Former Governor of Oxford Gaol
William Cook Osborne	Chaplain at Bath Gaol
Walter Crofton	Prison administrator and penal reformer
Auguste Visschers	Belgian lawyer; chair of the 1848 International Peace Congress in Brussels
Sir Mordaunt Wells	Former judge in Bengal

== Questionnaire ==
Written questions were sent by the Commission via the Foreign Office to foreign law officers and experts:

1. What crimes, if any, are now punishable with death by the law of . . . . . ?
2. When a person is found guilty of a capital offence, is there any power in the jury, or the court, to reduce the punishment below that of death by finding attenuating circumstances ? If so, is this power frequently exercised?
3. What is the most severe punishment next to that of death by the law of . . . . ? and in cases where the sentence of death is reduced by the finding of attenuating circumstances, or commuted by the government to such lesser punishment, is the latter invariably carried out in full ? If not, to what extent is it mitigated ?
4. Have there been any changes of late years in the law of . . . . . by which certain crimes formerly capital have ceased to be so ? If so, have these crimes increased, and is their increase, if any, attributed to the diminution of the punishment ?
5. In what manner is the sentence of death executed, and does the execution take place in public or private ?
6. In what proportion of capital convictions is the punishment of death usually reduced by the clemency of the Head of the State to some minor infliction?

Sent France, Belgium, Holland, Prussia, Bavaria, Austria, Saxony, Hanover, Italy, Tuscany, Spain, Portugal, Russia, Switzerland, Denmark, Sweden, Nassau, Anhalt, Oldenberg, Brunswick, New York, Pennsylvania, Massachusetts, Ohio, Maine and Rhode Island, Columbia, Indiana, Venezuela, Wisconsin, Ecuador, the Australian colonies, Scotland, Ireland

== Report ==
The Report of the commission was published in December 1865. The report proper summarised the evidence and gave the commissioners' recommendations. The oral testimony was printed verbatim over 471 pages; the written responses were gathered into an appendix of 195 pages plus an index. There followed statistical tables and a Draft Bill on infanticide by James Shaw Willes.

In their report, they included a section summarising the response to the following questions:

- the nature of capital punishment; its difference from all other punishments in its irrevocability, etc.
- deterrent effect of the punishment of death
- the Home Office
- restoring to the judges the power of recording sentence of death
- whether juries show a reluctance to convict in capital cases
- the propriety of giving power to jurors to bring in verdicts of "guilty of murder" with "extenuating circumstances" in certain cases
- infanticide
- allowing appeals in capital cases
- whether executions should be public or private
- what secondary punishment should be inflicted in the event of the abolition of the punishment of death

=== Recommendations ===
The Commission did not come to agreement on abolition. On most matters, it offered a range of options for legislation. The exception was unanimity of the need for a law to stop public executions and to regulate executions within prisons.

A declaration, drafted by Stephen Lushington, was included in the Report: "[We] . . . are not prepared to agree to the Resolution respecting private executions." Signed by Stephen Lushington, Wm Ewart, Charles Neate, J Moncreiff, John Bright. This is presumably because they strongly favoured abolition.

William Ewart, Stephen Lushington, John Bright and Charles Neate signed a declaration drafted by Ewart: "[we]. . . are of opinion that Capital Punishment might, safely, and with advantage to the community, be at once abolished."

O'Hagan made a longer declaration: "I am of opinion,—with much deference for the great authority of those who think otherwise,—that the weight of evidence and reason is in favour of the abolition of Capital Punishment.

"I should, therefore, sign the declaration prepared by Mr. Ewart, but that I doubt whether public opinion in this country is yet ripe for the acceptance of such a change; and if it should be accomplished, without the sufficient sanction of that opinion, I fear the reaction which might follow on the perpetration of some great crime. I think, also, that the substitution of a minor penalty would render essential serious modifications in the discipline and machinery of our prisons; and such modifications, whilst I believe them to be possible, may be difficult, and remain to be devised. On these grounds, having regard to the practical scope of Your Majesty's Commission, I cannot join in simply advising immediate abolition; but, so far qualifying my adhesion to the terms of the declaration, I am prepared to adopt the principle which it embodies."

== See also ==
- Capital punishment in the United Kingdom
