= Lionel Barnett =

English orientalist (1871–1960)

Professor Lionel Barnett CB FBA
- Barnett in 1937
- Born: Lionel David Barnett; 21 October 1871; Liverpool, England
- Died: 28 January 1960 (aged 88)
- Occupation: Orientalist

Lionel David Barnett CB FBA (21 October 1871 – 28 January 1960) was an English orientalist.

The son of a Liverpool banker, Barnett was educated at Liverpool High School, Liverpool Institute, University College, Liverpool and Trinity College, Cambridge, where he took a first class degree in classics and was three times a winner of a Browne medal.

In 1899, he joined the British Museum as Assistant Keeper in the Department of Oriental Printed Books and Manuscripts. In 1908 he became Keeper, remaining in the post until his retirement in 1936. He was also Professor of Sanskrit at University College, London from 1906 to 1917, founding Lecturer in Sanskrit at the School of Oriental Studies (1917–1948), Lecturer in Ancient Indian History and Epigraphy (1922–1948), and Librarian of the School (1940–1947). In 1948, at the age of 77, he rejoined the British Museum, which was desperately short of staff, as an Assistant Keeper, remaining there until his death.

In 1932, Barnett became entirely blind in one eye and retained only partial vision in the other.

He was made a Companion of the Order of the Bath (CB) in 1937.
