= T. F. C. Huddleston =

Tristram Frederick Croft Huddleston (23 January 1848 – 26 February 1936) was a British classicist at King's College, Cambridge.

Huddleston was educated at Eton College and King's College, Cambridge. As a student he received the Powis Medal and the Browne medal. He was Classical Lecturer, 1871-5 and Bursar, 1872-80.

He married in 1879 Bessie, daughter of Rev. J. Chataway, Rector of Rotherwick, Hants. As was customary at Cambridge at the time, he had to resign his fellowship as a result. Their son was Sir Arthur Huddleston.

He was Censor of Fitzwilliam House from 1890 to 1907.
