= Swynfen will case =

UK legal case

Swynfen Will Case
- Full case name: Samuel Swynfen

Case history
- Related action: Wills

Keywords
- Equity law

The Swynfen (or Swinfen) will case was a series of English trials over the will of Samuel Swynfen that ran from 1856 to 1864 and raised important questions of ethics in the legal profession.

== The case ==
Samuel Swynfen of Swinfen Hall, Staffordshire died in 1854 and, in his will, left £60,000 (around £6 million in present-day terms) to his widowed daughter-in-law Patience Swynfen. But Samuel possessed another large estate that was not mentioned in his will. Patience claimed that too.

However, Frederick Hay Swynfen, Samuel's nephew, also claimed the estate. Litigation followed with eminent barristers Sir Frederick Thesiger representing Patience and Sir Alexander Cockburn the nephew. Contrary to Patience's instructions, Thesiger negotiated a settlement with Cockburn and put it to the judge. Patience was furious and succeeded in having the agreement set aside and a new trial listed. Dismissing Thesiger, Patience instructed a young and little known barrister named Charles Rann Kennedy, promising to pay him £20,000 (around £1.9 million in present-day terms) if he succeeded in her cause.

Spurred by the incentive and the fact that he was engaged in a sexual relationship with Patience, Kennedy won the estate. However, she went on to marry a Charles Broun and then to declare that she had no intention of paying Kennedy.

Kennedy sued and won, but his claim was overturned on appeal on the grounds that his contingency fee agreement under another name offended ancient prohibitions on champerty and maintenance. In the case of Kennedy v. Broun, Sir William Erle CJ held that the relationship between client and barrister was not a contract. Patience now sued Thesiger over his original professional misconduct. Further, she alleged that Sir Cresswell Cresswell, the judge in the original trial, had induced Thesiger's agreement to a settlement by suggesting that he had formed an unfavourable opinion of Patience's case. Her claim was unsuccessful.

== Bibliography ==
- Kingston, C. (1923). Famous Judges and Famous Trials. London: Stanley Paul & Co. pp. pp167–168. ISBN 0-8377-2336-1.
- Pue, W. W. (1990). "Moral panic at the English Bar: Paternal vs. commercial ideologies of legal practice in the 1860s". Law and Social Inquiry. 15 (1): 49–118. doi:10.1111/j.1747-4469.1990.tb00275.x. S2CID 145788677.
