= Christopher Stead =

British theologian

The Revd George Christopher Stead (9 April 1913 – 28 May 2008) was a British patristic scholar and Church of England clergyman who was the last Ely Professor of Divinity at the University of Cambridge. He is best known for his work on the philosophy of the Church Fathers. He studied under G.E. Moore and Ludwig Wittgenstein while an undergraduate at Cambridge. His academic career was combined with ministry as a college chaplain and then residentiary Canon of the Ely Cathedral; he also served briefly as Curate of St. John's, Newcastle upon Tyne in 1939.

== Biography ==
Stead was born on 9 April 1913 in Wimbledon, London, England. His initial education took place at two prep schools: King's College Junior School in Wimbledon, and the Dragon School in Oxford. He was then educated as Marlborough College, then an all-boys public school (i.e. independent boarding school).

He won a scholarship to King's College, Cambridge, where he studied classics and moral science (i.e. philosophy). He achieved the highest marks in his year in Part I of the Classical Tripos. In 1934, his second year at university, he was made Pitt Scholar, the pre-eminent scholarship for classics at the University of Cambridge. His tutor was R. B. Braithwaite, and he attended philosophy lectures by Ludwig Wittgenstein and G. E. Moore. He graduated with a first class honours Bachelor of Arts (BA) in 1935.

During his undergraduate degree, Stead had "doubts about Christian belief", but was still active in attending the college chapel and praying. He was friends with Eric Milner-White, a High Churchman, and with other members of the Anglo-Catholic Oratory of the Good Shepherd.

After Cambridge, Stead moved to the University of Oxford, where he undertook postgraduate studies in philosophy and theology. He completed a dissertation on teleology in Kant's Critique of Judgement. He had applied for a fellowship at his alma mater, but the candidates at King's College that year were especially brilliant, including Alan Turing. He was, however, elected a fellow the following year in 1938, and also made college lecturer in divinity.

Having felt drawn to Holy Orders, he trained for ordination at Cuddesdon Theological College, an Anglo-Catholic theological college near Oxford from 1937 to 1938.As a fellow of the University of Cambridge, he did not have to go through the usual selection process. He was ordained in the Church of England as a deacon December 1938 by Nugent Hicks, Bishop of Lincoln, in his role as visitor to King's College. He held permission to officiate in the Diocese of Newcastle from 1938 to 1939, during which he served a brief curacy at St John the Baptist Church, Newcastle upon Tyne. Around the start of the Second World War, he was in charge of evacuating the children of the urban parish to Seascale on the coast of Cumbria, including organising a collection of clogs for the unshod evacuees. He was due to be ordained as a priest in December 1939, but could not in good conscious support the conception of the Eucharist as transubstantiation that the parish believed; he described it as "pseudo-chemistry". So he left to return to his fellowship at King's College, Cambridge as a deacon.

King's College, Cambridge was founded as a sister institution Eton College, and Stead was appointed to the all-boys school as a classics assistant master in 1940. Within a more relaxed Anglican environment, he came to believe the Eucharist was "a symbolic action to commemorate Christ's sacrifice", and proceeded with his ordination to the priesthood in 1941. After the war, he resumed his roles at King's College where he taught mainly ex-servicemen returning to their studies.

In 1949, he once more moved from Cambridge to Oxford, where he had been appointed fellow and chaplain of Keble College, Oxford.

== Academic career ==
- King's College, Cambridge, Lecturer in Divinity, 1938–1949
- Eton College, Assistant Master, 1940–1944
- Keble College, Oxford, Fellow and Chaplain, 1949–1971
- University of Cambridge, Ely Professor of Divinity, 1971–1980
- University of Cambridge, D.Litt., 1978
- Elected Fellow of the British Academy, 1980

=== Field of research ===
Stead was particularly interested in the application of the Aristotelian concept of substance (ousia) to Christian theology and in the use of the term 'homoousios', initially in a context deemed heretical (in the teaching of Paul of Samosata) by the Council of Antioch (AD 268), subsequently more authoritatively by the Council of Nicaea (AD 325), which in turn gave rise to over half a century of heated discussion. His 1977 book Divine Substance is widely cited among patristic scholars. Stead's interest (taking in en route Marius Victorinus and Gregory of Nyssa) extended to Augustine and John Philoponus' use of the concept.

Stead made numerous contributions to better understanding of the teaching of Arius, the Alexandrian theologian in opposition to whose teaching the Council of Nicaea adopted the term 'homoousios'. He also wrote on Athanasius, Gregory of Nyssa, and Valentinian Gnosticism, as well as on general philosophical issues such as the freedom of the will and concept of mind in the Church Fathers. See the two volumes of his collected papers which are listed below.

- Marlborough College, graduated 1933
- King's College, Cambridge, B.A., 1935
- New College, Oxford, ?
- Cuddesdon College, Ordained Deacon 1938, Priest 1941

== Personal life ==
In 1958, Stead married Elizabeth Odom. Together they had three children: on daughter and two sons.

== Works ==
- "Non-Responsible Morality", (Analysis), 1949
- "On Total Depravity", (The Church Quarterly Review), 1950
- Divine Substance (ISBN 0198266308), 1977
- Substance and Illusion in the Christian Fathers (ISBN 978-0860781721), 1985 (collected papers)
- Philosophie und Theologie I: Die Zeit der Alten Kirche (Theologische Wissenschaft) (ISBN 978-3170089242), 1990
- Philosophy in Christian Antiquity (ISBN 978-0521469555), 1996
- Doctrine and Philosophy in Early Christianity (ISBN 086078830X), 2000 (collected papers)
- "Kategorienlehre", Reallexikon fûr Antike und Christentum, Band XX, Stuttgart, 2004.
- Also: The Birth of the Steam Locomotive (ISBN 978-1902702087), 2002

== Festschrift ==
Christian Faith and Greek Philosophy in Late Antiquity: Essays in Tribute to George Christopher Stead (ed. L. R. Wickham & C.P. Bammel) (ISBN 9004096051), 1993
