= Caroline Bammel =

English ecclesiastical historian

Caroline Bammel FBA
- Born: Caroline Penrose Hammond; 6 July 1940; Falmouth, Cornwall, England
- Died: 31 October 1995 (aged 55); Cambridge, England
- Spouse: Ernst Bammel (m. 1979)
- Father: N. G. L. Hammond

Academic background
- Education: Girton College, Cambridge (BA, PhD)
- Doctoral advisor: Henry Chadwick

Academic work
- Discipline: Ecclesiastical history and classics
- Sub-discipline: History of early Christianity; Origen; early Christian writers
- Institutions: LMU Munich; Girton College, Cambridge; Faculty of Divinity, University of Cambridge

Caroline Penrose Bammel, FBA (née Hammond; 6 July 1940 – 31 October 1995), also known as Caroline Hammond Bammel, was a Cornish ecclesiastical historian, classicist, and academic, who specialised in the history of early Christianity. She was a Fellow of Girton College, Cambridge, from 1968 to 1995, and Reader in Early Church History at the University of Cambridge from 1992 to 1995.

== Early life and education ==
Bammel was born on 6 July 1940 in Falmouth, Cornwall. She first met her father, N. G. L. Hammond, at the age of five as he had been away fighting in the Second World War.

She was educated at Clifton High School, then an all-girls private school in Clifton, Bristol. In October 1959 she matriculated into Girton College, Cambridge, to study classics. Her tutors included Alison Duke and Robert Runcie. She graduated with a second class Bachelor of Arts (BA) degree in 1962.

Bammel remained at Girton College to research "the continuity and discontinuity between the 'classical' Greek and Latin world and the new attitudes brought into being as people in the Roman Empire became Christian", and completed her Doctor of Philosophy (PhD) degree in 1966. Her doctoral supervisor was Henry Chadwick. and her thesis was entitled 'The manuscript tradition of Origen's commentary on Romans in the Latin translation by Rufinus'.

== Academic career ==
For the 1965/1966 academic year, Bammel was an Alexander von Humboldt research fellow at LMU Munich. There, she was able to attend the graduate seminar run by Bernhard Bischoff on hagiography.

Bammel then returned to Girton College, Cambridge, and held a research fellowship for the next two years. In 1968, she was elected a Fellow of Girton College, and made a college lecturer in classics. She was additionally appointed Director of Studies in theology in 1976. In 1975, she also joined the staff of the Faculty of Divinity; she was an assistant lecturer from 1975 to 1980, a lecturer from 1980 to 1992, and Reader in Early Church History from 1992.

Bammel's research concerned the history of early Christianity. She took a particular interest in Origen, the Greek early Christian theologian, and other early Christian writers.

In 1994, Bammel was elected a Fellow of the British Academy (FBA), the United Kingdom's national academy for the humanities and social sciences.

== Personal life ==
In 1979, the then Caroline Hammond married Ernst Bammel, a fellow lecturer in the Faculty of Divinity. She had learnt German while an undergraduate and became fluent during her year researching in Germany. As her husband was German, they mainly spoke German at home. They did not have any children.

=== Death ===
In her late forties, Bammel was diagnosed with terminal cancer. On 31 October 1995, after a number of years living with the disease, she died in Cambridge, England; she was aged 55. She is buried in the Bammel family grave in Kessenich, Bonn, Germany.

== Selected works ==
- Bammel, Caroline P. Hammond (1985). Der Römerbrieftext des Rufin und seine Origenes-Übersetzung (in German). Freiburg im Breisgau: Herder. ISBN 978-3451004940.
- Wickham, Lionel R.; Bammel, Caroline P.; Hunter, Erica C. D., eds. (1993). Christian faith and Greek philosophy in late antiquity: essays in tribute to George Christopher Stead: in celebration of his eightieth birthday, 9th April 1993. Leiden: Brill. ISBN 978-9004096059.
- Bammel, C. P. (1995). Tradition and exegesis in early Christian writers. Aldershot, Hampshire: Variorum. ISBN 978-0860784944.
- Bammel, Caroline P. Hammond (1996). Origeniana et Rufiniana (in German). Freiburg im Breisgau: Herder. ISBN 978-3451219436.
