= William Lake (Dean of Durham) =

The Very Revd William Charles Lake

Warden of the University of Durham
- In office 1869–1894
- Preceded by: The Very Revd George Waddington
- Succeeded by: The Very Revd George William Kitchin

Dean of Durham
- In office 1869–1894
- Preceded by: The Very Revd George Waddington
- Succeeded by: The Very Revd George William Kitchin

Personal details
- Born: 9 January 1817
- Died: 8 December 1897 (aged 80) Torquay, Devon
- Education: Balliol College, Oxford
- Profession: Dean and Warden

William Charles Lake (9 January 1817 – 8 December 1897) was Dean of Durham and Warden of its university from 1869 to 1894.

== Life ==
He was the eldest son of Captain Charles Lake of the Scots fusilier guards. He was educated at Rugby under Dr. Arnold, where he became the lifelong friend of his school-fellow, Arthur Penrhyn Stanley, and Balliol, where he was elected Fellow in 1838 and was President of the Oxford Union.

He was ordained in 1842, but remained at Oxford until 1858. In that year he became Rector of Huntspill; and in 1860 Canon of Wells.

Meanwhile, Lake's linguistic abilities had led to his appointment by Lord Panmure as a member of the commission of 1856, to report on military education on the continent. He had won the prize at Oxford in 1840, for his Latin essay on the Roman army as an obstacle to civil liberty. He also served on the Newcastle commission of 1858 to inquire into popular education, and on the royal commission upon military education of 1868. On 9 August 1869, Lake was nominated by Gladstone for the deanery of Durham. In 1881, he was a member of the ecclesiastical court's commission. His theological position was that of a moderate high churchman, and in 1880 he joined Dean Church and others in endeavouring to induce Gladstone and Archbishop Tait to bring forward legislation modifying the Public Worship Regulation Act.

During Lake's decanate, Durham Cathedral was restored. He exercised an important influence over Durham University of which he was warden, and education in the north of England generally owed much to his efforts. The foundation in 1871 of the Durham College of Science, located in Newcastle, was very largely his work. He resigned the deanery, owing to failing health, in 1894, and went to live at Torquay. There he died suddenly on 8 December 1897.

== Family ==
He married, in June 1881, Miss Katherine Gladstone, a niece of the premier, who survived him.

== Works ==
Lake published nothing separately but a few sermons and a pamphlet, "The Inspiration of Scripture and Eternal Punishment, with a preface on the Oxford Declaration and on F. D. Maurice's Letter to the Bishop of London," 1864. But he contributed to the Life of his friend Tait some highly interesting recollections, and especially a valuable picture of the independent position he held at Oxford, and an account from intimate knowledge of his life as head of Rugby, bishop of London, and primate. Lake also supplied to Mr. Wilfrid Ward's W. G. Ward and the Oxford Movement (1889) some reminiscences of Ward, who was for some time his mathematical tutor at Balliol and exercised some influence over his tone of thought.

== Sources ==
- Curthoys, M. C. "Lake, William Charles (1817–1897)". Oxford Dictionary of National Biography (online ed.). Oxford University Press. doi:10.1093/ref:odnb/15904. (Subscription, Wikipedia Library access or UK public library membership required.)

Church of England titles
Preceded by George Waddington	Dean of Durham; 1869–1894	Succeeded by George William Kitchin
Academic offices
Preceded by The Very Revd George Waddington	Warden of the University of Durham; 1869 - 1894	Succeeded by The Very Revd George William Kitchin
