= George Waddington =

English priest, traveller and church historian (1793-1869)

Warden of the University of Durham
- In office 1862–1869
- Preceded by: Charles Thorp
- Succeeded by: William Lake

Dean of Durham
- In office 1840–1869
- Preceded by: John Jenkinson
- Succeeded by: William Lake

Personal details
- Born: 7 September 1793 Tuxford, Nottinghamshire, Great Britain
- Died: 20 July 1869 (aged 75) Durham, County Durham, United Kingdom
- Education: Trinity College, Cambridge
- Profession: Dean and Warden

George Waddington (/ˈwɒdɪŋtən/; 7 September 1793 – 20 July 1869) was an English priest, traveller and church historian.

== Life ==
He was the son of George Waddington (1754?-1824), vicar of Tuxford and Anne Dollond, the youngest daughter of the optician Peter Dollond. He was educated at Charterhouse School from 1808 to 1811, and then entered Trinity College, Cambridge, where he was admitted as a scholar in 1812.

His career at the university was distinguished. He was Browne medallist for the Latin ode in 1811, and for epigrams in 1814, Davies's university scholar in 1813, and chancellor's English medallist in 1813. He graduated Bachelor of Arts (BA) in 1815, being senior optime in the mathematical tripos and the first chancellor's medallist, and in 1816 he was member's prizeman. He printed for circulation among his friends the Latin ode (1811) and his English poem "Columbus". Waddington was admitted minor fellow of Trinity College, Cambridge, in 1817, and major fellow in 1818; he proceeded Master of Arts (MA Cantab) 1818, and was created Doctor of Divinity (DD) of Durham University in 1840. He was an original member of the Athenaeum Club, London on its foundation in 1824. He had in the meantime published (1822), in conjunction with Barnard Hanbury, his Journal of a Visit to some parts of Ethiopia, describing a journey from Wadi Halfa to Meroë and back. Waddington was responsible for the authorship and for the seventeen drawings in their original state. He next brought out in 1825 a discriminating and impartial account of A Visit to Greece in 1823 and 1824, which passed into a second edition and in the same year. In 1829 he issued a volume on The Present Condition and Prospects of the Greek or Oriental Church, with some Letters written from the Convent of the Strophades, which, when revised, was reissued in a new edition in 185. The letters were addressed to "T.", probably Connop Thirlwall, his contemporary at school and college.

About 1826, Waddington was ordained in the Church of England, and in December 1827 he preached the sermon in the chapel of Trinity College on Commemoration day. He was presented by Trinity College to the perpetual curacy of St Mary the Great, Cambridge, on 1 February 1833, and on 17 June 1834 was presented by Trinity to the vicarage of Masham and Kirkby-Malzeard in Yorkshire, being also appointed on 1 October in that year commissary and official of the prebend of Masham. On 14 April 1833, he was collated to the prebendal stall of Ferring in Chichester Cathedral and held it until 1841. He preached his farewell sermon at Masham on 27 December 1840.

Waddington was installed in the deanery of Durham on 25 September 1840, and became warden of Durham University in 1862. He died at Durham on 20 July 1869 and was buried on the north side of the cathedral yard. In 1870, in memory of him and of his brother Horatio Waddington who had died in 1867, his sisters founded the Waddington classical scholarship at Cambridge.

== Works ==
The best-known works of Waddington are those on ecclesiastical history. The first of them described the History of the Church from the Earliest Ages to the Reformation (1833, 2 vols.; 2nd edition revised in 1835, 3 vols.) The other set of the History of the Reformation on the Continent (1841, 3 vols.) He also published some single sermons and addresses, and three lectures on "National Education in England".

== Sources ==
- John Le Neve, Fasti, i. 284, iii. 301
- Men of the Time, 7th ed.
- Parish's Carthusians
- Hare's Story of my Life, ii. 265
- Gentleman's Magazine 1824, ii. 280.

Academic offices
| Preceded by Charles Thorp | Warden of the University of Durham; 1862–1869 | Succeeded by William Lake |
