= Bernard Adams (writer) =

British military officer (1890–1917)

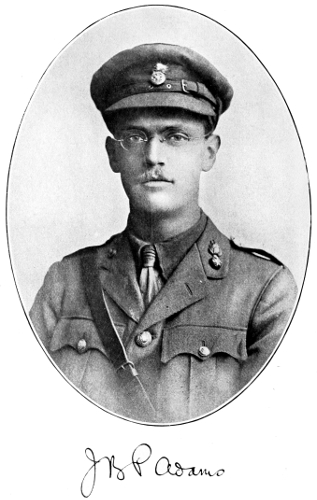
Bernard Adams in his captain's uniform, from the frontispiece of the 1st edition of Nothing of Importance

John Bernard Pye Adams (15 November 1890 – 27 February 1917) was a British army officer during World War I and a writer. His book of memoirs, Nothing of Importance, was the first published book about life in the trenches, and the only one published before the end of the war. Adams did not live to see its publication, dying in France of wounds suffered while leading an attack in February 1917.

== Early life and education ==
Bernard Adams was born in Beckenham, Kent, the third of four children and the only son of Harold John and Georgina Adams. He attended Clare House School in Beckenham for his primary education. Then from 1904 to 1909 he attended Malvern School, an English public school in Worcestershire. He proved to be a brilliant scholar, and won prizes for Shakespeare recitation, ancient history, Greek and Latin prose, and in Divinity. He then attended St. John's College, Cambridge, where he earned Browne Medals for Latin ode and Greek epigram in 1911, and Greek epigram in 1912 before graduating with a Bachelor of Arts (First Class) in 1913.

== War ==
After graduation, Adams worked for a year as Warden of the House for Indian Students in London, with a plan to become a missionary in India. When England declared war against Germany in August 1914, Adams was torn — as a prospective missionary, his life's work would be to promote peace, but he also felt it was his duty to enlist. He joined the 1st Battalion of the Royal Welsh Fusiliers, commissioned as a lieutenant; it was the same regiment in which poets Siegfried Sassoon, Robert Graves, and David Jones also enlisted. He was assigned to a reserve battalion in England.

In October 1915, the Royal Welsh Fusiliers took part in the Battle of Loos and suffered heavy casualties. Adams was subsequently recalled from the reserves and assigned to active duty in the front lines in France with a field rank of captain. He was assigned to a relatively quiet sector of trenches near Fricourt, allowing him to adapt to the daily routine of trench life without serious incident, although he witnessed daily casualties (called "wastage") due to incidental artillery fire and snipers. During one rest and recuperation break, some of his fellow officers organized a revue concert featuring well-known London actor and singer Basil Hallam, who was stationed nearby as an observation balloon observer. (Hallam would be killed in action in August 1917.)

On the night of 7 June 1916, while supervising a group of soldiers setting up barbed wire in no man's land, Adams was shot in the forearm by a German sniper. The wound was serious, and Adams was evacuated to England to recover — thereby missing the regiment's futile assault a month later on Mametz Wood as part of the Battle of the Somme.

During his convalescence, Adams wrote his memoirs of trench life, Nothing of Importance. Similar to Canadian chaplain Frederick George Scott's The Great War As I Saw It, Adams' book was not about grand strategies or major battles — Adams simply told the story of his day-to-day experiences on the front lines. In keeping with operational security while the war was still being fought, Adams changed all the names of his fellow soldiers, and even referred to his regiment simply as "a Welsh battalion."

After finishing the manuscript, Adams returned to the front on 31 January 1917, in time to take part in the British offensives in the Somme area. On 26 February 1917, while leading an attack near Serre, Somme, Adams was gravely wounded. He died the next day in a field hospital and was buried in Couin New British Cemetery near Doullens, France.

== Nothing of Importance ==
One of Adams' sisters shepherded her late brother's manuscript through publication, and Nothing of Importance: A Record of 8 Months at the Front with a Welsh Battalion, October 1915–June 1916 was published in 1917 by Methuen Publishing in Britain, and in 1918 by Robert M. McBride & Co. in New York. It became the first published memoir about life in the trenches, and the only one published in Britain while the war was still being fought.

The book was well-received by critics. The Times commented, "Captain Adams writes only of the things concerning which he can say that he was a part of what he saw; and it so happened that he saw only quite minor operations. But these things he describes with a sure literary touch. A good deal of his book is reproduced from a diary, or from letters written at the time; but he is the master, not the slave, of these contemporary documents, and knows when to cut and when to summarise. [...] The dominant mood is serious; and the seriousness culminates in his last pages in a passionate indictment of war."

The Daily Telegraph also gave a good review, noting "With exemplary modesty the title of this book completely belies its contents. So far from containing 'nothing of importance,' it will rank, beyond question, among the most significant records which the war has produced. For it is a work of the rarest vividness and distinction; and at every turn it is marked by a radiantly sincere determination to tell the truth about things which have generally been grossly distorted by sentiment and cant. Nothing more real or more poignant has been written about the war, while a quiet sense of humour, playing over the narrative, continually keeps the writer upon the safe side of exaggeration."

Siegfried Sassoon, who had also been badly wounded on the same day as Adams and had been invalided back to England, received a copy of the book and annotated it, noting on the fly leaf that Adams had renamed him "Scott". In August 1918, when fellow war poet Wilfred Owen told Sassoon he was being returned to the front after convalescing from a serious wound, Sassoon gave Owen his annotated copy of Nothing of Importance. Owen was killed in November 1918, less than a week before the end of the war. The copy of Nothing of Importance given to him is now held in the Wilfred Owen Collection in the Bodleian Library, at the University of Oxford.
