= Arthur Huddleston =

British colonial civil servant (1880–1948)

Sir Arthur James Croft Huddleston CMG OBE (6 July 1880 – 18 February 1948) was a British colonial civil servant.

Huddleston was born at Cambridge. He was the son of Tristram Frederick Croft Huddleston and his wife Bessie, daughter of Rev. J. Chataway. He was educated at Eton and King's College, Cambridge, where his father had been a fellow.

He was governor of Khartoum Province, 1920–22 and Blue Nile Province 1922–27. He was then Financial Secretary in the Sudanese Government, 1928–31; and its Economic Adviser, 1931–32. He was Director of the Royal Technical College, Glasgow, from 1933 to 1945.

He was appointed OBE in 1919, CMG in 1927 and Knight Bachelor in 1933.
