= Ali al-Hujwiri =

Persian Muslim scholar and mystic (c. 1009–1072/77)

- علی الھجویری
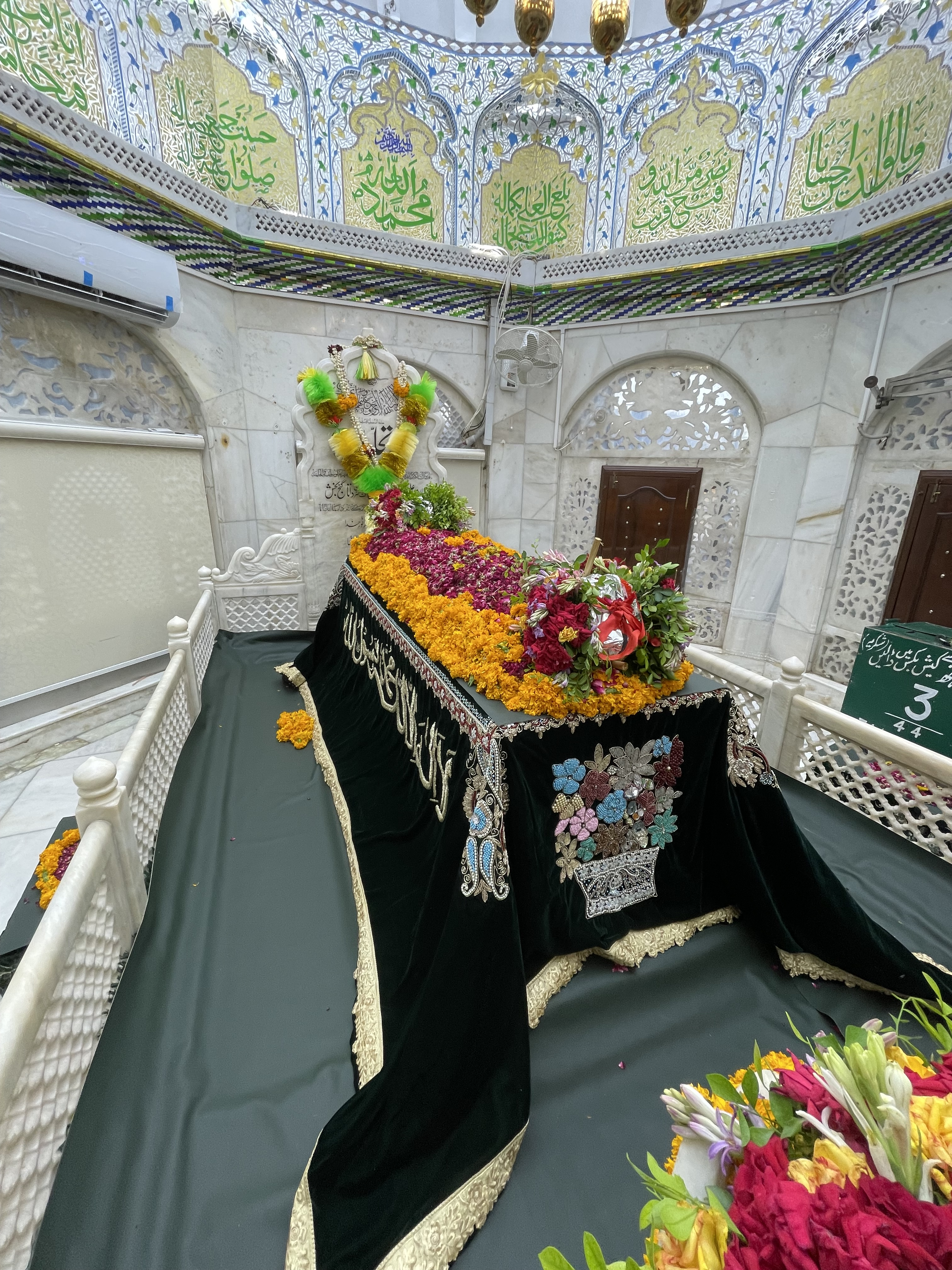
- The grave of Ali al-Hujwiri at his tomb in Lahore

Personal life
- Born: c. 1009 Hujwir, Ghaznavid Empire
- Died: c. 8 August 1072 Lahore, Ghaznavid Empire
- Resting place: Data Darbar
- Era: Islamic Golden Age
- Main interest: Islam
- Notable work: Kashf al-Mahjub

Religious life
- Religion: Sunni Islam
- Denomination: Sunni
- Lineage: Junaydiyya
- Jurisprudence: Hanafi

Abu al-Hasan Ali ibn Uthman al-Jullabi al-Hujwiri (Persian: ابو الحسن علی بن عثمان الجلابی الھجویری, romanized: Abū al-Ḥasan ʿAlī ibn ʿUthmān al-Jullābī al-Hujwīrī; c. 1009-1072/77), better known as Data Sahib (Persian: داتا صاحب, romanized: Dātā Ṣaḥib) and Ali Hujwiri, was a Islamic scholar and mystic who authored Kashf al-Mahjub, the earliest treatise on Sufism in the Persian language. Born in the Ghaznavid Empire, Hujwiri is believed to have contributed "significantly" to the spread of Islam in South Asia through his preaching.

Hujwiri is regarded as the patron saint of Lahore, Pakistan by the Sufis of the area and his tomb-shrine, known as the Data Darbar, is one of the most frequented shrines in South Asia. Currently, it is Pakistan's largest shrine "in numbers of annual visitors and in the size of the shrine complex," and, having been nationalized in 1960, is managed today by the Department of Awqaf and Religious Affairs of the Punjab. The mystic himself remains a "household name" in the daily Islam of South Asia. In 2016, the Government of Pakistan declared 21 November to be a public holiday for the commemoration of the commencement of Ali Hujwiri's three-day death anniversary.

== Background ==
Ali Hujwiri was born in Ghazni, in present-day Afghanistan, in around 1009 to Uthman ibn Ali or Bu Ali. A Syed, his genealogy has been traced from Ali, the fourth Rashidun caliph, through Hasan ibn Ali. He later migrated to Punjab from Khorasan. According to the autobiographical information recorded in his own Kashf al-maḥjūb, Ali Hujwiri travelled "widely through the Ghaznavid Empire and beyond, spending considerable time in Baghdad, Nishapur, and Damascus, where he met many of the pre-eminent Ṣūfīs of his time." In matters of jurisprudence, he received training in the Hanafi rite of orthodox Sunni law under various teachers. As for his Sufi training, he was linked through his teacher al-Khuttalī to al-Husrī, Abu Bakr al-Shibli (d. 946), and Junayd al-Baghdadi (d. 910). For a short period, the mystic is believed to have lived in Iraq. His brief marriage during this period is said to have been unhappy. Eventually, Ali Hujwiri settled in Lahore, where he died with the reputation of a renowned preacher and teacher. After his death, Ali Hujwiri was unanimously regarded as a great saint by popular acclaim.

== Spiritual Lineage ==
1. Ali
2. Hasan al-Basri
3. Habib al-Ajami
4. Dawud al-Ta'i
5. Ma'ruf al-Karkhi
6. Sari al-Saqati
7. Junayd al-Baghdadi
8. Abu Bakr al-Shibli
9. Ali Husri Husri
10. Abu al-Fazl Khutli
11. Ali al-Hujwiri

== Views ==
=== Companions of Muhammad ===
==== Abu Bakr ====
Ali Hujwiri described the first caliph of Islam Abu Bakr (r. 632–634) as "the Greatest Truthful," and deemed him "the leader (imām) of all the folk of this Path." Eulogizing Abu Bakr's piety, Ali Hujwiri praised him for how "he gave away all his wealth and his clients, and clad himself in a woolen garment, and came to the Messenger Muhammad " and stated elsewhere that he "is placed by the Sufi shaykhs at the head of those who have adopted the contemplative life." In conclusion, Ali Hujwiri stated: "The whole sect of Sufis has made him their patron in stripping themselves of worldly things, in fixity, in an eager desire for poverty, and in longing to renounce authority. He is the leader of the Muslims in general, and of the Sufis in particular."

==== Umar ====
Hujwiri described the second caliph of Islam Umar (r. 634–644) as one "specially distinguished by sagacity and resolution," and said that "the Sufis make him their model in wearing a patched garment and rigorously performing the duties of religion." He further praised Umar for his "very exalted station" in combining a life of worldly duties with intense and consistent spiritual devotion.

==== Uthman ====
Regarding the third of the Rightly Guided Caliphs of the early Islamic community, Uthman (r. 644–656), Hujwiri stated that the "Sufis take Uthman as their exemplar in sacrificing life and property, in resigning their affairs to God, and in sincere devotion."

==== Ali ====
With respect to the fourth of the Rightly Guided Caliphs of Islam, Ali (r. 656–661), al-Hujwiri stated: "His renown and rank in this Path were very high. He explained the principles of Divine Truth with exceeding subtlety.... Ali is a model for the Sufis in respect to the truths of outward expressions and the subtleties of inward meanings, the stripping of one's self of all property either of this world or of the next, and consideration of the Divine Providence." He also approvingly cited Junayd of Baghdad's saying: "Ali is our Shaykh as regards the principles and as regards the endurance of affliction."

=== Family of Muḥammad (صلی اللہ علیہ و سلم) ===
==== Hasan ====
Regarding the grandson of Muhammad and son of Ali, Hasan ibn Ali (d. 670), Ali Hujwiri described him as one "profoundly versed in [spiritual truths]" and as one of "the true saints and shaykhs" of the Islamic community.

==== Husayn ====
With respect to the younger grandson of Muhammad and son of Ali, Husayn ibn Ali (d. 680), Ali Hujwiri emphatically declared: "He is the martyr of Karbala and all Sufis are agreed that he was in the right. So long as the Truth was apparent, he followed it; but when it was lost, he drew the sword and never rested until he sacrificed his dear life for God's sake."

==== Jafar al-Sadiq ====
Ali Hujwiri described Jafar al-Sadiq (d. 765), the great-grandson of Husayn, as one "celebrated among the Sufi shaykhs for the subtlety of discourse and his acquaintance with spiritual truths."

==== Muhammad al-Baqir ====
Regarding the grandson of Husayn, Muhammad al-Baqir (d. 733), Ali Hujwiri stated: "He was distinguished for his knowledge of the abstruse science and for his subtle indications as to the meaning of the Qur'an."

==== Zayn al-Abidin ====
Ali Hujwiri praised Zayn al-Abidin (d. 713), the son of Husayn, for being of "the character of those who have attained perfect rectitude."

=== Doctors of law ===
==== Abu Hanifa ====
Regarding Abu Hanifa (d. 767), the traditionally recognized founder of the Hanafi school of orthodox Sunni jurisprudence, Ali Hujwiri stated: "He is the Imām of Imāms (lit. 'Leader of Leaders') and the exemplar of the Sunnis."

==== Ahmad ibn Hanbal ====
Regarding Ahmad ibn Hanbal (d. 855), the traditionally recognized founder of the Hanbali school of orthodox Sunni jurisprudence, Ali Hujwiri stated: "He was distinguished by devoutness and piety, and was the guardian of the Traditions of the Messenger. Sufis of all sects regard him as blessed. He associated with great shaykhs ... his miracles were manifest and his intelligence sound. The doctrines attributed to him today by certain anthropomorphists are inventions and forgeries; he is to be acquitted of all notions of that sort. He had a firm belief in the principles of religion, and his creed was approved by all the theologians.... He is clear of all [the slander] that is alleged against him."

=== Law and jurisprudence ===
As a Sunni Muslim, Ali Hujwiri believed it was a spiritual necessity to follow one of the orthodox schools of religious law, being himself a staunch follower of the Hanafi school of orthodox Sunni jurisprudence. As such, Ali Hujwiri condemned as "heretics" all those who espoused mystical doctrines without following all the precepts of the religious law (sharīʿah). He further denounced all those "who held that ... when the Truth is revealed the Law is abolished". For Ali Hujwiri, then, all true and orthodox mystical activities needed to take place within the boundaries of the religious law.

=== Dancing ===
According to Ali Hujwiri, purely secular dancing "has no foundation either in the religious law of Islam or in the path of Sufism, because all reasonable men agree that it is a diversion when it is in earnest, and an impropriety when it is in jest". As such, he censured "all the traditions cited in its favour" as "worthless". As for the legitimate ecstatic experiences of some Sufis, whose bodies convulsed when their "heart [throbbed] with exhilaration and rapture" on account of their intense love of God, Ali Hujwiri declared that these movements only outwardly resembled dancing and opined that "those who call it 'dancing' are utterly wrong. It is a state that cannot be explained in words: 'without experience no knowledge'."

=== Poetry ===
Ali Hujwiri deemed it lawful to listen to virtuous poetry, saying: "It is permissible to hear poetry. The Messenger heard it, and the Companions not only heard it but also spoke it." Due to these reasons, he censured those who "declare that it is unlawful to listen to any poetry whatever, and pass their lives in defaming their brother Muslims." Regarding the hearing of secular poetry, however, Ali Hujwiri's opinion was far stricter, and he deemed it "unlawful" to hear poetry or love-songs that enticed the hearer to carnal desires through detailed descriptions "of the face and hair and mole of the beloved." In conclusion, he stated that those who regarded the hearing of such poetry "as absolutely lawful must also regard looking and touching as lawful, which is infidelity and heresy."

=== Saints ===
Ali Hujwiri supported the orthodox belief in the existence of saints. As such, he stated: "You must know that the principle and foundation of Sufism and Knowledge of God rests on sainthood, the reality of which is unanimously affirmed by all the teachers, though every one has expressed himself in a different language." Elsewhere, he said: "God has saints whom He has specially distinguished by His Friendship and whom He has chosen to be the governors of His Kingdom and has marked out to manifest by His Actions and has peculiarly favored with diverse kinds of miracles and has purged of natural corruptions and has delivered from subjection to their lower soul and passion, so that all their thoughts are of Him and their intimacy is with Him alone. Such have been in past ages, and are now, and shall be hereafter until the Day of Resurrection, because God exalted this community above all others and has promised to preserve the religion of Muhammad.... The visible proof [of Islam] is to be found among the saints and the elect of God."

== Works ==
=== Kashf al-maḥjūb ===
Ali Hujwiri is perhaps most famous for writing what has been described as "the earliest formal treatise on Ṣūfism in Persian," the Kashf al-maḥjūb (Unveiling of the Hidden). The work presents itself as an introduction to the various aspects of orthodox Sufism and also provides biographies of the greatest saints of the Islamic community. The Kashf al-maḥjūb is the only work of Ali Hujwiri that has remained until today. Egyptian Sufi scholar Abul Azaem has translated this work into Arabic.

=== Other works ===
Reynold Alleyne Nicholson provided a short list of Ali Hujwiri's writings (all of which are lost aside from the Kashf al-maḥjūb), which included, amongst others, the following unpreserved works:

1. Dīwān (Songs of Hujwirī), a collection of the saint's poems.
2. Minhāj al-Dīn (The Way of the Religion), a work containing: (i) a detailed account of those companions of Muhammad whom Ali Hujwiri deemed the precursors of the Sufis; and (ii) a full biography of the executed 10th-century mystic Mansur al-Hallaj (d. 922).
3. Asrār al-khiraq wa 'l-ma'ūnāt', a work on the woolen, patched garments worn by the Sufis of his time.
4. An untitled work explaining the meaning behind the mystical sayings of Mansur al-Hallaj.
5. Kitāb al-bayān li-ahl al-'iyān, a treatise on the orthodox interpretation of the Sufic ideal of Fana.

Of other books written by Sheikh Ali Hujwiri:

1. Kashf al-Asrār, a short Persian treatise on how to fully adopt the path of Tasawwuf, translated with in-depth commentary by El-Sheikh Syed Mubarik Ali Shah El-Gillani.

== Assessment and legacy ==
Mu'in al-Din Chishti stayed at al-Hujwiri's mausoleum and quoted a tribute to him as a narration; گنج بخش فیضِ عالَم مظہرِ نورِ خدا ناقصاں را پیرِ کامل ، کاملاں را راہنما Ganj Bakhsh-e-Faiz-e-Alam Mazhar-e-Nur-e-Khuda, Na Qasaan-ra Pir-i Kamil, Kamilaan-ra Rahnuma. Al-Hujwiri is believed to have contributed "significantly" to the spread of Islam in South Asia through his preaching, with one historian describing him as "one of the most important figures to have spread Islam in the Indian subcontinent."

In the present day, al-Hujwiri is venerated as the main saint of Lahore, Pakistan by the traditional Sunni Muslims of the area. He is, moreover, one of the most widely venerated saints in the entire South Asia, and his tomb-shrine in Lahore, popularly known as Data Darbar, is one of the most frequented shrines in South Asia. At present, it is Pakistan's largest shrine "in numbers of annual visitors and in the size of the shrine complex," and, having been nationalized in 1960, is managed today by the Department of Awqaf and Religious Affairs of the Punjab. The mystic himself remains a "household name" in the daily Islam of South Asia. In 2016, the Government of Pakistan declared 21 November to be a public holiday for the commemoration of the commencement of al-Hujwiri's three-day death anniversary.
