= Reynold A. Nicholson =

British orientalist (1868–1945)

Reynold A. Nicholson FBA
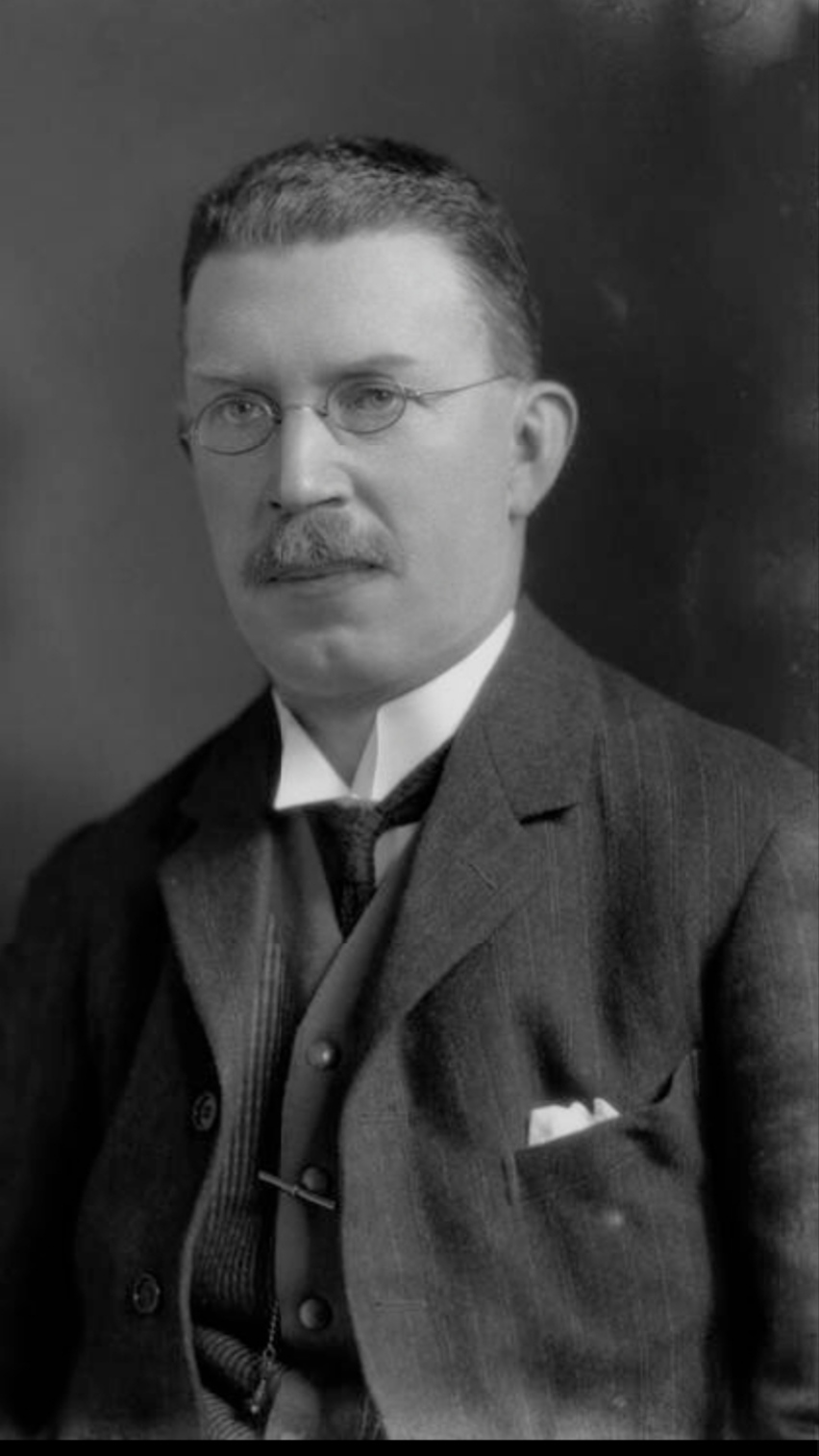
- Born: 18 August 1868; Keighley, West Riding of Yorkshire, England
- Died: 27 August 1945 (aged 77); Chester, Cheshire, England
- Education: University of Aberdeen; Trinity College, Cambridge
- Occupations: Orientalist; translator; scholar
- Parent: Henry Alleyne Nicholson (father)
- Writing career
- Notable awards: Porson Prize (1890)

Reynold Alleyne Nicholson, FBA (18 August 1868 – 27 August 1945), or R. A. Nicholson, was an eminent English orientalist, scholar of both Islamic literature and Islamic mysticism, and widely regarded as one of the greatest Rumi (Mevlana or Mawlana) scholars and translators in the English language.

== Life ==
The son of Henry Alleyne Nicholson, he was born at Keighley, West Riding of Yorkshire, England and died at Chester, Cheshire. He was educated at University of Aberdeen and Trinity College, Cambridge, where he won the Porson Prize twice.

Nicholson was professor of Persian at University College London from 1901 to June 1902, then lecturer in Persian at the University of Cambridge from 1902 to 1926, and Sir Thomas Adams's Professor of Arabic at the University of Cambridge from 1926 to 1933. He is considered a leading scholar in Islamic literature and Islamic mysticism who exercised a lasting influence on Islamic studies. He was able to study and translate major Sufi texts in Arabic, Persian, Punjabi and Ottoman Turkish into English. Nicholson wrote two influential books: Literary History of The Arabs (1907) and The Mystics of Islam (1914).

He was one of the original trustees of the Gibb Memorial Trust.

== Works ==
- Studies in Islamic Mysticism, Cambridge University Press, 1921.
- Le soufisme en 101 définitions, Éditions i, mai 2023 (ISBN 978-2-37650-105-3)

=== Works on Rumi ===
Nicholson's magnum opus was his work on Rumi's Masnavi, published in eight volumes between 1925 and 1940. He produced the first critical Persian edition of the Masnavi, the first full translation of it into English, and the first commentary on the entire work in English. This work has been highly influential in the field of Rumi studies worldwide.

=== Work on Ali Hujwiri Daata Ganj Bakhsh ===
Nicholson translated the famous Persian book on sufism Kashf ul Mahjoob into English which was written by the famous saint of the Subcontinent, Ali Hujwiri Daata Ganj Bakhsh

=== Works on Iqbal ===
Being a teacher of the Indian subcontinent's scholar and poet, Muhammad Iqbal, Nicholson translated Iqbal's first philosophical poetry book, Asrar-i-Khudi, from Persian into English and titled itThe Secrets of the Self.

=== Other significant translations ===
- The Sufi treatise of Hujviri
- Rumi's Mathnawi
- Rumi's Divan-i Shams-i Tabrizi (Divan e Shams), 1898
- Ibn Arabi's Tarjumān al-Ashwāq (1911)
- Poetry by the Sindhi language poet Shah Abdul Latif Bhittai
- Poetry by the Punjabi language poet Bulleh Shah

=== Students ===
Among Nicholson's students was A. J. Arberry, a translator of Rumi and the Quran. Another student, Muhammad Iqbal, was a famous poet and has been called the "Spiritual Father of Pakistan". He briefly tutored Shoghi Effendi, Guardian of the Baha'i Faith, during summer holidays when the latter was a student at Oxford in 1920-1921. The subject was translation techniques.

== See also ==
- Persian literature
- Sufi poetry
- Iranology
- Ali Hujwiri
- Rumi
- Iqbal
- The Secrets of the Self
