= Kashf al-Mahjub =

Treatise on Sufism by al-Hujwiri

Kashf al-Mahjub كَشف الْمَحجُوب
- Author: Al-Hujwiri
- Translator: Reynold A. Nicholson
- Language: Persian
- Genre: Sufism

Kashf al-Mahjub (Persian: كَشف الْمَحجُوب, romanized: Kashf al-Maḥjūb, lit. 'Revelation of the Hidden') was the first formal persian treatise on Sufism, compiled in the 11th century by the Persian scholar al-Hujwiri. The work contains a complete system of Sufism with its doctrines and practices. Mystical controversies and current opinions are illustrated where many are clarified by presenting his experiences. The book with its Persian flavor of philosophical speculation and fiction is itself a piece of the identity of al-Hujwiri (also known as Data Ganj Baksh).

== Introduction ==
In composing this book, al-Hujwiri was inconvenienced by the loss of his books he had left at Ghazna, Afghanistan. Hence, it must have taken him a considerable amount of time to write this book. He is known to have travelled for at least 40 years to places such as Syria, Iraq, Persia, Kohistan, Azerbaijan, Tabaristan, Kerman, Greater Khorasan, Transoxiana, Baghdad amongst other places to acquire knowledge. His visit to the shrine of Bilal (Damascus, Syria) and Abu Saeed Abul Khayr (Mihne village, Greater Khorasan) are especially mentioned in the book. He met many Sufis during his travels, although he followed the Junaidia order of Junayd Baghdadi and hence, mystically accepted ‘sobriety’ over ‘intoxication’ to illustrate that no one is exempted from following the religious law. Hence, he claimed that Sufism was thoroughly consistent with the principles of Islam.: "I have met over three hundred saints in Khorasan alone residing separately and who had such mystical endowments that a single one of them would have been enough for the whole world. They are the luminaries of love and prosperity on the spiritual sky of Khorasan." These visits to the saints and their shrines reflect his quest to find Murshid Kamil Akmal (Perfect Spiritual Guide). He had experienced the heights of knowledge and now he wanted to taste spirituality. The book indicates he was fond of religious spiritualism and divine wisdom. Undoubtedly, he was in search of spiritual perfection. In this book, Ali Hujwiri addresses the definition of Sufism and states that in this age, people are only obsessed with seeking pleasure and not interested to satisfy God. "Theologians have made no distinction between Ilm (knowledge) and Marifat (gnosis)…One, then, who knows the meaning and reality of a thing they call ‘arif’ and one who knows merely the verbal expression and keeps it in his memory without keeping the spiritual reality, they call him ‘alim’ For this reason, when the Sufis wish to criticize a rival, they call him danishmand (possessing knowledge). This seems objectionable but the Sufis do not blame the man for having acquired knowledge, rather they blame him for neglecting the practice of religion because the ‘alim’ depends on himself but the ‘arif’ depends on his Lord."

Of all the Sufi scholars he met, he mentions two names with utmost respect: Shaykh Ab al-Abbas Ahmad ibn Muhammad al-Ashqani and was Shaykh Abu al-Qasim Ali Gurgani.

== Contents ==
- On the Affirmation of Knowledge
- On Faqr (Poverty)
- On Sufism
- On Wearing of Patched Frocks
- On Opinions Concerning Faqr (Poverty) and Purity
- On Malamat (Blame)
- Concerning Imams who belonged to Sahabah (Companions)
- Concerning Imams who belonged to the House of the Muhammad
- Concerning Ahl-i-Suffa (People of the Veranda)
- Concerning Imams who belonged to the Tabieen (Followers)
- Concerning Imams Taba al-Tabi‘in (who followed the Followers)
- Concerning the principal Sufis of recent times
- Brief account of modern Sufis in different countries
- Concerning the doctrines held by different orders of Sufis
- Uncovering of First Veil: Marifat of Allah (Gnosis of God)
- Uncovering of Second Veil: Tawhid (Unity of God)
- Uncovering of Third Veil: Iman (Faith)
- Uncovering of Fourth Veil: Taharat (Purification from Foulness)
- Uncovering of Fifth Veil: Salat (Prayer)
- Uncovering of Sixth Veil: Zakat (Alms)
- Uncovering of Seventh Veil: Sawm (Fasting)
- Uncovering of Eighth Veil: Hajj (Pilgrimage)
- Uncovering of Ninth Veil: Companionship with rules and principles
- Uncovering of Tenth Veil: Definition of phrases of the Sufis and their ideas.
- Uncovering of Eleventh Veil: Sema (Spiritual Auditions)

== Importance in Sufism ==
The book has served as a ‘vaseela’, medium of spiritual elevation towards divinity for many Sufi saints both many of whom are quite famous all over the world. This is the reason why Moinuddin Chishti Ajmeri, a chief saint of the Chishti order, once stated that an aspiring murid (disciple) one who does not (yet) have a murshid (spiritual master), should read al-Hujwiri's book Kashf al-Mahjub, as that would (temporarily) guide him spiritually.

== Translation ==
Originally written in Persian, this book has already been translated into various languages. Manuscripts of the Kashf al-Mahjub are preserved in several European libraries. It has been lithographed in Lahore, Pakistan. Reynold A. Nicholson is known for translating Kashf al-Mahjub into English. He was the teacher of Persian and Arabic language in the University of Cambridge. In his words: "He undertook journeys to distant Islamic countries, from Syria to Turkistan in search of knowledge. He travelled extensively and searching almost every tract of land from Sindh to Caspian Sea".

== See also ==
- Ali Hujwiri
- Kashf
- Reynold A. Nicholson
