= Henry Thompson (priest) =

English cleric and author (1797–1878)

Henry Thompson (1797–1878) was an English cleric and author.

== Life ==
Thompson was born in Surrey and was admitted to St John's College, Cambridge, as a pensioner on 29 April 1818, graduating B.A. in 1822, and proceeding M.A. in 1825. In 1820, he competed for the Browne Medal, receiving an extra prize for a Latin ode. He was ordained deacon in 1823 and priest in 1827.

After being successively curate of St George's, Camberwell, Surrey (1824–7), of St Mary's, Salehurst, Sussex (1827–8), and of Wrington, Somerset (1828–1853), Thompson was appointed vicar of Chard, Somerset, on 14 September 1853, by George Henry Law. There he resided until his death on 29 November 1878. He was known as a man of conservative instincts.

== Works ==
Thompson was the author of:

- Davidica: Twelve Practical Sermons on the Life of David, London, 1827
- Pastoralia: a Manual of Helps for the Parochial Clergy, London, 1830; 2nd ed. 1832.
- The Life of Hannah More, London.
- Concionalia: Outlines of Sermons for the Christian Year, London, 1853; 2nd edit. 1862; 2nd ser. 1871.

Thompson published editions of Horace (1853, 8vo), and Virgil (1854; 3rd edit. In 1845, he translated Schiller's Maid of Orleans and William Tell. In 1850, he edited a volume of Original Ballads by living Authors, for which his friend E. A. Freeman, met at Hannah More's house at Barley-Wood, wrote nine poems. He also contributed to Lyra Sanctorum, Lyra Eucharistica, and the Churchman's Companion.

He contributed most of the classical articles to the Encyclopædia Metropolitana (1824), some of which he later published separately.

== Family ==
Thompson married in 1823, Anne Harrison Bell, daughter of James Bell, vicar of Lympne, Kent. He left two sons—Henry Bell, vicar of Tatworth, and Christopher.
