= Norman Stephen =

Scottish cricketer

Personal information
- Full name: Norman Kenneth Stephen
- Born: 24 June 1865; Kinloss, Morayshire, Scotland
- Died: 4 July 1948 (aged 83); Swiss Cottage, London, England
- Batting: Right-handed
- Bowling: Right-arm slow

Domestic team information
- Years: Team
- 1887: Cambridge University

Career statistics
Competition	First-class
Matches	4
Runs scored	6
Batting average	2.00
100s/50s	–/–
Top score	3*
Balls bowled	839
Wickets	15
Bowling average	17.40
5 wickets in innings	1
10 wickets in match	–
Best bowling	5/52
Catches/stumpings	1/–
- Source: Cricinfo, 28 July 2023

Norman Kenneth Stephen (24 June 1865 – 4 July 1948) was a Scottish cricketer who played first-class cricket in four matches for Cambridge University in 1887. He was born at Kinloss, Moray, Scotland and died at Swiss Cottage, London.

Stephen was educated at Fettes College and Trinity College, Cambridge. He was an outstanding scholar, taking a double first in classics, and winning a succession of prizes and scholarships: the Porson Prize in 1885 and 1886, the Powis medal in 1886 and 1887, the Craven scholarship in 1887 and the Chancellor's Gold Medal in 1888. As a cricketer, he played as a lower-order right-handed batsman and a right-arm slow bowler both for Fettes and for Cambridge University. He had some success as a bowler and in his first first-class match, against a team raised by C. I. Thornton, he bowled throughout the first innings and took five wickets for 52 runs in 46 overs. He continued to take wickets in his other matches across the next month, but had dropped out of the Cambridge team before the University Match against Oxford University and therefore did not win a Blue. He played no further first-class cricket after the 1887 season.

Stephen graduated from Cambridge University in 1888 with a Bachelor of Arts degree, which converted to a Master of Arts in 1893. He joined the staff of Harrow School as an assistant master on leaving Cambridge, and remained there for 37 years to his retirement in 1925, acting as house master of Druries' House from 1906 and standing in as for the head master, Lionel Ford, on occasion.
