= N. G. L. Hammond =

British historian of ancient Greece (1907–2001)

Nicholas Geoffrey Lemprière Hammond CBE DSO FBA
- Born: 15 November 1907; Ayr, Scotland
- Died: 24 March 2001 (aged 93); Cambridge, England
- Children: 3 (including Caroline Bammel)

Academic background
- Education: Gonville and Caius College, Cambridge

Academic work
- Discipline: Classicist
- Sub-discipline: Ancient history; Ancient Greece (specifically Ancient Macedonia); Philip II of Macedon; Alexander the Great
- Institutions: Clare College, Cambridge; Clifton College; University of Bristol
- Military career
- Allegiance: United Kingdom
- Branch: Special Operations Executive
- Service years: 1940–1945
- Conflicts: Second World War
- Awards: Distinguished Service Order; Order of the Phoenix (Greece)

Nicholas Geoffrey Lemprière Hammond, CBE, DSO, FBA (15 November 1907 – 24 March 2001) was a British historian, geographer, classicist and an operative for the British Special Operations Executive (SOE) in occupied Greece during the Second World War.

Hammond was seen as the leading expert on the history of ancient Macedonia. His trilogy, A History of Macedonia, has been described as the "most celebrated (and partly irreplaceable) work" on the subject. Additionally, he was recognised for his meticulous research on the geography, historical topography and history of ancient Epirus.

== Life and writings ==
Nicholas Hammond was born on 15 November 1907 in Ayr, Scotland to James Vavasour Hammond, an Episcopalian rector, and Dorothy May. Hammond studied classics at Fettes College and Gonville and Caius College, Cambridge. In 1929, while he was still a student, Hammond began his personal exploration of all the ancient sites in Epirus. He excelled in his exams and also spent vacations exploring Greece on foot, acquiring knowledge of the topography and terrain. He also spent some time in southern Albania (Northern Epirus) where he learnt the Albanian language. These abilities led him to be recruited by the Special Operations Executive during World War II in 1940. His activities included many dangerous sabotage missions in Greece (especially on the Greek island of Crete). As an officer, in 1944 he was in command of the Allied military mission to the Greek resistance in Thessaly and Macedonia. There he came to know those regions thoroughly. He published a memoir of his war service entitled Venture into Greece in 1983; he was awarded the Distinguished Service Order and the Greek Order of the Phoenix.

In the postwar period, Hammond returned to academia as senior tutor at Clare College, Cambridge. In 1954, he became headmaster of Clifton College, Bristol and in 1962 was appointed Henry Overton Wills Professor of Greek at Bristol University, a post which he held until his retirement in 1973. He was elected a Fellow of the British Academy in 1968 and an honorary member of the Centre des Nouvelles études de l'histoire, de la philosophie et des problèmes sociaux à Clermont-Ferrand in 1988.

His scholarship focused on the history of ancient Macedonia and ancient Epirus, and he was considered the leading expert on Macedonia. He was also editor and contributor to various volumes of the Cambridge Ancient History and the second edition of the Oxford Classical Dictionary. He was known for his works about Alexander the Great and for suggesting the relationship of Vergina with Aegae, the ancient Macedonian royal city, before the archaeological discoveries. In later years, Hammond backed Greece during the Macedonia name dispute.

On 24 March 2001, while attending a concert at Jesus College, Cambridge, Hammond collapsed and died at the age of 93.

== Personal life ==
Hammond was the father of two sons and three daughters including Caroline Bammel, historian of early Christianity.

== Works ==
=== Books ===
- Sir John Edwin Sandys, 1844-1922 (1932)
- A History of Greece to 322 B.C. (1959)
- Epirus: the Geography, the Ancient Remains, the History and Topography of Epirus and Adjacent Areas (1967)
- Oxford Classical Dictionary (1970) (second edition, co-edited with H. H. Scullard)
- A History of Macedonia, Volume I: Historical geography and prehistory (1972)
- The Classical Age of Greece (1975)
- Migrations and Invasions in Greece and Adjacent Areas (1976)
- A History of Macedonia, Volume II: 550-336 B.C. (1979)
- Alexander the Great: King, Commander, and Statesman (1980)
- ed. Atlas of the Greek and Roman World in Antiquity (1981)
- Venture Into Greece: With the Guerrillas, 1943-44 (1983)
- Three Historians of Alexander the Great: The so-called Vulgate authors, Diodorus, Justin, and Curtius (1983)
- A History of Macedonia, Volume III: 336-167 B.C. (1988)
- The Macedonian State: Origins, Institutions, and History (1989)
- The Miracle that was Macedonia (1991)
- The Allied Military Mission and the Resistance in West Macedonia (1993)
- Sources for Alexander the Great: An Analysis of Plutarch's 'Life' and Arrian's 'Anabasis Alexandrou' (1993)
- Philip of Macedon (1994)
- The Genius of Alexander the Great (1997)
- Poetics of Aristotle: Rearranged, Abridged and Translated for Better Understanding by the General Reader (2001)

=== Collections ===
- Collected Studies, Volume I (1993)
- Collected Studies, Volume II: Studies concerning Epirus and Macedonia before Alexander (1993)
- Collected Studies, Volume III: Alexander and his successors in Macedonia (1994)
- Collected Studies, Volume IV: Further studies on various topics (1997)
