= Edwin Gifford =

British priest (1820–1905)

Edwin Hamilton Gifford, DD (18 December 1820 – 4 May 1905) was an eminent Anglican priest, schoolmaster, and author.

== Early life, family and education ==
Edwin Gifford was born in Bristol, the sixth son of Helen and Richard Gifford. He was educated at Shrewsbury School, then at St John's College, Cambridge. In 1842, he was made Pitt Scholar, the pre-eminent scholarship for classics at the University of Cambridge. He graduated with his Bachelor of Arts (BA) degree in 1843, as the 15th Wrangler and Senior Classic.

He was ordained in the Church of England in 1845. Emma Lavinia Gifford, the first wife of Thomas Hardy, was his niece.

== Career ==
Gifford was Second Master at his old school, Shrewsbury, then Chief Master of King Edward's School, Birmingham and an honorary Canon of Worcester. Later he was Rector of Walgrave then Much Hadham. From 1884 to 1889 he was Archdeacon of London.

== Personal life and demise ==
He was married twice, firstly to Anne Yolland, then to Margaret Symons, daughter of Francis Jeune, bishop of Peterborough / sister of Baron Francis Henry Jeune; he had one daughter.

He died on 4 May 1905.

== Works ==
- Glory of God in Man, 1864
- Voices of the Prophets
- Romans in the Speaker's Commentary, 1881
- Authorship of Psalm CX, 1892
- St Cyril of Jerusalem in the Library of Nicene and Post-Nicene Fathers, 1894
- The Incarnation: A Study of Philippians 2:5-11, 1896
- Eusebius of Caesarea: Praeparatio Evangelica (as translator), 5 Vols., 1903

== Notes ==
Church of England titles
Preceded by Piers Calverley Claughton	Archdeacon of London; 1884 – 1889	Succeeded by William Macdonald Sinclair
