= Pitt Scholarship =

The Pitt Scholarship at the University of Cambridge was instituted in 1814 using surplus funds originally raised to erect a statue to William Pitt the Younger, supplemented with a donation from the Pitt Club in London. It became the pre-eminent classics University Scholarship of Great Britain.

== Recipients ==
- 1814: Marmaduke Lawson
- 1818: Horatio Waddington
- 1830: Charles Rann Kennedy
- 1835: William Gilson Humphry
- 1842: Edwin Gifford
- 1852: Francis Vaughan Hawkins
- 1858: Francis Cotterell Hodgson
- 1865: Frederick Pollock
- 1934: Christopher Stead
