= Herbert Kynaston (born 1835) =

Herbert Kynaston (né Snow; 29 June 1835 – 1 August 1910) was an Etonian schoolman and classical scholar.
