= Charles Rann Kennedy =

English lawyer & classicist (1808–1867)

Charles Rann Kennedy (1808 – 17 December 1867) was an English lawyer and classicist, best remembered for his involvement in the Swinfen will case and the issues of contingency fee agreements and legal ethics that it involved.

== Life ==
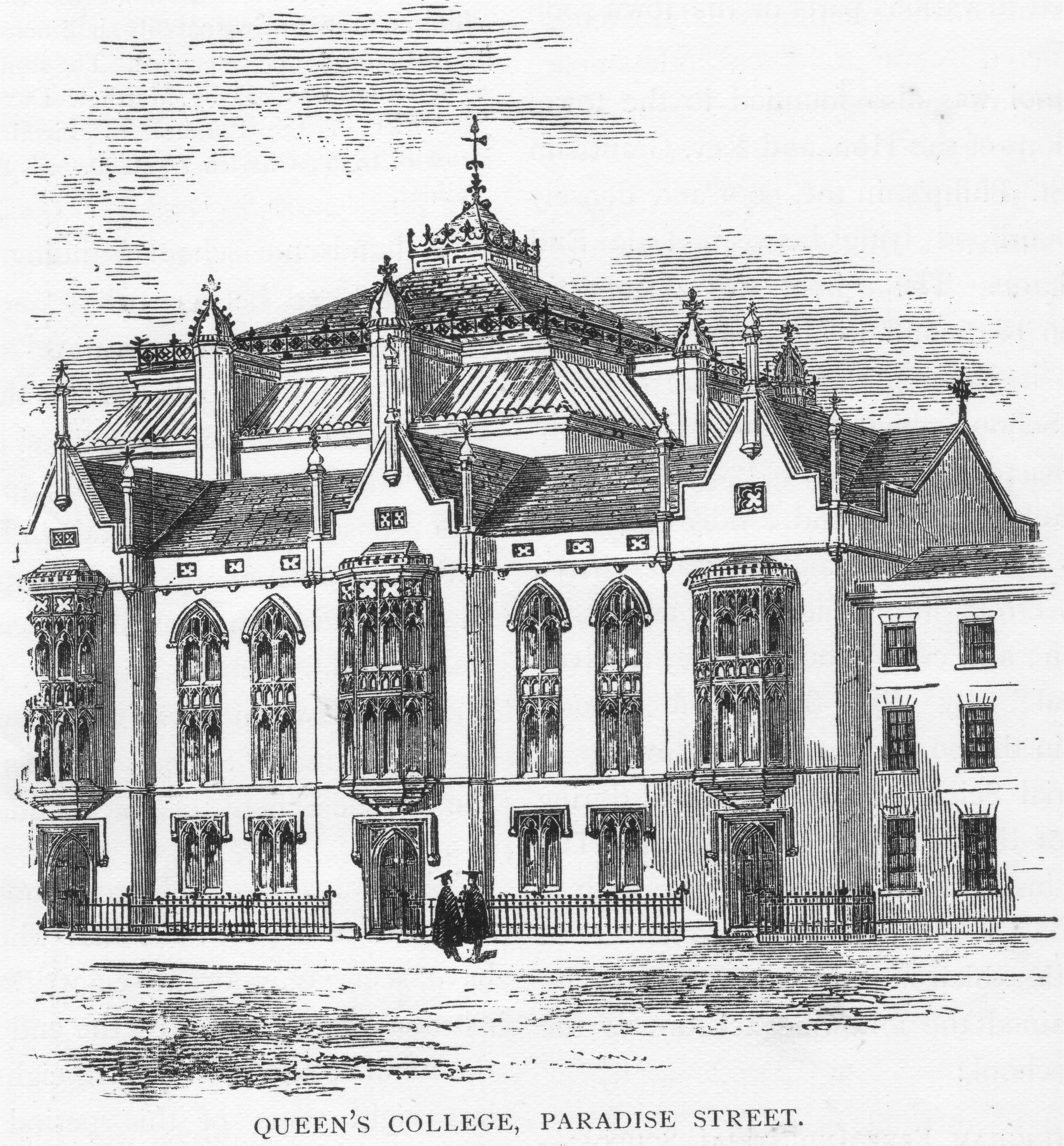
Queen's College, Birmingham, a predecessor college of the University of Birmingham

Kennedy was born in Birmingham, son of Rann Kennedy, and the younger brother of Benjamin Hall Kennedy. He was educated at King Edward's School, Birmingham, and Shrewsbury School. He studied classics at Trinity College, Cambridge, being made Pitt Scholar in 1830, and graduating as senior classic in 1831. Following graduation, he was elected fellow. He entered Lincoln's Inn, was called to the bar in 1835, became a barrister, and settled at Birmingham. From 1849 to 1856 he was professor of law at Queen's College, Birmingham (a predecessor college of Birmingham University).

In his academic role, he advised the judge Lord Denman in the important parliamentary privilege case of Stockdale v. Hansard. As counsel to Mrs Swinfen, the plaintiff in the celebrated will case Swinfen v. Swinfen (1856), he brought an action for remuneration for professional services, but the verdict given in his favour at Warwick assizes was set aside by the court of Common Pleas, on the ground that a barrister could not sue for the recovery of his fees.

== Works ==
- New Rules for Pleading (2nd ed., 1841)
- Poems, Original and Translated (1843)
- A Treatise on Annuities (1846)
- Works of Virgil, in blank verse, written in conjunction with his father (2 vols., 1850)
- Specimens of Greek and Latin Verse (1853)
- Orations of Demosthenes, translated into English, with notes, appendices, etc. (5 vols., 1841–63, in Bohn's Classical Library)
- Hannibal, a poem, part i. (1866)

== Family ==
His grandson, also named Charles Rann Kennedy (1871–1950), was a playwright and actor who married actress Edith Wynne Matthison. His older brother was classicist Benjamin Hall Kennedy.

== Sources ==
- Archbold, W. A. J. (1891) "Kennedy, Charles Rann (1808–1867)", in Lee, S. (ed.) Dictionary of National Biography
- — rev. E. Metcalfe (2004) "Kennedy, Charles Rann (1808–1867)", Oxford Dictionary of National Biography, Oxford University Press, accessed 8 February 2008 (subscription, Wikipedia Library access or UK public library membership required)
- Pue, W. W. (1990). "Moral panic at the English Bar: Paternal vs. commercial ideologies of legal practice in the 1860s". Law and Social Inquiry. 15 (1): 49–118. doi:10.1111/j.1747-4469.1990.tb00275.x. S2CID 145788677.
- Ripley, George; Dana, Charles A., eds. (1879). "Kennedy, Benjamin Hall" . The American Cyclopædia.
