= Thomas George Tucker =

Anglo-Australian academic (1859–1946)

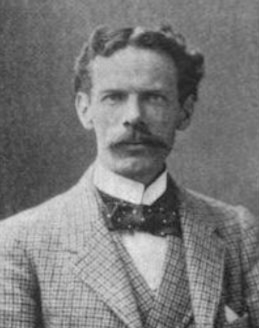
- Born: 29 March 1859; Burnham, Buckinghamshire, England
- Died: 24 January 1946 (aged 86); Stope Cove, Devon, England
- Education: Lancaster Royal Grammar School; St John's College, Cambridge
- Occupation: Academic
- Spouse: Annie Mary Muckalt (died 1933)
- Children: 3

Thomas George Tucker (29 March 1859 – 24 January 1946) was an Anglo-Australian academic, classicist, professor at the University of Melbourne and author.

== Biography ==
Tucker was born in Burnham, Buckinghamshire, England. He was educated at Lancaster Royal Grammar School during his teenage years. He was foundation scholar of St John's College, Cambridge, in 1879, Craven scholar of the university in 1881, Senior Classic, Chancellor's classical medallist, and fellow of St. John's College in 1882. He was appointed Professor of Classics and English at the new University College, Auckland, New Zealand, in 1883; and in June 1885 was elected as professor of classical philology at the University of Melbourne. In 1889 he published an important critical edition of The Supplices of Æschylus, in recognition of the merits of which work the degree of Doctor in Letters was conferred upon him by the University of Cambridge. He is a contributor to various literary and philological publications, and has collected into a volume entitled Things Worth Thinking About, a series of lectures on literature and culture previously delivered in Melbourne. A critical edition of Thucydides, Book VIII. was printed in 1892, the same year he represented Melbourne University at the Dublin University celebration.

Tucker died in Stope Cove, Devon, England, on 24 January 1946, survived by the two daughters and son of his first marriage (to Annie Mary Muckalt who died in 1933).

== Publications ==
- The "Supplices" of Aeschylus (1889)
- Things Worth Thinking About (1890)
- Thucydides, Book VIII (1892)
- The Proem to the Ideal Commonwealth of Plato (1900)
- Choephori (1901)
- Life in Ancient Athens (1907)
- Seven Against Thebes (1908)
- Introduction to the Natural History of Language (1908)
- Life in the Roman World of Nero and St Paul (1910)
- Sappho (1913)
- Platform Monologues (1914)
- Sonnets of Shakespeare's Ghost (1920) — as Gregory Thornton
- A Concise Etymological Dictionary of Latin (1931)
