= Smith Churchill =

English cricketer, clergyman and educator

Personal information
- Full name: Smith Wild Churchill
- Born: 17 May 1838; Shepshed, Leicestershire, England
- Died: 13 February 1902 (aged 63); Mapperley, Nottinghamshire, England
- Batting: Unknown

Domestic team information
- Years: Team
- 1865: Marylebone Cricket Club

Career statistics
Competition	First-class
Matches	1
Runs scored	1
Batting average	–
100s/50s	–/–
Top score	1*
Catches/stumpings	–/–
- Source: Cricinfo, 1 June 2021

Smith Wild Churchill (17 May 1838 – 13 February 1902) was an English first-class cricketer, clergyman and educator.

The son of William Churchill, he was born in May 1838 at Shepshed, Leicestershire. He was educated at Christ's Hospital, before going up to St John's College, Cambridge. After graduating from Cambridge, Churchill became an assistant master at Sherborne School, a post he held until 1868. He played first-class cricket for the Marylebone Cricket Club in 1865, playing against Sussex at Lord's. He batted twice during the match, ending both MCC innings' unbeaten on 0 and 1 respectively. Churchill took holy orders in the Anglican Church in 1868, being ordained as a deacon. In the same year he was appointed headmaster of Atherstone Grammar School in Warwickshire, where he was also the town curate. Churchill was headmaster at Athertstone until 1901, in addition to being the curate at Ratcliffe Culey, just across the county border in Leicestershire, between 1888 and 1901. He moved to Mapperley in Derbyshire during the final years of his life, where he was a vicar. Churchill died there in February 1902. He was survived by his wife, Annie.
