= Horatio Waddington =

Horatio Waddington, PC (1799 – 3 October 1867) (also known as Horace Waddington) was the Permanent Under-Secretary of State for the Home Department from 1848 to 1867.

Waddington was second son of the Rev George Waddington, vicar of Tuxford, Nottinghamshire. His brother was the priest and writer George Waddington. Waddington was educated at Charterhouse School and Trinity College, Cambridge, where he was Bell Scholar in 1817, a Scholar and Pitt Scholar in 1818, Porson Prizeman for 1819, and winner of the Chancellor's Medal and 18th wrangler in 1820. He was elected a fellow of Trinity in 1820.

A barrister, Waddington was called to the Bar by Lincoln's Inn in 1825 before joining the Midland Circuit. He was Recorder of Warwick and of Lichfield from 1838 to 1848, when Sir George Grey appointed him Permanent Under-Secretary of State for the Home Department, where he remained until 1867. He was sworn of the Privy Council in 1866.

Waddington was a member of the Royal Commission on the University of Cambridge, of the Common Law Commission of 1857, and of the Royal Commission on Capital Punishment of 1864–66.

Waddington died unmarried in London in 1867. The Waddington Scholarship at the University of Cambridge was set up by his sister in the memory of him and his brother George.
