= Herbert J. Reynolds =

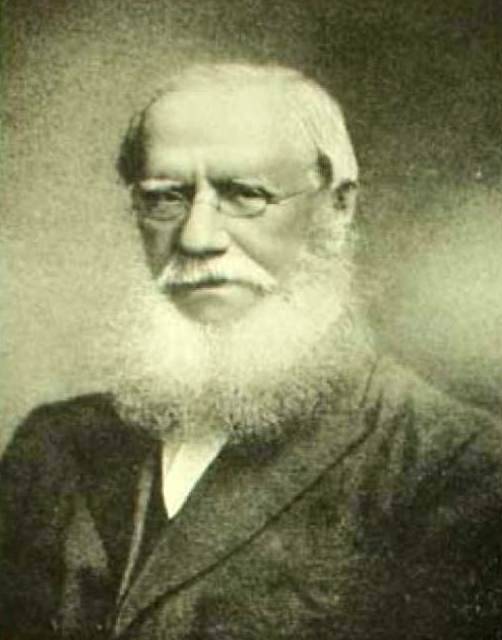
Herbert J. Reynolds

Herbert John Reynolds (1832-1916) was a member of the Indian Civil Service and the Legislative Council of Bengal. He was vice-chancellor of Calcutta University and president of the Asiatic Society of Bengal in 1883.

== Early life and family ==
Herbert Reynolds was born in 1832, the son of S. Reynolds. He was educated at Eton College and King's College, Cambridge, from where he received his BA in 1856. He was elected a fellow in 1855. He married Margaretta Catherine Waring (1835-1923), daughter of the late Henry Franks Waring of Lyme Regis, at Axminster, Devon, in 1856.

Reynolds and his wife had children:

- Rev. Charles Herbert Reynolds (Dacca, Bengal, India, 1859)
- Dr. Francis Mortimer Reynolds MB, CM, (1861)
- Henry Cecil Reynolds (Dacca, Bengal, India, 1863)
- Margaret Evelyn Reynolds (1865)
- Harvey St.John Reynolds (Midnapore, Bengal, India, 1868)
- Arthur Delaney Reynolds (Midnapore, Bengal, 1869)
- Major Sidney Latimer Reynolds (1870)
- Ida Millicent Reynolds (Dacca, Bengal, India, 1873)
- Irene Frances Reynolds (Dacca, Bengal, India, 1874)
- Juliet Amy Reynolds (1877)

== Career ==
Reynolds entered the Indian Civil Service in 1855. He was secretary to the Government of Bengal 1877-84 and a member of the Legislative Council for Bengal and the Bengal Board of Revenue.

== Later life ==
Reynolds retired from the civil service in 1889. He was president of the Asiatic Society in 1883 and an additional member of the Governor General's Council. He was vice-chancellor of Calcutta University. He was a justice of the peace.

In his later years, Reynolds lived at Southcliffe Tower, Cliff Cottage Road, Bournemouth. He died in 1916.
