= Richard Dacre Archer-Hind =

English classical scholar (1849–1910)

Richard Dacre Archer-Hind, formerly Hodgson, (1849–1910) was an English scholar of Greek and Platonism.

Born at Morris Hall, near Norham, on 18 September 1849, he came from an old Northumbrian family, being third and youngest son of Thomas Hodgson (b. 1814), who, on the death of a brother in 1869, succeeded to the estates of Stelling and Ovington and assumed the surname of Archer-Hind. The father, a learned horticulturist, graduated B.A. from Trinity College, Cambridge, in 1837 and M.A. in 1840. His wife was his first cousin, Mary Ann, second daughter of John Thomas Huntley, vicar of Kimbolton.

Richard Dacre Hodgson was taught Latin and Greek early, by his father, and when he was at Shrewsbury School, where he went in 1862, and was the pupil of Benjamin Hall Kennedy and Henry Whitehead Moss, his father continued to assist his studies. In 1868 he won an open minor scholarship at Trinity College, Cambridge, and in the following October he went into residence at the university, living with his parents, who now moved to Cambridge, as they had formerly moved to Shrewsbury, that he might have the comforts of a home life. He was elected to a college foundation scholarship in 1869 and to a Craven University scholarship in 1871. In 1872 he was placed third in the first class of the classical tripos and won the first chancellor's medal for classical learning. He was elected to a fellowship in his college in October 1873 and was appointed assistant lecturer in April 1877 and assistant tutor in December 1878. At Easter 1899 he was made a senior lecturer, and in December 1903 he retired from the staff.

During the last two years of his life Archer-Hind was an invalid. He died at Cambridge on 6 April 1910. The body was cremated at Golders Green, and the ashes were buried at Cambridge. He married on 17 March 1888 Laura, youngest daughter of Lewis Pocock. He left one son, Laurence, born in 1895.

== Work ==
Both in Latin and in Greek the exceptional quality of Archer-Hind's scholarship was recognised from the beginning of his Cambridge career. But Greek came to interest him more than Latin. At a later time, while his love of Pindar, Æschylus, and Sophocles never wavered, his admiration for Plato grew exceedingly. In 1883 he published an admirable edition of the Phædo, in which he investigated the argument of the dialogue, and traced its relations to the rest of Plato's writings. A second edition appeared in 1894. In 1888 he brought out his magnum opus, an original and complete edition of the difficult, important, and neglected Timæus, which gave a new impetus to Platonic studies. The translation is exact and scholarly; the commentary is helpful, learned, many-sided; and in the introduction Archer-Hind sets out the results of his profound study of Plato's metaphysics. His aim is to "show that in this dialogue we find, as it were, the focus to which the rays of Plato's thoughts converge, that in fact the Timæus and the Timæus alone enables us to recognise Platonism as a complete and consistent scheme of monistic idealism."

Archer-Hind's conception of the theory of ideas as "a thorough-going idealism" is the key at once to Platonic philosophy and to Platonic science. Papers in the Journal of Philology supplemented the editions of the Phædo and the Timæus.

In 1905 Archer-Hind published a volume of Translations into Greek Verse and Prose that Henry Jenner considered to be admirable.

An industrious teacher and a singularly efficient examiner, Archer-Hind took no prominent part in the affairs of the university; but his occasional allocutions at university discussions and college meetings were incisive and epigrammatic. He was always an earnest supporter of the movement for the education of women, and gave much time to the affairs of Newnham College and the instruction of its students. His literary interests were by no means limited to the classical tongues. He loved his garden, and kept an exact record of the rare plants which it contained. He took a passionate interest in music; his knowledge of certain favourite composers was intimate and minute, and had made a careful study of Greek music. (Note: [Information from Mrs. Archer-Hind, Dr. J. W. L. Glaisher and Mr. R. D. Hicks) (Note: Personal knowledge) (Note: School, college, and university records.) (Note: See Cambridge University Review, 28 April 1910 (an article by the present writer)) (Note: The Times, 8 April 1910 (obituary notice by Dr. S. H. Butcher)) (Note: Burke's Landed Gentry, s.v. Hind.])
