= Technological Educational Institute of Peloponnese =

Coordinates: 37.062°N 22.062°E

- Τεχνολογικό Εκπαιδευτικό Ίδρυμα Πελοποννήσου
- Former names: Technological Educational Institute of Kalamata
- Type: Public university system University of Applied Sciences
- Active: 1989–2019
- Undergraduates: 12,000
- Location: Kalamata, Peloponnese, Greece
- Website: www.teipel.gr

The Technological Educational Institute of Peloponnese (Greek: Τεχνολογικό Εκπαιδευτικό Ίδρυμα Πελοποννήσου; formerly Technological Educational Institute of Kalamata, Τεχνολογικό Εκπαιδευτικό Ίδρυμα Καλαμάτας, TEIKAL) was one of the 15 Technological Educational Institutes in Greece. Its main campus and administrative centre was located in Kalamata and one department was located in Sparta.

== History and departments ==
It was founded by Presidential Decree 94/1988 as an off-campus faculty of the TEI of Patras.

The first department of the faculty was the Electrical Engineering Department which started its operation in the spring semester of the academic year 1987-88. In 1989, a further Presidential Decree established the TEI of Kalamata as a separate institution, comprising two schools, further subdivided into departments:

- School of Agricultural Technology
  - Department of Crop Production, opened in the spring semester of the academic year 1989-90
  - Department of Greenhouse Crops and Floriculture, opened in the fall semester of the academic year 1993-94, renamed in 2009 as the Department of Organic Greenhouse Crops and Floriculture
- School of Management and Economy
  - Department of Health and Welfare Unit Management, opened in the spring semester of the academic year 1989-90
  - Department of Local Government, opened in the fall semester of the academic year 1993-94

Two new departments were founded in 1999, one in each School:

- The Department of Agricultural Product Technology within the School of Agricultural Technology, which began operating in the fall semester of the academic year 2000-2001
- The Department of Finance and Auditing at the School of Management and Economy, which began operating in the fall semester of the academic year 1999-2000.

Ιn 2004, the Department of Information Technology and Telecommunications was established as an off-campus department at Sparta and in 2009, the School of Health and Welfare Professions, comprising the Department of Speech Therapy.

By Law 4610/2019 the Technological Educational Institute of Western Greece was abolished and its School of Engineering was absorbed by the University of Peloponnese.

== Schools and departments ==
The "ATHENA" Reform Plan restructured Higher Education programmes in 2013.

The institute comprises four Schools, consisting of six Departments.

Schools	Departments
School of Agricultural Technology, Food Technology and Nutrition	Department of Crop Production; Department of Organic Greenhouse Crops and Floriculture; Department of Food Technology
School of Management and Economics	Department of Business Administration; Entry Track Health and Welfare Unit Management; Entry Track Local Government; Department of Accounting and Finance
School of Health and Welfare Professions	Department of Speech Therapy
School of Applied Technology	Department of Computer Engineering (Sparta)

== Academic evaluation ==
In 2016 the external evaluation committee gave TEI of Peloponnese a Positive evaluation.

An external evaluation of all academic departments in Greek universities was conducted by the Hellenic Quality Assurance and Accreditation Agency (HQA).

== See also ==
- University of Peloponnese, a university located in various towns of Peloponnese, established in 2002.
- University of Patras, a university located in Patras, established in 1964.
- List of research institutes in Greece
- List of universities in Greece
- Academic grading in Greece
- Education in Greece
