= University of Macedonia =

Public research university in Thessaloniki, Macedonia, Greece

- Πανεπιστήμιο Μακεδονίας
- Former names: University of Macedonia Economics and Socials Sciencies (in Greek: Πανεπιστήμιο Μακεδονίας Οικονομικών και Κοινωνικών Σπουδών); School of Higher Industrial Studies of Thessaloniki (in Greek: Ανώτατη Βιομηχανική Σχολή Θεσσαλονίκης)
- Motto: Ποιότητα, Αξιοκρατία, Καινοτομία (Greek); Qualitas, Meritocratia, Innovatio (Latin)
- Motto in English: Quality, Meritocracy, Innovation
- Type: Public higher education institution
- Established: 1930; 96 years ago as Evening Business School of Thessaloniki's Chamber of Commerce and Industry; 1948; 78 years ago as the Graduate School of Industrial Studies of Thessaloniki; 1957; 69 years ago as School of Higher Industrial Studies of Thessaloniki; 1990; 36 years ago as University of Macedonia
- Affiliations: EUA, IAU, BAUNAS, Black Sea Universities Network
- Budget: ▲2,390,704.60 (2024)
- Rector: Stelios Katranidis
- Faculty: 271
- Students: 19,910
- Undergraduates: 13,766
- Postgraduates: 3,340 (including doctoral students)
- Location: Thessaloniki, Macedonia, Greece; 40.6253°N 22.96°E
- Campus: Urban (approx. 40.000m^{2})
- Colours: Yellow and Blue
- Nicknames: UoM, PAMAK (ΠΑΜΑΚ), College (Κολλέγιο)
- Mascot: Lion
- Website: www.uom.gr

The University of Macedonia (UoM; Greek: Πανεπιστήμιο Μακεδονίας, ΠΑΜΑΚ, Panepistímio Makedonías, PAMAK) is a public university in Thessaloniki, Macedonia, Greece.

Founded as School of Higher Industrial Studies of Thessaloniki (in Greek: Ανώτατη Βιομηχανική Σχολή Θεσσαλονίκης, Anṓtatī Viomīchanikī́ Scholī́ Thessaloníkīs) in 1948 and started its first operation during the academic year 1957–1958, it is the second largest university in the city (following the Aristotle University of Thessaloniki). It currently consists of eight departments which deal mainly with social, political, economic sciences and Information Technology.

The language of instruction is Greek, although there are programs in foreign languages, courses both for international and local students, carried out in English, French, German, Italian, Turkish, Russian, Serbian, Bulgarian, Georgian, Albanian, Hebrew, Romanian and Arabic.

== History ==
=== Origins ===
In 1930 the evening Business School is founded by the Chamber of Commerce and Industry of Thessaloniki which can be considered the antecedent of the Graduate School of Industrial Studies of Thessaloniki. In 1948 the three-year Graduate School of Industrial Studies of Thessaloniki is founded in accordance with Emergency Law 800/1948 as a legal entity governed by private law under the authority of the Ministry of National Economy.

In 1954 the first Council of the Graduate School of Industrial Studies of Thessaloniki is established under the Ministerial Decree 70139/15-1-1954 of the minister Director- General of Northern Greece. In 1956 the "Internal Rules of Procedure of the Graduate School of Industrial Studies of Thessaloniki" got approved. The internal rules specify in detail all administrative and education matters for the organization of the School. One year later, the operation of the School starts with the admission of the first students. In 1958 the school is renamed as "School of Higher Industrial Studies of Thessaloniki", attendance is for four years, "the degree is equivalent to those provided by all four-year attendance Schools of Higher Education", operation is under the auspices of the Ministry of Industry. 4 years later, the School is governed by a Council appointed by the Ministry of Education and Religious Affairs. Thus, the School operates under the auspices of the Ministry of Education. Specializations are introduced for the first time in the school's curriculum. In 1966 the school is renamed as "School of Higher Industrial Studies of Thessaloniki" and it operates as a legal entity governed by private law. Until the issuance of the Royal Decrees provided for by the relevant Decree-Law, the School is temporarily governed by a five-member Senate. In 1973, the first PhDs are awarded. Shortly before the collapse of the dictatorship, the administrative bodies are established within the School. The school's administration is now carried out by the Rector and the Senate.

=== Contemporary history ===
In 1985, the School is divided into two departments: the Department of Economics and the Department of Business Administration. In 1990 the School of Higher Industrial Studies of Thessaloniki is renamed to “University of Macedonia Economics and Social Sciences” and three new departments are founded: Department of International and European Economic Studies, Department of Accounting and Finance, Department of Applied Informatics. 8 years later, the first Department of Educational & Social Policy is founded. The Department receives its first students in September 1997. In 1996, two new departments are founded: the Department of Balkan, Slavic and Oriental Studies, and the Department of Music Science and Art. Those new departments received their first students in September 1998. In 2004, two more decentralized departments are founded: The Department of Marketing and Operation Management based in the city of Edessa and the Department of Technology Management based in the city of Naousa.

In 2013, with the “Athena” reform plan the designation “Economics & Social Studies” is removed from the University's official title, the decentralized departments (in Naousa and Edessa) are merged with the departments based in Thessaloniki and for the first time Schools are founded. Today, the University of Macedonia has four Schools which consist of a total of eight Departments based in Thessaloniki (School of Economic and Regional Studies, School of Business Administration, School of Information Sciences and School of Social Sciences, Humanities and Arts).

== Campus ==
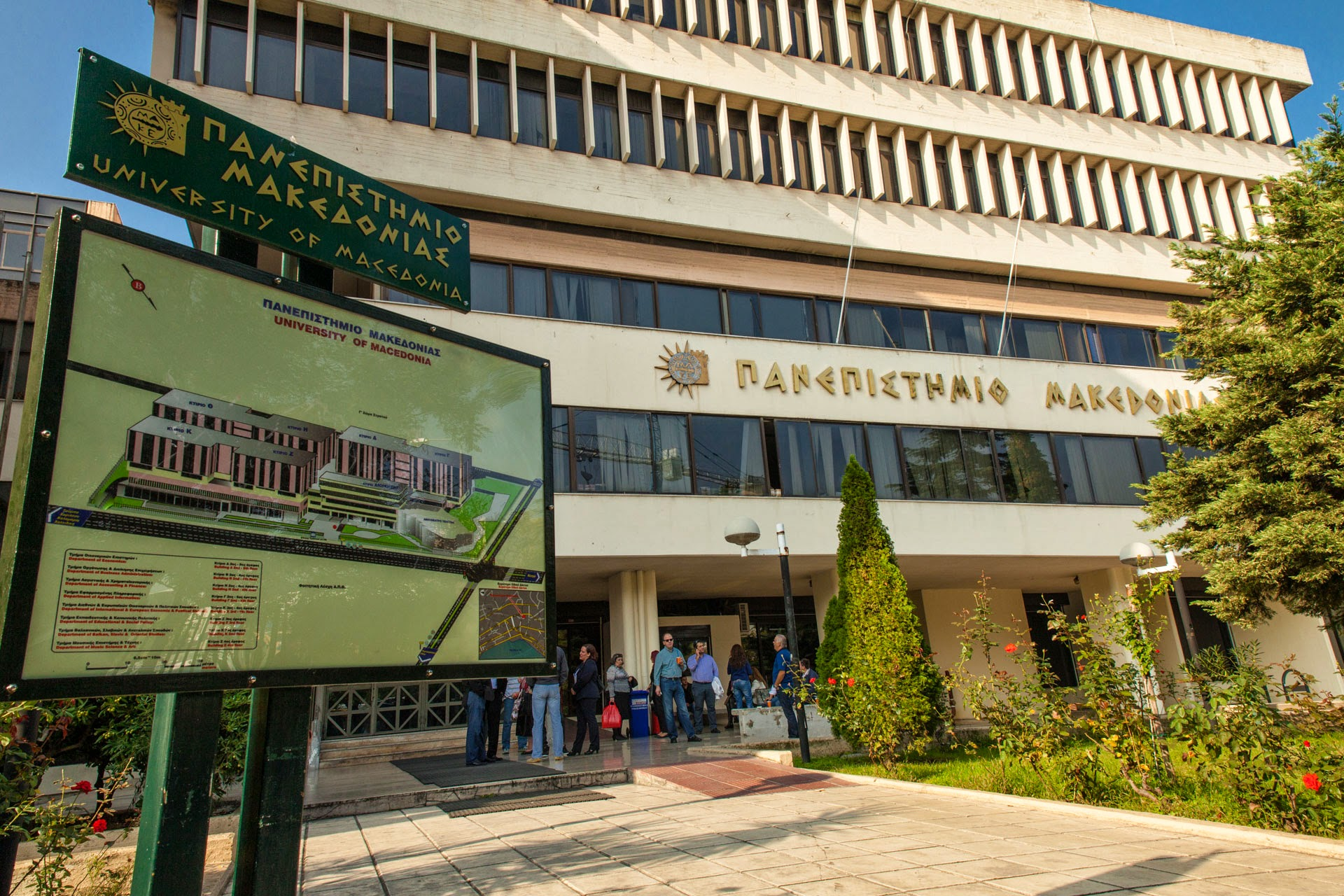
Main entrance of the University of Macedonia

The University of Macedonia is located in Thessaloniki's center, on 156 Egnatia Street. The campus is adjacent to the campus of Aristotle University and to Thessaloniki International Fair complex. It is made up of a group of buildings with a total area of approximately 40,000 m^{2}, consisting of amphitheaters, teaching and seminar rooms, offices and the areas of the administration sections, a restaurant (which operates during the whole academic year), a library, a basketball court, a gymnasium and a book-store; also a child-care station will soon be operating. There are also two guestrooms where 4–8 persons (mostly official visitors) can be accommodated.

== Administration and organization ==
The University of Macedonia is a public, non-profit university run by a four-member rectorate. The incumbent rector is Dr. Stylianos (Stelios) Katranidis.

From 2011 until 2017 the university has been administered as a public trust governed by a board of trustees known as the University Council. The powers of the Council were provided by Law 4009/2011 and among others are as follows: a) to organize the Rector's nomination procedure by selecting 3 candidates from those applying for the Rector's position elected by the University's professors and lecturers in a direct, universal and secret suffrage after an international invitation; b) to approve and update the Rules of Procedure; c) to set up the Quality Assurance Unit; d) to select the University's Secretary upon the Rector's recommendation; e) to approve the budget; f) to define the University's development strategy.

== Academics ==
=== Admissions ===
The University of Macedonia is considered one of the selective universities of Greece. Admissions are mandated by the Greek government through the Panhellenic Exams and traditionally the university had among the highest entrance marks of all Greek universities in the respective fields of study.

=== Teaching and learning ===
The University of Macedonia follows a quarter system with the autumn quarter usually beginning in late September and the spring quarter ending in mid-June. There are no academic fees for the university's graduate programmes, while the fees for its postgraduate programmes range from approximately 2,000 to 4,000 euros.

=== Schools and departments ===
The University of Macedonia is divided into four academic schools, which are further divided into eight departments.

Schools	Departments
School of Business Administration (founded 2013)	Department of Business administration (founded 1985); Department of Accounting and Finance (founded 1990)
School of Economic and Regional Studies (founded 2013)	Department of Economics (founded 1990); Department of Balkan, Slavic and Oriental Studies (founded 1998)
School of Social Sciences, Humanities and Arts (founded 2013)	Department of International and European Studies (founded 1990); Department of Educational and Social Policy (founded 1998); Department of Music Science and Art (founded 1998)
School of Information Sciences (founded 2013)	Department of Applied Informatics (founded 1992)

=== Library ===
The library of the University of Macedonia was founded in 1962 and is located in a central location inside the university's central campus. It includes study areas, public computers running Linux and Windows and photocopy machines. Its infrastructure is built entirely with open source software.

University of Macedonia also supports the development and enrichment of the Library of the Experimental School.

=== Arts ===
The university has its own performance venue, with a 2,000 seat auditorium and a stage. Its official name is the Ceremonial Amphitheatre (in Greek: Αμφιθέατρο Τελετών) and it is used for the performances of the music department, theatrical plays, as well as all the official ceremonies of the university, such as graduations. In 2012, vandals entered the space and burnt a 35,000 euro piano. The remains of the burnt piano have been turned into an artwork, a monument against violence, placed at the entrance of the space.

=== Reputation and rankings ===
According to business school ranking agency Eduniversal, the University of Macedonia is classified as a "Good Business School" and holds two Palmes of Excellence, recognizing its regional influence.

In 2016 the external evaluation committee gave University of Macedonia a Positive evaluation.

An external evaluation of all academic departments in Greek universities was conducted by the Hellenic Quality Assurance and Accreditation Agency (HQAA).

- Department of Economics (2014)
- Department of Business Administration (2010)
- Department of Accounting and Finance (2014)
- Department of International and European Studies (2014)
- Department of Balkan Slavic and Oriental Studies (2014)
- Department of Music Science and Art (2014)
- Department of Educational and Social Policy (2013)
- Department of Applied Informatics (2013)

Academic rankings

Global
- THE: 1000+

== Student life ==
=== Dormitories and student housing ===
The university has its own university residences in Nea Krini neighborhood of Kalamaria, in the south suburbs of Thessaloniki.

=== Alimentation Service ===
The university owns a university restaurant where students can have breakfast, lunch and afternoon snacks. To be served, students must indicate their alimentation card or pay if they don't have one. The alimentation card is provided to students of low-income or large families, as well as some foreign students.

=== Athletics ===
The university has its own sports indoor hall and its own gym. It is active in many sports and is taking part in university competitions in Greece. Its most successful departments are fencing and volleyball. The university's volleyball team was coached by former Greece men's national volleyball team and Iraklis VC former coach Alekos Leonis.

=== Traditions ===
According to the university's tradition, caps and gowns are worn only by members of faculty at graduation ceremonies.

=== Student groups ===
The university has a wide variety of student groups. There are political groups representing all major political currents in Greek politics, that regularly take part in student elections. There are also volunteering student groups such as a local section of Erasmus Student Network, ESN UOM Thessaloniki (the first section in Thessaloniki) active in promoting, developing and supporting the Erasmus community. and a Local Committee of AIESEC, the first one in Thessaloniki, active with promoting AIESEC's scopes.

The university also has an environmental student team doing various activities on and off campus, such as tree and flower planting.

The university hosts an active and influential Open Source Team that has made contributions to the field. Among their achievements is the development of the application my.uom.gr (github code), which serves as a vital resource for the university community. The team has also been instrumental in organizing various conferences, including the KDE Akademy 2023. In recognition of their impactful work, the open source team received the "Influential Congress of the Year" award from the Thessaloniki Convention Bureau.

=== TEDx ===
The University of Macedonia hosts an annual TEDx event since 2013 organised by students.

== Memberships and cooperations ==
University of Macedonia is currently member of the following associations/organizations:

- European University Association (EUA)
- International Association of Universities (IAU)
- International Association of University presidents (IAUP)
- Balkan Universities Association (BAU)
- Community of Mediterranean Universities (CUM)
- European Universities Continuing Education Network (EUCEN)
- Hellenic Academic Libraries Link (HEAL-Link)
- EMAS – Green University
- OLYMPIA – Summer seminars

== Notable alumni ==
- Anna Korakaki, 2016 Summer Olympics gold medal winner in the 25m pistol
- Georgios Kougioumtsidis, 2024 Summer Olympics wrestler

== See also ==
- List of universities in Greece
- List of research institutes in Greece
- Aristotle University of Thessaloniki, the largest university in the Balkans, established in 1925
- Alexander Technological Educational Institute of Thessaloniki, a technologically-oriented, applied sciencies institute, established in 1970
- International Hellenic University, a globally-oriented university also based in Thessaloniki
- Education in Greece
- Academic grading in Greece
- Balkan Universities Network
- Open access in Greece
