= Polytechnic (Greece) =

The Polytechnic (Greek: Πολυτεχνείο) is the traditional name for institutions of higher education in Greece, dealing with engineering at the undergraduate and postgraduate levels. There are currently two polytechnics that operate as independent (public) universities and five polytechnic schools that belong to universities. They consist mainly of Engineering departments and their undergraduate programs have a duration of 5 years (full-time). The legal framework of their operation is the same as that of the universities, and their graduates have equal rights with the graduates of public Greek universities. Greek polytechnics are also referred to as Technical Universities.

== Polytechnics in Greece ==
=== National Technical University of Athens ===
- School of Architectural Engineering
- School of Applied Mathematical and Physical Sciences
- School of Chemical Engineering
- School of Civil Engineering
- School of Electrical and Computer Engineering
- School of Mechanical Engineering
- School of Mining Engineering and Metallurgy
- School of Naval Architecture and Marine Engineering
- School of Rural and Surveying Engineering

=== Technical University of Crete ===
- School of Architectural Engineering
- School of Electrical and Computer Engineering
- School of Environmental Engineering
- School of Mineral Resources Engineering
- School of Production Engineering and Management

=== Polytechnic School of the University of Patras ===
- Department of Electrical and Computer Engineering
- Department of Architectural Engineering
- Department of Chemical Engineering
- Department of Civil Engineering
- Department of Computer Engineering and Informatics
- Department of Mechanical and Aeronautical Engineering
- Department of Environmental Engineering

=== Polytechnic School of the Aristotle University of Thessaloniki ===
- Department of Architecture
- Department of Chemical Engineering
- Department of Civil Engineering
- Department of Electrical and Computer Engineering
- Department of Mechanical Engineering
- Department of Rural and Surveying Engineering
- Department of Spatial Planning and Development Engineering

=== Polytechnic School of the Hellenic Mediterranean University ===
- Department of Mechanical Engineering
- Department of Electrical and Computer Engineering
- Department of Electronic Engineering

=== Polytechnic School of the University of the Aegean ===
- Department of Information and Communication Systems Engineering
- Department of Product and Systems Design Engineering
- Department of Financial and Management Engineering

=== Polytechnic School of the University of Thessaly ===
- Department of Architectural Engineering
- Department of Civil Engineering
- Department of Electrical and Computer Engineering
- Department of Mechanical Engineering
- Department of Urban Planning and Regional Development

=== Polytechnic School of the Democritus University of Thrace ===
- Department of Civil Engineering
- Department of Electrical Engineering and Computer Engineering
- Department of Environmental Engineering
- Department of Architectural Engineering
- Department of Production and Management Engineering

=== Polytechnic School of the University of Western Macedonia ===
- Department of Mechanical Engineering
- Department of Electrical and Computer Engineering
- Department of Chemical Engineering
- Department of Mineral Resources Engineering
- Department of Product & Systems Design Engineering

=== Polytechnic School of the University of Ioannina ===
- Department of Computer Science and Engineering
- Department of Architectural Engineering
- Department of Materials Science and Engineering

=== Polytechnic School of the University of West Attica ===
- Department of Informatics and Computer Engineering
- Department of Mechanical Engineering
- Department of Civil Engineering
- Department of Naval Architecture and Engineering
- Department of Electrical and Electronic Engineering
- Department of Surveying and Geoinformatics Engineering
- Department of Biomedical Engineering
- Department of Industrial Design and Production Engineering

== See also ==
- Education in Greece
- Polytechnic (United Kingdom)
- Higher Education Institutions (HEIs) in Greece
- Apolytirio Lyceum Certificate and Panhellenic examinations
