= Technological Educational Institute of Central Greece =

Public university in Lamia, Greece

- Τεχνολογικό Εκπαιδευτικό Ίδρυμα; Στερεάς Ελλάδας
- Former names: Technological Educational Institute of Lamia (1994–2013); Technological Educational Institute of Larissa in the City of Lamia (1983–1994)
- Type: Public; Higher Education; Greece University System; University of Applied Sciences
- Active: 2013–2019
- Affiliations: University of Thessaly; University of Limoges; University of Manchester
- Rector: Petros Lampsas
- Academic staff: 137
- Total staff: 250
- Students: 20000 (all campuses)
- Location: City of Lamia (main campus), Amfissa, Psachna, Thebes, Greece; 38°52′30″N 22°26′17″E
- Campus: Suburban
- Website: www.teiste.gr

The Technological Educational Institute (TEI) of Central Greece (Greek: Τεχνολογικό Εκπαιδευτικό Ίδρυμα Στερεάς Ελλάδας, ΤΕΙ) was a university founded in 2013, had a main campus 15.81 acres (0.0640 km^{2}) in the City of Lamia, Phthiotis, Central Greece, and four branch campuses. An institution of higher education of the State University System of Greece, having full self governance and functions under the supervision of the Ministry of Education, laws 2916 on 11-6-2001 and 3549 on 20-3-2007. The Technological Institute of Central Greece has abolished on 29 January 2019 and ceased to be a university in its own name status by an Act of Hellenic Parliament, Law 4589/29-1-2019. Educational departments absorbed by the Agricultural University of Athens (AUA), National and Kapodistrian University of Athens (NKUA), University of Thessaly (UTH).

It offered 4-year (full-time) undergraduate degree programs with awarded qualification πτυχίο (latinised: Ptychion), in line with the Bologna process legally equivalent to a Bachelor's degree, and 1½ years, one-and-a-half-year full-time or 3-year part-time, postgraduate degree programs with awarded qualification μεταπτυχιακό δίπλωμα ειδίκευσης, postgraduate specialised diploma, legally equivalent to a Master's degree. Postgraduate programs have statutory tuition fees. The undergraduate degree studies was previously 3½ years, three-and-a-half-year (law 1404/24-11-1983, 1983–1995) confers a legally equivalent to an Ordinary Bachelor’s degree (Ord).

The Centre of Continuing Education and Lifelong Learning (KEDIVIM; Κ.Ε.Δi.Βi.Μ.; Κέντρο Επιμόρφωσης και Δια Βίου Μάθησης), is a separate continuing and professional adult educational unit within Technological Educational Institute (TEI) of Central Greece offers Lifelong Learning short-term courses in a wide range of subjects, at non-formal education (NFE) (Greek: φορέας μη τυπικής εκπαίδευσης), although it is fully or partially regulated by the state and lead to officially recognised qualifications, with tuition fee at on-campus (instruction in the classroom) or off-campus (synchronous participation in the classroom remotely) through online live streaming by Distance e-Learning Mode mediated via real time Distance Learning Platform.

The Technological Educational Institute (TEI) of Central Greece's Centre of Continuing Education and Lifelong Learning (KEDIVIM) is certified by the National Organization for the Certification of Qualifications and Vocational Guidance (EOPPEP; Greek: Εθνικός Οργανισμός Πιστοποίησης Προσόντων και Επαγγελματικού Προσανατολισμού; Ε.Ο.Π.Π.Ε.Π.). In Greece, adult education and lifelong learning education is offered to students of all adult ages.

== History ==
In 1994, the Technological Educational Institute (TEI) of Larissa in the City of Lamia constituent campus was separated from TEI of Larissa and it founded as the TEI of Lamia, a new independent Technological Education Institution (TEI) in its own right granting its own degrees. In 2013, TEI of Lamia and the TEI of Chalkida agreed to a merger, Presidential Decree 100, Government Gazette 135/Α/5-6-2013. The founded institution was named TEI of Central Greece with the City of Lamia campus becoming the university's main campus. As the European Union determined, in October 2017 the Ministry of Education specified all TEIs will be merged with the corresponding universities and each TEI department will be absorbed by a corresponding department. On January 17, 2019 the Hellenic Parliamentary Committee Session has voted the submitting draft law on December 28, 2018 and corresponding law 4589 has been published on the Government Gazette 13/Α/29-1-2019.

The TEI of Central Greece abolished and ceased to be operated, which enrolled its final last cohort of students in fall 2018 (2018–2019 academic year). Subsequently, the Departments of Informatics, Electronic Engineering, Nursing, Physiotherapy, were incorporated into the University of Thessaly (UTH), and the TEI of Central Greece main campus in the City of Lamia was incorporated into the University of Thessaly constituent campus in the City of Lamia (that was formerly the main campus of the University of Central Greece (UCG) existed from 2003 to 2013) and became its campus part. The campus has, since the integration, been located into two parts, on the North Site and on the South Site in what has since become the main campus of the University of Thessaly in the City of Lamia. University of Thessaly in the City of Lamia, also University of Thessaly, City of Lamia (or UTH City of Lamia), is regarded as the University of Thessaly's southernmost branch campus at the time of its founding in 2013.

University of Thessaly in the City of Lamia has two sites. North Site (urban) (map coordinates: 38°54′45″N 22°25′41″E) locates at 2-4 Papasiopoulou str, 351 31, City of Lamia, Galaneika district, attached to the 16th Primary School’s building, on the outskirts of the Saint Michael and Gabriel's wooded hillside. It is 1.2 km from the city center, 300 m close to Town Hall, 5 km from South Site. South Site (suburban) (map coordinates: 38°52′30″N 22°26′17″E) locates at 3rd Km Old National Road Lamia - Athens, 351 32, City of Lamia, Nea Ampliani district, at nearby old airport. It is 4 km from the city center, in the South End suburb of the city.

University of Thessaly (UTH)
Faculties	Campuses
Faculty of Science: Department of Physics; Department of Mathematics; Department of Informatics and Telecommunications; Department of Informatics with Applications for Biomedical	City of Lamia, Phthiotis Region; City of Lamia, Phthiotis Region; City of Lamia, Phthiotis Region; City of Lamia, Phthiotis Region
Faculty of Health Sciences: Department of Physiotherapy	City of Lamia, Phthiotis Region
Graduate Programs (Master's degree-level)	Campuses
Informatics and Computational Biomedicine; Advanced Physiotherapy	City of Lamia, Phthiotis Region; City of Lamia, Phthiotis Region
Graduate Programs (Doctoral degree-level)	Campuses
Doctoral Programs for all Departments; Doctoral Programs in Physiotherapy	City of Lamia, Phthiotis Region; City of Lamia, Phthiotis Region

== Organisation ==
The academic year was divided in two semesters, a semester lasts 13 full weeks and it can be extended up to two weeks, Law 4009/2011, Government Gazette 195/A/6-9-2011. One academic year corresponds to 60 ECTS credit points (Greek: Πιστωτικές Μονάδες ΠΜ, Μονάδες Φόρτου Εργασίας). For UNESCO's ISCED International Standard Classification of Education, European Qualifications Framework (EQF), and National Qualification Framework (NQF) of Greece named Hellenic Qualification Framework (HQF), the classification of qualification level for Bachelor‛s degree (240 ECTS, Ordinary degree 210 ECTS) is at Level 6 and for Master‛s degree (90 ECTS) is at Level 7. The Senior Project has 20 ECTS. A graduate of specialty engineering disciplines only, it can hold the state-granted and approved professional title of "Licensed Engineer", when meet the criteria and pass the qualification exams by the National Engineering Accreditation Council of Greece State Department of Regulatory Authority. A professional qualification is indicated by the post-nominals LEng designation authorizes a regulation and licensure in engineering with a number of register ID license. The Technological Educational Institute engineering graduate is a technological or technologist engineer, known as engineering technologist. The Licensed Engineer LEng (registered engineer, a prerequisite licence to practicing) should not be confused with Technologist Engineer (academically qualified) which is legally regulated and limited to Technological Education Institute (TEI) graduate.

=== Specialisation semester ===
The Co-operative Education Employment-integrated Program (curricular internship) also known as specialisation semester of supervised experiential learning work (practicum). It is an off-campus undergraduate semester where the student is a trainee-in-practice has employment and practical training for 10 ECTS credits, 960 hours (8 hours a day, 5 days a week, 24 consecutive weeks) in a specialised subject of free-choice. It can also be a concentration splits into specialisations within the internship subject. TEI Internship is a government subsidy industry placement of fixed-term contract for students recruited by employers. The TEI students should find by themselves an internship term of placement. TEIs are not responsible for finding internships. The Educational Collaboration Agreement of internship is a paid CDD employment contract signed between a student (intern; student qualifies as trainee), and the co-op (cooperative) employer, accredited by the university, under the tutelage of a supervised TEI professor. It is state funded by the Workforce Employment Organisation of Greece - OAED (Greek: ΟΑΕΔ). The co-op employer must register internship student into the Social Security System, while at the internship end receives reimbursement.

=== Εxchange program ===
An exchange student is an incoming from abroad or outgoing to abroad, at an affiliated HE Institution of the TEI of Central Greece. The duration of exchange is 1 term (semester) or 1 academic year. The affiliated institution can be a partner HEI located in Erasmus partner countries through inter-institutional agreements between HEIs.

The official language of instruction at TEIs is Greek. It generally requires a B2 English language level, according to the Common European Framework of Reference for Languages (CEFR), which is equivalent to a total score of 72 in TOEFL or a total score 6 score in IELTS. Before applying to the TEICG's Erasmus Office, it needs to be nominated by student's home institution having a valid bilateral agreement between TEICG institution.

The European Health Insurance Card (EHIC) from their home countries is obligatory for Erasmus EU/EFTA students. If they do not have national health insurance in their home country (it cannot obtain the European Health Insurance Card) then have two options, they can purchase health insurance in their home countries or join the Greece National Health System. Students from any other non-EU/EFTA country must have a private health insurance. The TEI does not offer accommodation, and students have to make house arrangements by themselves. Non-EU/EFTA students must follow the visa regulations foreseen for every specific country. The TEICG has a student restaurant in its South Site where Erasmus students can have meals at a reduced price. The Erasmus Student Network (ESN) Greece is a non-profit organization for the Erasmus Student Affairs.

=== Academics ===
Technological Educational Institute of Central Greece (TEICG)
Faculties	Campuses
Faculty of Health and Welfare: Department of Nursing; Department of Physiotherapy	City of Lamia, Phthiotis Region; City of Lamia, Phthiotis Region
Faculty of Technological Applications: Department of Informatics; Department of Aircraft Engineering; Department of Electrical Engineering; Department of Electronic Engineering; Department of Automation Engineering; Department of Mechanical Engineering	City of Lamia, Phthiotis Region; Psachna, Euboea Region; Psachna, Euboea Region; City of Lamia, Phthiotis Region; Psachna, Euboea Region; Psachna, Euboea Region
Faculty of Business and Economics: Department of Marketing; Department of Logistics Management; Department of Business Administration; Department of Accounting and Finance; Department of Culture and Tourism Business Management	Amfissa, Phocis Region; Thebes, Boeotia Region; Psachna, Euboea Region; Psachna, Euboea Region; Amfissa, Phocis Region
Faculty of Agriculture Technology, Food Technology and Nutrition: Department of Forestry	Karpenisi, Evrytania Region
Graduate Programs (Master's degree-level)	Coordinated by the Departments
Advanced Physiotherapy; Ecology and Management of the Environment; Advanced Control Systems and Robotics; Design and Manufacturing of Sports Vehicle Systems; Intelligent Management of Renewable Energy System	Department of Physiotherapy; Department of Forestry; Department of Mechanical Engineering; Department of Mechanical Engineering; Department of Mechanical Engineering

== Diploma supplement ==
As part of the Bologna Process, European Commission, the Europass Diploma Supplement (Greek: Παράρτημα Διπλώματος) is issued and awarded by Higher Education Institutions (HEIs) upon graduation of a course of studies, free of charge, in both Greek and English, accredited by National Europass Centre (NEC) of Greece, the EOPPEP organisation. A Diploma Supplement (DS) is an accredited document has a standardised description of the content and status of the studies completed by its holder that are commonly easily understood, especially outside the country where they were awarded – it is not a substitute qualification for the original, nor a CV, nor guarantee recognition.
