= Technological Educational Institute of Crete =

Higher education institution based in Heraklion, Greece

Coordinates: 35.318°N 25.102°E

- Τεχνολογικό Εκπαιδευτικό Ίδρυμα Κρήτης
- Type: Public; Higher Education; Greece University System; University of Applied Sciences
- Established: 2019 – Abolished; 1983 – TEI of Crete
- Rector: Evangelos Kapetanakis
- Location: Heraklion Chania Agios Nikolaos Rethimno Siteia, Crete, Greece
- Campus: Heraklion
- Website: www.teicrete.gr

The Technological Educational Institute of Crete (TEI CRETE; Greek: Τεχνολογικό Εκπαιδευτικό Ίδρυμα Κρήτης) was founded in 1983 to provide higher technological education to the students of Greece. It is located in Heraklion and has branches in other towns of Crete, Chania, Rethymnon, Ierapetra, Sitia and Agios Nikolaos.

According to laws Ν.2916/2001, Ν.3549/2007, Ν.3685/2008, Ν.3794/2009, it is a higher educational institute (Greek: Α.Ε.Ι.) with full University status. The TEI of Crete abolished in May 2019 by law 4610, article 23, Government Gazette 70 A'/07.05.2019, and founding the newly established Hellenic Mediterranean University (HMU) in Crete (Greek: Ελληνικό Μεσογειακό Πανεπιστήμιο).

== Overview ==
TEI Crete, with its 400 teaching staff and technical and clerical staff, provides education to more than 14,500 students. Education is delivered at the base campus in Heraklion city and at five branches in towns of Crete (Chania, Rethymnon, Aghios Nicolaos, Ierapetra and Siteia). Degree Courses comprise Engineering and Informatics, Business Administration and Economics, Agriculture, Health and Welfare.

The Institute and Schools administration concentrate of the efficacy of the study programmes, learning outcomes, publicity of the degrees, successful graduate placements, the student halls and the six restaurants of the Institute. Local communities fully support the branches of the Institute and the resident students. There are opportunities for active student participation in research and development projects, for student exchanges with over 100 foreign universities and for paid work at the Institute laboratories. Graduates can also continue with Postgraduate Studies at the Institute or at cooperating Universities in Greece and abroad, with the active support of TEI Crete professors.

Spiritual, artistic and entertainment activities in and around the Institute are varied and shared by students and staff, with the financial support of TEI Crete. Personal care and advice is provided to new incoming students by the International Office and skilled staff at the Schools.

== Schools and departments ==
The university includes five Schools, consisting of fifteen Departments, to be reduced to thirteen by 2018.

Schools	Departments
School of Engineering (Heraklion)	Department of Electrical Engineering; Department of Mechanical Engineering; Department of Informatics Engineering; Department of Civil Engineering
School of Management and Economics (Heraklion)	Department of Business Administration; Department of Accounting and Finance; Department of Business Administration (Agios Nikolaos); Department of Marketing (Ierapetra)
School of Applied Sciences (Chania)	Department of Electronic Engineering; Department of Environmental and Natural Resources Engineering; Department of Music Technology and Acoustics (Rethymno)
School of Health and Welfare Services (Heraklion)	Nursing Department; Department of Social Work
School of Agriculture, Food and Nutrition	Department of Nutrition and Dietetics (Sitia); Department of Agriculture (Heraklion)

== Language of instruction ==
The language of instruction at the TEI is Greek. Therefore, a good knowledge of Greek is essential for regular students. However, special arrangements are made for a certain number of courses for Erasmus students who wish to follow regular courses. After consultation with the teaching staff, students can register for certain courses, must study from English literature, and will be given a separate examination at the end of the term. Additionally, a few courses are taught in English, and there are plans for more.

== Academic evaluation ==
In 2016 the external evaluation committee gave Agricultural University of Athens a Positive evaluation.

An external evaluation of all academic departments in Greek universities was conducted by the Hellenic Quality Assurance and Accreditation Agency (HQA).

== Erasmus ==
TEI of Crete has always welcomed foreign students, participating in all major European programmes (Socrates, Erasmus, Leonardo da Vinci, Tempus, Alpha, EC/US and others). The ECTS grading system and the Diploma Supplement (DS) have been successfully implemented in all of their Departments and facilitate the recognition of studies for both incoming and outgoing students. Today it is cooperating with more than a hundred and fifty foreign Universities and other Institutions in Europe, Asia and the United States.

== See also ==
- University of Crete / Technical University of Crete
- Technological Educational Institute (TEI)
- List of research institutes in Greece
- Academic grading in Greece
- List of universities in Greece
- Fachhochschule (FH)
- Education in Greece
