= TEI Indoor Sports Hall =

Sports arean in Crete, Greece

- Indoor Sports Hall Markos Karanastasis
- Interactive map of TEI Indoor Sports Hall
- Location: Heraklion, Crete, Greece
- Owner: Technological Educational Institute (TEI) of Crete
- Capacity: Basketball: 2,400
- Surface: Parquet

Construction
- Groundbreaking: 1999
- Opened: 2004
- Cost: €5.5 million (2004)

TEI Indoor Sports Hall, or Indoor Sports Hall Markos Karanastasis, is an indoor arena that is located in the city of Heraklion, on the island of Crete, in Greece. It is located at the Technological Educational Institute (TEI) of Crete. The arena is mainly used to host basketball games.

The seating capacity of the arena for basketball games is 2,400. The sports complex also includes locker rooms for players and coaches, administration offices, a conference room for the media and press, a medical examination room, a fitness and training facility with equipment, a 500-seat theater, and a restaurant.

== History ==
Construction work on TEI Indoor Sports Hall began in 1999, and it was completed in the year 2004. The arena hosted the Women's FIBA Diamond Ball tournament in 2004. The arena also hosted the 2009 European Universities Basketball Championships.
