= Technological Educational Institute of the Ionian Islands =

Institution of higher-education

- Τεχνολογικό Εκπαιδευτικό Ίδρυμα Ιονίων Νήσων
- Type: Public; Higher Education; Greece University System; University of Applied Sciences
- Established: 2003
- Location: Argostoli, Ionian Islands, Greece
- Website: www.teiion.gr

The Technological Educational Institute of Ionian Islands (TEI ION; Greek: Τεχνολογικό Εκπαιδευτικό Ίδρυμα (Τ.Ε.Ι.) Ιονίων Νήσων) was a fully self-governing higher-educational institute under state supervision, exercised by the Minister of National Education and Religious Affairs. The institute was based in Argostoli on the island of Kefalonia, with satellite campuses in Lixouri, Lefkada and Zakynthos. The Technological Educational Institute offered also postgraduate courses in collaboration with other universities in Greece and abroad. In 2018 the TEI of Ionian Islands merged into Ionian University.

== History ==
The Ionian Islands have a long tradition in education. The Ionian Academy was the first university of modern Greece. In 1908 Panayis Athanase Vagliano donated the Agricultural School of Argostoli and in 1915 the Vallianos Vocational School in Lixouri. In 2003 these two schools and some others in the Ionian Islands were unified to the new TEI of the Ionian Islands.

== Schools and departments ==
The university comprises four Schools and six Departments.

Schools	Departments
School of Technological Applications	Department of Digital Media and Communication; Department of Environmental Technology
School of Music Technology	Department of Sound and Musical Instruments Technology
School of Administration and Economics	Department of Business Administration
School of Agriculture Technology and Food and Nutrition Technology	Department of Food Technology

The ATHENA Reform Plan restructured the institute's departments in 2013.

The language of instruction at the TEI of Ionian Islands is Greek. Therefore, a good knowledge of Greek is essential for regular students. However, special arrangements are made for certain number of courses for Erasmus students who wish to follow regular courses. Additionally, a few courses are taught in English and there are plans for some more.

== Academic evaluation ==
In 2016 the external evaluation committee gave TEI of Ionian Islands a Positive evaluation.

An external evaluation of all academic departments in Greek universities was conducted by the Hellenic Quality Assurance and Accreditation Agency (HQA).

== See also ==
- Ionian Academy, the first Greek academic institution established in modern times (1824).
- University of Ioannina, a university located in Epirus, established in 1970.
- Ionian University, a university located in Corfu, established in 1984.
- List of research institutes in Greece
- List of universities in Greece
- Academic grading in Greece
- Education in Greece
- Ionian Islands
