= Technological Educational Institute of Epirus =

- Τεχνολογικό Εκπαιδευτικό Ίδρυμα Ηπείρου
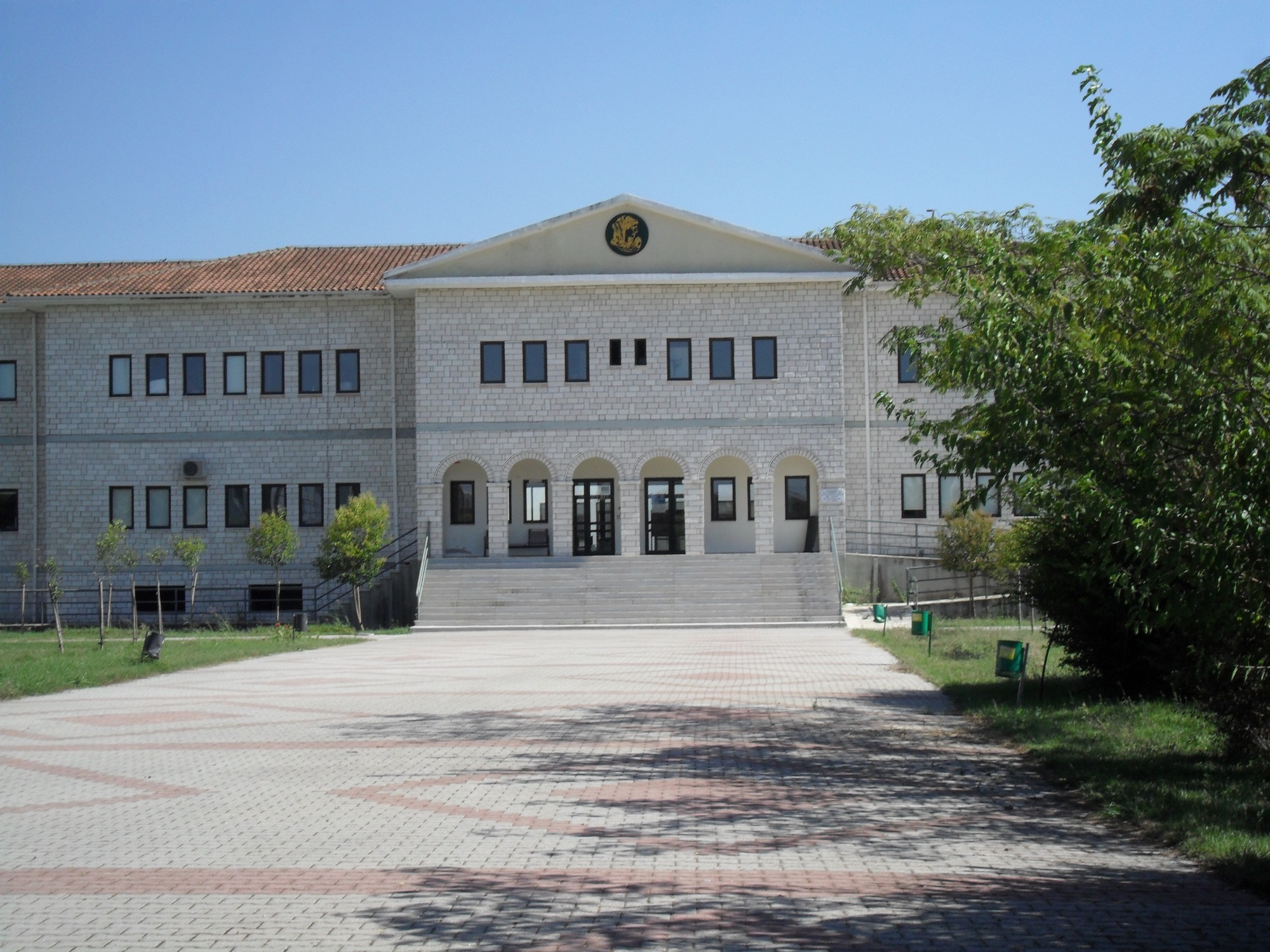
- Type: Public; Higher Education; Greece University System; University of Applied Sciences
- Established: 1994
- President: Evripidis Glavas
- Location: Arta, Greece
- Website: www.teiep.gr

The Technological Educational Institute of Epirus (TEIEP; Greek: Τεχνολογικό Εκπαιδευτικό Ίδρυμα Ηπείρου) is a higher education public institute in Epirus, Greece, founded in 1994.

Its main campus and administrative centre is in Arta and departments are also located in Ioannina, Preveza and Igoumenitsa.

== History ==
The first Schools to operate, in the academic year 1994–95, were the School of Agricultural Technology and the School of Health and Welfare Professions. The institute hosts today more than 10,000 students and it employs more than 100 members of academic and technical staff. The "ATHENA" Reform Plan restructured Higher Education programmes in 2013.

== Schools and departments ==
The institute comprises five Schools, consisting of eight Departments.

Schools	Departments
School of Agricultural Technology, Food Technology and Nutrition	Department of Agricultural Technology (Arta)
School of Health and Welfare Professions (Ioannina)	Department of Nursing; Department of Speech and Language Therapy; Department of Early Childhood Care and Education
School of Management and Economics	Department of Business Administration (Igoumenitsa); Department of Accounting and Finance (Preveza)
School of Applied Technology	Department of Computer Engineering (Arta)
School of Arts	Department of Traditional Music (Arta)

== Academic evaluation ==
In 2016 the external evaluation committee gave TEI of Epirus a Positive evaluation.

An external evaluation of all academic departments in Greek universities was conducted by the Hellenic Quality Assurance and Accreditation Agency (HQA).

== See also ==
- List of universities in Greece
- University of Ioannina
- Ionian University
- List of research institutes in Greece
- Open access in Greece
