= University of Western Macedonia =

University in Western Macedonia, Greece

Coordinates: 40.3027°N 21.7931°E

- Πανεπιστήμιο Δυτικής Μακεδονίας
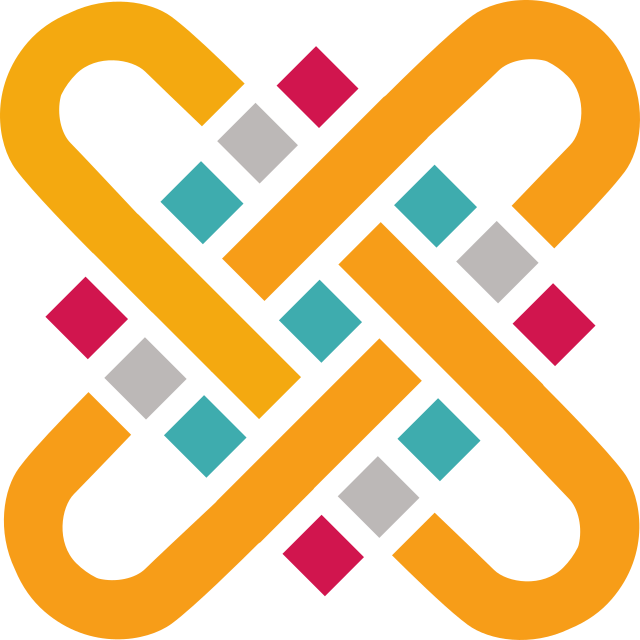
- Type: Public; Higher education Greece university system
- Established: 2003; 23 years ago
- Rector: Theodoros Theodoulidis
- Location: Kozani (main campus), Florina, Grevena, Kastoria, Ptolemaida, Greece
- Website: www.uowm.gr/en/

The University of Western Macedonia (UoWM; Greek: Πανεπιστήμιο Δυτικής Μακεδονίας, ΠΔΜ) is a multi-campus university in Western Macedonia region of Greece. It was founded in Kozani in 2003 (Presidential Decree 92/11-4-2003). The University of Western Macedonia (UoWM) operates with 7 Schools and 22 Departments, located in 5 cities (Kozani, Florina, Kastoria, Ptolemaida, Grevena) in the Region of Western Macedonia.

== History ==
The University of Western Macedonia was founded in Kozani in 2003 (Presidential Decree 92/11-4-2003). The first members of the Interim University Administration were appointed under the Ministerial Decision F 120.61/132/61865/B2/25-06-2003 of the Ministry of Education.

In 2015, after the first elections for a Rector, the University of Western Macedonia became a self-governing institution, and ran courses in 2 cities, Kozani and Florina, with 3 Schools (Education, Engineering and Fine Arts) and 6 Departments.

In 2019, the University of Western Macedonia was merged with the Technological Educational Institute of Western Macedonia (Law 4610/2019, Government Gazette 70/A/7-5-2019). The new University of Western Macedonia runs 7 Schools and 21 Departments in 5 cities (Kozani, Florina, Kastoria, Ptolemaida, and Grevena). A new campus was constructed in the Active Urban Planning Zone (ZEP) of Kozani and started operating in September 2022.

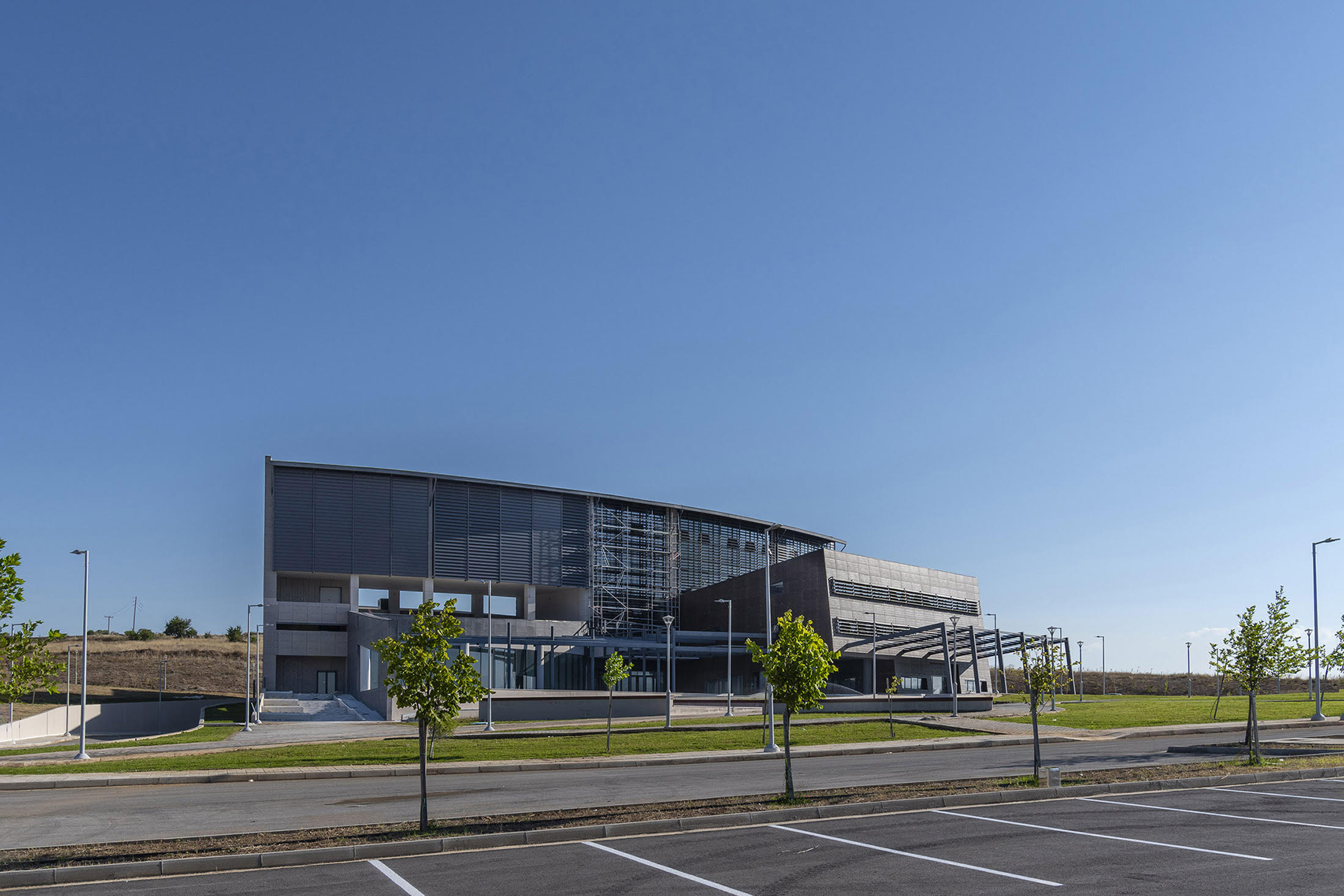
The Administration Building - New Campus in Active Urban Planning Zone (ZEP area) in Kozani

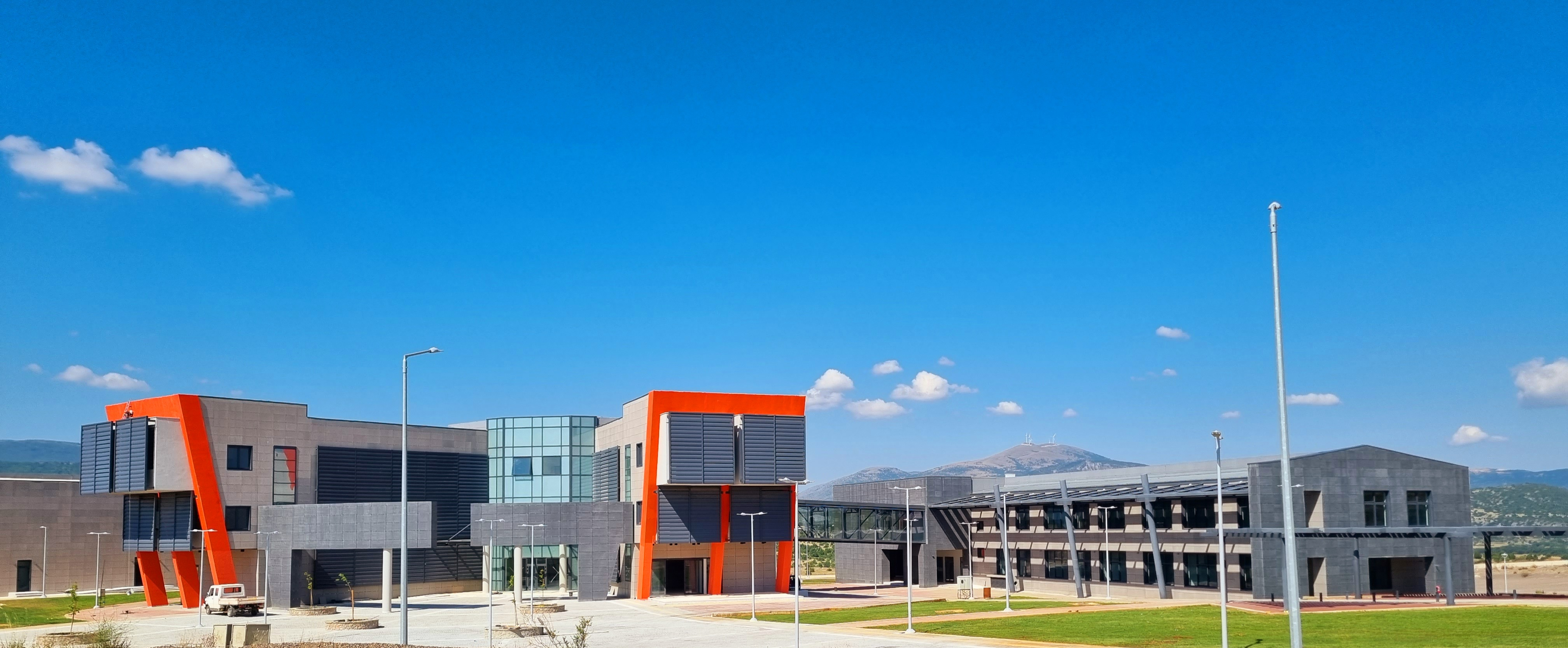
School of Engineering - New Campus in Active Urban Planning Zone (ZEP area) in Kozani

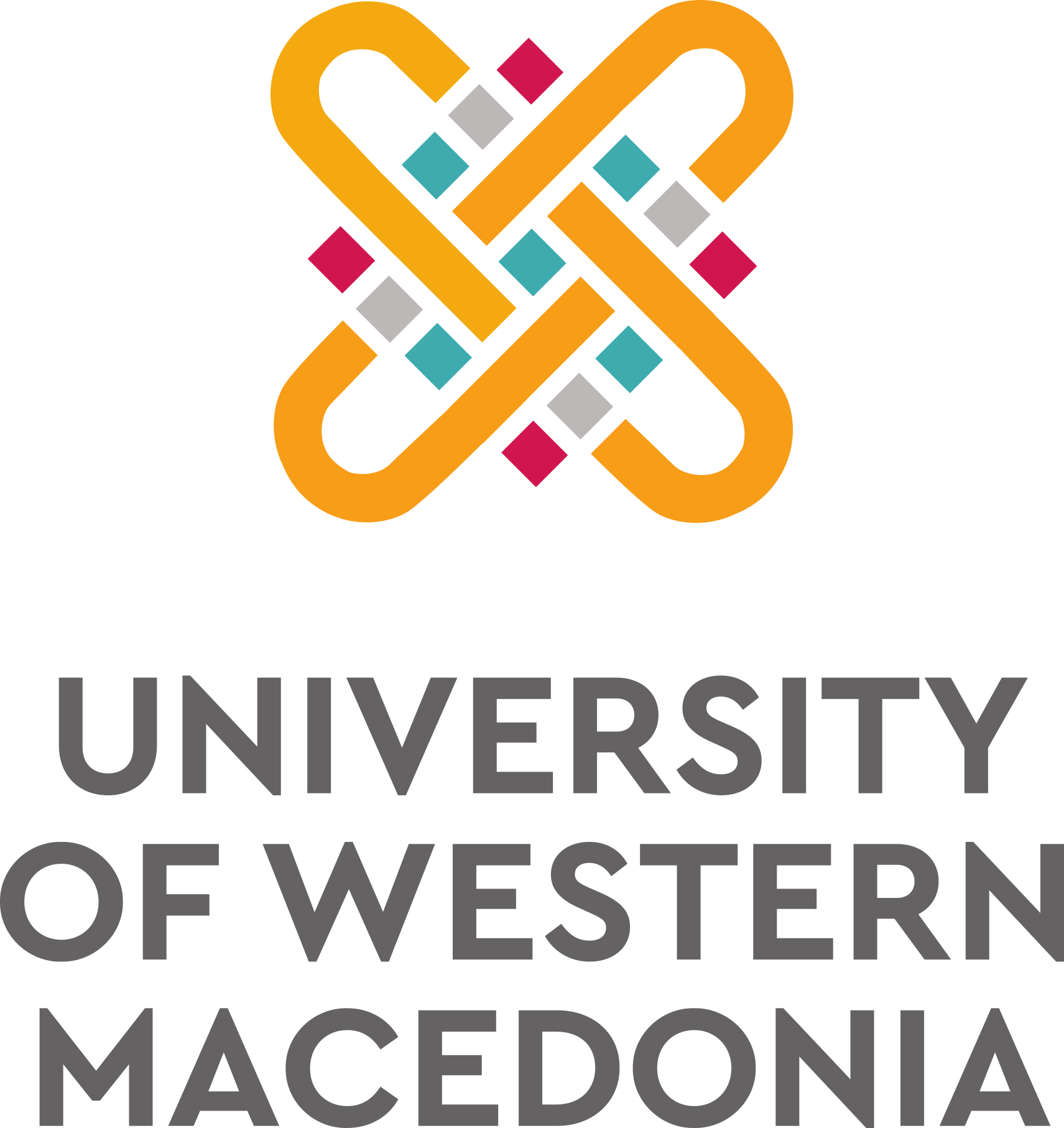

== Schools and departments ==
The new university runs 7 Schools and 21 Departments in 5 cities (Kozani, Florina, Kastoria, Ptolemaida, and Grevena) in Western Macedonia, offering undergraduate and postgraduate study programmes.

Schools	Departments
School of Engineering (also known as Polytechnic) (est. in 2013, Kozani)	Department of Mechanical Engineering (est. in 1999, Kozani); Department of Electrical and Computer Engineering (est. in 2005, Kozani); Department of Chemical Engineering (est. in 2019, Kozani); Department of Mineral Resources Engineering (est. in 2019, Kozani); Department of Product and Systems Design Engineering (est. in 2019, Kozani)
School of Humanities and Social Sciences (est. in 2019, Florina, Kastoria)	Department of Primary Education (est. in 1990, Florina); Department of Early Childhood Education (est. in 1993, Florina); Department of Psychology (est. in 2019, Florina); Department of Communication and Digital Media (est. in 2019, Kastoria)
School of Economic Sciences (est. in 2019, Kozani, Grevena, Kastoria)	Department of Management Science and Technology (est. in 2019, Kozani); Department of Accounting and Finance (est. in 2019, Kozani); Department of Business Administration (est. in 2019, Grevena); Department of Statistics and Insurance Science (est. in 2019, Grevena); Department of Economics (est. in 2019, Kastoria); Department of International & European Economic Studies (est. in 2019, Kozani)
School of Fine and Applied Arts (est. in 2006, Florina)	Department of Fine and Applied Arts (est. in 2006, Florina)
School of Agronomy (est. in 2019, Florina)	Department of Agronomy (est. in 2019, Florina)
School of Science (est. in 2019, Kastoria)	Department of Mathematics (est. in 2019, Kastoria); Department of Informatics (est. in 2019, Kastoria)
School of Health Sciences (est. in 2019, Ptolemaida)	Department of Midwifery (est. in 2009, Ptolemaida); Department of Occupational Therapy (est. in 2019, Ptolemaida)

== Research ==
Research is conducted by graduate students and members of the faculty, as well as associated researchers.

In April 2018, the students from the Hyperion Robotics team at the University of Western Macedonia presented an automated system with AI algorithms called "Cronus" claimed to be unbeatable at chess. The project took four months, the idea came from the Dean of the Polytechnic School, Professor Theodoros Theodoulides who is a chess player.

In March 2019, it was announced that the University of Western Macedonia, among 18 research institutes and companies from seven countries (Denmark, Greece, Spain, Norway, Poland, Portugal, and Switzerland), takes part in the project of European Commission's Horizon 2020 programme for research and training in 5G mobile networks, named TeamUp5G. Coordinated by UC3M, the project is being carried out, within the framework of the Marie Sklodowska-Curie Innovative Training Networks, between the year 2019 and 2022.

== Academic evaluation ==
In 2016 the external evaluation committee gave University of Western Macedonia a Positive evaluation.

An external evaluation of all academic departments in Greek universities was conducted by the Hellenic Quality Assurance and Accreditation Agency (HQA).

== See also ==
- List of universities in Greece
- List of research institutes in Greece
- Aristotle University of Thessaloniki
- University of Ioannina
- Technological Educational Institute of Western Macedonia
- Education in Greece
- Academic grading in Greece
