= University of Western Greece =

- Πανεπιστήμιο Δυτικής Ελλάδας
- Type: Public; Greece University System; Higher Education Institution
- Established: 2009
- Location: Agrinio, Greece
- Campus: Urban, suburban
- Colors
- Website: http://www.uwg.gr/

The University of Western Greece is a three-campus university located in West Greece. It was founded in 2009 in Agrinio. In September 2009, the University of Western Greece absorbed three departments that had previously formed part of the University of Ioannina. In June 2013, it was absorbed by the University of Patras. The language of instruction is Greek, although there are programs in foreign languages and courses for international students which are carried out in English, French, German, and Italian.

Independent departments:

- Environment and Natural Resources (Διαχείρισης Περιβάλλοντος και Φυσικών Πόρων)
- Business Administration, Agricultural Products and economic studies (Διοίκησης Επιχειρήσεων Αγροτικών Προϊόντων και Τροφίμων)
- Cultural Environment Management and New Technologies (Διαχείρισης Πολιτισμικού Περιβάλλοντος και Νέων Τεχνολογιών)

== History ==
The actions of the bodies of Agrinio to create academic institutions started in the 1970s, which initially led to create an Economic School in 1985. This school is administratively attached to the University of Patras and ran that way until 1996, when it moved fully to Patras. In place of this school, in 1998, two new sections were created, this time connected with the University of Ioannina. Followed by the foundation and other parts, until the decision in 2009 to establish an independent university in the city, as already envisaged by the presidential decree of 1998. The new university has allocated part of the land of the old civil airport for the creation of boarding school. Since March 2010 the university is run by a 9-member committee chaired by Professor Dimitrios Serpanos.

== Environment and Natural Resources ==
The Department of Environment and Natural Resources was established in 1998 (Presidential Decree 96/98) and began operations in Agrinio the academic year 1998–1999. In the first year of operation of the Department enrolled 67 students. In 2009, the total number of active students of the Department of Environment and Natural Resources is 618 for the first 9 years of study and 240 graduates. The total number of students during the academic year 2008–2009 was about 1,441, and introduced last year 140.O purpose of establishing and operating the new Department was the promotion of environmental science, with special emphasis on environmental management and natural resources, training of scientists able to study, investigate (academic and applied teaching and research), understand and apply modern methods to improve the protection and management of natural and human environment and knowledge of use of modern technologies for address environmental problems.

The aim of the Department is to provide a comprehensive program of undergraduate education, and in the near future and graduate education, monitor and respond both to international developments in this scientific area, and the needs and peculiarities of design problems of protection and management planning areas, and sustainable natural resource-integrated approach. Since 1999 the Department of Environment and Natural Resources is developing dynamically. It currently has a full program of undergraduate study recently adapted to modern requirements, needs of scientists who will be the managers of the environment in the future.

Minimum required length of study: 10 semesters.

== Business Administration, Agricultural Products and Economic Studies ==
The Business Administration Department of Agricultural and Food Products from renaming (PD 110/2006 Gazette 109/5-6-2006 part A) of the Department of Farm Management, founded in 1998 (Presidential Decree 96 / 98) as part of the University of Ioannina based in the city of Agrinio. Together with the Department of Environment and Natural Resources, University of Ioannina-based Agrinio again recommend the School of Natural Resources and Business at the University of Ioannina. In 1998 admitted its first students and has since continued uninterrupted operation of removing a significant upward trend guaranteed his place in the scientific map of the country.

The Business Administration Department of Agricultural and Food Products (D.E.A.P.T.) aims at educating scientists capable of dealing with rural economy, farm management, trafficking, sale of agricultural products, administration, management of manufacturing enterprises the agricultural sector and food business, economics and management of agricultural cooperatives, development of new agribusiness model, the rational utilization of rural resources to uniform regional rural development.

Minimum required length of study is ten semesters.

== Cultural Environment Management and New Technologies ==
The Cultural Department of the Environment and New Technologies (D.P.P.N.T.), University of Ioannina was founded in 2004 (Government Gazette 138/22-7-2004) and started its educational function, taking its first students in the academic year 2004–2005. It operates in the context of enlargement of Higher Education, headquartered in the town of Agrinio and mission to promote knowledge about culture and cultural heritage, promotion of information technology on culture and training of scientists skilled in modern methods of design, production, dissemination and management of cultural products and activities.

According to the PD inception, the Cultural Department of the Environment and New Technologies aims to foster and promote knowledge about cultural heritage and its management and to provide students with the necessary skills, ensuring the perfect training for scientific and careers in the subject on the cultural wealth of the country from ancient times to today, but compared with the cultures of the Mediterranean peoples.

The training provides, in particular: a) the effective promotion, promotion and exploitation of cultural resources) rational management and economic recovery in order to achieve the implementation of an integrated system for all aspects of cultural management in Greece) the emergence of the modern field of cultural management and planning with the use of new technologies.

The Department awards diplomas up to doctoral degrees. The degree awarded is determined by single and directions: -Management of Cultural Resources and -Cultural Technology.

The minimum required length of study for a degree is eight semesters.

== See also ==
- List of universities in Greece
- List of research institutes in Greece
- Education in Greece
