= Technical University of Crete =

University in Greece

Coordinates: 35.5299°N 24.0663°E

- Πολυτεχνείο Κρήτης
- Type: Public higher education institution
- Established: 1977; 49 years ago
- Affiliations: EURECA-PRO
- Rector: Konstantinos Alketas Ougrinis
- Administrative staff: 270
- Students: 3443
- Undergraduates: 2897
- Postgraduates: 546
- Location: Chania, Greece
- Campus: Kounoupidiana Campus, 7 km northeast of the city of Chania
- Nickname: TUC
- Website: www.tuc.gr

The Technical University of Crete (TUC; Greek: Πολυτεχνείο Κρήτης, Polytechneio Kritis) is a state university under the supervision of the Greek Ministry of Education which was founded in 1977 in Chania, Crete. The first students were admitted in 1984. The purpose of the institution is to conduct research, to provide under-graduate and graduate educational programs in modern engineering fields as well as to develop links with the Greek industry. It is highly ranked among the Greek technical universities in terms of research productivity, research funding, scientific publications and citation per faculty member. It uses Daedalus as part of the emblem.

== Academic structure ==
The Technical University of Crete consists of five engineering schools, all of which offer undergraduate and postgraduate study programmes. The school of Electronic and Computer Engineering was renamed to School of Electrical and Computer Engineering in July 2016.

Schools
School of Production Εngineering & Management (founded 1984)
School of Mineral Resources Engineering (founded 1987)
School of Electrical and Computer Engineering (founded 1990)
School of Chemical & Environmental Engineering (founded 1997)
School of Architecture (founded 2004)

== Research ==
The Technical University of Crete is particularly active in conducting basic and applied research such as:

School of Production Engineering and Management, focused on Technology (and how to use it for Production) and in part how to manage said technology. (Computer Aided Manufacturing, Intelligent Technological Systems, Computer Aided Design, Robotics, Environmental Engineering and Management, Dynamic Systems and Simulation, Decision Support Systems, Data Analysis and Forecasting, Financial Engineering, Management Systems, Work Safety and Cognitive Ergonomics, Applied Socioeconomic Research),

School of Electrical and Computer Engineering, focused on Programming and how Electronics function. (Distributed Multimedia Information Systems and Applications, Intelligent Systems, Software Technology and Network Applications, Electronics, Electric Circuits and Renewable Energy Sources, Microprocessor and Hardware, Automation, Information and Networks, Telecommunications, Digital Image and Signal Processing),

School of Mineral Resources Engineering, focused on Geology and how to obtain minerals. (Applied Geology, Applied Geophysics, Applied Mineralogy, Petrology and Economic Geology, Geodesy and Geomatics, Rock Mechanics, Mine Design, Solid Fuels Beneficiation and Technology, Ore Processing.)

School of Environmental Engineering, focused on Sustainability. (Liquid and Solid Waste Management, Water Resources and Coastal Engineering, Sustainable Energy, Remediation Engineering, Air Pollution, Environmental Sciences), and

School of Architecture, focused on Art and Design. (Architectural Design, Urban design and Planning, Digital Technologies in Architectural Design, History and Theory of Architecture and Art, Landscape Architecture, Visual Arts, Restoration of Buildings).

== Campus ==
The campus is located on a panoramic site in the peninsula of Akrotiri and covers an area of 750 acres (3.0 km^{2}), 7 km northeast of Chania and 1 km from Kounoupidiana. Library, IT & Communications Centre, cafeterias, sports facilities and students' dormitories are located on campus.

== Academic evaluation ==
The Technical University of Crete is among the top Greek institutions with the highest rate of research publications per faculty member.

In 2015 the external evaluation of the institution cited Technical University of Crete as Worthy of merit.

An external evaluation of all academic departments in Greek universities was recently conducted by the Hellenic Quality Assurance and Accreditation Agency (HQAA).

According to the Times Higher Education (THE) list of best Universities in the world for 2022, Technical University of Crete is among the top 1.000 in the world (place 801-1000) and among the top 600 (place 501-600) on the field of Engineering & Technology.

According to the Center for World University Rankings (CWUR), Technical University of Crete is among the top 2.000 in the world (place 1.854)for 2022.

- Department of Chemical & Environmental Engineering (2011)
- Department of Electrical & Computer Engineering (2011)
- Department of Mineral Resources Engineering (2011)
- Department of Production Engineering & Management (2012)
- Department of Architecture (2013)

== See also ==
- List of universities in Greece
- Polytechnic (Greece)
- University of Crete
- Open access in Greece
