= List of universities in Greece =

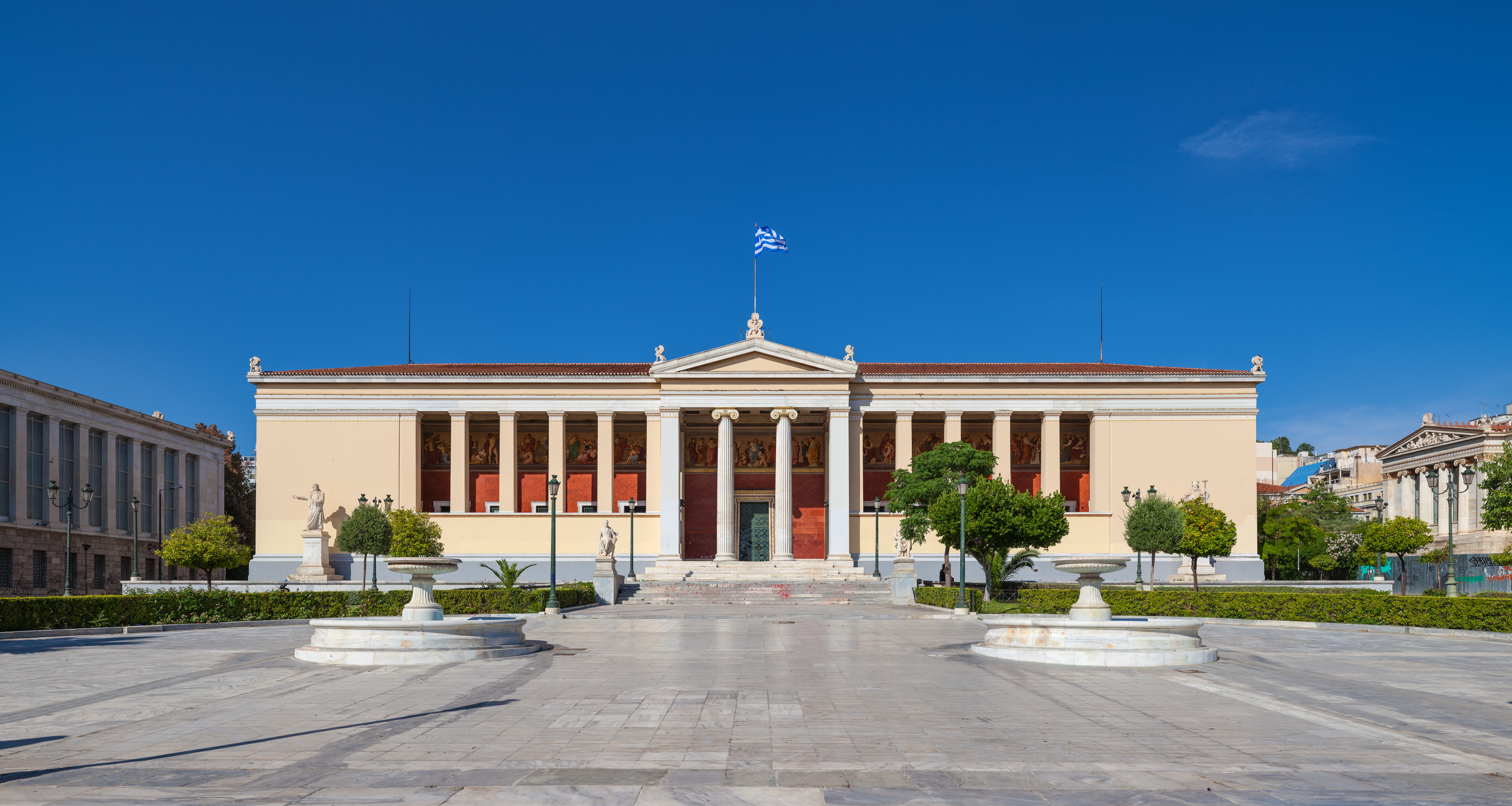
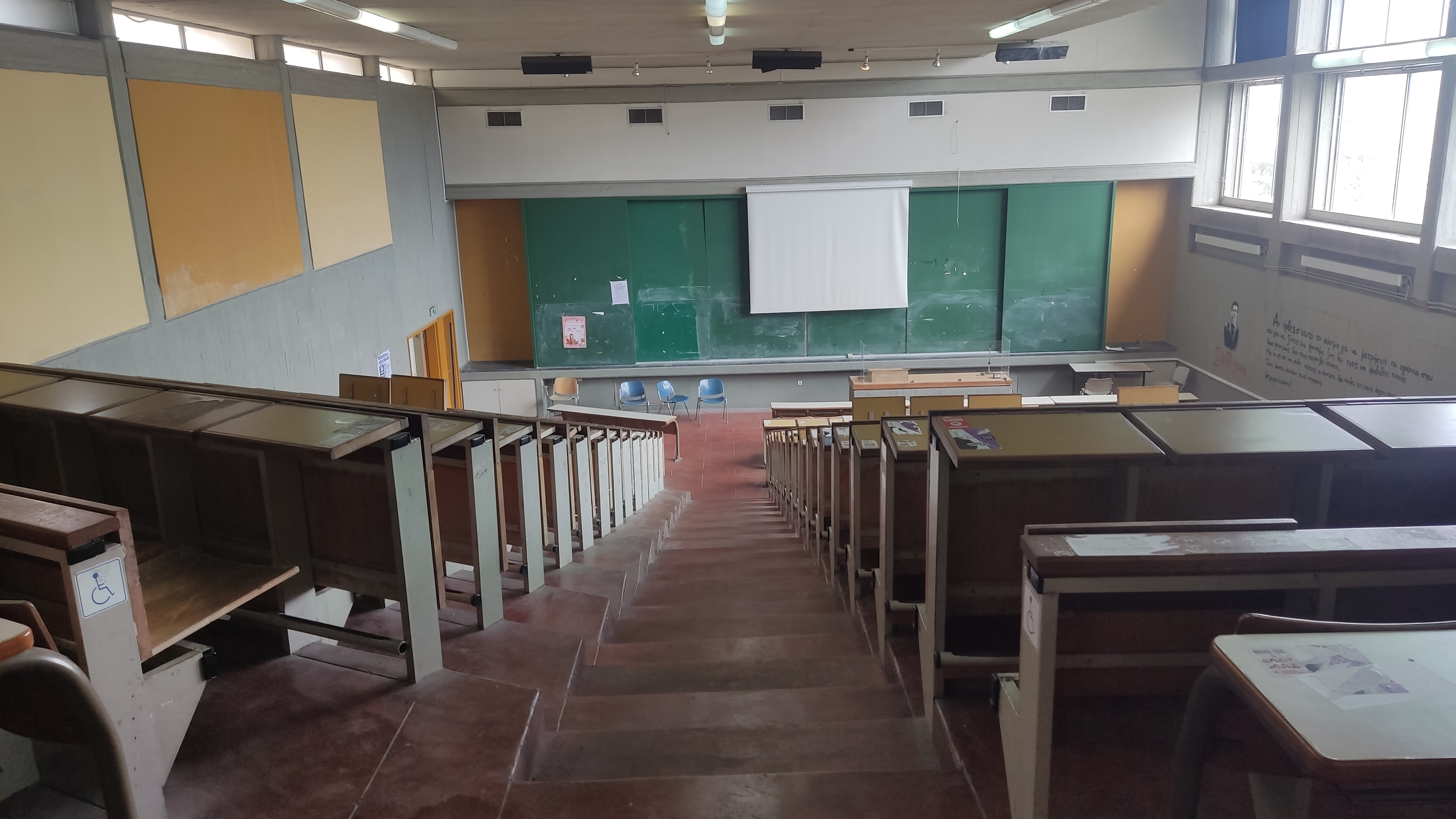
The central building of Athens University (left) and view of a typical Greek university class (right)

Universities in Greece form one part of constitutionally-recognized institutions with degree awarding powers. According to Greece's Constitution, higher education institutions (HEIs) include universities, polytechnics, some specialist HEIs, and formerly technological educational institutes (TEIs). In Greece, universities are private and public-owned and funded having state-accredited university title and authorization of university degree awarding powers at level 6 (first cycle qualification, bachelor's level) under the Bologna Process and the National Qualification Framework of Greece which is officially named Hellenic Qualification Framework (HQF; Greek: Ελληνικό Πλαίσιο Προσόντων).

The State University System of Greece operates on the term system of two semesters per academic year, has the national curriculum (national education system) set forth by the Ministry of Education of Greece (Υ.ΠΑΙ.Θ.).

== Higher education institutions ==
Public Higher Education Institutions' (HEIs; Greek: Ανώτατα Εκπαιδευτικά Ιδρύματα) undergraduate programmes in Greece are government funded and have free education without any payment of tuition fee. About one-fourth of postgraduate programmes are offered without tuition and 30% of students can be entitled to attend tuition-free postgraduate programmes after they are assessed on individual criteria. The Hellenic Qualification Framework (HQF) sets out the different levels of education qualifications and the requirements for each of these and is linked to the European Qualifications Framework (EQF), and thus to other qualifications frameworks across the European Union. The regulated framework for Greece higher education qualifications, which is tied to the HQF, covers degree-levels qualifications of Greece degree-awarding bodies and is linked to the Qualifications Framework in the European Higher Education Area (QF-EHEA) established by the Bologna process where Greece is a full member since 1999. Joining to the Bologna process Greece began education reforms in order to get higher education meeting the common European Union standards. Now the process is implemented in all higher education institutions. The programmes of EHEA are set at three levels of study which are usually referred to as the three cycle system.

First (entry level), a four-year cycle of study at EQF level 6 to attain a bachelor's degree or its equivalent (Greek: Πτυχίο; transliterated to Ptychio in dhimotiki from 1976–present; or defunct Πτυχίον; Ptychion in polytonic, katharevousa up until 1976). A second cycle of study follows at EQF level 7 lasting one or two years to attain a master's degree (Greek: μεταπτυχιακό δίπλωμα ειδίκευσης (Μ.Δ.Ε.), lit. 'postgraduate specialized diploma', also known as: δίπλωμα μεταπτυχιακών σπουδών (Δ.Μ.Σ.), 'diploma of postgraduate studies') or equivalent, which is distinguished from a postgraduate diploma, typically having 120 ECTS, as opposed to a full master's degree which usually has 180. The third cycle of study at EQF level 8, lasting three years, awards a doctoral degree (Greek: διδακτορικό δίπλωμα) or equivalent.

With the law 5094/2024, Government Gazette 39/A/13-3-2024, the establishment and operation of private ("non-state")Higher Education Institutions (HEIs) was permitted. A fully-recognized private Higher Education Institution must obtain a Higher Education Accreditation by the National (Hellenic) Authority for Higher Education (HAHE) and an official establishment and operating license by the Greek Ministry of Education. Such HEIs are yet to be accredited and established.

The Open Courses are undergraduate and graduate courses taught in Greek Public Higher Education Institutions (HEIs) that are free of cost, freely accessible and freely available to any person over the Internet (online). It operated by the Greek Academic Network (GUnet), also known as Greek Universities Network (GUnet), a member of the Open Education Global (OE Global).

With the paragraph 10 of article 34 of the Law 2725/15-6-1999, Government Gazette 121/A/17-6-1999, high school graduate athletes from 17 to 30-year-old who hold specific sport achievements are admitted without entrance Panhellenic Examinations to anyone of their choice undergraduate department of the public Higher Education Institutions of Greece.

== Universities and technical universities ==
Universities (Greek: Πανεπιστήμια) can grant one or more of bachelor's, master's, integrated master's and doctorate degrees. The undergraduate programme of study for most disciplines is four years with awarded qualification in line with the Bologna process legal equivalent to a bachelor's degree, 240 ECTS, at level 6 of Greece's National Qualification Framework (NQF), European Qualifications Framework (EQF), or International Standard Classification of Education (ISCED).

Technical universities, also known as polytechnics (Greek: Πολυτεχνεία), grant degrees at the integrated master's level (which is divided into a 3-year undergraduate degree qualification and a 2-year postgraduate one), master's, and doctorate level. In specific disciplines, only the undergraduate programme is five years with awarded qualification (Greek: Δίπλωμα, Latinised version: Diploma) that is legally equivalent to an integrated master's degree, which is often the standard route to chartered status for a regulated profession in Greece. The integrated master's degree is a specialized degree corresponding to a master-level degree which has integrated part of an undergraduate degree. It is also called an undergraduate master's degree, where instead of studying for two separate degrees, a student will study for a single, longer programme. A student can also be awarded the 3-year undergraduate qualification (180 ECTS), instead of pursuing the masters should he wishes to. The most common integrated master's is in engineering, for example a Dipl.-Eng or Dip.Arch.Eng/M.Arch, and also others along with some programmes in the fine arts.

In medical schools, six years of studying are required to earn a bachelor's degree.

In addition to earning an academic degree in specific disciplines only, state license is required to practice independently within the country of Greece, and some disciplines have further licensing requirements to bestow a recognized appellation (chartered accountant, attorney at law, doctor of medicine, etc.). Diploma is a prerequisite for registration as a chartered professional, so it is also known as professional degree. The use of specific professional titles for some professions is legally regulated. For a regulated profession, access to professional practice requires holding a particular specific degree (e.g. professional degree), taken special exams that are required to earn state practice credential such as it must pass the National Council Licensure Examination, a period of practical training under supervision similar to internship, and/or registration with a professional body.

Universities and technical universities
University	Campuses
Athens University of Economics and Business	Athens
Aristotle University of Thessaloniki	Thessaloniki (main), Serres
University of West Attica (formerly TEI of Athens and TEI of Piraeus)	Athens
Agricultural University of Athens	Athens (main), Amfissa, Karpenisi, Thebes
Athens School of Fine Arts	Agios Ioannis Rentis, Athens
Democritus University of Thrace	Komotini (main), Alexandroupoli, Orestiada, Xanthi, Didymoteicho, Drama, Kavala
Harokopio University of Athens	Kallithea, Athens
National Technical University of Athens	Athens
National and Kapodistrian University of Athens	Athens (main), Dafni, Attica, Psachna
Hellenic Mediterranean University	Heraklion (main), Chania, Rethymno, Agios Nikolaos, Crete, Sitia
Hellenic Open University	Patras
International Hellenic University	Thessaloniki (main), Edessa, Katerini, Kilkis, Serres
Ionian University	Corfu (main), Argostoli, Zakynthos, Lefkada, Lixouri
Panteion University	Kallithea, Athens
Technical University of Crete	Chania
University of the Aegean	Mytilene (main), Chios, Ermoupoli, Karlovasi, Myrina, Rhodes
University of Crete	Rethymno (main), Heraklio
University of Ioannina	Ioannina (main), Arta, Preveza
University of Macedonia	Thessaloniki
University of Patras	Patras (main), Agrinio, Messolongi
University of Peloponnese	Tripoli (main), Corinth , Kalamata, Nafplio, Patras, Sparta
University of Piraeus	Piraeus, Athens
University of Thessaly	Volos (main), Larissa, Lamia, Karditsa, Trikala
University of Western Macedonia	Kozani (main), Florina, Grevena, Kastoria, Ptolemaida
School of Pedagogical and Technological Education (ASPETE)	Marousi, Athens

== International programmes ==
With the law 4692/2020, Part II, Chapter III, from Article 82 to Article 95, the Greek Higher Education Institutions (HEIs) can provide first cycle programmes of studies in a language other than Greek. Among the Greek universities offer English-taught full-time programmes with tuition are:

- National and Kapodistrian University of Athens, 4-year undergraduate programme in Archaeology, History, and Literature of Ancient Greece.
- National and Kapodistrian University of Athens, School of Medicine 6-year undergraduate programme.
- Aristotle University of Thessaloniki, School of Medicine 6-year undergraduate programme for international students.
- University of Thessaly, School of Health Sciences, Faculty of Medicine, Medical Degree 6-year undergraduate programme.
- University of Crete, School of Medicine 6-year undergraduate programme for international students.
- University of Patras, School of Medicine 6-year undergraduate programme.
- International Hellenic University, University Center of International Programmes of Studies (UCIPS), offers English-taught postgraduate programmes.
- University of Macedonia, School of Business Administration, Department of Accounting and Finance, 4-year undergraduate programme in Accounting and Finance.
- University of Western Macedonia, School of Economic Sciences, Department of Economics, 4-year undergraduate programme in Economics and Sustainable Development.
- University of Western Macedonia, School of Social Sciences and Humanities, Department of Early Childhood Education, 4-year undergraduate programme in Creative Writing, Arts, and Humanities.
- Athens University of Economics and Business, 4-year undergraduate programme in International Business and Technology.
- Hellenic Open University offers English-taught, French-taught and German-taught postgraduate programmes, Spanish-taught undergraduate programmes.

== University rankings in Greece ==
An external evaluation of all Greek universities was conducted by the Hellenic Quality Assurance and Accreditation Agency (HQA).

The following universities rank in at least one of the four major global rankings:

University	QS World	THE World
Aristotle University of Thessaloniki	▲530	801–1000
National Technical University of Athens	▲341	▲601 - 800
University of Patras	▲731 - 800	801–1000
National and Kapodistrian University of Athens	▲444	▼501 - 600
University of Crete	▲534	▲501 - 600
Technical University of Crete	1401	▼1200 - 1500
University of the Aegean		801–1000
University of Ioannina	1001 - 1200	▼1001 - 1200
University of Thessaly		801–1000
Athens University of Economics and Business	▲901 - 950	801–1000
Democritus University of Thrace		▲1001 - 1200
Hellenic Open University		▼1500+

== Technological educational institutes ==
Technological educational institutes (TEIs; Greek: Τεχνολογικά Εκπαιδευτικά Ιδρύματα) was a classification of Greek public HEIs (government subsidised) from 1983 to 2019, also called Technological Educational Institutes (TEIs) of Higher Education, Technological Institutes, Institutes of Technology, Technological Universities, and rarely Technical Colleges.

The undergraduate degree programmes, which by default included a one-time, 960 hours-long internship term known as practical training semester, consisted of four years and 240 ECTS-credits, previously a 3 1/2-year (law 1404/24-11-1983, 1983–1995) and 210 ECTS, in line with the Bologna Process equivalent to a Level 6 ISCED bachelor's degree; the postgraduate degree programmes were 1 1/2 years full-time or three years part-time with 90 credits and awarded qualification equivalent to a master's degree, ISCED 7. All TEIs in Greece were reformed between 2013 and 2019 and their departments have been incorporated into existing Higher Education Institutions.

== Former HEIs ==
HEIs are defunct due to either closure or merger. Such events include:

The progressive education reforms of the "ATHENA" reform plan restructured higher education from 2013 to 2019.

- University of Central Greece, abolished in June 2013 and absorbed into the University of Thessaly (UTH) and Panteion University
- University of Western Greece, abolished in June 2013 and absorbed into the University of Patras

Mergers of TEIs in 2018–2019:

- TEI of Thessaloniki, TEI of Eastern Macedonia and Thrace (TEI of Kavala), and TEI of Central Macedonia (TEI of Serres), merged with the International Hellenic University in 2019
- TEI of Athens and TEI of Piraeus, merged in 2018 to form the University of West Attica with three campuses in Aigaleo municipality in Athens
- TEI of Crete, abolished in May 2019, founding the new Hellenic Mediterranean University
- TEI of Central Greece, a merger of TEI of Chalkida and TEI of Lamia, abolished in 2019 and absorbed by the National and Kapodistrian University of Athens, the Agricultural University of Athens, and the University of Thessaly
- TEI of Ionian Islands, merged with Ionian University in 2018
- TEI of Thessaly, abolished in 2019 and absorbed by the University of Thessaly
- TEI of Epirus, merged with the University of Ioannina in 2018
- TEI of Western Macedonia (TEI of Kozani), merged with the University of Western Macedonia in 2019
- TEI of Western Greece, a merger of two TEIs in Patras and Mesolonghi, merged with the University of Patras and the University of Peloponnese in 2019
- TEI of Peloponnese (TEI of Kalamata), merged with University of Peloponnese in 2019

== Specialist HEIs ==
- Hellenic Coast Guard Officers School
- Hellenic Police Officers School
- Hellenic Fire Service Officers School

Military HEIs offer undergraduate programs which lead to a bachelor's degree-level in military studies, have been called Higher Military Education Institutions (ASEI; Greek: Ανώτατα Στρατιωτικά Εκπαιδευτικά Ιδρύματα). Since 2010, they have offered studies for master's degree-level specialized diplomas and doctoral degrees. They conduct officer training for the Hellenic Armed Forces and have been considered national defense universities since 1961. Students at all Military Forces Academies are referred to as cadets and receive a monthly stipend during education. All cadets reside on campus and receive meals in dining halls. Cadets are not referred to as freshmen, sophomores, juniors, or seniors but instead fourth class, third class, second class, and first class cadets, respectively. All foreign cadets are commissioned into the military forces of their home countries. Upon graduation, all cadets become commissioned as second lieutenants, entry-level rank, and are employed in the Hellenic Armed Forces for a compulsory minimum term of duty service.

- Hellenic Military Academy (Evelpidon Military Academy)
- Hellenic Naval Academy (Hellenic Naval Cadets Academy)
- Hellenic Air Force Academy (Icarus Air Force Academy)
- Hellenic Military Academy of Combat Support Officers, with programs in Economy, Dentistry, Legal Advisors, Medical, Pharmacy, Psychology, Veterinary Medicine - cadets follow Aristotle University of Thessaloniki programs.

And, following their upgrade as per the provisions of Law 5265/2026, formerly Higher Military Schools for Non-Commissioned Officers (ΑΣΣΥ), now renamed Higher Permanent NCO Academies (ΑΣΜΥ), will also offer undergraduate programmes starting in 2027:

- Military Non-commissioned Officers' Academy (ΣΜΥ).
- Air Force Non-commissioned Officers' Academy (ΣΜΥΑ).
- Naval Non-commissioned Officers' Academy (ΣΜΥΝ).

== Non-HEIs ==
After the law 5094/13-3-2024 published on Government Gazette 39/A/13-3-2024 permits in Greece the establishment and operation of private Higher Education Institutions (HEIs). Before the law 5094/13-3-2024 it was prohibited the operation of private Higher Education Institutions (HEIs).

In Greece, there are also the private colleges which are not considered universities and are not recognized as HEIs or degree-awarding bodies by the Greek government. The Post-secondary Education Centres (Greek: Κέντρα Μεταλυκειακής Εκπαίδευσης; ΚΕΜΕ) accredited by the Ministry of Education to which the Private Colleges belong, also they can be called Post-secondary Colleges (non-tertiary), they are bodies of non-typical education (φορείς μη τυπικής εκπαίδευσης) known as non-formal education bodies. According to the State Constitution of Greece, "education at university level must be provided exclusively by institutions which are fully self-governed public law legal bodies". This prohibits private companies from operating post-secondary education that provides studies at Level 6 and higher on the Greek Qualifications Framework. However, it does not prohibit colleges from collaborating in Greece with foreign universities to offer undergraduate and postgraduate programmes.

The Panhellenic Association of Recognised Colleges (Greek: Πανελλήνια Ένωση Αναγνωρισμένων Κολλεγίων) is the representative body for the Greece located recognised private colleges. All the private colleges located in Greece are for-profit. Generally, any individual who wants to found a college in Greece must obtain a Higher Education Accreditation by the National (Hellenic) Authority for Higher Education (HAHE) and a license by the Ministry of Education, but has no obligation to become a participatory member of HCA. The vast majority of colleges are offering programmes of study under franchise or validation agreements with universities established in other European Union countries, primarily in the UK, leading to degrees which are awarded directly by those universities. The monitoring of those agreements as well as of additional provisions for the operation of colleges is carried out by the Ministry of Education and confirmed by Parliament by a 2008 law. Amendments were passed in 2010, 2012, 2013, and 2014. They are also monitored by the respective educational authorities of the countries of the partnered universities, for example QAA and NARIC for a British university.

One example of a college which neither operating as a franchise nor was validated through arrangements in the UK was the University of Indianapolis – Athens Campus, which ceased operations in July 2014. By contrast, this college was wholly owned and operated by its home campus, and is therefore accredited by the same agency which accredits the home campus. Consequently, students of the University of Indianapolis could switch between campuses at any time.

Degrees, diplomas, certificates, and any other type of attestation awarded by universities in European Union and European Free Trade Association countries to students that have completed their studies in an accredited private college located in Greece, can be recognized as professionally equivalent "in terms of the professional (practice) rights only" (Greek: επαγγελματικής ισοδυναμίας) to higher education titles awarded in the formal Greek education system. Recognition of professional equivalence permits access to a specific economic activity that the title-holder can exercise on the same rules, rights, terms as holders of comparable titles of Greece HEIs education system.

Recognition of legally-recognized professional degree rights in Greece can only be granted by the Independent Department of Implementation of European Legislation (ATEEN; Αυτοτελές Τμήμα Εφαρμογής Ευρωπαϊκής Νομοθεσίας; Α.Τ.Ε.Ε.Ν.) of the Ministry of Education (Υ.ΠΑΙ.Θ.), as of the 2005 Directive of the European Parliament and Council, implemented domestically by a presidential decree in 2010.

Higher Education qualifications obtained from abroad foreign countries are recognised by the Interdisciplinary Organisation of Recognition Academic Titles and Information (D.O.A.T.A.P.; Greek: Διεπιστημονικός Οργανισμός Αναγνώρισης Τίτλων Ακαδημαϊκών και Πληροφόρησης; Δ.Ο.Α.Τ.Α.Π.) supervised by the Ministry of Education (Υ.ΠΑΙ.Θ.). The Hellenic National Academic Recognition and Information Center (Hellenic NARIC) is the official international name of DOATAP. In most cases, it can obtain a "statement of comparability" of a qualification (certificate of qualification equivalency information), stating how it compares to the qualifications delivered in Greece.

== HAHE authority ==
The Hellenic Quality Assurance and Accreditation Agency for Higher Education (ADIP; Greek: Αρχή Διασφάλισης και Πιστοποίησης της Ποιότητας στην Ανώτατη Εκπαίδευση, ΑΔΙΠ), established by law 3374/2005, keeps the competent bodies of the state and the HEIs informed on current international developments and relevant issues. The ADIP was reformed by law 4653/2020 to form the Hellenic (National) Authority for Higher Education (HAHE; Greek: Εθνική Αρχή Ανώτατης Εκπαίδευσης; ΕΘ.Α.Α.Ε.). At the end of each year, a Higher Education Quality Report is submitted to the Minister of Education. A "Quality Assurance Unit" (QAU) is established in every HEI in order to coordinate and support evaluation procedures. QAU meetings are chaired by the Vice-Rector or vice-president of Academic Affairs of the relevant HEI and representatives of the staff and students take part in the QAU.

The internal evaluation is carried out with the responsibility of each academic unit (faculty or department) in cooperation with the Quality Assurance Unit. The academic units appoint Internal Evaluation Groups or Special Evaluation Groups (if undergraduate or postgraduate programmes are separately evaluated) and these groups compile the Internal Evaluation Report and submit it to the Quality Assurance Unit of the institution. The external evaluation process is repeated at longest every four years with the cooperation of HEIs and the HAHE. The evaluation is carried out by the External Evaluation Committee, which consists of five members from an HAHE register of independent experts.

== See also ==
- List of colleges and universities by country
- List of universities and colleges in Cyprus
- List of research institutes in Greece
- Outline of academic disciplines
- State School (publicly funded)
- Academic grading in Greece
- Open access in Greece
- Education in Greece
- Private university
