= Apolytirion =

Main school-leaving certificate for secondary education in Greece and Cyprus

Apolytirio (Greek: Απολυτήριο in Dimotiki from 1976–present; known as Apolytirion, Απολυτήριον, in Katharevousa until 1976) is the official senior secondary education school completion certificate (graduation qualification) in Greece (and Cyprus) obtained after successfully completing the third grade of lyceum (high school). It is graded on a 20-point scale.

Specific conditions and rules apply to each type of lyceum in the Pan-Hellenic Examinations, based on subjects that are the same as or related to those of the General Lyceum. For example, the Vocational Lyceum (EPAL) has its own set of four examination subjects. Each type of school follows a different curriculum.

== Types ==
The types of Apolytirio in Greece are:

- Apolytirio from High School (GEL) in a. Humanities and Social Sciences, b. Sciences and Health Sciences and c. Economic and Computer Studies - awarded by Geniko Lykeio, Protypo Geniko Lykeio and Peiramatiko Geniko Lykeio.
- Apolytirio from Vocational High School (EPAL) in a. Structural Works, Environment and Architectural Design, b. Αgriculture, Food and Environment, c. Business Administration and Economics, d. Applied Arts, e. Electrical Engineering, Electronics and Automation, f. Mechanical Engineering, g. Maritime Professionals, h. Information Technology and i. Health, Welfare and Wellbeing - awarded by Epangelmatiko Lykeio και Protypo Epangelmatiko Lykeio.
- Apolytirio from Musical High School - awarded by Mousiko Lykeio.
- Apolytirio from Art High School - awarded by Kalitechniko Lykeio.
- Apolytirio from Ecclesiastical High School - awarded by Ekklisiastiko Lykeio.
- Apolytirio from Cross-Cultural Education High School - awarded by Diapolitismiko Lykeio.
- Apolytirio from Integrated Special Vocational High School - awarded by Eniaio Eidiko Epangelmatiko Lykeio.

There are two types of evening-school Apolytirio:

- Apolytirio from Evening High School - awarded by Esperino Geniko Lykeio.
- Apolytirio from Evening Vocational High School - awarded by Esperino Epangelmatiko Lykeio.

The two main types are General Lyceum (Γενικό Λύκειο) - about 70% of the student and Vocational Lyceum (Επαγγελματικό Λύκειο) - about 30% of the student.

== Changes over the years ==
The system and examinations accepted for entrance into Higher Education HE (Greek: ανώτερη εκπαίδευση) in Greece went through major changes since 1980. The below timeline of lyceum subjects and Pan-hellenic exams subjects are from the General Lyceum (GEL) only and it is not an exhaustive list of the all types of lyceum nor their subjects nor their subjects of Pan-hellenic exams, while should not be relied upon as a one.

=== 1984–1998 ===
The most common/known Lyceum is the General Lyceum (Greek: Γενικὀ Λύκειο, Geniko Lykeio).

In the first 2 grades, all students are taught the same subjects. In 3rd grade, students followed a core programme of general education and each Desmi (Α, Β, Γ, and Δ) followed a specialized program (Greek: Δέσμη, Δέσμες / Desmi (singular), Desmes (plural)).

An Apolytirio of Geniko Lykeio included the GPA (scale 0–20), student's conduct information and consisted of:

General Lyceum (GEL)
General Education	Desmi
Religion	Modern Greek & Grammar
History	Mathematics (A,Δ)
Democratic Regime	Physics (A, B)
Philosophy	Chemistry (A, B)
English Language	Human Biology (B)
Gymnastics/Physical Education	Ancient Greek & Grammar (Γ)
Greek Modern Literature	Themes of Modern Greek History (Γ)
	Latin (Γ)
	Sociology (Δ)/Political Economy (Δ)

From 1984 until 1998 only the total score of the Panhellenic Examinations (Greek: Πανελλήνιες / Πανελλαδικές Εξετάσεις) was accepted for the Higher Education Institutions (HEIs). The total Score was calculated from the individual scores, with one of the subjects having a higher weight percentage. e.g. for A Desmi: Mathematics, B Desmi: Biology, etc.

The 4 Desmes (A, B, Γ and Δ) were:

General Lyceum (GEL)
Desmi	(Main) Subject 1 (higher % weight)	Subject 2	Subject 3	Subject 4	Undergraduate Courses
A Desmi	Mathematics	Greek Language	Physics	Chemistry	-> Polytechnics, Physico-Mathematical, Agricultural-Forest
B Desmi	Biology	Greek Language	Physics	Chemistry	-> Medical, Dental, Pharmaceutical, Biological
Γ Desmi	Ancient Greek	Greek Language	Latin	History	-> Theological, Philosophical, Law Sciences
Δ Desmi	Mathematics	Greek Language	History	Civil Economy (/Sociology)	-> Political Sciences, Public Administration, Economics, Sociology

Students had to preselect their choices in a numerical order of preference –using the bases of last year's Panhellenic Examinations' only as a guide– and submit them to their school on a given deadline, using a 4-pages machine-readable document (Greek: μηχανογραφικό δελτίο, michanografiko deltio). The results of the National Examinations determined not only who will pass into highest/higher education but also next year's bases.

The total individual score for every subject was 0–160)). which was the sum of the 2 examiners' scores based on the scale 0–80 each. A remarking by a 3rd examiner would determine the final score if there was a large difference between the first two scores.

General Lyceum (GEL)
Panhellenic National Examinations	Coefficient	Score (scale)
Main Subject (higher % weight)	1.15	0–160
Other 3 Subjects	0.95	0–160

Maximum total score = ((160 x 1.15)+ (160 x 0.95) + (160 x 0.95) + (160 x 0.95)) x 10 = 6400 units

- Units: (Greek: μόρια, moria (plural)), same numeric format with the bases.

First, the scores for every student and later the bases for each course were published in every school across the country, directly from the Ministry of Education and Religious Affairs. Bases were also being broadcast on Greek TV during the day.

It was allowed to keep the individual subjects' scores (up to 3) and resit on exams to increase the total score, but only for 2 more examinations.

=== 1999–2004 ===
There are three grades in Eniaio Lykeio and each grade is divided in classes.

The 1st grade of Eniaio Lykeio operates as an orientation year with a general knowledge programme.

The 2nd grade includes three directions: Humanities (Θεωρητική Κατεύθυνση), Science (Θετική Κατεύθυνση) and Technology (Τεχνολογική Κατεύθυνση).

In the 3rd grade we have again the three directions but the Technology direction operates in two courses: i) the Technology and the Production course and ii) the Information Science and Services course.

In Eniaio Lykeio, there is the Support Teaching Programme. This programme can be attended by those pupils who wish to do so, regardless of their performance.

Right of entrance have only the holders of the Apolytirio lyceum certificate.

The written examinations in the subjects, either at school's level or at national level, count equivalently towards the Apolytirio's GPA. On the contrary, for entrance in highest education only the subjects examined nationally in written form are being considered. The Apolytirio is detached completely from highest education's entrance.

Integrated Lyceum
Elective Subjects (2 Hours)
Philosophy Issues	History of Art	Statistics
Principles of Economic Theory	2nd Foreign Language	Computer Applications
History of Science and Technology	Modern Hellenic Literature	Logic: Theory and Practice

Integrated Lyceum
General Education (17 Hours)
English (2)	Biology (1)	
Physical Education (1)	History of the Modern World (2)	Physics (1)
Religious Education (1)	Modern Greek Language (2)	Sociology (2)
Ancient Greek Language and Literature (1)	Modern Greek Literature (2)	Mathematics and Statistics (2)

Integrated Lyceum
Humanities Direction	Science Direction	Technology Direction A. Technology and Production Course	Technology Direction B. Information Science and Service Course
Ancient Greek (5)	Mathematics (5)	Mathematics (5)	Mathematics (5)
Themes of Modern Greek History (2)	Physics (3)	Physics (3)	Physics (3)
Latin (2.5)	Chemistry (2)	Chemistry-Biochemistry (2)	Development of Applications in Computer Environment (2)
Greek Literature (2.5)	Biology (2)	Electric Technology (2)	Principles of Organisation, Business Administration and Services (2)

=== 2005–2013 ===
Panhellenic Examinations involve 6–7 subjects of the General Lyceum (3rd grade). Besides the Lyceum Diploma (Apolytirio), the achievement score on a certificate awarded (Βεβαίωση, Bebaiosi, 2002 till the phasing-out of the old system after 2016) takes into account final year school grade (school level evaluation) and the grades on 6 subjects of the National Examinations.

=== 2014–2020 ===
At the General Lyceum (GEL) four orientation groups existed with four subjects in each to be taken at the Panhellenic Exams, as shown below.

General Lyceum (GEL)
Humanities, Law and Social Sciences	Sciences	Health Sciences	Economic and Computer Studies
Modern Greek History topics	Physics	Biology	Mathematics
Latin	Chemistry	Physics	IT Applications Development in Programming
Ancient Greek Language	Mathematics	Chemistry	Principles in Economic Theory
Modern Greek Language and Literature

In 2019, the Ministry of Education under Kostas Gavroglou of SYRIZA, decided to replace Latin with sociology in the school curriculum. This decision was not met without opposition from academics related to classical humanist studies, who called the move "anachronistic" and the major opposition party, New Democracy. In 2020, the Ministry of Education under Niki Kerameus (ND) reinstated Latin in the school curriculum, again with opposition from SYRIZA and academics related to Sociology.

== Since 2020 ==
At the General Lyceum (GEL) three orientation groups exist with three subjects in each. All students also examined in "General Modern Greek Language and Literature and a countercurrent subject: Mathematics and Statistics for the Humanities group, and History of the Modern World for groups II and III. The countercurrent subjects stem from the General Education Mathematics and History courses of the Integrated Lyceum, albeit the curriculum and the books have been modified, especially in the case of Maths and Statistics.

Apolytirio - High School / General Lyceum (GEL)
Humanities and Social Sciences	Sciences and Health Sciences	Economic and Computer Studies
Sociology (until 2020-2021) (6) Latin (since 2021-2022) (6)	Biology (Health Sciences) (6) or Mathematics (Sciences) (6)	Computer Science (6)
Ancient Greek Language (6)	Chemistry (6)	Mathematics (6)
Themes of Modern Greek History (6)	Physics (6)	Principles in Economic Theory (6)
Mathematics and Statistics (2)	History of the Modern World (2)	
Modern Greek Language and Literature (6)

== Acceptance abroad ==
Although the total score from the Panhellenic Examinations normally determine the entrance in higher education in Greece, the final mark GPA (Grade Point Average) of the Apolytirio is the entry qualification most often requested in order to be accepted in higher education abroad. The results of the Panhellenic Examinations are usually not requested or are referred by different names such as General Entrance Examinations.

== See also ==
- List of Secondary School Leaving Qualifications
- Institutions of Highest Education in Greece
- Academic grading in Greece
- Education in Greece
- Education in Cyprus
- Educational stage
