= Hellenic Mediterranean University =

Public higher education institution in Greece

Coordinates: 35.5190°N 24.0424°E

- Ελληνικό Μεσογειακό Πανεπιστήμιο
- Former name: Technological Educational Institute of Crete
- Type: Public higher education ducation institution
- Established: 1983; 43 years ago as Technological Educational Institute of Crete; 2019; 7 years ago as Hellenic Mediterranean University
- Accreditation: Hellenic Authority for Higher Education, European Association for Quality Assurance in Higher Education
- Students: 9,560
- Postgraduates: 850
- Doctoral students: 145
- Other students: Erasmus students per year: 150
- Location: Heraklion, Chania, Rethymno, Agios Nikolaos (Crete), Sitia, Greece
- Website: hmu.gr/en/home/

The Hellenic Mediterranean University (HMU; Greek: Ελληνικό Μεσογειακό Πανεπιστήμιο, ΕΛΜΕΠΑ) is a public tertiary education institution in Greece, with headquarters in Heraklion, Crete, and branches in Chania, Rethymno, Agios Nikolaos, and Sitia.

The Hellenic Mediterranean University was founded on 25 April 2019. As of February 2024 it consists of six Faculties, with more than 12,000 undergraduate and postgraduate students and approximately 400 teaching staff and research staff.

The Hellenic Mediterranean University is a continuation of the dissolved Technological Educational Institute of Crete.

== Schools and departments ==
The departments of this university are for the most part the same as those of the National Technical University of Athens and the Aristotle University of Thessaloniki.

Schools	Departments
School of Engineering (Heraklion) (founded 2019)	Department of Electrical Engineering (founded 2019); Department of Mechanical Engineering (founded 2019); Department of Electronic Engineering (Chania) (founded 2019)
School of Management & Economics Sciences (Agios Nikolaos, Crete) (founded 2019)	Department of Business Administration & Tourism (Heraklion) (founded 2019); Department of Management Science and Technology (founded 2019); Department of Accounting and Finance (Heraklion) (founded 2019)
School of Music and Optoacoustic Technologies (Rethymno) (founded 2019)	Department of Music Technology and Acoustics (founded 2019)
School of Health Sciences (Heraklion) (founded 2019)	Department of Nursing (founded 2019); Department of Social Work (founded 2019); Department of Nutrition and Dietetics Sciences (Sitia) (founded 2019)
School of Agricultural sciences (Heraklion) (founded 2019)	Department of Agriculture (founded 2019)

== Research ==
The Hellenic Mediterranean University conducts applied research with a strong regional focus on agriculture, renewable energy, engineering, and emerging technologies. It operates 28 accredited laboratories and participates in national and EU-funded programmes, including Horizon Europe, Interreg and NextGenerationEU.

== See also ==
- List of universities in Greece
