= Agricultural University of Athens =

Agricultural school in Athens, Greece

Coordinates: 37°59′2″N 23°42′20″E

- Γεωπονικό Πανεπιστήμιο Αθηνών
- Logo of the Agricultural University of Athens
- Type: Public higher education institution
- Established: 1920; 106 years ago
- Chancellor: Spyridon Kintzios
- Vice-Chancellor: Serko Haroutounian; Iordanis Chatzipavlidis; Stavros Zografakis
- Location: Athens, Attica, Greece
- Campus: 250,000 m²
- Website: www.aua.gr

The Agricultural University of Athens (AUA; Greek: Γεωπονικό Πανεπιστήμιο Αθηνών, romanized: Geōponikó Panepistī́mio Athīnṓn, ΓΠΑ) is the third oldest university in Greece. Since 1920, it has made contributions to Greek agricultural and economic development, by conducting basic and applied research in Agricultural Science and Technology.

The university is situated in the neighborhood of Votanikos, on a 25-hectare green campus that straddles both sides of the historic Iera Odos (the Sacred Way of antiquity), close to the Acropolis, at the heart of the ancient Olive Grove.

== Academic departments ==
The University today consists of 6 Schools and 9 Departments, offering five-year undergraduate programmes as well as a variety of postgraduate programmes.

Schools	Departments
School of Plant Sciences (founded 2019) (https://www2.aua.gr/en/info/school-plant-sciences)	Department of Crop Science (founded 1989)(http://efp.aua.gr/en); Department of Forestry and Natural Environment Management (founded 2019) (https://w1.aua.gr/dasologia/en/home/)
School of Animal Biosciences (founded 2019) (https://www2.aua.gr/en/info/school-animal-biosciences)	Department of Animal Science (founded 1920)(https://zp.aua.gr/en-gb/homepage-en/)
School of Environment and Agricultural Engineering (founded 2019) (http://www.afp.aua.gr/?page_id=4280&lang=en)	Department of Natural Resources Development and Agricultural Engineering (founded 1989)(http://www.afp.aua.gr/?page_id=4783&lang=en)
School of Applied Biology and Biotechnology (founded 2019) (https://w1.aua.gr/gbt/en/department/) (in Greek)	Department of Biotechnology (founded 1989)(https://w1.aua.gr/gbt/en/home/)
School of Food and Nutritional Sciences (founded 2019) (https://www2.aua.gr/en/info/school-food-and-nutritional-sciences)	Department of Food Science and Human Nutrition (founded 2013)(http://fst.aua.gr/en)
School of Applied Economics and Social Sciences (founded 2019) (https://www2.aua.gr/en/info/dean)	Department of Agricultural Economics and Development (founded 1989)(http://www.aoa.aua.gr/el/) (in Greek); Department of Agribusiness and Supply Chain Management (founded 2019) (https://w1.aua.gr/agribusiness/en/home/); Department of Regional and Economic Development (founded 2019) (https://w1.aua.gr/poa/en/home/)

== Research ==
The university's main research focus is Agronutrition, Biotechnology, Environmental Ecology and Agricultural and Rural Economics.

== Academic evaluation ==
In 2016 the external evaluation committee gave Agricultural University of Athens a Positive evaluation.

An external evaluation of all academic departments in Greek universities was conducted by the Hellenic Quality Assurance and Accreditation Agency (HQA).

== Campus ==
The university is located on the alluvial plain of the Kifisos river. It is bordered by Kavalas avenue and Spyrou Patsi Street. To its east lies the ancient cemetery of Kerameikos and to the west was the location of Plato's olive, whose remains are exhibited inside the main building of the University. The site is split in two by the Iera Odos (Sacred Way) which connects Athens and Eleusis.

Its buildings comprise a great number of auditoriums and laboratories, a library, computer rooms, agricultural facilities (arboretum, vineyard, experimental fields, flower garden, greenhouses, cowshed, sheep pen, chicken coop, dairy installations, and aquaculture tanks), museums, student center, indoor gym, and sports fields.

== History ==
The plain where the university is located was created by the periodic flooding of the Kifisos river. In antiquity the district of Elaionas (olive grove in Greek) where the university is located was considered among the healthiest of Athens. The largest part of the site where the university is located was appropriated by Hadji Ali Haseki, an 18th-century Ottoman ruler of Athens and used as his personal farm. From his time survives one building of the University which is one of the very few of that time that still stands in Athens, though not in its original condition.

After the 1821 revolution the plot was confiscated along with the rest of the Turkish property in Greece and became the Ruf National Farm. In 1888, after the national benefactor Triantifillides donated money to create three post-secondary schools of Agriculture, one of them was created on the site. By some this is considered as the founding of the university. Others though consider 1920 as the founding date, when the Athens College of Agriculture was founded by law submitted to parliament by Eleftherios Venizelos. No matter which date is used it is still the third oldest university of Greece, after the University of Athens and the National Technical University of Athens.

=== Early years (1920–1937) ===
The college was the first agricultural research facility in Greece. As its Greek name shows (Ανωτάτη Γεωπονική Σχολή Αθηνών) the college was originally modeled after the French Grandes Ecoles. First rector was Spyridon Hasiotis who is considered the father of agricultural science in Greece. In the early years the college lacked financial resources and teaching facilities. To help overcome this problem a special fund was set up in 1928. The main income of the university was from the sale of its produce, while the buildings of the Triantafillideios School of Agriculture were inadequate for the needs of a college. At that time the university was under the auspices of the Ministry of Agriculture which guaranteed employment to all of its graduates, thus making the university very attractive to people of poor background. Students and faculty were involved in politics, something that the Metaxas dictatorship did not like and thus moved the college to Thessaloniki in 1937, to become part of the Aristotle University of Thessaloniki.

=== Exile (1937–1941) ===
In Thessaloniki the situation was tougher, since all the work that had been done to improve the site was now useless, due to relocation. After repeated pleads the Occupation Government allowed the return of the college to Athens, but did not abolish the Agriculture Faculty of the Aristotle University which thus exists to this day, as the Faculty of Geotechnical Sciences of the Aristotle University of Thessaloniki.

=== Return and War (1941–1948) ===
Upon return the students and the faculty found the installations in poor condition. Also half the material was left in Thessaloniki to help continue the faculty there. At least though during the occupation, a time when over 300,000 Greeks died of hunger the fields of the university provided food for the students and faculty. The great famine of World War II gave a sense of urgency to the university's founding mission: to help Greece obtain self-sufficiency in food. To improve the level of education a fifth year was added in 1948 as specialization. 1948 is considered the beginning of the post-war era with the foundation of the central building.

=== After the War (1948–1990) ===
Using money from the Marshall Plan the central building was completed in 1952. In 1960 specializations were extended to the fourth year. The 1967–1974 dictatorship brought turmoil to the College, culminating in the suicide of lab technician Theophilos Frangopoulos in 1969, by cyanide poisoning.

Greece's entry to the European Economic Community allowed European funds to flow thus allowing and expansion both in facilities and departments. Thus in 1984 for the first time Departments were formed. In 1990 the college was renamed as the Agricultural University of Athens.

== See also ==
- National and Kapodistrian University of Athens, established in 1837, it is the oldest higher education institution in Greece.
- National Technical University of Athens
- List of universities in Greece
- List of research institutes in Greece
- European Higher Education Area
- Education in Greece
- Open access in Greece
