= University of Central Greece =

Defunct public university in Greece

- Πανεπιστήμιο Στερεάς Ελλάδας
- Other name: UCG
- Type: Public; Higher Education; Educational Institution; Greece University System
- Active: 2003–2013
- Location: City of Lamia, Phthiotis Region, Greece; 38°54′44″N 22°25′40″E
- Campus: City of Lamia, Livadeia
- Mascots: Apollo seated left on omphalos, tripod to left, ΑΜΦΙΚΤΙΟΝΩΝ around, on Silver stater from Delphi, 338/6–334/3 BC.

The University of Central Greece (UCG; Greek Πανεπιστήμιο Στερεάς Ελλάδας) was a public university located in Central Greece, which was founded with the Presidential Decree 92, Article 1, Government Gazette 83/A/11-4-2003 by the Greek Government on 11 April 2003 in the City of Lamia and ceased permanently its operation on 5 June 2013, Presidential Decree 99/2013, Government Gazette 134/A/5-6-2013. It was comprised the Department of Computer Science and Biomedical Informatics and the Department of Regional Economic Development.

== History ==
The first students were admitted to the University of Central Greece in September 2004, at which time only the informatics department was in operation. A total of 71 students were enrolled to that department, of whom 11 graduated in October 2008. The Department of Regional Economic Growth, which was founded in 2005, began its operation in the academic year 2005-2006.

The University operated two campuses, in the municipalities of Lamia and Livadeia. The Department of Computer Science and Biomedical Informatics was housed in the former Lamia Academy, near the old municipal hospital and the public aquatics centre. Administrative functions and a cafeteria were housed in the ground floor to facilitate student access. The first floor housed facilities such as lecture classes, two labs, one computer cluster, as well as administrative services and the faculty offices. A library was also available, which was occasionally used by students and for faculty meetings.

The University was abolished in June 2013. The Department of Computer Science and Biomedical Informatics was added to the University of Thessaly with the campus remaining in Lamia, while the Department of Regional Economic Development was merged with the Department of Economic and Regional Development of Panteion University.

== Academic evaluation ==
An external evaluation of all academic departments in Greek universities will be conducted by the Hellenic Quality Assurance and Accreditation Agency (HQA) in the following years.

== See also ==
- Education in Greece
- University of Thessaly
- List of universities in Greece
- List of research institutes in Greece
