= Democritus University of Thrace =

University in Greece

- Δημοκρίτειο Πανεπιστήμιο Θράκης
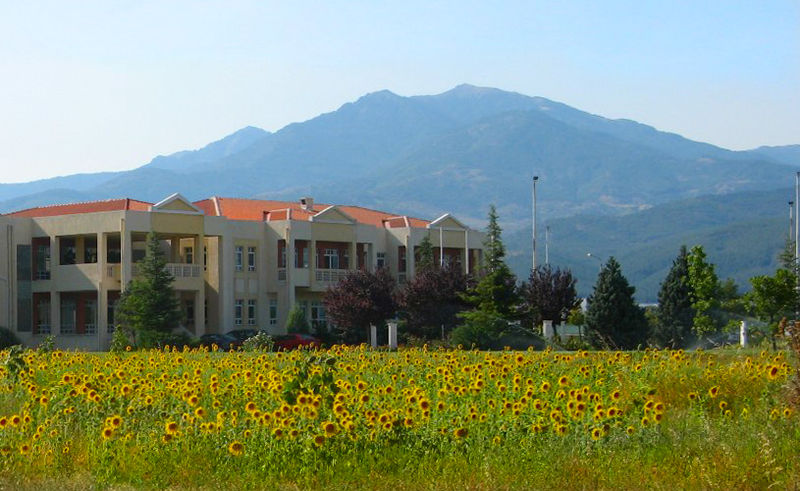
- DUTH in Komotini
- Type: Public higher education institution
- Established: 1974; 52 years ago
- Students: 28,000
- Location: Komotini, Xanthi, Alexandroupoli, Orestiada, Didymoteicho, Drama, Kavala, Greece
- Website: https://duth.gr/en/Home

The Democritus University of Thrace (DUTH; Greek: Δημοκρίτειο Πανεπιστήμιο Θράκης, ΔΠΘ), established in July 1973, is based in Komotini, Greece and has campuses in cities of Xanthi, Komotini, Alexandroupoli, Orestiada, Didymoteicho, Drama and Kavala.

The university today comprises 10 schools: School of Humanities, Engineering School, Law School, School of Agricultural Sciences, School of Education Sciences, School of Economic and Social Sciences, School of Health Sciences. School of Physical Education and Sport Sciences, School of Exact Sciences and School of Management Science and Accounting and 28 Departments.

As of 2020, there is a student population of 25,919 registered undergraduates and 5,071 registered postgraduate and PhD students, a research and teaching personnel of over 600 as well as approximately 300 administrative staff. As a university it is state-owned and fully self-administered. It is thus supervised and subsidized by the Greek State and the Ministry of Education and Religious Affairs. The university plays an important role in strengthening the national and cultural identity of the region of Thrace, and contributes to the high level of education in Greece.

== Name and emblem ==
The emblem of the Democritus University of Thrace represents the influential Ancient Greek pre-Socratic philosopher Democritus. He was born in Abdera, Thrace and is primarily remembered today for his formulation of an atomic theory of matter.

== History ==
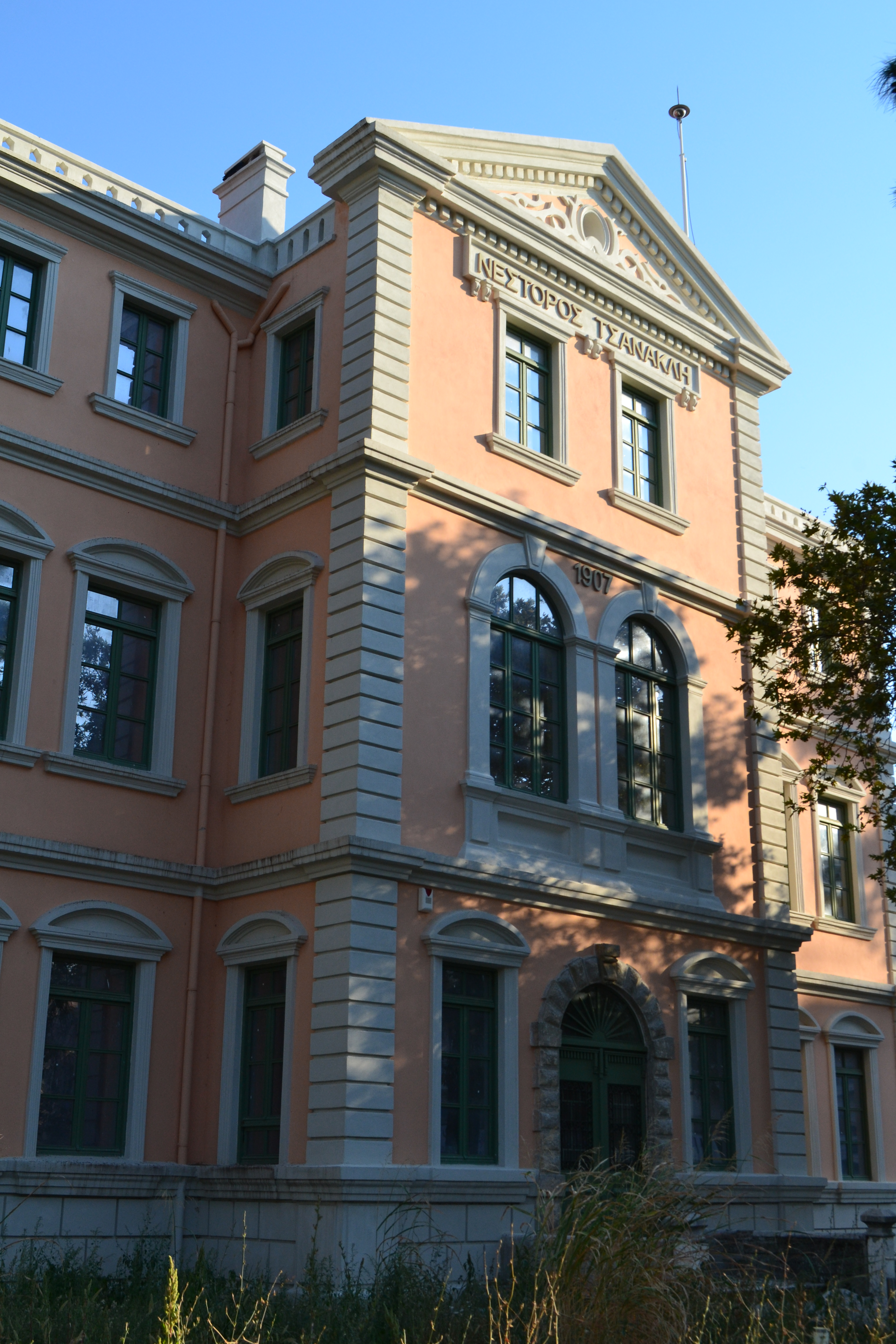
The building of the old deanship in Komotini

The university was established in July 1973 and accepted its first students in the academic year 1974–1975. The first departments to operate were the Department of Law and the Department of Civil Engineering. It was named after Democritus, the ancient Greek philosopher who hailed from the town of Abdera in Thrace.

== Schools and departments ==
View of the campus in Xanthi

The university consists of 10 schools and 28 departments.

Schools	Departments
School of Engineering (founded 1974) (Xanthi)	Department of Civil Engineering (founded 1974); Department of Electrical and Computer Engineering (founded 1975); Department of Environmental Engineering (founded 1993); Department of Architecture (founded 1999); Department of Production and Management Engineering (founded 2000)
School of Humanities (founded 2013) (Komotini)	Department of Humanities Studies (founded 2025)
School of Law (founded 1974) (Komotini)	School of Law (founded 1974)
School of Physical Education, Sport Sciences and Occupational Therapy (founded 2024) (Komotini)	Department of Physical Education and Sports science (founded 1983); Department of Occupational Therapy (founded 2025)
School of Economic, Political and Social Sciences (founded 2013) (Komotini)	Department of Social Policy (founded 2019); Department of Social Work (founded 2019); Department of Political Science (founded 2019); Department of Economics (founded 1999)
School of Health Sciences (founded 2013) (Alexandroupoli)	Department of Medicine (founded 1977); Department of Molecular Biology and Genetics (founded 1999); Department of Nursing (founded 2025)
School of Education (founded 1998) (Alexandroupoli) (Didymoteicho)	Department of Primary Level Education (founded 1986); Department of Education Sciences in Early Childhood (founded 1987); Department of Psychology (Didymoteicho) (founded 2024)
School of Agricultural and Forestry Sciences (founded 2013) (Orestiada) (Drama)	Department of Agricultural Development (founded 1999); Department of Forestry and Management of the Environment and Natural Resources (founded 1999); Department of Viticulture and Oenology (Drama) (founded 2025); Department of Natural environment & Climate resilience (Drama) (founded 2025)
School of Science (founded 2024) (Kavala)	Department of Computer Science (founded 2024); Department of Physics (founded 2024); Department of Chemistry (founded 2024)
School of Management Science and Accounting (founded 2024) (Kavala)	Department of Accounting and Finance (founded 2024); Department of Management Science and Technology (founded 2024)

== Research ==
The research strategy of DUTH aims at one hand to further support its academic and outward-looking character and on the other hand to promote its social role.

== Academic evaluation ==
In 2016 the external evaluation committee gave Democritus University of Thrace a Positive evaluation.

An external evaluation of all academic departments in Greek universities was conducted by the Hellenic Quality Assurance and Accreditation Agency (HQA).

== See also ==
- Aristotle University of Thessaloniki, founded in 1925, it is the largest university in Macedonia, Greece.
- List of universities in Greece
- List of research institutes in Greece
- European Higher Education Area
- Balkan Universities Network
- Outline of academic disciplines
- Education in Greece
