= University of Peloponnese =

Greek tertiary educational institution

Coordinates: 37.5271°N 22.3695°E

- Πανεπιστήμιο Πελοποννήσου
- Motto: Investing in Knowledge
- Type: Public higher education institution
- Established: 2000; 26 years ago
- Rector: Athanasios Katsis
- Students: 26,046
- Undergraduates: 23,703
- Postgraduates: 1,721
- Doctoral students: 622
- Location: Tripoli, Peloponnese, Greece
- Campus: 6 campuses under direct control
- Mascot: Pelops
- Website: www.uop.gr/en

The University of (the) Peloponnese (UoP; Greek: Πανεπιστήμιο Πελοποννήσου, ΠΑΠΕΛ, PAPEL) is a Greek tertiary educational institution, composed of campuses in Tripoli, Corinth, Kalamata, Nafplio, Sparta, and Patras.

The University of Peloponnese offers 22 undergraduate study programs that grant corresponding titles (Bachelor or Integrated Master) and 36 postgraduate study programs. Patras houses the Polytechnic School of the University of Peloponnese, which houses the departments of Electrical and Computer Engineering, Mechanical Engineering and Civil Engineering.

The emblem of the institution is Pelops.

== History ==
The University of Peloponnese was founded in 2000 by Presidential Decree 13/2000. It has its headquarters in Tripoli and is developing at the level of integrated Schools in the capitals of the Prefectures of the Peloponnese Region, Tripoli, Kalamata, Sparta, Nafplio and Corinth as well as in Patras.

The operation of the University was inaugurated on September 20, 2002 with the opening of the Department of Computer Science and Technology and the Department of Telecommunications Science and Technology of the Faculty of Science and Technology.

In May 2019 with the Law 4610 on Synergies of Universities and TEI, both the former TEI of Peloponnese in the city of Kalamata as well as the School of Technological Applications of the former TEI of Western Greece in the city of Patras, joined the Peloponnese University.

The aim of the establishment and operation of the University of Peloponnese is to make a creative contribution to the development of higher education in the Greek region, with high-quality standards that meet the requirements of a modern University with national, European and international scope.

The University of Peloponnese refers to Greece and Hellenism, aspiring to acquire strong ties with the Greek diaspora and to become a pole of cooperation and intellectual creation for Greeks everywhere.

The Rectorate of the University is housed near the city center, in the house where the poet Kostas Karyotakis was born.

== Schools and departments ==
The University of Peloponnese offers undergraduate, postgraduate and doctoral studies, as well as post-doctoral research and educational lifelong learning activities.

== Undergraduate programs ==
Schools	Departments
School of] Economics and Technology	Department of Informatics and Telecommunications; Department of Economics; Department of Management Science and Technology; Department of Digital Systems
School of Humanities and Cultural studies	Department of Philology; Department of History, Archaeology and Cultural Resources Management
School of Social and Political Sciences	Department of Political Science and International Relations; Department of Social and Education policy
School of Fine Arts	Department of Theatre Studies; Department of Performing and Digital Arts
School of Human Movement and Quality of Life Sciences	Department of Sports Organization and Management
School of Agriculture and Food	Department of Agriculture; Department of Food Science and Technology
School of Management	Department of Accounting and Finance; Department of Business and Organization Administration
School of Health Sciences	Department of Nursing; Department of Physiotherapy; Department of Nutritional Science and Dietetics; Department of Speech Therapy
School of Engineering	Department of Mechanical Engineering; Department of Electrical and Computer Engineering; Department of Civil Engineering

== Postgraduate programs ==
36 postgraduate programs (5 in English and 8 in collaboration with Greek and foreign universities):

=== Department of Philology ===
- Ancient and Modern Greek Philology.
- The Byzantine World: Its Relationship with Antiquity and Modern Hellenism (in collaboration with the Institute for Byzantine Culture Research (IN.E.B.Y.P.), E.P.I. of the University of Peloponnese).

=== Department of Political Science and International Relations ===
- Governance and Public Policies.
- Mediterranean Studies (Joint Graduate Program of the Department of Political Science and International Relations of the University of Peloponnese and the Department of Economics and Finance of Neapolis University Pafos, Cyprus).
- Global Challenges and Systems Analysis.
- Local and Regional Development and Governance (in collaboration with the Department of Business Administration of the University of Piraeus and the Department of Economics of the University of Thrace).

=== Department of Informatics and Telecommunications ===
- Space Science, Technologies, and Applications.

=== Department of Theatre Studies ===
- Dramatic Art and Performing Arts in Education and Lifelong Learning.
- Theatre and Society: Theory, Stage Practice, and Didactics.

=== Department of Informatics and Telecommunications ===
- Computer Science.
- Modern Wireless Communications.
- Space Science, Technologies, and Applications (in collaboration with the National Observatory of Athens).
- Data Science (in collaboration with the National Center for Scientific Research "Demokritos").

=== Department of Economics ===
- Organization and Management of Public Services, Public Organizations, and Enterprises.

=== Department of Accounting and Finance ===
- Accounting and Finance.
- Management and Financial Planning for Public and Private Sector Executives.

=== Department of Sports Organization and Management ===
- Organization and Management of Sports Activities for People with Disabilities (PwD).
- Management of Sports Organizations and Enterprises.
- Olympic Studies, Olympic Education, Organization, and Management of Olympic Events.
- Ethics and Integrity in Sports (within the Erasmus Mundus program in collaboration with Swansea University (United Kingdom), Katholieke University (Belgium), Pompeu Fabra University (Spain), Charles University (Czech Republic), Johannes Gutenberg University (Germany)).

=== Department of History, Archaeology, and Cultural Heritage Management ===
- Cultural Heritage Materials and Technologies (in collaboration with the National Center for Scientific Research "Demokritos" and the National Observatory of Athens).
- Modern and Contemporary History: New Perspectives and Prospects.

=== Department of Social and Educational Policy ===
- Educational Policy: Design, Development, and Administration.
- Social Policy.
- Higher Education Policy: Theory and Practice (in collaboration with the Department of Education Sciences and Social Work of the School of Humanities and Social Sciences of the University of Patras and the Department of Primary Education of the University of the Aegean).

=== Department of Electrical and Computer Engineering ===
- Technologies and Services of Intelligent Information and Telecommunications Systems.
- Modern Applications of Electric Power Systems.

=== Department of Mechanical Engineering ===
- Mechanical Design with Digital Technologies.

=== Department of Civil Engineering ===
- Protection of Structures from Natural Disasters

== Doctoral studies ==
The third study cycle of the University of Peloponnese concerns the organization of Doctoral Study Programs (D.P.S.), with a minimum duration of three (3) academic years, the successful completion of which leads to level eight (8) of the National and European Qualifications Framework, in accordance with Article 47 of Law 4763/2020.

The doctoral studies in the Departments of University of Peloponnese aim to promote original scientific research and to make a substantial contribution to the development of knowledge in at least one (1) scientific field and lead to the acquisition of a doctoral degree after the preparation and successful support of a doctoral thesis.

The third-cycle study programs in the Departments of University of Peloponnese include the mandatory preparation of a doctoral thesis in a subject related to the scientific area of the Department and may include an independent course program for doctoral studies, which consists of attending and successfully completing a comprehensive course or other educational or research activities, corresponding to a minimum of thirty (30) credits (European Credit Transfer and Accumulation System ECTS).

== Research ==
About 200 competitive research projects are in progress.

- Participation in 7 Horizon2020 and 20 Erasmus+ projects
- 95 internationally funded projects
- 85 nationally funded projects

== Outward orientation ==
- Collaboration with 8 national and 13 foreign Universities
- Collaboration with 30 national and 3 international organizations (Ministries, Regions, Municipalities, Chambers, Institutes, Research centres, Charity organizations, etc.)

Social contribution via:

- The collaboration with the Region of Peloponnese
- Staff, students and alumni involvement in a wide range of activities

== Erasmus+ and UoP ==
250 Interinstitutional Agreements in 26 countries

Students’ Mobility

- 306 students have studied and 221 have trained abroad
- 171 students have studied and 99 have trained in Greece

Teaching Staff Mobility

- 103 members of teaching staff have gained new teaching experiences in an international context and 119 came to the University of Peloponnese

Administrative Staff Mobility

- 89 members of administrative staff have undertaken learning and/or professional experience in other countries and 66 came to the University of Peloponnese.

== Academic evaluation ==
In 2016 the external evaluation committee gave University of Peloponnese a positive evaluation.

An external evaluation of all academic departments in Greek universities was conducted by the Hellenic Quality Assurance and Accreditation Agency (HQAA).

== Modern Greek classes ==
The university offers summer Greek classes in the Kalamata campus. The program is directed at Greeks living abroad, especially in the United States, Canada, Australia and the UK. For people of Greek descent who have at least one grandparent from the Messenia province, the classes are free as are room and food during the one-month program. The World Council of Messenians Abroad provides the funding for the scholarship program.

== Erasmus programme ==
The University of Peloponnese participates in LLP Erasmus Program (Studies and Placement). They welcome students from:

- Member – states of the European Union European Union
- States – members of the European Economic Area: Iceland,Norway
- Turkey
- Switzerland

== Student life ==
Modern, multidisciplinary, regional and multi-campus university

- Reunions – annual gathering of alumni held the weekend before graduation.
- Student elections

== See also ==
- List of universities in Greece
- List of research institutes in Greece
- Education in Greece
