= Academic grading in Greece =

There are four grading systems (or scales) in Greece – four different GPA – one for higher education, one for secondary education, and two for primary education (grades 3 to 4 and 5 to 6).

== Primary school ==
In 1st and 2nd grades in Greek primary schools there is only descriptive evaluation, with no grades included. In the 3rd and 4th grade grades are only letters (Α–Δ) and in 5th and 6th grades numbers ranging from 1–10 are used.

=== Third and fourth grade ===
Letter Grade	Verbal grading in English	Verbal grading in Greek
Α	Excellent	Άριστα
Β	Very good	Πολύ Καλά
Γ	Good	Καλά
Δ	Almost good	Σχεδόν Καλά

=== Fifth and sixth grade ===
Numerical Value / Grade	Verbal grading in English	Verbal grading in Greek
9–10	Excellent	Άριστα
7–8	Very good	Πολύ Καλά
5–6	Good	Καλά
4	Almost good	Σχεδόν Καλά

== Secondary school ==
The 20-point grading system's range is widened in secondary school.

=== Gymnasium ===
Numerical Value / Grade	Verbal grading in English	Verbal grading in Greek
18.5–20	Excellent	Άριστα
15.5–18.4	Very good	Πολύ Καλά
12.5–15.4	Good	Καλά
10–12.4	Fair	Μέτρια
0–9.9	Insufficient	Ανεπαρκώς

=== Lyceum ===
The Lyceum school has 32–35 hours per week, with 20-point grading system, Law 4610/2019 The Apolytirio certificate qualification receives an additional final mention (level of distinction) with which it has been earned.

Numerical Value / Grade	Verbal grading in English	Verbal grading in Greek
18.1–20	Excellent	Άριστα
16.1–18	Very good	Λίαν καλώς
13.1–16	Good	Καλώς
10–13	Αlmost good	Σχεδόν καλώς
5.1–9.9	Insufficiently	Ανεπαρκώς
0–5	Badly	Κακώς

== Universities and polytechnics ==
- Universities (public): 4FT years (except medicine schools which are 6FT years) (full-time)
- Polytechnics – Pharmacy School (public): 5FT years (full-time)
- Scale: 0.00 – 10.00 (0–100%)
- Pass (module): 5.00 (50%)

The table below depicts the Greek Grading system while illustrates approximately how the Grades are compared with ECTS, US and UK grades:

Greece (0.00 – 10.00)	ECTS	US (0.0 – 4.0 or 5.0)	UK (0% – 100%)
Ἀριστα (Excellent) (8.50 – 10.00)	ECTS A	A−, A, A+	First-Class Honours^{*} (First or 1st) (70–100%)
Λίαν Καλώς (Very Good) (6.5 – 8.49)	ECTS B	B−, B, B+	Upper Second-Class Honours (2:1) (60–69%) Lower Second-Class Honours (2:2) (50-59%)
Καλώς (Good) (5.00 – 6.49)	ECTS C	D+, D, D+, C−, C, C+	Lower Second-Class Honours (2:2) (50–59%) Third-Class Honours (Third or 3rd) (40-49%)
No assessment/award at the end of 4th or 5th year, until all modules, from all years, are passed successfully. Years are extended.			
Withdrawal		F	Ordinary degree (Pass) (without Honours) (35–39%)^{[a]} Fail (0–34%)
			Other: Aegrotat degree HND (Higher National Diploma) for 2 years completed^{[b]} HNC (Higher National Certificate) for 1 year completed^{[b]}

Depending on the school, grade inflation in Greece is rare and it is not uncommon for an examination to be failed—or passed with grade 5—by the vast majority students. Most of the degrees can be equivalent to a bachelor's degree with honours BSc(Hons) / BEng (Hons) since all courses are 4 to 5 years and most of them professionally accredited. All modules, from all years, must be passed with a minimum grade of 5.00 (50%) in order for a degree to be assessed/awarded and there is currently no limit in resits. The classification (Ἀριστα, Λίαν Καλὠς, Καλὠς) is derived from the overall credit-weighted average for all modules including the 'diplomatiki' (university/polytechnic) or 'ptichiaki' (TEI). (dissertation/project)

- Common regulations for the award of Honours in UK

== See also ==
- Institutions of Highest Education in Greece
- Apolytirio and Panhellenic examinations
- Polytechnics in Greece
- Education in Greece

== Notes ==
a. varies from institution to institution according to their regulations
b. varies from institution to institution according to their regulations
