= Open access in Greece =

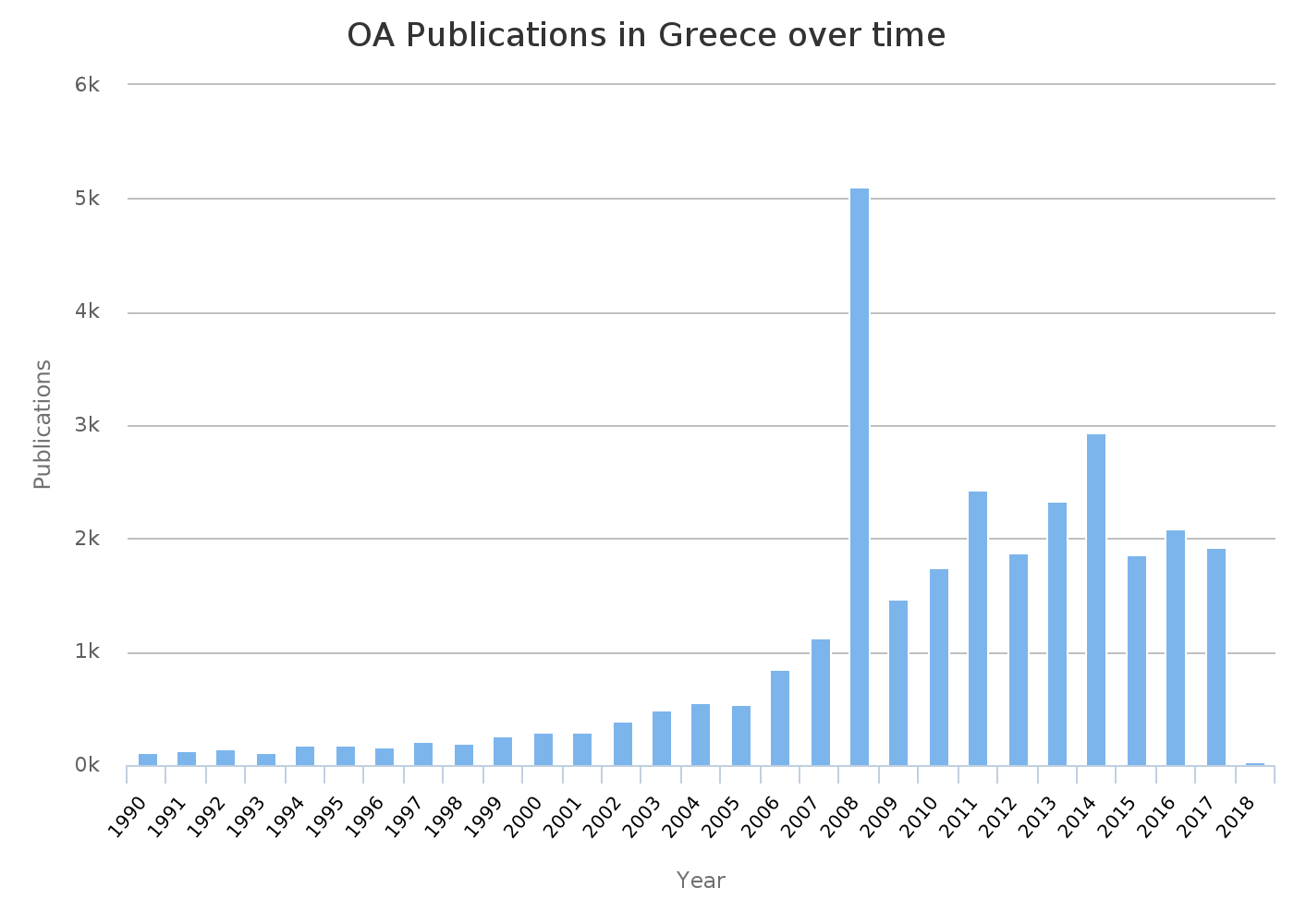
Growth of open access publications in Greece, 1990–2018

Open access scholarly communication of Greece is preserved in repositories maintained by several academic institutions.

== Repositories ==
There are a number of collections of scholarship in Greece housed in digital open access repositories. They contain journal articles, book chapters, data, and other research outputs that are free to read. As of March 2018, the UK-based Directory of Open Access Repositories lists some 36 repositories in Greece. The National Hellenic Research Foundation, University of Patras, and University of Piraeus hold the most digital assets.

== Timeline ==
Key events in the development of open access in Greece include the following:

- 2018
  - June: Hellenic Academic Libraries Link (HEAL-Link) issues a declaration supporting open access.

== See also ==
- List of libraries in Greece
