= Nail brace =

Medical device

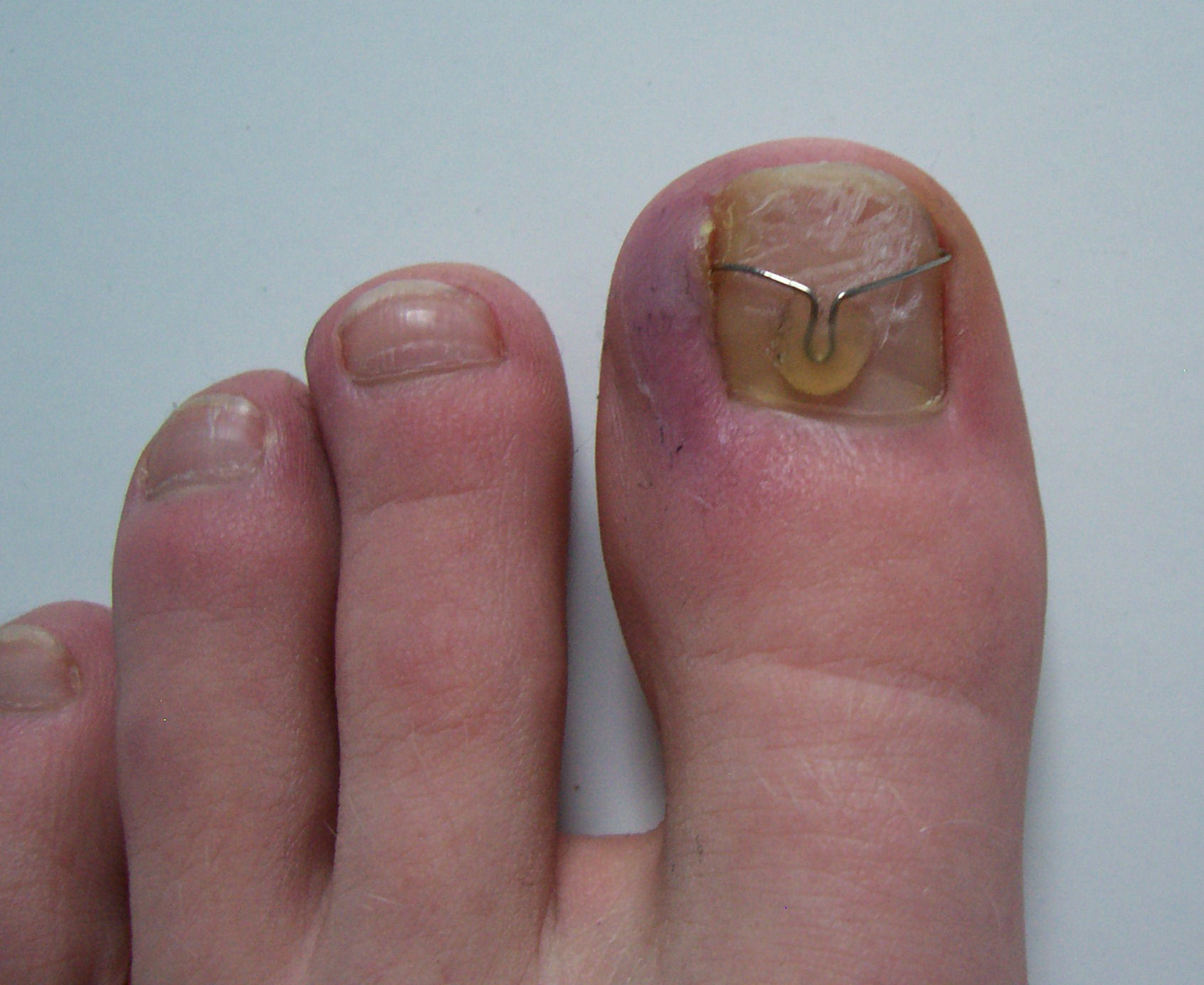
Nail correction brace on a toenail that was previously ingrown

A nail correction brace, also known as an orthonyxic brace or simply a nail brace, is a medical device used to correct the misalignment of fingernails or toenails in order to prevent the nails from growing in. Treatment is usually carried out by a podiatrist or the general practitioner. The latter can also prescribe the nail brace. It is a conservative treatment that can help avoid a surgical intervention.

The nail brace can be made of steel wire or plastic. The brace itself is inserted into the nail fold on both sides and fixed in the middle of the nail. Duration of treatment varies according to severity and averages around six months. During this time, the braces are easily relocated depending on the nail growth. The nail is thus held over the nail fold on both sides during its growth. This prevents it from growing in again. The brace does not cause any hindrance for sports (including swimming) etc.

The first known patents were submitted by Edward E. Stedman in 1872 and 1873 in Ohio (United States). The 1873 patent was later described and illustrated by doctor William Scholl in his textbook The Human Foot. Anatomy, deformities and treatment. In 1960s, the Scottish chiropodist Ross Fraser came up with the neologism orthonyxia and invented his own nail brace. This model was put into production and the idea of nail bracing treatment spread worldwide.

Studies find that various braces have high success rate in treatment of ingrown nails, and result in lesser pain and better patient satisfaction than surgical methods.
