= Paschalis Konstantinidis =

Greek politician (1939–2010)

Paschalis Konstantinidis (Greek: Πασχάλης Κωνσταντινίδης; 2 February 1939 – 26 September 2010) was a Greek politician from Rodopi.

== Biography ==
He was born in Sapes and studied Physics in the Physicomathematical Department of the Aristotle University of Thessaloniki. He ran a frontistirio in Komotini. He became a member of New Democracy and he acted as president of ONNED of Rodopi. He was elected MP for Rodopi in the 1990 Greek legislative election. He was reelected with the same party in the 1993 Greek legislative election. His term ended in 1996.

He died in September 2010 and was buried with a Greek flag, as stated by the protocol of the Union of former MPs - MEPs.

He was married to the notary Eudoxia Konstantinidou - Mandala (who died from cancer in 2007) and they had 2 daughters.
