= Education in Greece =

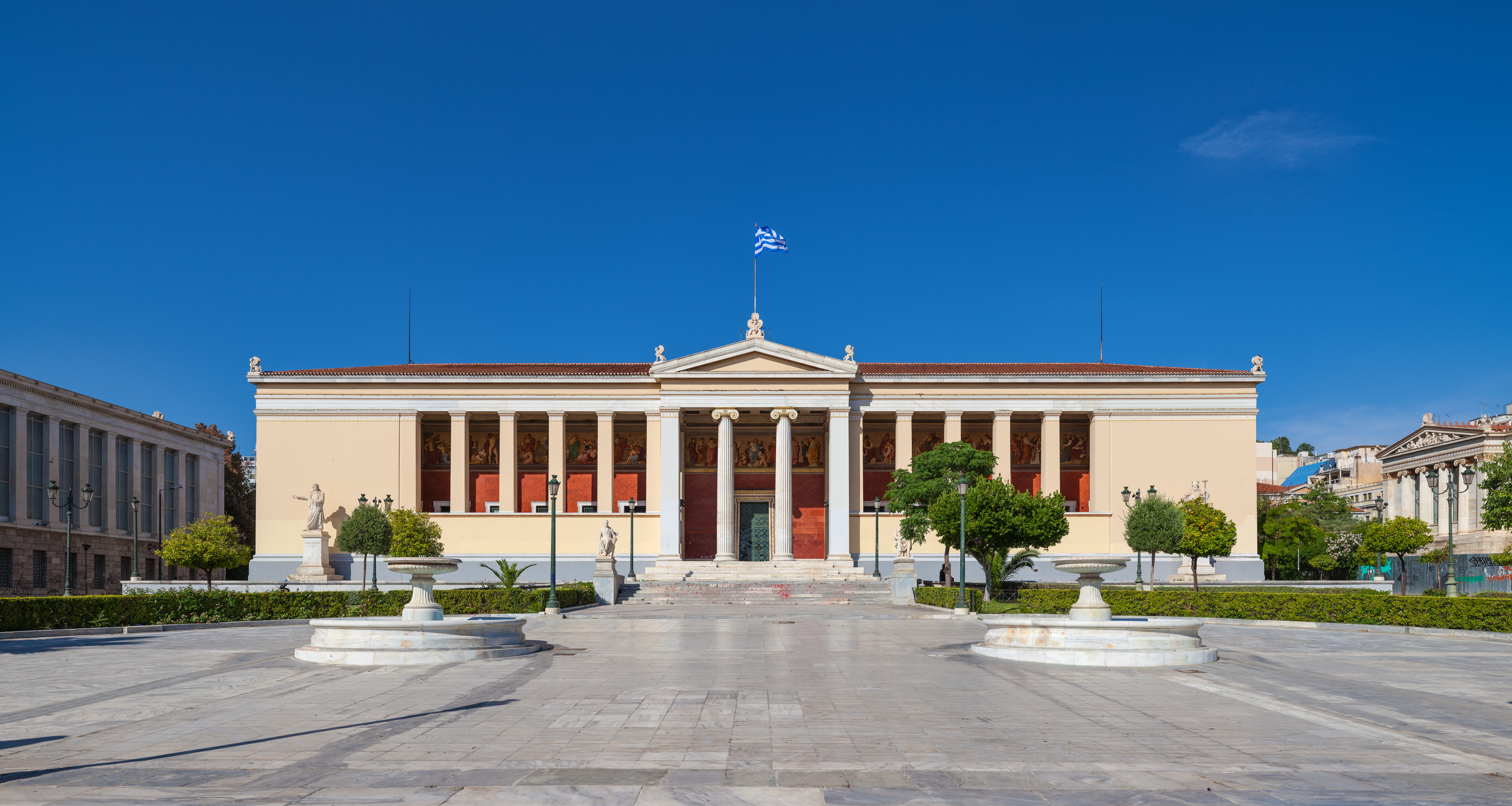
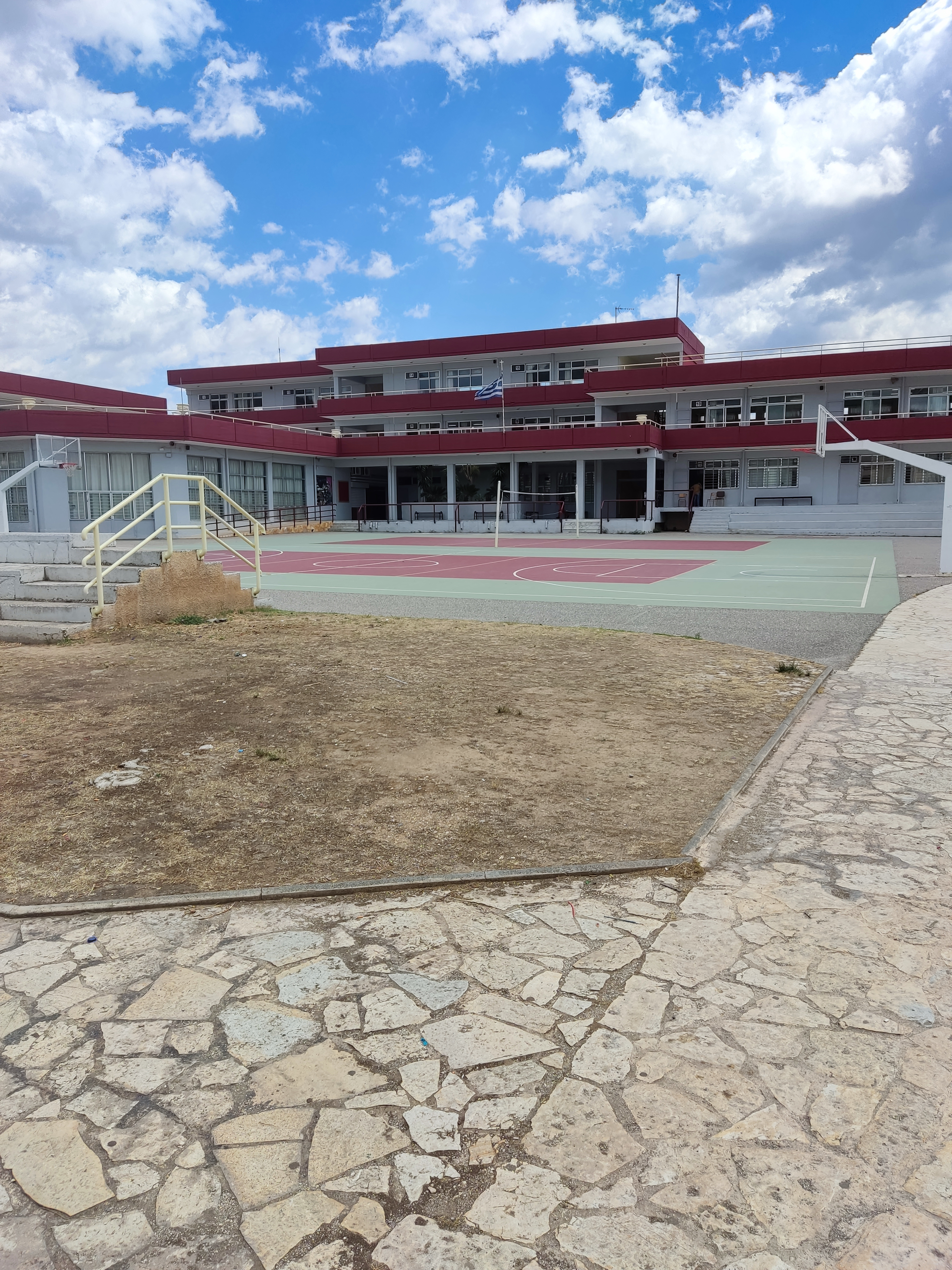
The central building of Athens University (left), and the building of a high school in Argos, right.

Education in Greece is centralized and governed by the Ministry of Education, Religious Affairs, and Sports (Greek: Υπουργείο Παιδείας, Θρησκευμάτων και Αθλητισμού, Υ.ΠΑΙ.Θ.Α.) at all grade levels throughout elementary, middle school, and high school. The Ministry exercises control over public schools, formulates and implements legislation, administers the budget, coordinates national level university entrance examinations, sets up the national curriculum, appoints public school teaching staff, and coordinates other services.

The Ministry of Education and Religious Affairs is also in charge of which classes are necessary for general education. They have implemented mandatory courses such as religion in required grade levels (1st-9th grades). Students can only be exempt if their guardians fill out a declaration excluding them from religious lessons.

The national supervisory role of the Ministry is exercised through Regional Unit Public Education Offices, which are named Regional Directorates of Primary and Secondary School Education. Public schools and their supply of textbooks are funded by the government. Public schools in Greece are tuition-free and students on a state approved list are provided textbooks at no cost.

About 25% of postgraduate programmes are tuition-fee, while about 30% of students are eligible to attend programmes tuition-free based on individual criteria.

Formal education in Greece consists of three educational stages. The first stage of formal education is the primary stage, which lasts for six years starting aged six and ending at the age of 12, followed by the secondary stage, which is separated into two sub-stages: the compulsory middle school, which lasts three years starting at age 12, and non-compulsory Lyceum, which lasts three years starting at 15. The third stage involves higher education.

School holidays in Greece include Christmas, Greek Independence Day, Easter, National Anniversary Day, a three-month summer holiday, National Public Holidays, and local holidays, which vary by region such as the local patron saint's day.

In addition to schooling, the majority of students attend extracurricular private classes at private tutoring centres called "frontistiria" (φροντιστήρια, frontistiria), or one-to-one tuition. These centres prepare students for higher education admissions, like the Pan-Hellenic Examinations, and/or provide foreign language education.

It is forbidden by law for students to use mobile phones while on the school premises. Taking or making phone calls, texting, or the use of other camera, video or other recording devices or medium that have image and audio processing ability like smartwatches is forbidden. Students must switch off their mobile phones or set them to silent mode and keep them in their bags while on the school premises. However, especially at high schools, the use of mobile phones is widespread, especially at breaks and sometimes in the class.

== Diagram ==
Greece Framework
Year in Schooling	Age	Greek Designation	Educational Stage
Pre-kindergarten	4–5	Pre-kindergarten	Preschool (Pronipium, Nipiagogeium))
Kindergarten	5–6	Kindergarten	Preschool (Pronipium, Nipiagogeium))
First grade	6–7	1st Grade	Primary School (Dimotiko)
Second grade	7–8	2nd Grade	Primary School (Dimotiko)
Third grade	8–9	3rd Grade	Primary School (Dimotiko)
Fourth grade	9–10	4th Grade	Primary School (Dimotiko)
Fifth grade	10–11	5th Grade	Primary School (Dimotiko)
Sixth grade	11–12	6th Grade	Primary School (Dimotiko)
Seventh grade	12–13	1st Grade (Gymnasium)	Gymnasium (Lower Secondary School) (U.S. equivalent: Middle School)
Eighth grade	13–14	2nd Grade (Gymnasium)	Gymnasium (Lower Secondary School) (U.S. equivalent: Middle School)
Ninth grade	14–15	3rd Grade (Gymnasium)	Gymnasium (Lower Secondary School) (U.S. equivalent: Middle School)
Tenth grade	15–16	1st Grade (Lyceum)	Lyceum (Upper Secondary School) (U.S. equivalent: High School)
Eleventh grade	16–17	2nd Grade (Lyceum)	Lyceum (Upper Secondary School) (U.S. equivalent: High School)
Twelfth grade	17–18	3rd Grade (Lyceum)	Lyceum (Upper Secondary School) (U.S. equivalent: High School)

== Preschool ==
Most preschools, also known as pre-primary, are attached to and share buildings with a primary school. Preschool is compulsory and lasts 2 years, split into 1 year of Pre-kindergarten (Προνηπιαγωγείο) and 1 year of Kindergarten (Νηπιαγωγείο; Nipiagogeio). Since the school year 2018–2019, children who would be four years of age by December 31 are required to begin attending preschool on September 11 of the same year. (Note: If September 11 is a Saturday or Sunday, then the start date would be the following Monday.) Applications for registration and enrolment are usually carried out annually during fifteen consecutive days in May. After this period expires, students are neither allowed to register nor enroll.

- 1st Year / Pre-Kindergarten (Προνηπιαγωγείο), age 4 to 5 years old (with some 3-year-olds, about to turn 4, attending)
- 2nd Year / Kindergarten (Νηπιαγωγείο), age 5 to 6 (with some 4-year-olds, about to turn 5, attending)

There are also the public Special Preschools and public Experimental Preschools (Πειραματικά Νηπιαγωγεία)

In these school years, students are given descriptive assessments instead of number/letter grades.

== Primary education ==
Primary school (Δημοτικό σχολείο, Dimotiko scholeio) is compulsory for 6 years. There is also the public Special Primary and public Experimental Primary (Πειραματικό Δημοτικό).

The school year starts on September 11 and ends on June 15. The standard school day starts at 08:15 and finishes at 13:15. It comprises six academic years of schooling named τάξεις (grades), numbered 1 through to 6. Enrollment to the next tier of compulsory education, the Gymnasium, is automatic. The classes for a subject vary with the teacher who teaches. Students are awarded an "Απολυτήριο Δημοτικού" (Apolytirio Dimotikou, primary school leaving certificate) which gives automatic admission to the lower secondary education (gymnasium).

In Year 1 and Year 2, students are not officially graded. Beginning with years 3 and 4, grades are ranked alphabetically from A to D. From year 5, when written exams are introduced, to year 6 it changes to numbers, going from 4, the lowest, to 10 the highest (best).

Αges are typical and can vary with the most common ages approximately:

Grades of Primary School

Grade 1–6

- 1st Year / First grade (Πρώτη τάξη δημοτικού), age 6 to 7-year-olds
- 2nd Year / Second grade (Δευτέρα τάξη δημοτικού), age 7 to 8
- 3rd Year / Third grade (Τρίτη τάξη δημοτικού), age 8 to 9
- 4th Year / Fourth grade (Τετάρτη τάξη δημοτικού), age 9 to 10
- 5th Year / Fifth grade (Πέμπτη τάξη δημοτικού), age 10 to 11
- 6th Year / Sixth grade (Έκτη τάξη δημοτικού), age 11 to 12

Grading System

- 1st Year: no grade points
- 2nd Year: no grade points
- 3rd Year: Α–Δ (A–D)
- 4th Year: Α–Δ (A–D)
- 5th Year: 1–10
- 6th Year: 1–10

Primary School National Curriculum 2020–2021

Subjects of Primary School	Weekly Hours of Subjects					
	1st	2nd	3rd	4th	5th	6th
Modern Greek Language	9	9	8	8	7	7
Mathematics	5	5	4	4	4	4
History	-	-	2	2	2	2
Physics	-	-	-	-	3	3
Geography	-	-	-	-	1	1
Flexible Zone	3	3	2	2	1	1
Religion	-	-	2	2	1	1
Physical Education	3	3	3	3	2	2
Environmental Studies	3	3	2	2	-	-
Social and Political Studies	-	-	-	-	1	1
English Language (Modern)	2	2	3	3	3	3
Aesthetic Education - Art	2	2	1	1	1	1
Aesthetic Education - Music	1	1	1	1	1	1
Computer and Communication Studies	1	1	1	1	1	1
Aesthetic Education - Theatrical Education	1	1	1	1	-	-
2nd Foreign Language (French or German)	-	-	-	-	2	2
Total Weekly Hours	30	30	30	30	30	30

== Secondary education ==
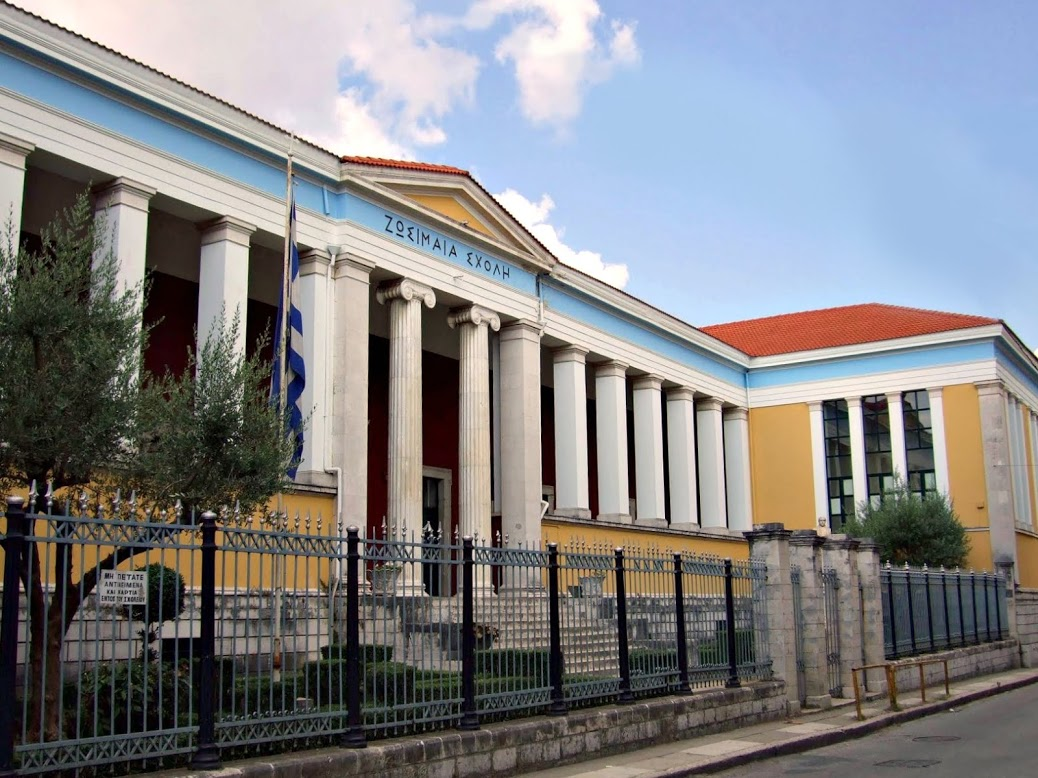
Zosimaia School, Ioannina

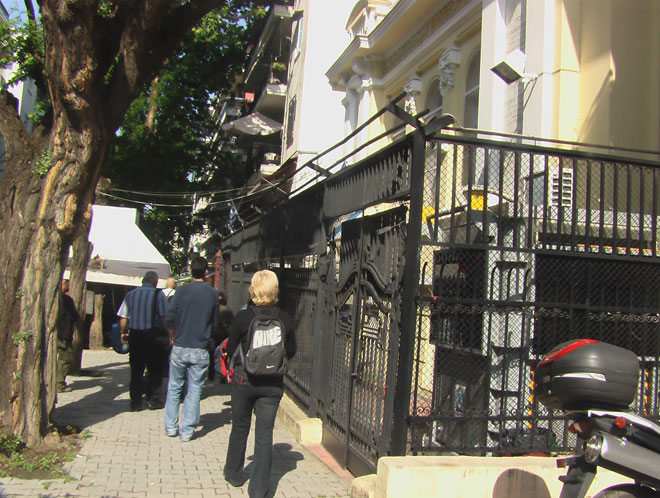
View of the Jewish school, Thessaloniki

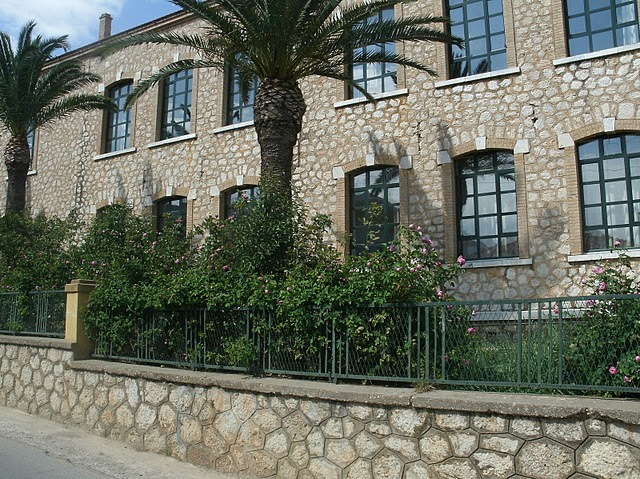
The public school of Astros, built in 1915.

=== Lower Secondary Education ===
Gymnasium (Γυμνάσιο, Gymnasio, Lower Secondary Education School, middle school) is compulsory until the age of 15.

Article 16, Paragraph 3 of the Constitution of 1975 mandates that compulsory education must be at least nine years in length. This constitutional provision, which applies to all Greek children, was established in Law 309/1976, which also replaced classical Greek (katharevousa) with modern Greek (dimotiki) as the official language for teaching at all levels of education, and ceased to be a one-tier non-compulsory six years lower and upper secondary school, middle schools (pupils aged 12–18), and was converted to compulsory three-year lower secondary school for students aged 12–15 (middle school) and three-year non-compulsory upper secondary schools for students aged 15–18 (high school).

Admitted students can be up to 16-years-old, and they must have Primary Education School Certificate or its international equivalent. No entry exams are required. Schooling starts on September 11 and ends on early June before the first day of the Pan-Hellenic Examinations. The lessons end on May 31 so that the students will be able to study for their examinations in early June. The gymnasium school-awarded qualification "Απολυτήριο Γυμνασίου" (Apolytirio Gymnasium, gymnasium school leaving certificate, referred to simply as gymnasium certificate) at HQF (NQF) level 3, gives admission to the upper secondary education (lyceum). Gymnasium has three academic years of schooling known as "τάξη" (grade), numbered 1 through to 3. Ages are typical and can vary with the most common being between:^{[C]}

- 1st Year / First grade (Πρώτη τάξη γυμνασίου), age 12 to 13-year-olds
- 2nd Year / Second grade (Δευτέρα τάξη γυμνασίου), age 13 to 14
- 3rd Year / Third grade (Τρίτη τάξη γυμνασίου), age 14 to 15

The types of gymnasium in Greece are:

- Middle school
- Special Middle school
- Evening Middle school
- Ecclesiastical Middle school
- Middle school of Cross-Cultural Education
- Model Middle school (public; to enter, students must pass certain written examinations)
- Experimental Middle school (public; students are selected randomly)
- Integrated Special Vocational Middle school-High school (ΕΝ.Ε.Ε.ΓΥ.-Λ; 4 years for the Middle school)
- Music Middle school (to enter this type of school students must pass certain musical exams)
- Art Middle school (to enter this type of school students must pass certain exams on either arts, dance, or theater; 2004–Present)

Gymnasium National Curriculum 2025‒2026

Subjects of Gymnasium	Weekly Hours of Subjects		
	1st	2nd	3rd
Modern Greek Language	3	2	2
Modern Greek Literature	2	2	2
Ancient Greek Language	2	2	2
Ancient Greek Literature	2	2	2
Mathematics	4	4	4
Physics	1	2	2
Chemistry	-	1	1
Biology	1	1	1
Geology and Geography	1	2	-
History	2	2	2
Religious Studies	2	2	2
English Language (Modern)	2	2	2
2nd Foreign Language (Modern; French or German)	2	2	2
Social and Political Studies	-	-	3
Economics	-	-	1
Home Economics	1	-	-
Physical Education	2	2	2
Technology	1	1	1
Computer Studies	2	1	1
Music	1	1	1
Art	1	1	1
Skills Development	1	1	1
Total Weekly Hours	33	33	35

In middle school English is mandatory all three years, while students can choose between French or German as the second foreign language that's required.

=== Second Chance Adult School ===
Second Chance Adult School (SDE; Σχολείο Δεύτερης Ευκαιρίας; Σ.Δ.Ε.) is a Gymnasium level equivalent evening school administered by the Ministry of Education, for adults who did not complete their lower secondary education (gymnasium) lasts two years with 25 hours per week.

=== Upper Secondary Education ===
Upper secondary school (Λύκειο, Lykeio, Upper Secondary Education School, Lyceum, High School: the US term for upper secondary school) is non-compulsory education lasting 3 years.

High schools starts on September 11 and ends on June 15. Lessons end in late May so that the students will be able to study for their examinations in June. Admitted students can be up to 20-year-old, while they must have Gymnasium Certificate or Lower Secondary Education School Certificate or its international equivalent. The Evening Lyceum (Εσπερινό) is for both adult students and underage working students lasts 3 years. After having completed the 3rd grade, the graduates of the Lyceum are awarded the "Απολυτήριο Λυκείου" qualification (Apolytirio Lykeiou, Lyceum Apolytirio, upper secondary leaving certificate, high school diploma, referred to simply as lyceum certificate) at HQF(NQF) / EQF level 4, at ISCED level 3. The marking scale on the Apolytirio Lykeiou (GPA) is set to a 20-point grading system, law 4610/2019. The Lyceum Apolytirio is required for admission to Higher Education and to continue studies, and is an equivalent in level to the GCE Advanced Level.

Students wishing to access study programmes in Higher Education must be both secondary education school graduates (lyceum or its equivalent) holding Apolytirio Lykeiou (lyceum certificate or its equivalent) and must take nationally set examinations officially entitled "Πανελλαδικές Εξετάσεις" (Pan-Hellenic Examinations, Panelladikes Eksetaseis) which is an externally assessed national standardized test (university matriculation examinations) given one time in any given school year, which also accept all adult ages for candidates. Apolytirio certificate grants the right to pursue entry to higher education at a later date by participating at the Pan-Hellenic Examinations. Ministry of Education bears the responsibility for the central organization of these matriculation examinations. Candidates exam in 4 subjects that have selected from the 3rd grade of lyceum, while different numerical value titled "συντελεστής βαρύτητας" (coefficient weight) has assigned to each of those subjects contributes differently towards the overall score.

Successful admission is determined through the combination of a) "Βαθμός Πρόσβασης", literally "the access score", that is the candidate's weighted average of the grades achieved in examinations, b) the candidate's "Βαθμός Προαγωγής και Απόλυσης" Β.Π.Α. represents the student's sum of all three Grade Point Average (GPA) earned in 1st, 2nd, 3rd Grade of lyceum each of these is multiplied by a given coefficient weight where the result is divided by two, Β.Π.Α. = (1st Grade GPA × 0.4 + 2nd Grade GPA × 0.7 + 3rd Grade GPA × 0.9) / 2, c) the candidate's "μηχανογραφικό δελτίο" (michanografiko deltio, application form) in which it states its preferences for the higher education institutions by priority order, d) the available number of places allocated in each academic department. The number of students that are admitted for each programme is determined annually by the Ministry of Education. As there are usually more applicants than places available in certain fields of study, students with the highest average exam results are selected, e) For admission to programmes requiring specialized knowledge or skills, special admission examinations are require in one or more certain subjects (such as fine arts, architecture, music studies, foreign languages, and others) or compulsory preparatory tests (such as medical assessment, fitness, sports, psychometric). "Βεβαίωση Πρόσβασης" (Vevaiosi Prosvasis, Access to Higher Education Certificate) is a document given to students soon after Pan-Hellenic Examinations results are released.

With the Law 2725/15-6-1999, article 34, paragraph 10, Government Gazette 121/A/17-6-1999, high school graduate athletes from 17 to 30-year-old who have specific sport achievements they are admitted without Panhellenic Examinations entrance to anyone of their choice undergraduate department of the public Higher Education Institutions of Greece.

High schools in Greece designate school class levels based on the years of schooling of the student cohort, using 3 academic year levels, known as "τάξη" (grade), numbered 1 through to 3. Ages are typical and can vary with the most common being are between:

- 1st Year / First grade (Πρώτη τάξη λυκείου), age 15 to 16-year-olds
- 2nd Year / Second grade (Δευτέρα τάξη λυκείου), age 16 to 17
- 3rd Year / Third grade (Τρίτη τάξη λυκείου), age 17 to 18

In high school English is also required all three years as part of general education courses, whereas secondary foreign languages like French or German are optional.

The grading system in secondary schools is 1 to 20. The score of 20 is the equivalent to an A or 100 in the U.S.

The types of high schools (Λύκειο) in Greece are:

- Ειδικό Λύκειο (Eidiko Lykeio; Special Lyceum)
- Μουσικό Λύκειο (Mousiko Lykeio; Music Lyceum; 1988–Present)
  (to enter, students must pass certain exams on a musical instrument)
- Πρότυπο Λύκειο (Protipo Lykeio; Model Lyceum [public]; 2015–Present)
  (to enter, students must pass certain written examinations)
- Καλλιτεχνικό Λύκειο (Kalitexniko Lykeio; Art Lyceum; 2006–Present)
  (to enter, students must pass certain exams on either arts, dance, or theater)
- Γενικό Λύκειο (ΓΕΛ; Geniko Lykeio; General Lyceum; 1976–1996, 2006–Present)
- Πειραματικό Λύκειο (Peiramatiko Lykeio; Experimental Lyceum [public]; 2015–Present)
  (to enter, students must pass certain written examinations)
- Γενικό Λύκειο Διαπολιτισμικής Εκπαίδευσης (ΓΕΛΔΕ; i.e. comprehensive lyceum type;
  Diapolitismiko Lykeio; General Lyceum of Cross-Cultural Education; 2018–Present)
- Eπαγγελματικό Λύκειο (ΕΠΑΛ; Epagelmatiko Lykeio; Vocational Lyceum; EPAL; 2006–Present)
- Εσπερινό Επαγγελματικό Λύκειο (Esperino Epagelmatiko Lykeio; Evening Vocational Lyceum)
- Εσπερινό Γενικό Λύκειο (Esperino Geniko Lykeio; Evening General Lyceum; 1976–Present)
- Γενικό Εκκλησιαστικό Λύκειο (ΓΕΕΛ; Ekklisiastiko Lykeio; Ecclesiastical General Lyceum; 2006–Present)
- Ενιαίο Ειδικό Επαγγελματικό Γυμνάσιο-Λύκειο (ΕΝ.Ε.Ε.ΓΥ-Λ; Integrated Special Vocational Gymnasium-Lyceum; 4 years for the lyceum)

=== General High Schools ===
General High Schools (Γενικό Λύκειο; ΓΕ.Λ.; Geniko Lykeio).

General High School Korydallos

General High Schools Award the "Απολυτήριο Γενικού Λυκείου" (Apolytirio Genikou Lykeiou, General High School Apolytirio, General High School Certificate, Upper Secondary Leaving Certificate, General High School Diploma). It can be awarded in Orientation Groups requiring three different subjects. The second-grade students must choose one out of the two academic tracks named "Ομάδες Προσανατολισμού" (Orientation Groups), and the third-grade students one out of the three Orientation Groups. An Orientation Group is also known as a "Stream". Once a student has selected a Stream, they need to follow a sequence of subjects to complete their studies at the High School. If they wish, graduating students are eligible to exam in Pan-Hellenic Examinations on the three subjects of their chosen third-grade Orientation Group and Modern Greek Language and Literature.

General High School National Curriculum 2022‒2023
Subjects of General High School		Weekly Hours of Subjects		
Subjects of General High School		1st	2nd	3rd
Modern Greek Language and Literature		4	4	6
Ancient Greek Language and Literature		5	2	-
Geometry		2	2	-
Algebra		3	3	-
Mathematics (Group I only)		-	-	2
Chemistry		2	2	-
Physics		2	2	-
Biology		2	2	-
History		2	2	-
History (Group II and Group III only)		-	-	2
Philosophy		-	2	-
Political Studies		2	-	-
Religious Studies		2	2	1
Physical Education		2	2	3
Computer Science Applications		2	-	-
English Language (Modern)		3	2	2
Foreign Language (Modern; French, or German)		2	1	-
Introduction to the Principles of Computer Science		-	2	-
Orientation Group (Elective) of Second Grade		-	5	-
(One Orientation Group is chosen out of two)		-	5	-
Humanities – Group Ι	Weekly Hours	-	5	-
Latin	2	-	5	-
Ancient Greek Language and Literature	3	-	5	-
Sciences – Group ΙΙ	Weekly Hours	-	5	-
Mathematics	3	-	5	-
Physics	2	-	5	-
Orientation Group (Elective Academic Track) of Third Grade		-	-	18
(One Orientation Group is chosen out of three)		-	-	18
Humanities Studies – Group I		-	-	18
Science and Health Studies – Group II		-	-	18
Economic and Computer Studies – Group III		-	-	18
Total Weekly Hours		35	35	32

Orientation Groups of the Third Grade	Weekly Hours
Humanities Studies	Group I
Ancient Greek	6
History	6
Latin	6
Science and Health Studies	Group II
Mathematics (for Science Studies Option)	6
Biology (for Health Studies Option)	6
Physics	6
Chemistry	6
Economic and Computer Studies	Group III
Mathematics	6
Computer Science	6
Economics	6

=== Public Onassis Schools ===
Public Onassis Schools (junior and senior high schools) locate in areas facing social and economic challenges operate under the supervision and overseen of the Ministry of Education, in close collaboration with the Alexander S. Onassis Foundation through its donation starting totaling 160 million euros. The curriculum resembles that of Model Schools, emphasizing Humanities, STEM, and Social Sciences, Fine Arts, Digital Literacy, and Emotional and Social Intelligence. Attendance is entirely free of charge. Students entering the first year of junior or senior high school will take written admission exams (tests) of knowledge and skills, similar to the process for Model Schools. Furthermore, the final ranking of those selected is also based on a geographical factor. At least 40-60% of the students attending the Public Onassis Schools will be from the municipal district in which the school is located. Teaching and administrative staff salaries will be covered by the Ministry of Education.

=== International Baccalaureate (IB) ===
The English-taught two-year International Baccalaureate (IB) Diploma Programme will start to operate in the 2026–2027 academic year in specific public high schools.

=== Vocational High Schools (EPAL) ===
Vocational High School (EPAL; Επαγγελματικό Λύκειο; ΕΠΑ.Λ.; Epagelmatiko Lykeio). EPAL programme of study is designed in relation to the European Credit System for Vocational Education and Training (ECVET) and International Standard Classification of Occupations (ISCO).

The EPAL has dual-diploma studies comprises two separate programmes taken in parallel earning, both, two separate qualifications in their own right, a "Απολυτήριο Επαγγελματικού Λυκείου" (Apolytirio Epagelmatikou Lykeiou; Vocational High School Apolytirio; Vocational High School Diploma; i.e. High School Diploma; Upper Secondary Leaving Certificate) and a "Πτυχίο Επαγγελματικής Εκπαίδευσης και Κατάρτισης, Επιπέδου 4" (Ptychio of Vocational Education and Training at HQF (NQF) level 4; i.e. Diploma of Vocational Education and Training at HQF (NQF) level 4; also is called Specialization Diploma or Specialized Diploma). EPAL High School Diploma can be awarded in Orientation Groups (specializations or streams) requiring an advanced level in a number of four different subjects (advanced level subjects, or also known as high level subjects), depending on the group.

The Grade 2 students must choose one of nine Orientation Groups, also known as "τομείς" sectors (penultimate year). The Grade 3 students must choose one of varying specializations (or specialties) titled "ειδικότητες" (final year, specialties corresponding those orientation groups offered in Grade 2). The chosen orientation group at the Grade 2 it is cannot switch at Grade 3. The Grade 2 subjects contributes only to the half of a full Grade 3 Specialty, and do not constitute a separate qualification. Until a maximum age up to 20-year-old lyceum graduates are exempted from all core subjects from Grades 2 and 3 of the EPAL High School and they can be directly admitted to EPAL Grade 2, meaning these students when will graduate, it will only be awarded EPAL Specialization Diploma.

EPAL High School Diploma is required for admission to Higher Education Institutes (HEIs) and to continue studies, and is an equivalent in level to the GCE Advanced Level. Students normally select their chosen Specialty in fields relevant to intended study at the higher education, and in Pan-Hellenic Examinations, if they wish, exam in 4 advanced level subjects of the Grade 3.

"Πτυχίο" is transliterated to "Ptychio" (Greek: Πτυχίο; Ptychio in dhimotiki from 1976–present; or defunct Πτυχίον; Ptychion in polytonic, katharevousa up until 1976). The Greek word "Πτυχίο" has translation into English as "Degree", it is a qualification term has common meaning in Greece. It signifies that it is a direct translation from the terminology in Greek as it appears in the Greek legislation. In Greece, the word "Πτυχίο" is commonly used for titles of study from different education levels (secondary, higher etc.). It must not confuse with its usage in the English language, whereby the word Degree refers to Higher Education qualification title only. Greece Universities' Degree is titled "Πτυχίο", transliterated to "Ptychio", signifies that it is a University Ptychio, Higher Education Ptychio, Level 6 Ptychio. EPAL Diploma of Vocational Education and Training at HQF level 4 standalone parchment is an Upper Secondary Education Ptychio, Level 4 Ptychio.

EPAL graduates have the option to choose Post-High School Year Apprenticeship Class ("Mathitia") by which it can upgrade the EPAL Diploma of Vocational Education and Training at HQF level 4 (Level 4 Ptychio) to Level 5. During the year, the students are working for 4 days in a workplace receiving stipend and attend 1 day at school classes. Since 2021–2022 academic year, the Post-High School Year Apprenticeship Class graduates having Diploma of Vocational Education and Training at level 5, after successful specific entrance examinations (κατατακτήριες εξετάσεις), allows to them admission into the Higher Education (level 6) to an undergraduate programme relevant to their Post-High School Year Apprenticeship Class specialty.

Vocational Lyceum (EPAL) National Curriculum 2019‒2020
Subjects of Vocational Lyceum	Weekly Hours of Subjects			Specialties of the Third Grade
Subjects of Vocational Lyceum	1st	2nd	3rd	Specialties of the Third Grade
Modern Greek	4	3	3	Specialties of Structural Works, Environment and Architectural Design: 1. Structural Engineer and Geoinformatics; Specialties of Αgriculture, Food and Environment: 1. Crop Production Technician; 2. Animal Production Technician; 3. Food and Beverage Technology Technician; 4. Floriculture and Landscape Architecture Technician; Specialties of Business Administration and Economics: 1. Tourism Businesses Clerk; 2. Marketing and Advertising Specialist; 3. Clerk of Administration and Financial Services; 4. Warehouse and Supply Systems Clerk (logistics); Specialties of Applied Arts: 1. Graphic Arts; 2. Design-Interior Decorations; 3. Furnishings and Wood Sculpture; 4. Design and Production of Clothing; 5. Restoration and Conservation of Works of Art; 6. Silver-Gold-Smithing (Jewellery Designer-Maker); Specialties of Electrical Engineering, Electronics and Automation: 1. Technician of Electronics and Computer Systems, Installations, Networks and Telecommunications: 2. Technician of Electrical Systems, Installations and Networks; Specialties of Mechanical Engineering: 1. Automotive Technician; 2. Aircraft Assembly Technician (aviation); 3. Technician of Thermal and Hydraulic Installations; and Technology of Oil and Natural Gas: 4. Mechanical Engineering and Construction Technician; 5. Technician of Refrigeration, Ventilation and Air Conditioning; Specialties of Maritime Professionals: 1. Merchant Navy Engineer; 2. Merchant Navy Master (Captain); Specialties of Information Technology: 1. Information Technology Applications Technician; 2. Computer Engineer and Computer Networks Technician; Specialties of Health, Welfare and Wellbeing: 1. Nursing Assistant; 2. Pharmacy Assistant; 3. Physiotherapy Assistant; 4. Aesthetic Art (cosmetology); 5. Hairdressing Art (Hairdresser and Barber); 6. Assistant of Medical-Biological Laboratories; 7. Assistant of Radiological Laboratories (radiography); 8. Infant Care Assistant (also referred to as Nursery Assistant); 9. Dental Assistant (also referred to as Dental Nursing Assistant)
Algebra	3	2	2	
Geometry	1	1	1	
History	1	-	-	
Biology	1	-	-	
Physics	2	1	2	
Chemistry	1	1	1	
Political Studies	2	1	1	
Religious Studies	1	1	-	
Physical Education	2	1	1	
Creative Activities Zone	3	1	1	
English Language (Modern)	2	1	1	
Research Project in Technology	2	-	-	
School Occupational Orientation	2	-	-	
Applications of Computer Science	2	-	-	
Introduction to the Principles of Computer Science	-	1	1	
Three Elective Subjects (each subject is 2 hours/week) (A total of three subjects must be selected): 1. Nautical Art; 2. Health Education; 3. Principles of Economics; 4. Principles of Mechanical Engineering; 5. Agriculture and Sustainable Development; 6. Principles of Linear and Architectural Design; 7. Basic Principles of Composition (Applied Arts); 8. Principles of Electrical Engineering and Electronics	6	-	-	
Orientation Group (Elective Academic Track) (Orientation Group Subjects in total are 23 hours/week. One Orientation Group is chosen out of nine): 1. Αgriculture, Food and Environment; 2. Business Administration and Economics; 3. Structural Works, Environment and Architectural Design; 4. Applied Arts; 5. Electrical Engineering, Electronics and Automation; 6. Mechanical Engineering; 7. Maritime Professionals (shipping); 8. Information Technology (IT); 9. Health, Welfare and Wellbeing	-	23	-	
Specialty (Elective Academic Track) (Specialty Subjects in total are 23 hours/week. One Specialty is chosen based on the Orientation Group has already been studied previously at Second Grade.)	-	-	23	
Each Grade has 32 Weeks and 35 Total Weekly Hours	35	35	35	
Subjects of Pan-Hellenic Examinations: (Four Advanced Level Subjects of the Third Grade) Modern Greek, Mathematics (Algebra), Two Specialty Subjects

=== Vocational School (EPAS) of DYPA ===
The Vocational School (EPAS) (Επαγγελματική Σχολή; ΕΠΑ.Σ.; 1952–Present) of Public Employment Service (DYPA) is 2 years' duration. Also known as Apprenticeship Vocational School (Επαγγελματική Σχολή Μαθητείας, Epaggelmatiki Sxoli Mathitias), shortened to EPAS Apprenticeship. Since 2021, EPAS Apprenticeship is a lower secondary two-track education system, Dual VET (δυικό σύστημα επαγγελματικής εκπαίδευσης και κατάρτισης), having alternating periods in a school with theory classroom and at the workplace with work-(traineeship) practice experience (πρόγραμμα μάθησης σε εργασιακό χώρο), with terms are contractually regulated by law and labour agreement. Balance between school-and work-based training: in-company (ca. 70%) + school (ca. 30%). Student insurance and two-part agreement (σύμβαση μαθητείας) between the student and apprenticeship company are applied. Generally, the maximum number of students that can register in a given education programme is up to 20. Apprenticeship (Μαθητεία) is based on the German dual learning system which combines classroom education with paid practical work in a business. EPAS Apprenticeship is operated by Public Employment Service (DYPA). The EPAS Apprenticeship provides its students in having an apprenticeship term work placement by finding and coordinating it. Students are entitled to receive at least the national minimum wage for their age. The majority of these students are classed as unskilled workers (entry-level). Admitted students are aged from 15 to 23-year-old maximum who must have completed the gymnasium school. The EPAS Apprenticeship awarded "Πτυχίο Επαγγελματικής Εκπαιδευσης και Κατάρτισης, Επιπέδου 3" (Ptychio of Vocational Education and Training, Level 3; i.e. Diploma of Vocational Education and Training at Level 3) after qualifying examinations of the National Accreditation Examinations (Εξετάσεις Πιστοποίησης) will be held at EOPPEP examination centers.

Specialties of Vocational School (EPAS) of DYPA 2024–2025
Social Carers; Fur Processing; Structural Works; Textile and Apparel; Silver-Gold-Smithing; Watchmaking (horology); Artistic Processing of Marble; Aircraft Assembly Technician (aviation); Technician of Automotive Body (coachwork); Technician of Gaseous Fuels (physical gas); Supply Chain Management Clerk (Logistics); Computer Numerical Control (CNC) Machine Tool; Technician of Refrigeration and Air Conditioning Works; Technician of Smart Electronic Devices and Installations; Phytotechnology Business and Landscaping Architecture; Technician of Thermal and Hydraulic Installations-Facilities; Graphic Arts ‒ Digital Design for Print Media (print publications); Technician of Electrical Systems of Conventional and Electric Car; Technician of Engines & Systems of Conventional and Electric Car	Pharmacy Aide; Hotel Businesses; Bakery and Pastry; General Nursing Aide; Culinary Art (cookery); Carpentry and Joinery; Infant General Care Aide; Aesthetic Art (cosmetology); Technician of Shipping Industry; Technician of Metal Constructions; Milk Processing and Cheese Making; Cybersecurity Systems Support Clerk; Hairdressing (hairdresser and barber); Technician of Energy Storage Systems; Technician of Support Computer Systems; Financial and Administrate Operations Clerk; Technician of Electrical Works and Elevators; Technician of Digital Recording and Social Media

=== Experimental Vocational School (PEPAS) of DYPA ===
The Experimental Vocational School (PEPAS; Greek: Πειραματική Επαγγελματική Σχολή; Π.ΕΠΑ.Σ.; 2021–Present), is also known as Experimental Vocational Apprenticeship School, founded in 2021 by Public Employment Service (DYPA) in collaboration with German-Hellenic Chamber of Industry and Commerce and Institute of the Greek Tourism Confederation (INSETE). Eligible to apply are those aged 18 years old and over, holders of at least a lower secondary school leaving certificate (gymnasium) and have a verified knowledge of a foreign language (English or French or German) at level B2 in both written and spoken by holding a valid formal certificate. As of 2021–2022 school year, there are provide the specialities Culinary Art Technician (cook), Food & Beverage Service, Customer Service in the Tourism Business.

The grading system in upper secondary schools is extended from 1 to 20 as opposed to 10 in middle school. The score of 20 is the equivalent to an A or 100 in the U.S. (see grading systems by country).

=== Post-lyceum Year Apprenticeship Class of EPAL ===
Post-lyceum Year Apprenticeship Class (Μεταλυκειακό Έτος Τάξη Μαθητείας; 2016–Present) is provided by Vocational Lyceum (ΕPΑL). Only EPAL graduates and Lyceum graduates hold EPAL Diploma of Vocational Education and Training at HQF level 4 are admitted to Post-lyceum Year Apprenticeship Class being regarded as a separate and distinctive stage of post-secondary education (i.e. Μετα-δευτεροβάθμιου Κύκλου Σπουδών). It includes 1 year post-secondary apprenticeship dual programme (non-tertiary; Dual VET two-track education system) having alternating periods in an EPAL school unit with classroom instruction (theory 1 day/week, 7 hrs per day) and at the workplace with work practice training (4 days/week, 7 hrs per day). All apprenticeships schemes should include a contract (i.e. Σύμβαση Μαθητείας), wage and social security rights/benefits to student which is a trainee referred to simply as "apprentice". EPAL Apprenticeship Class programmes are based on Public Employment Service (DYPA) at its dual learning principle and follow the same quality framework for apprenticeships. Graduates of the apprenticeship class will receive "Βεβαίωση Πιστοποίησης Μεταλυκειακού Έτους Τάξης Μαθητείας" (Certificate of Post-High School Year Apprenticeship Class).

If they wish the Apprenticeship Class graduates are therefore eligible to take the National Accreditation Examinations (i.e. Εξετάσεις Πιστοποίησης) will be held at EOPPEP examination centers. Once, they have been passed all examinations then are awarded "Πτυχίο Επαγγελματικής Ειδικότητας, Εκπαίδευσης και Κατάρτισης, Επιπέδου 5" (Ptychio of Vocational Education and Training, Level 5; i.e. Diploma of Vocational Education and Training at Level 5). With the law 4763/2020 the Post-High School Year Apprenticeship Class graduates having Diploma of Vocational Education and Training at Level 5, after successful specific entrance examinations (κατατακτήριες εξετάσεις), allows to them admission into the Higher Education (level 6) to an undergraduate programme relevant to their Post-High School Year Apprenticeship Class specialty.

Specialties of Post-High School Year Apprenticeship Class
Crop Production Technician; Aircraft Assembly Technician (aviation); Medical - Biological Laboratories Assistant; Food and Beverage Technology Technician; Conservation and Restoration of Works of Art; Clerk of Administration and Financial Services; Warehouse and Supply System Clerk (logistics); Information Technology Applications Technician; Technician of Computers and Computer Networks; Technician of Structural Works and Geoinformatics; Floriculture and Landscape Architecture Technician; Mechanical Installations and Constructions Technician; Technician of Electrical Systems, Installations and Networks; Dental Assistant (also referred to as Dental Nursing Assistant)	Graphic Arts; Hairdressing Art; Nursing Assistant; Pharmacy Assistant; Infant Care Assistant; Automotive Technician; Physiotherapy Assistant; Tourism Businesses Clerk; Aesthetic Art (cosmetology)
Technician of HVAC (Heating, Ventilation, Air Conditioning) Installations; Technician of Electronics and Computer Systems, Installations, Networks and Telecommunications; Technician of Thermal and Hydraulic Installations-Facilities, Petroleum Technology and Physical Gas

=== Vocational Lyceum (EPAL) ===
Vocational Lyceum 3 years (EPAL; Επαγγελματικό Λύκειο; ΕΠΑ.Λ.; 2006–Present)

=== Model Vocational Lyceum (PEPAL) of TEENS ===
The Model Vocational Lyceum (PEPAL) of TSAKOS Enhanced Education Nautical School (TEENS) (Πρότυπο Επαγγελματικό Λύκειο Τσάκος Ελληνικά Εκπαιδευτήρια Ναυτικών Σπουδών; Π.ΕΠΑ.Λ. ΤΕΕΝΣ; PEPAL TEENS; 2023–Present) is the first in Greece non-profit, free of charge (without tuition), private Model Vocational Lyceum (PEPAL) located in the island of Chios with specialties of Maritime Professionals, Electrical Engineering, Electronics and Automation, owned and operated by company Tsakos Group of Companies founded by shipowner Nikolas Tsakos.

=== Laboratory of Special Vocational Education (ΕΕΕΕΚ) ===
Laboratory of Special Vocational Education (Εργαστήριο Ειδικής Επαγγελματικής Εκπαίδευσης; Ε.Ε.Ε.ΕΚ.), 6 years special education at HQF Level 2

=== Public Schools of Tourism Education ===
Public Schools of Tourism Education (ΔΣΤΕ; Δημόσιες Σχολές Τουριστικής Εκπαίδευσης) are operated by Ministry of Tourism. Types are the Schools of Tourist Guides, Further-training Programmes of Employees in Tourism Sector (non-formal education), and Schools of Advanced Vocational Training (SAEKs). The SAEKs cover the specialties of Culinary Art (cookery), Bakery and Pastry (baker and pâtissier), Tourism Units and Hospitality Businesses (front office / reception, floor service / housekeeping, commodity education), Specialist of Business Administration and Economics in the Tourism Field.

=== School of Meat Professions (SEK) ===
Α School of Meat Professions (SEK; Σχολή Επαγγελμάτων Κρέατος; Σ.Ε.Κ.; 1977–Present) is accredited by the Ministry of Rural Development and Food. There are public and private schools of meat professions. The 300 hours programme has 85 hours theory classes at school and 100 hours laboratory classes (ca. 61.6%), 15 hours educational visits (ca. 5%), 100 hours in-company work-based training (internship, ca. 33.3%). The term is five hours per day, five days per week, for 12 consecutive weeks. The specialties of the School of Meat Professions are, Meat Processing Technician (meat cutter, butcher, Greek: κρεοπώλης), Animal Slaughter (Greek: εκδοροσφαγέας).

=== Vocational Training Schools (ESK) ===
Vocational Training Schools (ESK; Greek: Επαγγελματικές Σχολές Κατάρτισης; Ε.Σ.Κ.; 2020–Present) is 2-year post-gymnasium vocational education and training school at HQF level 3. Admitted students must have completed the gymnasium school. It can be public, private, day or evening school. It awarded "Πτυχίο Επαγγελματικής Εκπαιδευσης και Κατάρτισης, Επιπέδου 3" (Ptychio of Vocational Education and Training, Level 3; i.e. Diploma of Vocational Education and Training at HQF level 3) after qualifying examinations of the National Accreditation Examinations will be held at EOPPEP examination centers.

=== Laboratory Centre (ΕΚ) ===
Laboratory Centre (Εργαστηριακό Κέντρο; Ε.Κ.; 2013–Present), three years secondary education. Admitted students must have completed at least the lower secondary education school (gymnasium or its equivalent). Awarded "Βεβαίωση Επαγγελματικής Εκπαίδευσης" (literally "Certificate of Vocational Training"). Awarded "Πτυχίο Επαγγελματικής Ειδικότητας και Κατάρτισης, Επιπέδου 3" (Ptychio of Vocational Education and Training, Level 3; i.e. Diploma of Vocational Education and Training at HQF level 3) after qualifying examinations of the National Accreditation Examinations will be held at EOPPEP examination centers.

=== School of Advanced Vocational Training (SAEK) ===
School of Advanced Vocational Training (S.A.E.K.; Σχολή Ανώτερης Επαγγελματικής Κατάρτισης; 2024–Present) (former Institute of Vocational Training (I.E.K.); Ινστιτούτο Επαγγελματικής Κατάρτισης; 1992–2024), is 2 years adult post-secondary vocational education and training and 960 hours at a work placement (experiential learning, practicum). Admitted students must have completed at least the upper secondary education (lyceum). EOPPEP organization is the statutory body for the SAEKs. The SAEK awarded "Δίπλωμα Επαγγελματικής Εκπαιδευσης και Κατάρτισης, Επιπέδου 5" (Diploma of Vocational Education and Training, Level 5) after qualifying examinations of the National Accreditation Examinations (Εξετάσεις Πιστοποίησης) will be held at EOPPEP examination centers. See a list of SAEK study programmes set out below, click on the "[show]":

School of Advanced Vocational Training (SAEK)
SAEK Specialties	Departments	Fields
Forestry protection specialist ‒ Beekeeping ‒ Poultry farming ‒ Greenhouse specialist ‒ Organic and ecological farming ‒ Technological applications and installations for floriculture and landscape architecture ‒ Mechatronics specialist for agricultural machinery repair and maintenance	Agriculture	Agriculture, Food Technology, Nutrition
Nutrition and dietetics ‒ Food and beverage technology	Food Technology, Nutrition	Agriculture, Food Technology, Nutrition
Management secretary ‒ Distribution specialist ‒ Customer service specialist ‒ Secretary of legal professions ‒ Teiresias/Individuals with vision problems/call centre operators	Business Administration	Business Administration and Economics
Sales clerk ‒ Warehouse and supply system clerk (logistics) ‒ Supplies and warehouse manager ‒ Insurance services clerk ‒ Bookstore clerk ‒ Computerized accounting office clerk (accountancy) ‒ Small business clerk ‒ Bank operations clerk ‒ Accounting office clerk ‒ Publishing house clerk ‒ Real estate agent / manager ‒ International commerce specialist ‒ Stock exchange operations clerk ‒ Industry - small business cost specialist ‒ Marketing and product promotion specialist ‒ Administrative and financial business specialist ‒ Statistical market research and polling specialist	Economics	Business Administration and Economics
Internet technician ‒ Information Technology (IT) applications specialist (multimedia, web design and development, video games) ‒ Computer systems technician ‒ Computer networks technician ‒ Multimedia applications technician ‒ Medical Information Technology (IT) applications technician ‒ Computer and office electronic machines technician ‒ System management and intranet / internet services technician ‒ Telecommunications and information transmission systems technician	Information Technology (IT) and Computing	Technology Applications
Material control technician ‒ Technician of medicines, cosmetics and similar products	Chemical Applications	Technology Applications
Clothing styling ‒ Clerical tailor ‒ Costume and fashion designer ‒ Technician of shoemaking, leatherwear and leather accessories	Apparel and Footwear	Technology Applications
Structural projects ‒ Plastering ‒ Dry lining ‒ Painter ‒ Welder ‒ Masonry and bricklaying ‒ Geographical Information Systems (GIS) specialist ‒ Topographical applications	Structural Projects	Technology Applications
Gaseous fuels technician ‒ Automotive technician ‒ Mechatronics technician ‒ Heating facilities technician ‒ HVAC (Heating, Ventilation, and Air Conditioning) installations technician ‒ Moped and motorcycle technician ‒ Work machinery technician ‒ Thermal and hydraulic facilities technician ‒ Water supply and sewage facilities technician ‒ Automotive paint and body (coachwork) repair technician ‒ Marine engines and recreational boats technician ‒ Computer numerical control (CNC) machine tool technician	Mechanical	Technology Applications
Elevator technician ‒ Automation technician ‒ Medical instruments technician ‒ Automotive electrical technician ‒ Household appliances electrician ‒ Power engines winding technician ‒ Technician of measuring instruments ‒ Technician of internal electrical installations-facilities ‒ Assembly technician of small electronic devices ‒ Computer and office electronic machines technician ‒ Mobile telephony and telecommunications technician ‒ Electronic engineering technician for industrial applications ‒ Radio-Television and electro-acoustic arrangements technician ‒ Telecommunications and information transmission systems technician	Electrical, Electronics, Automation	Technology Applications
Merchant navy master (captain) for recreational vessels (leisure)		Maritime Professions
Sports journalism ‒ Journalism editor and reporter ‒ Radio station programme producer ‒ Film-camera operator/videographer		Communication and Mass Media
Bartending ‒ Culinary art (cookery) ‒ Bakery and pastry ‒ Catering units services ‒ Hospitality animator ‒ Hospitality event management ‒ Tourism units and hospitality businesses (front office / reception, floor service / housekeeping, commodity education)		Hospitality and Tourism Businesses
Pharmacy aide ‒ Midwifery aide ‒ Ergotherapy aide ‒ Physiotherapy aide ‒ Nursing surgery aide ‒ General nursing aide ‒ Dental technician aide ‒ Medical laboratory aide ‒ Nursing traumatology aide ‒ Aide of actinology and radiology ‒ Special diseases nursing aide ‒ Oncology disease nursing aide ‒ Infant and child carer aide ‒ General nursing aide of Intensive Care Unit (ICU) ‒ Rescuer of ambulance crew		Health and Welfare
Mosaic and stained glass ‒ Ceramics and pottery ‒ Watchmaking (horology) ‒ Acting in theatre and cinematography ‒ Drama arts direction ‒ Dance applied arts ‒ Music and song ‒ Music technology ‒ Sound recording ‒ Photography ‒ Painting art ‒ Art of sketch, illustration, graphics ‒ Metalworking ‒ Hagiography painting (Byzantine icons and mural) ‒ Jewellery design and handmade jewellery (designer and maker) ‒ Conservation of antiquities and works of art ‒ Painting conservation woodcraft and furniture making ‒ 3D Animation and graphic electronic design ‒ Graphic designer of print and electronic media ‒ Interior architectural decoration and objects design		Applied Arts and Art Studies
Aromatherapy ‒ Hairdressing (hairdresser and barber) ‒ Cosmetologist, aesthetics and make-up (make-up beautician) ‒ Podology, nail beauty (manicure, pedicure) and onychoplasty ‒ Balneotherapy hydrotherapy and spa ‒ Balneotherapy thalassotherapy and spa ‒ Sport coach ‒ Oenology and winegrowing ‒ Milk processing ‒ Mount tourist guide ‒ Carnival constructions ‒ Persons (close protection officer) and sites security specialist ‒ Guard of museums and archaeological sites ‒ Trainer of candidate drivers of car and motorcycle ‒ Air transport service specialist (flight dispatcher) ‒ Technical operator for personal computer and call centers, customer information and service for blind and visually impaired ‒ Preschool education activities of creation and expression		Separate Fields and Schools

== National Skills Competition ==
National Skills Competition is a skills competition for the skill level of public vocational school students aged 18 to 25 years old with good knowledge of the English language. WorldSkills Greece’s participation in EuroSkills is organized by the General Secretariat for Vocational Education, Training and Life-long Learning (GGEEK&DBM).

== Tertiary education in Greece ==
Higher education, also called tertiary, third stage, provided by Higher Educational Institutes (HEIs; Greek: Ανώτατα Εκπαιδευτικά Ιδρύματα; Α.E.I.) and consist of Universities and specialist Academies, which primarily cater to the military.

There are public Higher Education Institutions (HEIs) and private Higher Education Institutions (HEIs) with the law 5094/2024, Government Gazette 39/A/13-3-2024, which permits in Greece the establishment and operation of private Higher Education Institutions (HEIs). A fully-recognized private Higher Education Institution must obtain a Higher Education Accreditation by the National (Hellenic) Authority for Higher Education (HAHE) and an official establishment and operating license by the Greek Ministry of Education. The public HEIs are mostly autonomous, but the government is responsible for their funding and the distribution of students to undergraduate programmes. The public HEIs can be attended without charge of a tuition fee, textbooks, and for the majority of students meals are also provided for free. About 25% of postgraduate programmes of public HEIs have free tuition, while about 30% of students are eligible to attend programmes tuition-free based on individual criteria. Each academic year is 32 weeks study programme, divided into two semesters of 16 weeks each.

Some of the Greek public universities offer English-taught full-time programmes with tuition are: National and Kapodistrian University of Athens (NKUA) 4-year undergraduate programme in Archaeology, History, and Literature of Ancient Greece, Aristotle University of Thessaloniki (AUTh) School of Medicine 6-year undergraduate programme for foreign citizens, University of Piraeus, School of Economics, Business and International Studies, Department of International and European Studies, postgraduate programme titled Master of Science (MSc) American Studies: Politics, Strategy and Economics, also the University Center of International Programmes of Studies (UCIPS) of the public International Hellenic University (IHU) offers English-taught postgraduate programmes.

There are also private colleges most usually have been authorised to offer foreign undergraduate and postgraduate programmes following franchise or validation agreements with collaborating universities established in other countries, primarily in the UK, leading to degrees awarded directly by those foreign universities.

== Non-formal education ==
The formal education system includes the primary, secondary and higher education. The formal private education schools in Greece includes the primary, secondary and higher education. The bodies of "non-typical education" term (φορείς μη τυπικής εκπαίδευσης) are outside the formal education system, referred to as non-formal education, the well-known include:

- Open Courses that are undergraduate and graduate courses taught in Greek Public Higher Education Institutions (HEIs) that are free of cost, freely accessible and freely available to any person over the Internet (online). It operated by the Greek Academic Network (GUnet), also known as Greek Universities Network (GUnet), a member of the Open Education Global (OE Global).
- Biomedical Research and Education Special Unit (BRESU), School of Medicine of the Aristotle University of Thessaloniki, provides freely online courses to the public for registered online participants via an online platform of a type MOOCs (Massive Open Online Courses). A Certificate of Attendance will be given to those registered participants who attended a course.
- The Citizens' Digital Academy (Greek: Ψηφιακή Ακαδημία Πολιτών) from Ministry of Digital Governance, which has been set in English as National Digital Academy, has launched in May 2020, provides freely online training seminars (webinars) to the public for registered online participants, in the categories of Communication and Cooperation, Internet, Tools for Daily Use, Digital Entrepreneurship, Computer Science, Cutting-edge Technologies. The website includes also the Digital Competence Self-Assessment Tool on the current digital competence level based on the three fundamental elements (knowledge, skills and attitudes) to get a reliable self-testing if and where it needs improving, based on the 2020 Digital Skills Index (DSI) and on the European DigComp Framework, version 2.1.
- The Institute of the Greek Tourism Confederation (INSETE) provides freely online webinar series and online educational seminars with tuition to the public for registered online participants where there are specialty sectors and each sector comprises a number of seminars. A Certificate of Attendance in a sector will be given to those registered participants who attended 70% of the total hours of a sector. Sectors include: Hospitality Operations, Hospitality Sales & Marketing, Food & Beverage, Culinary Arts, Personal Development, Leadership and Management, Human Recourses Management.
- Centre for Lifelong Learning (KDVM; or KDBM; Greek: Κέντρο Δια Βίου Μάθησης; Κ.Δ.Β.Μ.), also known as Lifelong Learning Centre (LLC).
- Centre for Continuing Education and Lifelong Learning (KEDIVIM; Greek: Κέντρο Επιμόρφωσης και Δια Βίου Μάθησης; Κ.Ε.Δι.Βι.Μ.) of the Higher Education Institutions (HEIs), belongs to the Centres of Lifelong Learning (KDVM).
- Post-secondary Education Centre (Greek: Κέντρo Μεταλυκειακής Εκπαίδευσης; ΚΕ.Μ.Ε.).

== Other education ==
- Digital Tutorial or Digital School of the Ministry of Education, which is a digital platform where students can view the content of the courses taught in public schools with short videos episodes.
- Educational Radio-Television of the Ministry of Education, which aims to promote media literacy at all levels of education.
- Active Citizen Actions public educational programme of the Ministry of Education, which is implemented from school year 2024–2025 across all grades of Primary and Secondary Education, with the aim to develop students' skills and strengthening their active participation in society and cultivating the values of democracy and responsibility. This programme integrates the 17 Sustainable Development Goals (SDGs) established by the United Nations (UN) in 2015.
- National Centre for Public Administration and Local Government (EKDDA) (1983) which is the strategic agency of Greece for the training and education of public servants and Local Government employees. It is supervised by the Minister of Interior.

== HQF levels ==
The National Qualification Framework (NQF) of Greece is officially named Hellenic Qualification Framework (HQF; Greek: Ελληνικό Πλαίσιο Προσόντων) has an 8-level framework that unites non-formal and formal qualifications aligned to the appropriate levels from the National Organization for the Certification of Qualifications and Vocational Guidance (EOPPEP; Greek: Εθνικός Οργανισμός Πιστοποίησης Προσόντων και Επαγγελματικού Προσανατολισμού; Ε.Ο.Π.Π.Ε.Π.) and for qualifications granted by Higher Education Institutes (HEIs) in according to the Hellenic (National) Authority for Higher Education (HAHE; Greek: Εθνική Αρχή Ανώτατης Εκπαίδευσης; ΕΘ.Α.Α.Ε.). The HQF is linked to the European Qualifications Framework (EQF) and to the Qualifications Framework in the European Higher Education Area (QF-EHEA). The HQF is the Greek Register of Regulated Qualifications (Μητρώο Ρυθμιζόμενων Τίτλων) provides information for the accredited awarding bodies and the regulated qualifications of study (officially recognized) in Greece. The learning-outcomes-based qualification frameworks level systems of HQF, EQF, ISCED have reference levels classify the learning outcomes into reflection of study load (the number of credit points), knowledge, skills, grant equal professional rights of level, attainment covering formal and non-formal education recognized programmes which are designed within a national context and to make grades more comparable in an international context. See a list of HQF levels which is set out below, click on the "[show]":

Hellenic Qualification Framework (HQF)
HQF Level	Qualifications	Awarding Bodies	EQF Level	ISCED Level
0			0	0
1	Απολυτήριο Δημοτικού (literally "Apolytirio Primary"; i.e. Primary School Leaving Certificate)	Primary School; Special Primary School; Experimental Primary School	1	1
2	Απολυτήριο Γυμνασίου (literally "Apolytirio Gumnasium"; i.e. Lower Secondary School Leaving Certificate)	Gymnasium; Art Gymnasium; Music Gymnasium; Model Gymnasium; Special Gymnasium; Evening Gymnasium; Experimental Gymnasium; Ecclesiastical Gymnasium; Gymnasium of Cross-Cultural Education; Integrated Special Vocational Gymnasium-Lyceum (ΕΝ.Ε.Ε.ΓΥ-Λ); Second Chance Adult School (SDE; 2-year; equivalent; evening school)	2	2
2	Απολυτήριο Εργαστηρίου Ειδικής Επαγγελματικής Εκπαίδευσης (Apolytirio Laboratory of Special Vocational Education)	Laboratory of Special Vocational Education (Ε.Ε.Ε.ΕΚ.)	2	2
3	Βεβαίωση Επαγγελματικής Εκπαίδευσης (literally "Certificate of Vocational Training"; i.e. Vocational Training School Specialty Certificate)	Laboratory Centre (ΕΚ)	3	3
3	Πτυχίο Επαγγελματικής Ειδικότητας και Κατάρτισης (for Laboratory Centre (ΕΚ) graduates only after examinations; literally "Ptychio of Vocational Education and Training"; Level 3 Ptychio; i.e. Diploma of Vocational Education and Training)	National Organization for the Certification of Qualifications and Vocational Guidance (EOPPEP; shortened to EOPPEP Organization)	3	3
3	Βεβαίωση Επαγγελματικής Εκπαίδευσης (discontinued; 1992–2014) (literally "Certificate of Vocational Training"; i.e. Vocational Training School Specialty Certificate; one year post lower secondary education programme; students are entitled to apply for admission until an age limit; lower secondary education (gymnasium) graduates only accepted)	Institute of Vocational Training (IEK; discontinued; 1992–2024)	3	3
3	Πτυχίο (discontinued) (literally "Ptychio"; Level 3 Ptychio; i.e. Secondary Education Diploma)	Technical Vocational School (TES; discontinued; 1977–1998); Technical Vocational Training Centre, Cycle-A (TEE; discontinued)	3	3
3	Πτυχίο Επαγγελματικής Ειδικότητας και Κατάρτισης (for Vocational School (EPAS) of the Public Employment Service (DYPA) graduates only after examinations; Level 3 Ptychio; literally "Ptychio of Vocational Education and Training"; i.e. Diploma of Vocational Education and Training;two year post lower secondary education programme; students are entitled to apply for admission until an age limit; lower secondary education (gymnasium) graduates only accepted)	EOPPEP Organization	3	3
4	Απολυτήριο Λυκείου (literally "Apolytirio Lyceum"; i.e. High School Diploma; Upper Secondary School Leaving Certificate)	Lyceums: Art Lyceum; Music Lyceum; Model Lyceum; Special Lyceum; Experimental Lyceum; General Lyceum (GEL); Evening General Lyceum; Vocational Lyceum (EPAL); Evening Vocational Lyceum; Athletic Lyceum (discontinued); Ecclesiastical General Lyceum; Integrated Lyceum (discontinued); General Lyceum of Cross-Cultural Education; Integrated Multifarious Lyceum (EPL; discontinued); Technical Lyceum (equivalent; discontinued; 1977–1985); Vocational Lyceum (equivalent; discontinued; 1977–1985); Gymnasium (i.e. integrated gymnasium-lyceum; discontinued); Integrated Special Vocational Gymnasium-Lyceum (ΕΝ.Ε.Ε.ΓΥ-Λ); Technical Vocational Lyceum (TEL; equivalent; discontinued; 1985–1998); Technical Vocational Training Centre, Cycle-B (TEE; equivalent; discontinued)	4	3
4	Πτυχίο Επαγγελματικής Ειδικότητας και Κατάρτισης (literally "Ptychio of Vocational Education and Training"; i.e. Diploma of Vocational Education and Training; Level 4 Ptychio)	Vocational Lyceum (EPAL)	4	3
4	Πτυχίο Λυκείου Ενιαίου Ειδικού Επαγγελματικού Γυμνασίου-Λυκείου (literally "Ptychio Lyceum of Integrated Special Vocational Gymnaisum-Lyceum"; Level 4 Ptychio)	Integrated Special Vocational Gymnasium-Lyceum (ΕΝ.Ε.Ε.ΓΥ-Λ)	4	3
4	Πτυχίο (discontinued) (Apolytirio Lyceum equivalent; Literally "Ptychio"; Level 4 Ptychio; i.e. Dual Diploma has: Apolytirio Lyceum and Diploma of Vocational Education and Training)	Technical Lyceum (discontinued; 1977–1985); Vocational Lyceum (discontinued; 1977–1985); Technical Vocational Lyceum (TEL; discontinued; 1985–1998); Technical Vocational Training Centre, Cycle-B (TEE; discontinued)	4	3
4	Πτυχίο Επαγγελματικής Σχολής (discontinued) (1985–2020; literally "Ptychio of Vocational School"; Level 4 Ptychio)	Vocational School (EPAS) of the Public Employment Service (DYPA); DYPA organization belongs to the Ministry for Labour and Social Affairs	4	3
4	Πτυχίο (discontinued) (literally "Ptychio"; Level 4 Ptychio; i.e. Vocational School Diploma)	Vocational School (EPAS) of Organization of Tourism Education and Training (EPAS of OTEK; discontinued; 2003–2013); Vocational School (EPAS) of the Ministry of Education (discontinued; 2006–2013); Specialist Programme, Integrated Multifarious Lyceum (EPL; discontinued)	4	3
5	Βεβαίωση Επαγγελματικής Εκπαίδευσης (literally "Certificate of Vocational Training"; i.e. Vocational Training School Specialty Certificate; for EPAL Post-lyceum Year Apprenticeship Class graduates)	Ministry of Education in cooperation with Public Employment Service (DYPA)	5	4
5	Πτυχίο Επαγγελματικής Ειδικότητας και Κατάρτισης (literally "Ptychio of Vocational Education and Training"; Level 5 Ptychio; i.e. Diploma of Vocational Education and Training; for EPAL Post-lyceum Year Apprenticeship Class graduates only after examinations)	EOPPEP Organization	5	4
5	Βεβαίωση Επαγγελματικής Εκπαίδευσης (literally "Certificate of Vocational Training"; i.e. Vocational Training School Specialty Certificate)	School of Advanced Vocational Training (SAEK); Institute of Vocational Training (IEK; discontinued; 1992–2024)	5	4
5	Δίπλωμα Επαγγελματικής Εκπαίδευσης και Κατάρτισης (literally "Diploma of Vocational Education and Training"; for SAEK graduates only after examinations)	EOPPEP Organization	5	4
5	Πτυχίο (literally "Ptychio"; non-tertiary education; Level 5 Ptychio; i.e. Level 5 Diploma; Level 5 Post-secondary Diploma)	Advanced School of Tourism Education of Rhodes (ASTER); Advanced School of Tourism Education of Crete (ASTEK); Hellenic Police Constable School; Fire Service Academy: a. School of Junior Fire Officers.; b. School of Senior Fire Officers.; c. School of Fire Officers.; d. Training and Further Education School.; e. National Civil Protection School.	5	4
6	Πτυχίο (literally "Ptychio"; first-cycle tertiary education; Level 6 Ptychio; i.e. First University Degree; Level 6 Higher Education Degree; Bachelor's degree; also known as "Πτυχίο Ανώτατης Εκπαίδευσης" literally "Ptychio Higher Education")	Higher Education Institutions (HEIs); Technological Educational Institutes (TEIs; discontinued; a type of Higher Education Institutions (HEIs); 1983–2019; TEI undergraduate programmes consisted of four years 1995–2019 and 240 ECTS, previously a three and a half years 1983–1995 and 210 ECTS law 1404/1983)	6	6
7	Δίπλωμα (literally "Diploma"; second-cycle tertiary education; Level 7 Diploma; at least 5 years duration; i.e. Integrated master's degree; Long First Degree; Double Degree has Bachelor's and Master's)	Higher Education Institutions (HEIs)	7	7
7	Μεταπτυχιακό Δίπλωμα Ειδίκευσης (literally "Postgraduate Specialized Diploma"; second-cycle tertiary education; Level 7 Postgraduate Diploma; Level 7 Diploma; i.e. Level 7 Higher Education Degree; Second University Degree; Master's degree)	Higher Education Institutions (HEIs); Technological Educational Institutes (TEIs; discontinued; a type of Higher Education Institutions (HEIs) of Ministry of Education; 1983–2019; TEI Level 7 postgraduate programmes 2008–2019 law 3685/2008)	7	7
8	Διδακτορικό Δίπλωμα (literally "Doctoral Diploma"; third-cycle tertiary education; Level 8 Diploma; Level 8 Postgraduate Diploma; i.e. Level 8 Higher Education Degree; Third University Degree; Doctoral degree)	Higher Education Institutions (HEIs)	8	8
The European Qualifications Framework (EQF) levels and the International Standard Classification of Education (ISCED) levels are levels equivalent to the Hellenic Qualification Framework (HQF).; In Greece, the use of Higher Education legally protected academic term "Degree", either first, second, third cycle, has an equivalent to Greek Higher Education. Any assertion or use the term either degree, or bachelor's degree, associate degree, doctoral degree, from a Greece located school (non-Higher Education) at HQF level less than 6, is a criminal offence and prohibited by law.; The accredited Private Colleges, which belong to the Post-secondary Education Centres (ΚΕΜΕ), are non-formal and not have relation with HQF as their qualifications are from foreign countries.; Equivalent qualification is a qualification declared by the relevant Course Authority to have a sufficient similarity of content to another qualification, despite having a different title or different level.; Database index herein may not reflect recent changes and is not an exhaustive list of existing qualifications, awarding bodies, discontinued or defunct qualifications and awarding bodies.; An education programme when it was offered it was from-to academic years, e.g. 1983–1995 means this programme was from 1983–1984 to 1994–1995 academic year.; Officially, the discontinued qualifications abide by the particular laws in which first defined, are currently still retaining their initial value and HQF level.; All TEIs in Greece were reformed between 2013 and 2019 and their departments incorporated into existing Higher Education Institutions (HEIs).; Not all discontinued qualifications have a legitimately corresponding equivalent qualification (the newly adapted version) at present time.; Double Diploma is a Double Award; by award, it means any awarded qualification e.g. Certificate, Diploma, Degree, and others.; Discontinued qualification is no longer offering, being withdrawn, being reformed qualification, or transition to new qualification.; Discontinued awarding body is no longer a stand-alone entity due to either has been phased out, closure, or replacement.; An equivalent qualification of study is recognised on par with a qualification, and carries value at same level and purpose.; The awarding bodies are private and public type, where applicable. All the Higher Education Institutes (HEIs) are public.; Data as at August 2021. The latest and up to date HQF levels information are published in the HQF's website.

== Former education schools ==
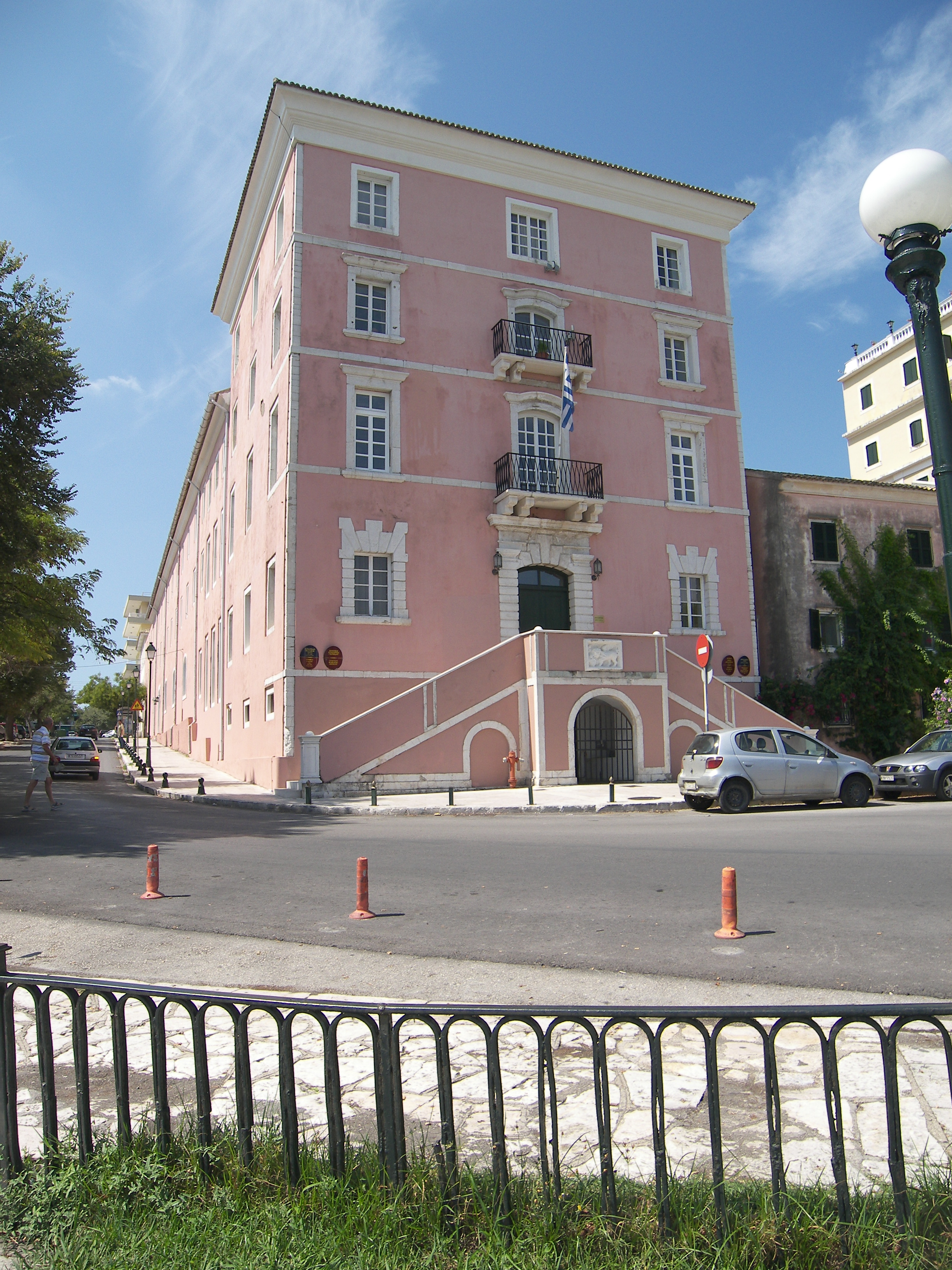
View of the Ionian Academy, Corfu

Education schools are defunct after either closure or replacement, for example:

Secondary Vocational Schools of Ministry of Education (Υ.ΠΑΙ.Θ.):

- Επαγγελματική Σχολή (ΕΠΑΣ; Vocational School; 2 years; Law 3475/2006; 2006–2013) 25 hours/week. Only subjects of specialization. Admitted students must have completed at least the first grade of the upper secondary education school (lyceum). Awarded Specialization Diploma.
- Σχολικό Εργαστηριακό Κέντρο (ΣΕΚ; Schooled Vocational Training Centre; SEK; 3 years, 1986–2013)
- Τεχνική Επαγγελματική Σχολή (ΤΕΣ; Technical Vocational School; 2 years; Law 576/1977; 1977–1998) 70% subjects of specialization and 30% subjects of general education. Admitted students must have completed at least the final year of the lower secondary education school (gymnasium graduates or its equivalent). Awarded Specialization Diploma.

Higher Education Institutes of Ministry of Education:

- Τεχνολογικό Εκπαιδευτικό Ίδρυμα (ΤΕΙ; Technological Educational Institute; 3 1/2 years 1983–1995, 4 years 1995–2019, 1983–2019)

Varied Schools:

- Σχολές Τουριστικής Εκπαίδευσης (ΣΤΕ; Schools of Tourism Education; Law 2387/2000; 2000–2003)
- Σχολές Τουριστικών Επαγγελμάτων (ΣΤΕ; Schools of Tourism Professions; Law 567/1937; 1937–2000)
- Λύκειο Εμπορικού Ναυτικού (ΛΕΝ; Merchant Navy Lyceum; 3 years; by Ministry of Mercantile Marine; –1998)
- Κέντρα Επαγγελματικής Κατάρτισης (ΚΕΚ; Vocational Training Centres; replaced by KDVM of type 2, 1990–2012)
- Κέντρα Ανωτέρας Τεχνικής Εκπαίδευσης (ΚΑΤΕ; Centers for Higher Technical Education; Law 652/1970; 1970–1977)
- Δημόσιες Τεχνικές Σχολές Υπομηχανικών (ΔΤΣΥ; Public Technical Schools of Assistant Engineers; 4 years, 1959–1966)
- Ινστιτούτο Επαγγελματικής Κατάρτισης, του ΟΤΕΚ (ΙΕΚ; Institute of Vocational Training; by ΟΤΕΚ; Law 3105/2003; 2003–2013)
- Κέντρα Επαγγελματικής και Τεχνικής Εκπαίδευσης (ΚΕΤΕ; Centres of Vocational and Technical Education; consists of a Technical Lyceum, a Vocational Lyceum, and a Technical Vocational School; Law 576/1977; 1977–1985)
- Εργαστήρια Ελευθέρων Σπουδών (ΕΕΣ; Centres of Liberal Studies; Legislative Decree 9/9-10-1935; replaced by KDVM of type 1; 1935–2012)
- Κέντρα Ανωτέρας Τεχνικής και Επαγγελματικής Εκπαίδευσης (ΚΑΤΕΕ; Centers for Higher Technical-Vocational Education; Law 576/1977; 1977–1983)
- Επαγγελματική Σχολή, του ΟΤΕΚ (ΕΠΑΣ; Vocational School; by Organization of Tourism Education and Training [ΟΤΕΚ]; Law 3105/2003; 2003–2013)
- Κέντρο Δια Βίου Μάθησης; Κ.Δ.Β.Μ. τύπου 1 και τύπου 2 (KDVM of type 1, KDVM of type 2; replaced by KDVM; 2012–2020)
- Ινστιτούτο Επαγγελματικής Κατάρτισης; Ι.Ε.Κ. (Institute of Vocational Training; replaced by School of Advanced Vocational Training (SAEK); Law 5082/2024; 1992–2024)

Lyceums of Ministry of Education:

- Αθλητικό Λύκειο (Athletic Lyceum; 3 years)
- Ενιαίο Λύκειο (Integrated Lyceum; 3 years, 1997–2006)
- Κλασικό Λύκειο (Classic Lyceum; 3 years; Law 1566/1985; 1985 –1997)
- Τεχνικό Λύκειο (Technical Lyceum; 3 years; Law 576/1977; 1977–1985)
- Επαγγελματικό Λύκειο (Vocational Lyceum; 3 years; Law 576/1977; 1977–1985)
- Λύκειο Ναυτικής Κατεύθυνσης (Nautical Lyceum; 3 years; Law 309/1976; 1976–1985)
- Εξατάξιο Γυμνάσιο (Six-Grade Gymnasium; integrated 3 years lower and 3 years upper secondary school)
- Τεχνικό Επαγγελματικό Εκπαιδευτήριο (ΤΕΕ; Technical Vocational Training Centre; 3 years; Law 2640/1998; 1998–2006)
- Τεχνικό Επαγγελματικό Λύκειο (ΤΕΛ; Technical Vocational Lyceum; 3 years; Law 1566/1985, Government Gazette 167/A/30-9-1985, 1985–1998) awarded upper secondary leaving certificate titled "Πτυχίο Τεχνικού Επαγγελματικού Λυκείου", Technical Vocational Lyceum Ptychio (Level 4), i.e. Technical Vocational Lyceum Diploma was one (dual) qualification has both an Apolytirio and a Specialization Diploma, 34 hours/week, i.e. High School Diploma comprising core curriculum and tech-vocational curriculum subjects awarded one parchment with both curricula listed.

Programmes of the Technical Lyceum, Vocational Lyceum, Technical Vocational Lyceum
Technical Vocational Lyceum Specialties (1985–1998)
Technical Lyceum Specialties (1977–1985)	Vocational Lyceum Specialties (1977–1985)
Specialties of Electrical Engineering and Electronic Sector: Industry Electrical Installations-Facilities and External Networks; Electronic Installations-Facilities and Automation; Internal Electrical Installations-Facilities; Electric and Electronics Design; Technicians and Computers; Specialists of Chemical and Metallurgical Sector: Chemical Laboratories; Chemical Industries; Mines; Specialties of Weaving and Textile Sector: Weaving-Textile; Plaiting; Dyeing; Textile; Specialties of Structural Sector: Designer of Works of the Structural Engineers and Architects; Transportation and Hydraulic Engineering; Buildings Projects; Mechanical Engineering Sector: Industry Installations and Industry Manufactory; Thermal and Cooling Installations; Precision Instruments; Mechanical Design; Information Technology Sector: Computer Software Programmer; Specialties of Applied Arts Sector: Conservator of Antiquities and Works of Art; Ceramics and Artistic Processing of Glass; Freehand Drawing and Painting; Mosaic and Stained Glass; Interior Designer; Graphic Arts; Furnishings; Printing; Music	Specialties of Business Administration and Economics Sector: Warehouse and Supply System Clerk (former Nautical and Transportation Business); Accounting Office Clerk (accountancy); Commercial Businesses; Hospitality Businesses; Business Office Clerk; Specialties of Agriculture and Livestock Sector: Agri-food Societies and Agricultural Holdings; Fish Production and Fishery; Agricultural Machinery; Forestry Production; Animal Production; Crop Production; Floriculture; Specialties of Social Services Sector: Dental Assistant (or Dental Nursing Assistant); Assistant of Medical-Biological Laboratories; Assistant of Infant Carers and Child Carers; Medical Devices Operator; Physiotherapy Assistant; Medical Representative; Pharmacy Assistant; Nursing Assistant; Dietetic; Specialties of Maritime Sector: Merchant Navy Master (Captain); Merchant Navy Engineer
The second grade students must be chosen one sector; The third grade students must be chosen one specialty based on the sector has already been studied previously at second grade

- Ενιαίο Πολυκλαδικό Λύκειο (ΕΠΛ; Integrated Multifarious Lyceum (EPL); 3 years; Law 1566/1985; 1985–1997)

Programmes of Integrated Multifarious Lyceum (EPL)
Integrated Multifarious Lyceum (EPL) (1985–1997)
First Grade (Year 1)			Second Grade (Year 2)	
Core Subjects and Elective Subjects			Cycle 1, Human and Health; Cycle 2, Health, Natural Sciences, Social Welfare; Cycle 3, Business Administration and Economics; Cycle 4, Mechanical Technology; Cycle 5, Electrical, Electronics Technology; Cycle 6, Chemical Technology	
No	Third Grade (Year 3) – Fields of Study	Cycles	Optional Fourth Grade (Year 4) – Specialist Programmes	Code
1	C Desmi (Four Advanced Level Subjects)	1	non-offerings	-
2	Business Administrative Services - Secretaries	1, 3	Administrative Clerks	TE2
3	Librarianship (Library Operations)	1, 3	non-offerings	-
4	Information Technology (IT)	1, 2, 3, 4, 5, 6	Computer Programmers (of Secondary Education)	TE4
5	Β Desmi (Four Advanced Level Subjects)	2, 4, 5, 6	non-offerings	-
6	Medical Laboratories	2, 6	Assistant Technicians of Biological and Medical Laboratories	TE6
7	Social Welfare	1, 2, 3	Social Welfare Guardian	TE7
8	D Desmi (Four Advanced Level Subjects)	2, 3, 4, 5, 6	non-offerings	-
9	Economics	3	Financial Services Clerk	TE9
10	Applied Arts	1, 2, 3, 4, 5, 6	Graphic Designer	TE10
11	A Desmi (Four Advanced Level Subjects)	2, 4, 5, 6	non-offerings	-
12	Structural Works	4	non-offerings	-
13	Mechanical	4	Automotive Technician	TE13
14	Electrical	5	Electricians of General Electrical Applications	TE14
15	Electronics	5	Technicians of Electronic Applications	TE15
16	Chemistry	2, 4, 5, 6	Sheet Metal Technicians	TE16
17	Agriculture	6	Technician of Agri-food Societies and Agricultural Holdings	TE17
17	Agriculture	6	Technician of Floriculture and Landscape Architecture	TE17
17	Agriculture	6	Technician of Arboriculture and Horticulture	TE17
A student may choose to lengthen its period of study for an optional (additional) secondary education year of a Specialist Programme (Specialty), also known as Fourth Grade.; Approximate equivalence for Greek names are the Cycles (Greek: Κύκλοι), Fields (Greek: Κλάδοι), Specialist Programmes (Τμήματα Ειδίκευσης) or shortened to Specialties.; Specialist Programme (Fourth Grade, Year 4) has only specialist courses (subjects) and is only for Integrated Multifarious Lyceum (EPL) graduates.; The Integrated Multifarious Lyceum (EPL) (1985–1997) was a selective school only.

== Criticism and controversies ==
- Corruption in Greece in the public sector was believed to hold the first place in of all EU countries, Greece being the most corrupt country in the European Union, a survey revealed in 2012. The Greek public schools lack a human resource development, having huge corruption at all education levels according to the Global Corruption Barometer. According to the 2020 Corruption Perceptions Index reported by Transparency International, Greece is the 59th least corrupt country out of the 180 countries worldwide, scored 50% corruption out of 100%, of the perceived level of public level corruption on a scale of 0 (highly corrupt) to 100 (clear).
- Accounts of reports of the Greece National Transparency Authority (EAD; formerly Inspectors-Controllers Body for Public Administration; SEEDD) show criminal offences, complaints, lawsuits and criminal prosecutions against public school educators and directors who were found to commit violations; using profane, obscene, or ethnically offensive language; organized crime activities; fraud; personal data theft; use of handphone and other unauthorised electronic and mobile devices during curriculum time; sexual abuse assault from students and educators; corruption; forgery; extortion; illegal fees; embezzlement of school funds; bullying.
- Greece was controversial for its legal disciplinary measure of school corporal punishment because was widely used and allowed in public schools, performed by school educators under the Principal's express authority, until it was banned in 1998 at primary schools and in 2005 at secondary schools. The physical punishment took place in front of all students consisted in the form of caning the buttocks of a student with a paddle or strap, caning on the palm of the hand with a wood stick, hitting a student's face, expulsion set in the school outdoor courtyard in the cold winter.
- The former government agency of ΟΕΕΚ (Οργανισμός Επαγγελματικής Εκπαίδευσης και Κατάρτισης; English: Organization for Vocational Education and Training; which replaced by Εθνικός Οργανισμός Πιστοποίησης Προσόντων και Επαγγελματικού Προσανατολισμού; ΕΟΠΠΕΠ; English: National Organization for the Certification of Qualifications and Vocational Guidance; EOPPEP) had embezzled €6,000,000 of European Commission funds. Since 30 July 2010, an official investigation on the criminal conspiracy theft began from the EU Council of the EU Charter of Fundamental Rights and European Convention on Human Rights.
- One out of the three public school students in Greece have received physical violation and abuse include verbal at 56.5 percent, followed by physical abuse at a rate of 30.5 percent and the threat of social exclusion at 27.8 percent. Greece ranks 4th place of student bullying amongst Europe countries according to the 1st European Anti-Bullying Network Conference, "Bullying and Cyberbullying Across Europe", Conference Proceedings, Athens, 2015 EAN (Ευρωπαϊκό Δίκτυο κατά του Σχολικού Εκφοβισμού).
- The tuition fee requirement from the most Greek Higher Education Institutes (HEIs) postgraduate programmes is contrary and entirely violating the Constitution of Greece, that all Greek citizens (and certain foreigners who live and work in the country) are entitled to free education on all levels at state educational institutions. The same violation act was done from the founding (law 2009/1992) of the Institutes of Vocational Training (IEKs) where all public IEK students were required to pay up to €367 statute fee for every semester up until the 2012–2013 academic year, that has been repealed since 2013–2014 academic year (article 22, law 4186/2013).

== See also ==
- Educational stage
- Education in ancient Greece
- Open access in Greece
