= Surgical treatment of ingrown toenails =

Medical procedure

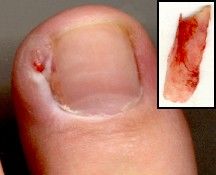
A toe post wedge resection with an image of the removed nail

Surgical treatments of ingrown toenails include a number of different options. If conservative treatment of a minor ingrown toenail does not succeed or if the ingrown toenail is severe, surgical management by a podiatrist is recommended. The initial surgical approach is typically a partial avulsion of the nail plate, known as a wedge resection, or a complete removal of the toenail. If the ingrown toenail recurs despite this treatment, destruction of the germinal matrix with phenol is recommended. As an alternative, one may use 10% sodium hydroxide which is less toxic or trichloroacetic acid which may give faster healing time. Antibiotics typically are not needed when surgery is performed.

== Wedge resection ==
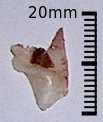
A resected wedge from the left side of the left big toe, shown to scale

Toe healing process after nail removal

The physician will perform a wedge resection in which the nail growing into the skin along the edge is cut away (ablated); the offending nail piece is pulled out and any infection is surgically drained. This process is also referred to as a simple surgical ablation; but it is not permanent (i.e., the nail will re-grow from the matrix). The entire procedure is performed in a surgeon's office, usually in about a half-hour (+/-), depending upon the extent of the problem. It is typically an out-patient procedure: the patient goes home the same day and recovery time varies from two to several weeks barring complications such as infection. As follow-up, the doctor may prescribe an oral or topical antibiotic and/or special soaking-baths for an interval of time after surgery. Some surgeons use the procedure lateral onychoplasty, a wide wedge resection, as the method of choice. It results in total cleaning avulsion (removal) of the nail matrix, and has a nearly 100% success rate.

Some practitioners avoid complete/total nail avulsion (removal) except for extreme circumstances: they may remove both sides of a toenail (even if only one side is ingrown), then coat the nail matrix on both sides with a chemical, usually phenol (carbolic acid), to prevent re-growth. This leaves most of the nail intact but ensures that ingrowing nail will not recur. There is possible failure of this procedure if the nail matrix is not coated, allowing it to re-grow. The underlying condition can become symptomatic if the nail grows back too quickly: the nail matrix could be growing a nail that is too wide, thick, or too curved, or is otherwise irregular. Further, the toe is subject to injury by concussion, twisting walk-motions, tight socks (including pressure stockings), or because the nail is growing incorrectly (likely too wide). This prospect of continued injury can mean chronic nail ingrowing, and chronic pain. The solution is usually edge avulsion with the adjunct procedure of phenolisation.

== Avulsion ==
In case of recurrence after complete removal – and if the patient did not feel pain before inflammation occurred – the condition may likely be onychia (disease or deformity of the nail), which is often confused with ingrown nail disease (onychocryptosis). Complete removal of the whole nail may be indicated and is a simple procedure. Local anaesthetic is injected and the nail is removed quickly by pulling it outward from the toe. This procedure is less complex than the wedge resection and can typically be performed in about 20 minutes. The patient can function normally soon after the procedure and most discomfort resolves in a few days. Typically, the nail-less toe does not look like a normal toe. Nail varnish or fake nails can be applied to the area to provide a more normal appearance.

The nail may grow back, however, and it can become ingrown again. It may grow back too wide, too thick, or deformed, or it can be injured by concussion; all which can result in chronic ingrowing nails, causing chronic pain. Accordingly, the surgeon may coat the nail matrix with a chemical (usually phenol), intending that none of the nail will grow back again. This is known as a permanent or full nail avulsion – also known as full matrixectomy, phenolisation, or full phenol avulsion. In a few cases the first procedure is not successful and has to be repeated. Podiatrists routinely warn patients of the possibility of regrowth.

== Vandenbos ==
The Vandenbos procedure was first described by Vandenbos and Bowers in 1959 in the US Armed Forces Medical Journal. They reported on 55 patients, all without recurrences. Since 1988 Dr. Henry Chapeskie has performed this procedure on over 2,700 patients who had no recurrences. Unlike other procedures, the Vandenbos procedure does not touch the nail. In this procedure, the affected toe is anesthetized with a digital block and a tourniquet is applied. An incision is made proximally from the base of the nail about 5 mm (leaving the nail bed intact) then extended toward the side of the toe/toenail in an elliptical sweep to end up under the tip of the nail about 3–4 mm in from the edge. It is important that all the skin at the edge of the nail be removed. The excision must be adequate leaving a soft tissue deficiency measuring 1.5 × 3 cm. A portion of the lateral aspect of the distal phalanx is occasionally exposed without fear of infection. Antibiotics are not necessary as the wound is left open to close by secondary intention. Postoperative management involves soaking of the toe in warm water 3 times/day for 15–20 minutes. The wound is healed in 4–6 weeks. No cases of osteomyelitis have been reported. After healing, the nail fold skin remains low and tight at the side of the nail. The rationale is that the nail itself is usually healthy, but overgrown by skin; when walking, the bilateral nail folds are pressed upwards, which is why narrowing the nail causes excessive recurrences, contrary to narrowing the nail fold.

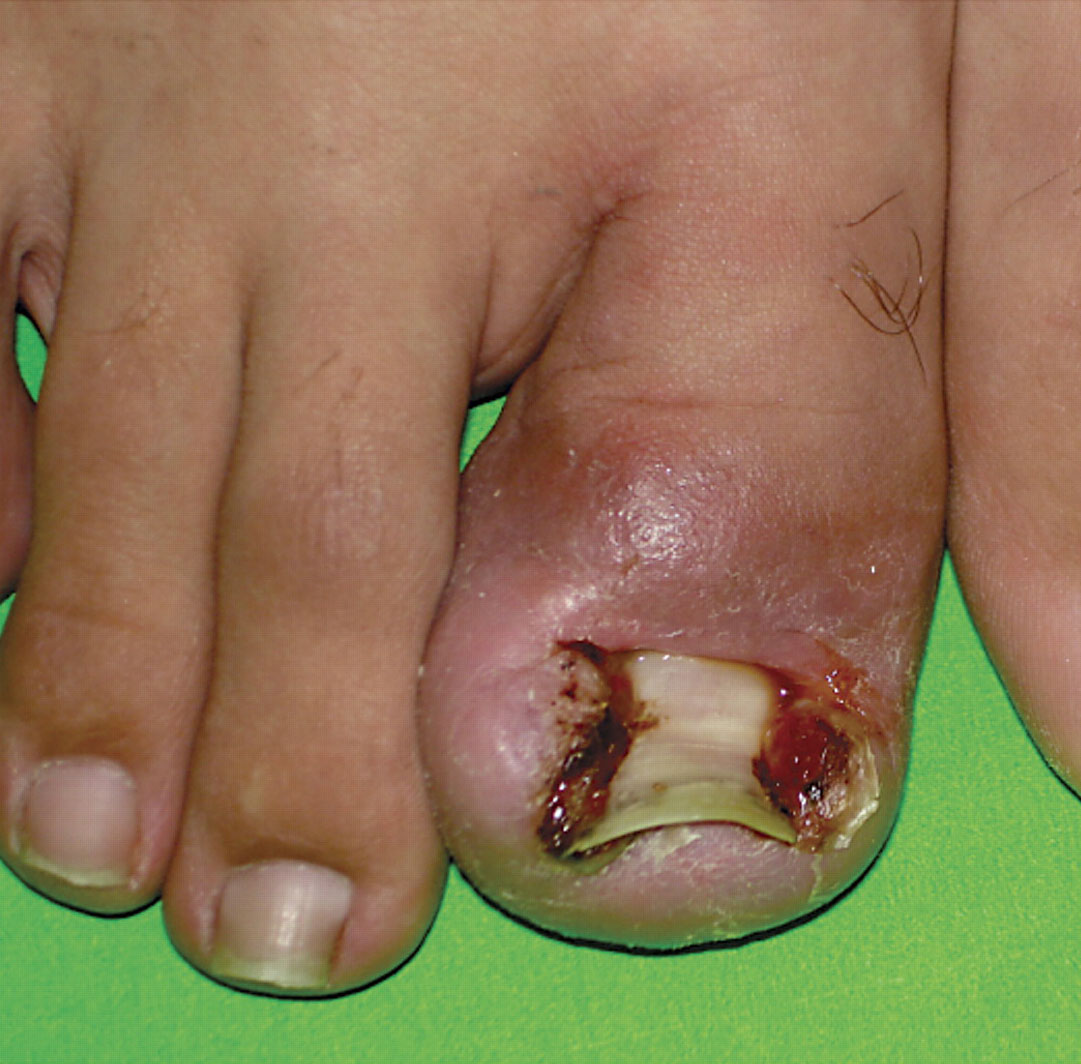
Ingrown toenail before Vandenbos procedure

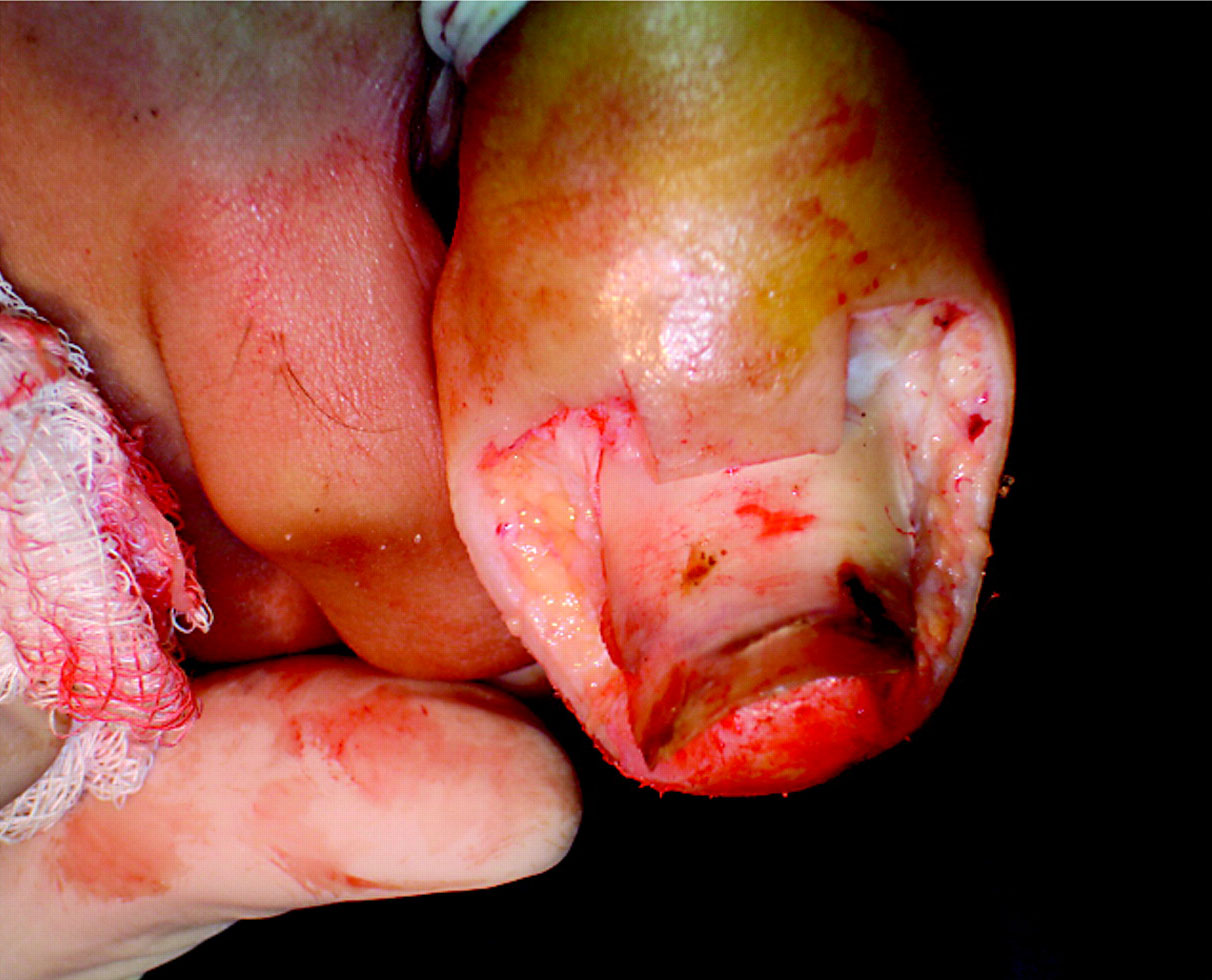
Intraoperative toe (ingrown toenail) during the procedure

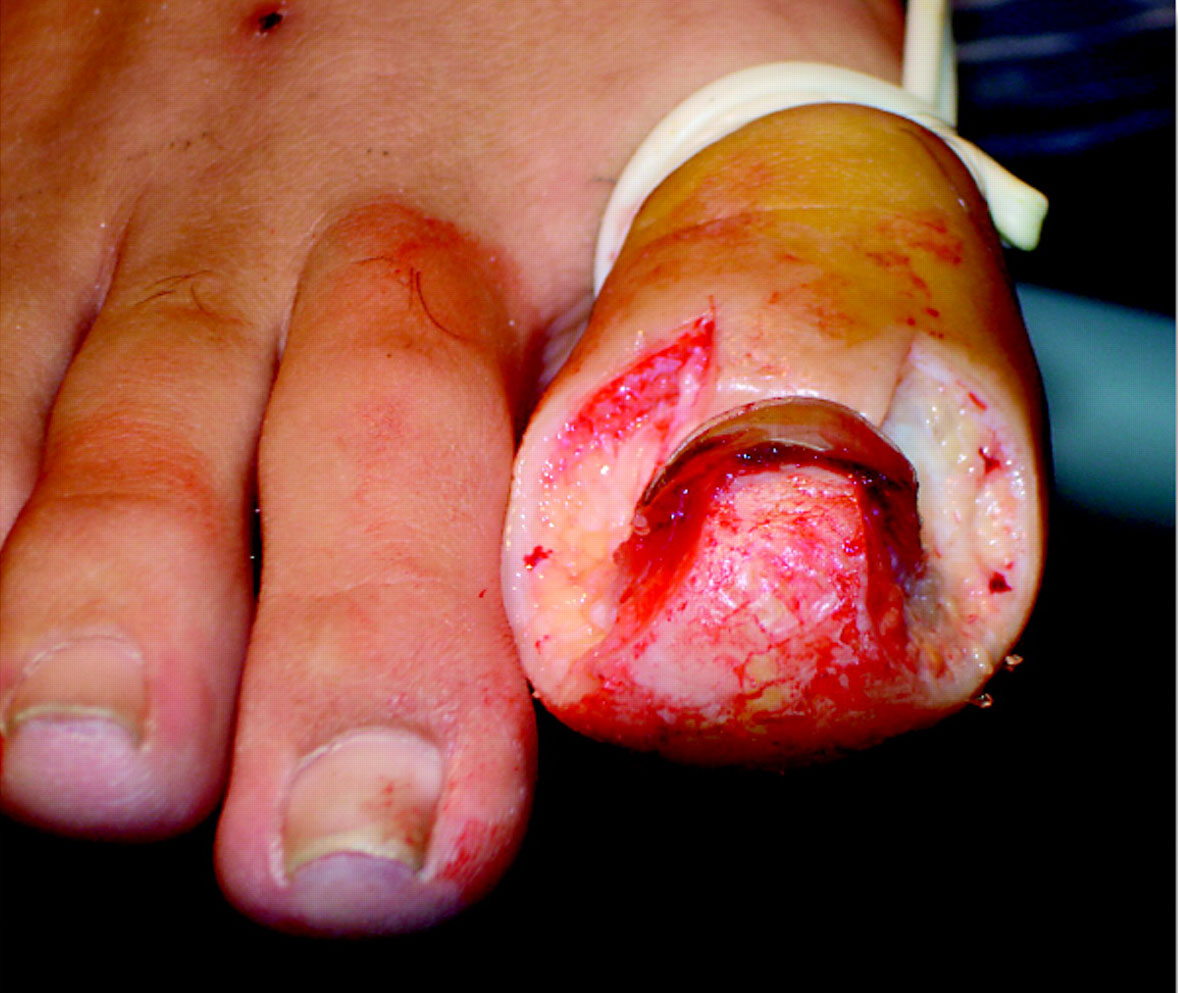
Intraoperative toe (ingrown toenail) during the procedure

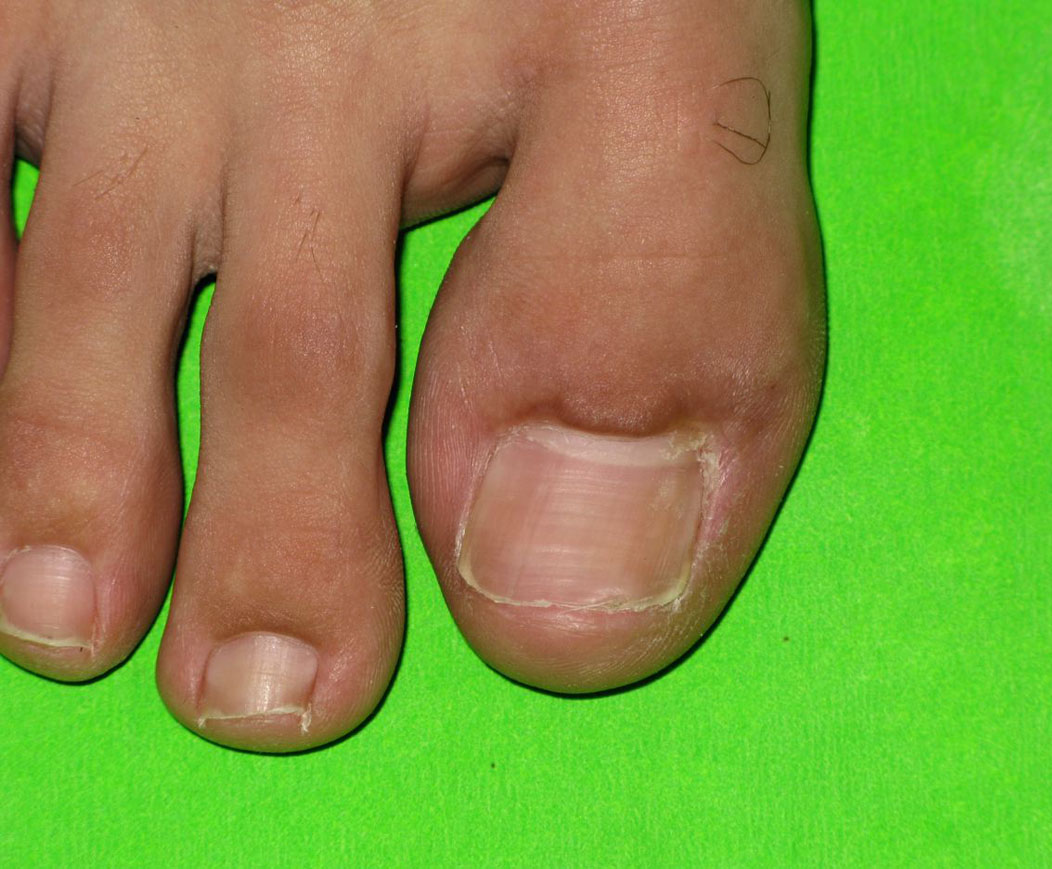
Healed ingrown toenail after Vandenbos procedure

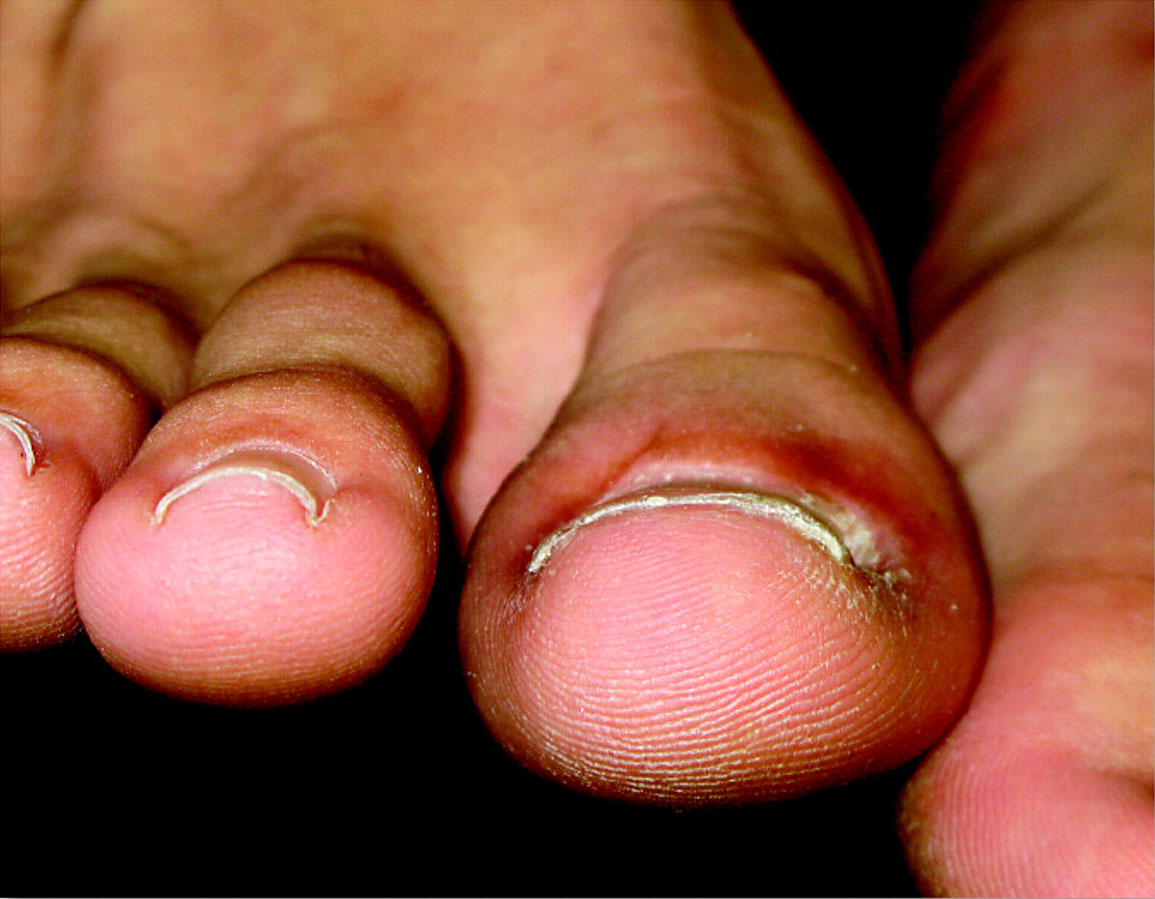
Healed ingrown toenail after Vandenbos procedure

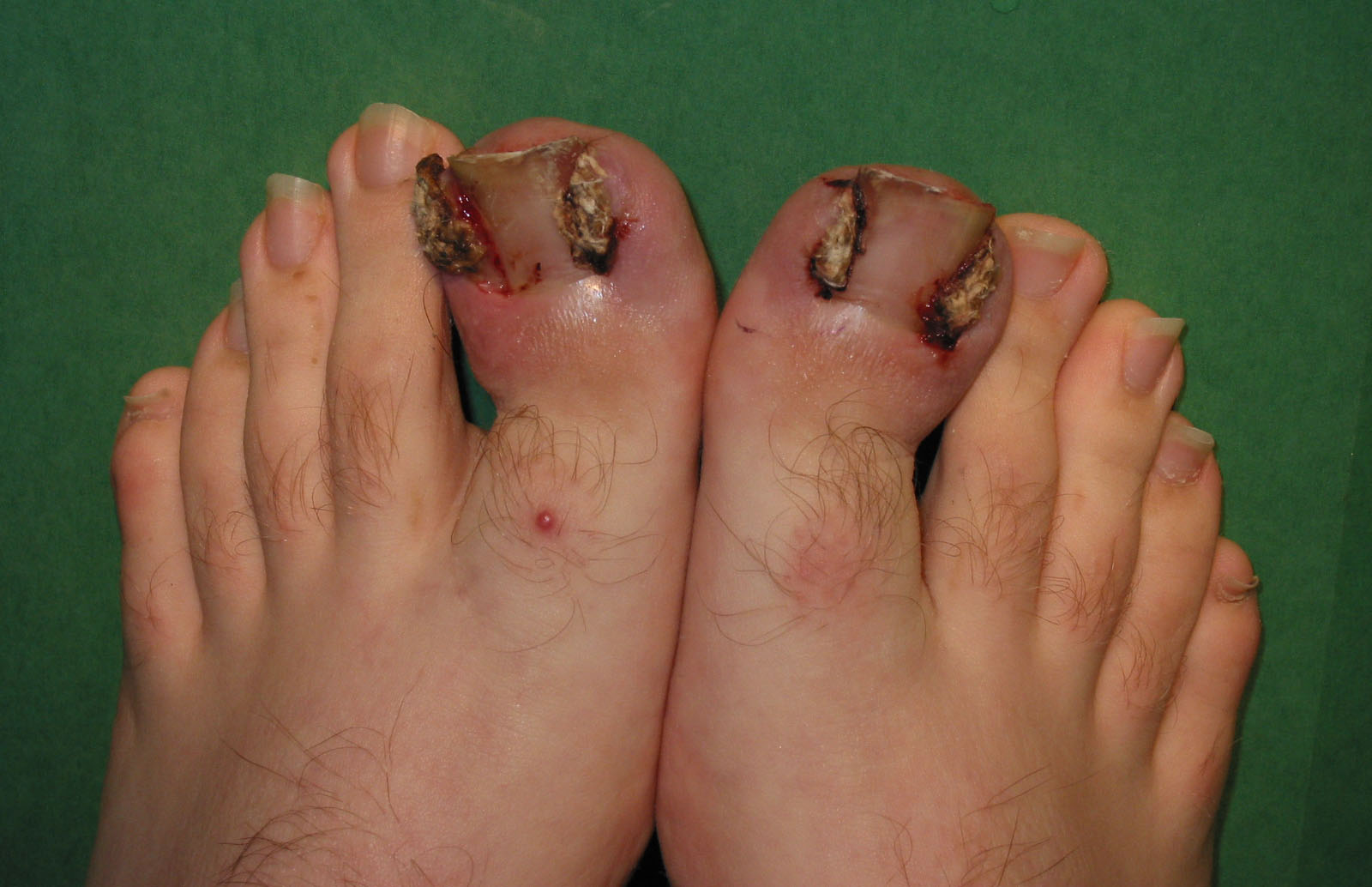
Ingrown toenail before Vandenbos procedure

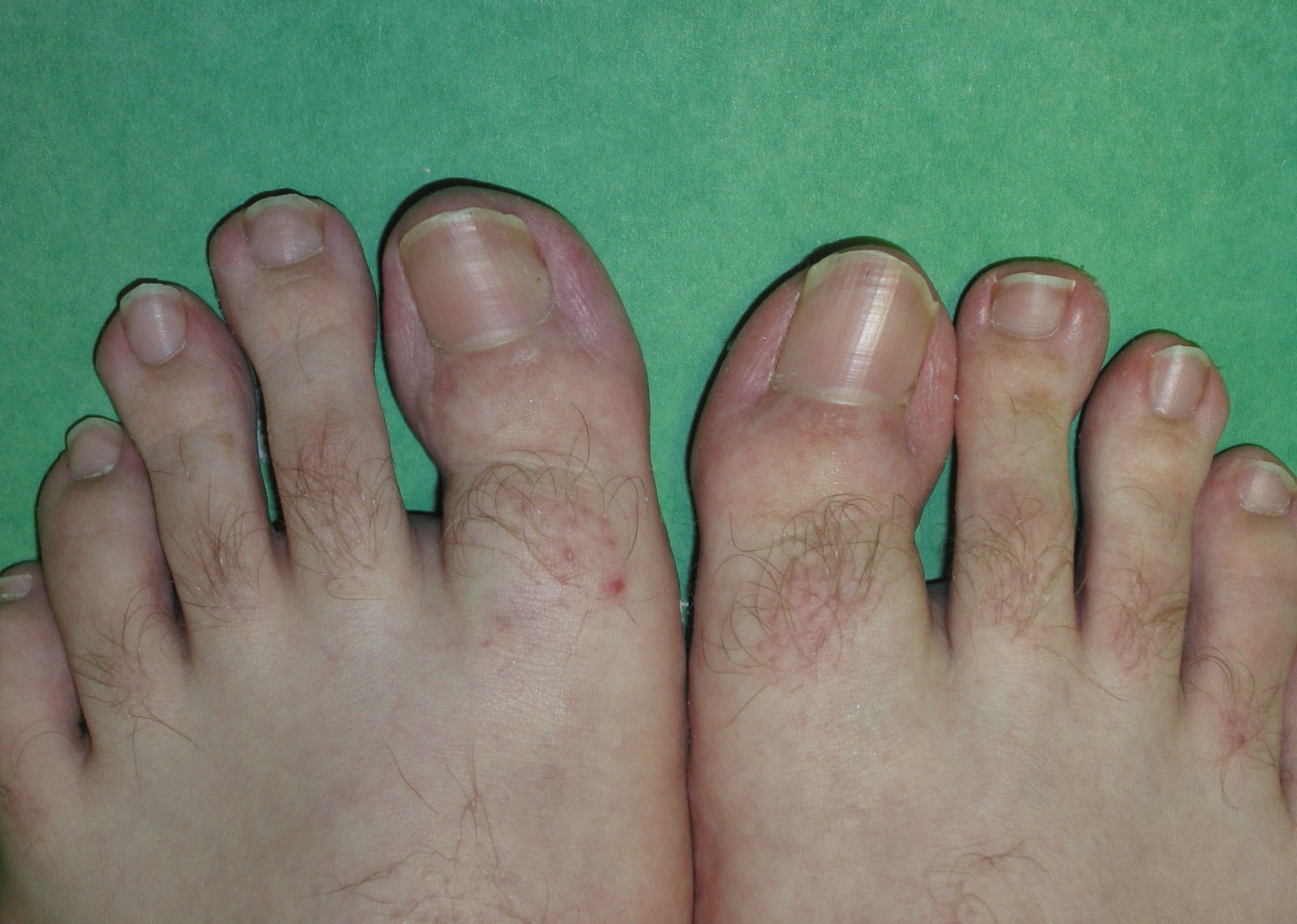
Healed ingrown toenail after Vandenbos procedure

== Syme ==
In difficult or recurrent cases of onychocryptosis (ingrown toenail) the patient's symptoms persist necessitating a permanent operative solution. The "avulsion procedure" is simple but the surgeon must be skilled enough to accomplish total destruction, and removal of, the nail matrix. Another disadvantage is the long healing and recovery time(> 2 months). In these cases, the best method is the Syme procedure, that means total nail matrix removal + skin flap transfer + phalanx partial osteotomy + stitching.

== Phenolisation ==
Following injection of a local anaesthetic at the base of the toenail and perhaps application of a tourniquet, the surgeon will remove (ablate) the edge of the nail growing into the flesh and destroy the matrix area with phenol to permanently and selectively ablate the matrix that is producing the ingrown portion of the nail (i.e., the nail margin). This is known as a partial matrixectomy, phenolisation, phenol avulsion or partial nail avulsion with matrix phenolisation. Also, any infection is surgically drained. After this procedure, other suggestions on aftercare will be made, such as salt water bathing of the toe. The purpose of the procedure is to prevent re-growth where the matrix was cauterized. After the procedure, the nail is slightly narrower (usually one millimeter or so) and is barely noticeable a year later. The surgery is advantageous because it can be performed in the doctor's office under local anesthesia and recovery time is minimal. There is no visible scar on the surgery site and a nominal chance of recurrence. However, if the phenol is improperly or inadequately applied, the nail matrix can regenerate from its partial cauterization and grow a new nail. This will result in a recurrence of the ingrown nail in approximately 4–6 months as the skin that the original ingrown nail grew under would also recover from the procedure. The recovery of the skin on either side of the nail is standard in this type of procedure. Many patients who have a minor recurrence of the ingrown nail often have the procedure performed again. However, in cases of severe recurrence, a podiatrist can perform the procedure again or resort to a more involved, permanent solution such as removal of the entire nail or the Vandenbos Procedure.
