= National Centre for Public Administration and Local Government =

Strategic agency of Greece

National Centre for Public Administration & Local Government
- Εθνικό Κέντρο Δημόσιας Διοίκησης και Αυτοδιοίκησης (ΕΚΔΔΑ)
- Abbreviation: EKDDA
- Formation: 1983
- Legal status: Public legal entity
- Headquarters: Athens, Greece
- Location: Greece
- Parent organization: Minister of Interior
- Website: ekdd.gr

The National Centre for Public Administration and Local Government (Greek: Εθνικό Κέντρο Δημόσιας Διοίκησης και Αυτοδιοίκησης, ΕΚΔΔΑ) it is the strategic agency of Greece for the training and education of public servants and local government employees. It was established in 1983, and it is a Public Legal Entity supervised by the Minister of Interior.

It comprises the National School of Public Administration and Local Government (ESDDA) (Εθνική Σχολή Δημόσιας Διοίκησης και Αυτοδιοίκησης (ΕΣΔΔΑ)), Training Institute (INEP) (Ινστιτούτου Επιμόρφωσης (ΙΝΕΠ)) and the Documentation, Research and Innovation Institute (ITEK) (Ινστιτούτου Τεκμηρίωσης και Καινοτομιών (ΙΤΕΚ)).

== Purpose ==
Its main mission is the development of the Human Resources of the Public Administration and Local Government, the creation a body of specialized officials of the Public Administration with comprehensive professional training about the staffing of central administration, state regional administration and local government, the improvement of the functioning of the public services and of the public agents through research on the documentation and through consulting support, life-long learning through certified training.

== Administration ==
The administration bodies of EKDDA are: the President, the Vice President and the Administration Board, consisting of EKDDA President, EKDDA Vice President, the Directors of the Educational and Scientific Units of EKDDA, the Head of the General Directorate of Human Resources Management of the Public Sector of the Ministry of Interior, five Experts and the representatives of the Association of Greek Regions (ENPE in Greek), the Central Union of the Municipalities of Greece (KEDE in Greek), the Greek Civil Servants’ Confederation (ADEDY in Greek), the Hellenic Association of the Employees of Local Government Organizations (POE-OTA in Greek) and the Graduates’ Association from the National School of Public Administration and Local Government (ESDDA in Greek).

== Studies ==
Students of the current Educational Series of ESDDA come from Legal, Humanitarian, Financial, Political, Science Schools and Technical University Schools. Apart from the courses, in the framework of the Curriculum, educational actions, visits, lectures, meetings and other acts relating to special topics of the programme and/or interdisciplinary and innovative approaches to Public Administration issues are carried out. The internship of ESDDA students is an integral part of the educational process. It is held in public bodies and bodies of the broader public sector in Greece and abroad and its aim is to familiarize the students with the work flow in the specific services. The School’s students are obliged, in the framework of the Curriculum, to prepare a thesis and get into traineeship in public bodies and services. Each employee has the right to submit two participation applications per semester and attend up to three training programs per year.

Training Institute (INEP) has training programs in the following:

- Public Administration & Governance
- Economy & Fiscal Policy
- Human Rights & Social Policy
- Sustainable Development
- Information Science & Digital Services
- Cultural & Tourist Development

ESDDA curriculum is structured along five fields:

- 1st Field: Law
- 2nd Field: Economy
- 3rd Field: Public Administration
- 4th Field: Digital Governance
- 5th Field: Foreign languages

== See also ==
- Minister of Interior
- Education in Greece
