= Frontistirio =

A frontistirio (plural: frontistiria) is a prevalent type of private cram school in Greece. In Greece, frontistiria are divided into two categories, which can either be a facility where students are grouped in classes, or private tutoring.

Most Greek secondary education students whose families can afford the significant fees attend a frontistirio, because of the high difficulty of university entrance exams in Greece. It is generally considered impossible for all but the most gifted students to pass university entrance exams without this extra help. An even more expensive alternative is to hire private teachers who tutor the students at home (usually one teacher per subject).

They are used not only for university admission exams, but like other counterparts in countries such as South Korea and Hong Kong, many students in Greece that attend middle school or the first grade of high school (as the preparatory courses for the university exams begin in the 2nd grade of high school), due to the low quality of the education system in Greece. Now, frontistiria are starting to become common among primary school students, sometimes even in the first classes.

As of 2021, they are very common in Greece, and there are even entire companies which are active solely in this sector, such as the Poukamisas company that administers more than 70 branches around the country.

Nowadays, frontistiria and private teachers who cater to university students are also becoming common.

== See also ==
- Cram school
- Education in Greece
- Hagwon
