= Onychoplasty =

Technique of nail reconstrction

Onychoplasty or nail reconstruction is a therapeutic process aimed at reconstituting or partially substituting the natural nail through the application of a synthetic resin or gel prosthesis, in order to protect the nail matrix, facilitate regrowth, correct curvature, or compensate for the after-effects of trauma or nail pathology.

== Objectives ==
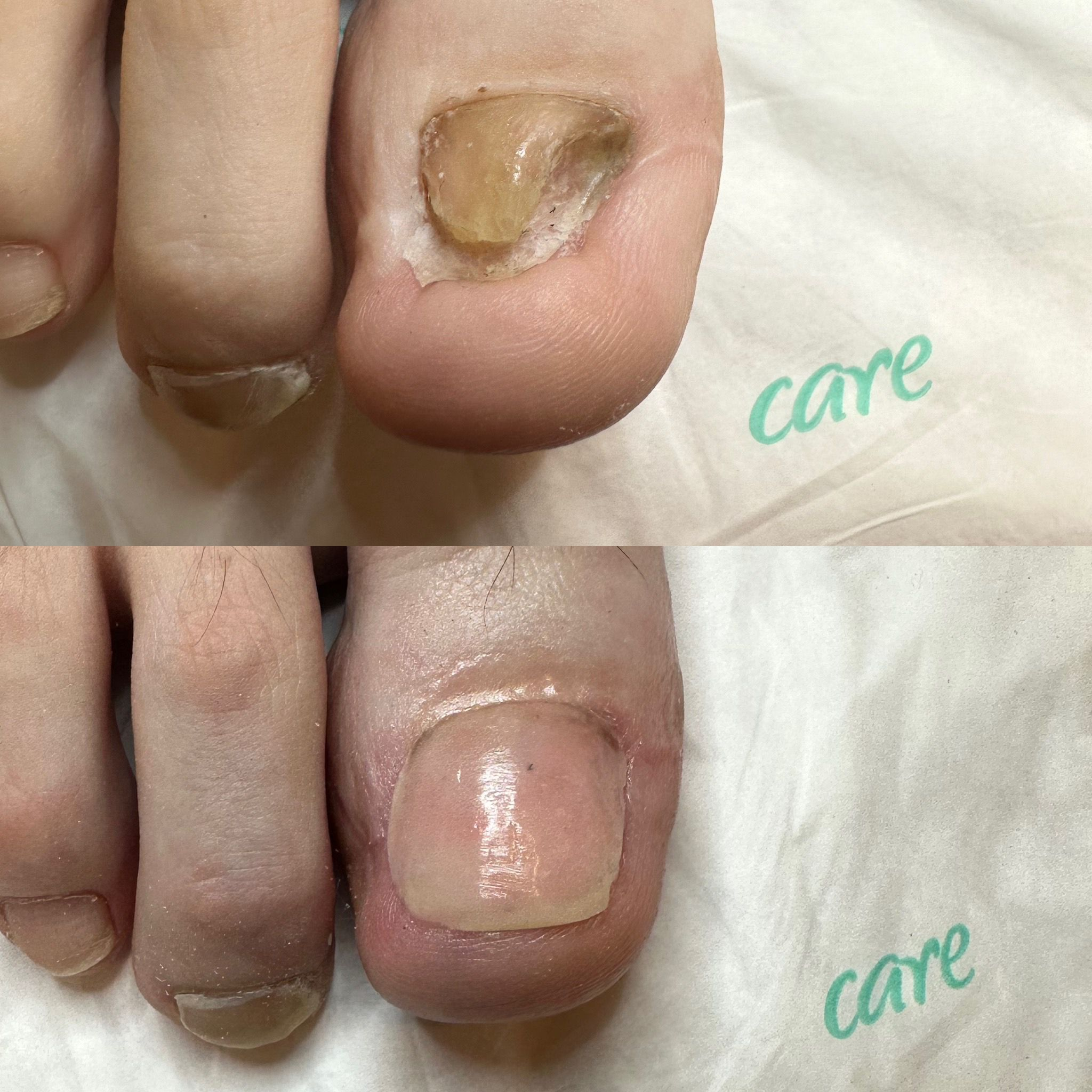
Photograph showing, at the top, a foot before treatment, and at the bottom, after treatment.

The objectives of onychoplasty are the following:

- to protect the phalanx and the periungual area (sulcus).;
- to restore aesthetics in cases of partial or total nail loss (onycholysis or onychoptosis), subungual hematoma, or fragile nail;
- to guide regrowth into the proper alignment and correct abnormal curvature (over-curvature, risk of ingrown nail).

== Nail reconstruction techniques ==
There are two main nail reconstruction techniques. In both cases, the nail plate is replaced or rebuilt with a prosthesis made of resin or composite. In general, the materials used come from the dental field and have been adapted for podiatry. The first technique, used by most professionals, consists of reconstructing the nail plate with a prosthesis made of photopolymerizable resin. This resin hardens through exposure to UV rays on the prosthesis. This can be harmful to the skin, since UV rays are carcinogenic. The results vary between a pink or white color.

Another technique consists of reconstructing the nail plate with a prosthesis made of composite that hardens under LED light. The health risks are non-existent. This therapeutic technique is carried out in three steps: nail bed, free edge, and then nail plate. This technique was patented by podiatrist Manuel Enrique Toral Bardina in various countries such as Brazil, Canada, Spain, Chile, and the United States
