= Libre Space Foundation =

Greek non-profit space exploration foundation

- Formation: 2015; 11 years ago
- Type: Nonprofit
- Legal status: Foundation
- Purpose: Space exploration
- Location: Athens, Greece
- Website: libre.space

The Libre Space Foundation (LSF) is a Greek non-profit organization dedicated to developing open-source technologies for space exploration. It was founded in 2015 by the creators of SatNOGS, a global network of satellite ground stations, now operated by the foundation. In 2017 it launched its first satellite, UPSat, (Note: In collaboration with the University of Patras.) which was the first satellite manufactured in Greece and the first satellite made entirely with open-source software and open-source hardware. As of November 2025, it has gotten four more satellites to orbit, two of which are currently operational, while working on other projects as well, such as designing and manufacturing a hybrid-fueled sounding rocket.

== Background ==
In 2014 the founders of the Libre Space Foundation participated in NASA's SpaceApps Challenge at the Athens Hackerspace with their SatNOGS project, an open source network of ground stations. They didn't win but competed in another competition the same year, the Hackaday Prize, which they won and were awarded about $200.000. With that money they founded the Libre Space Foundation.

== Satellites ==
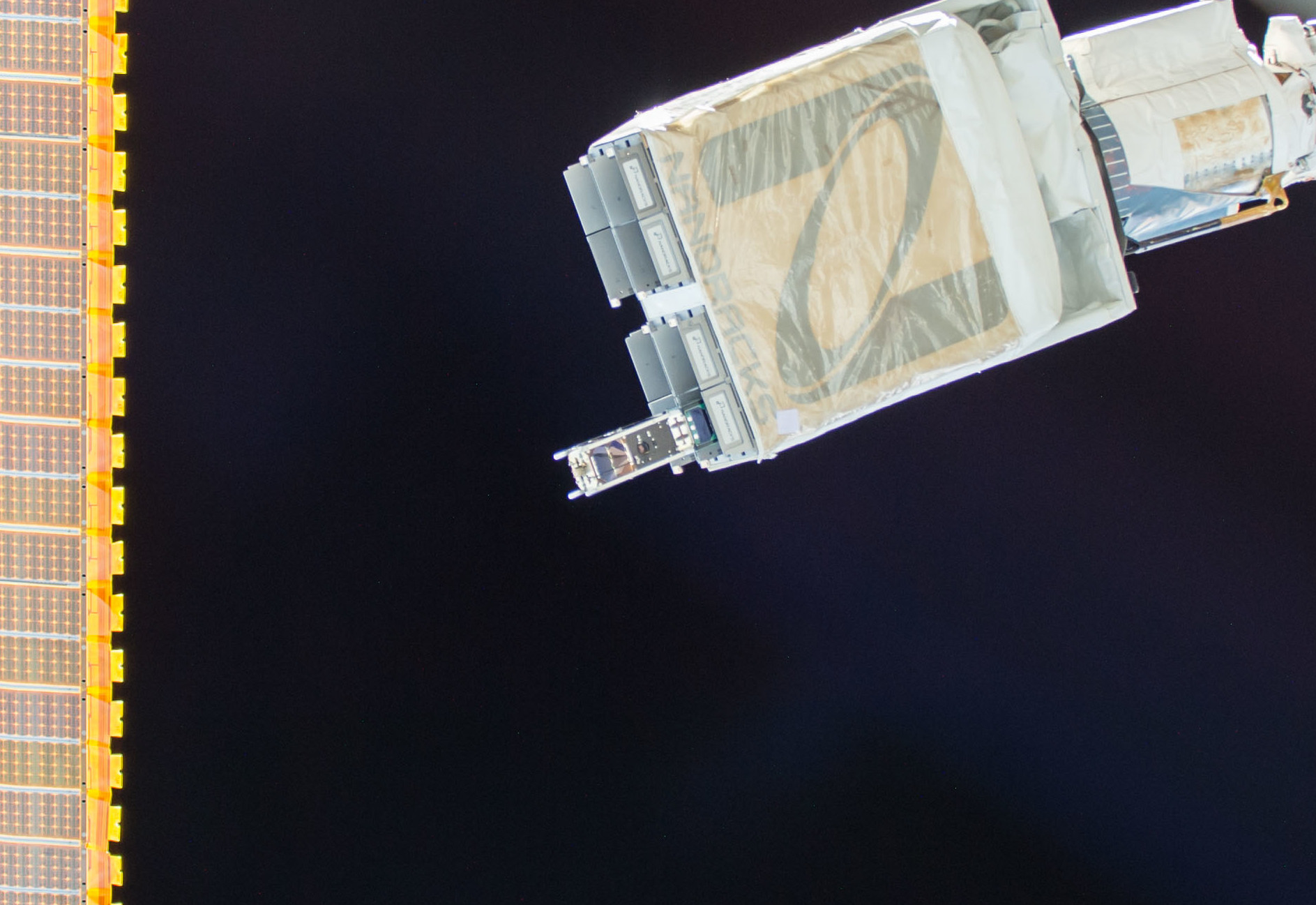
UPSat being deployed from the Nanoracks CubeSat Deployer on the ISS

=== UPSat ===
UPSat was a project of the Libre Space Foundation in collaboration with the University of Patras to launch a 2U Cubesat participating in the QB50 mission to study Earth's thermosphere. It was the first satellite manufactured in Greece and the first satellite in history made entirely with open-source software and open-source hardware. It was launched on 18 April 2017 to the International Space Station with the Cygnus OA-7 resupply mission and it was deployed on 18 May from the Nanoracks CubeSat Deployer. It carried a multineedle Langmuir probe to sample the electron density of the space around it. UPSat's lifetime was three months.

=== QUBIK series ===
QUBIK is a series of PocketQubes designed and manufactured by Libre Space Foundation along with PicoBus, a satellite deployer, with both QUBIK and PicoBus made with open-source software and open-source hardware. QUBIK-1 and QUBIK-2 were launched with a PicoBus deployer in September 2021 as part of Firefly Aerospace's DREAM payload program for the first flight of their Firefly Alpha rocket. However, the launch was a failure and the rocket failed to reach orbit. QUBIK-3 and QUBIK-4 along with another PicoBus were launched a year later in October 2022 on Firefly Alpha's second flight, which got in a lower orbit than planned resulting in the satellites re-entering into the atmosphere a few days later. The Libre Space Foundation reported that PicoBus successfully deployed the satellites and that they were operating perfectly for two days before their re-entry.

=== PHASMA ===
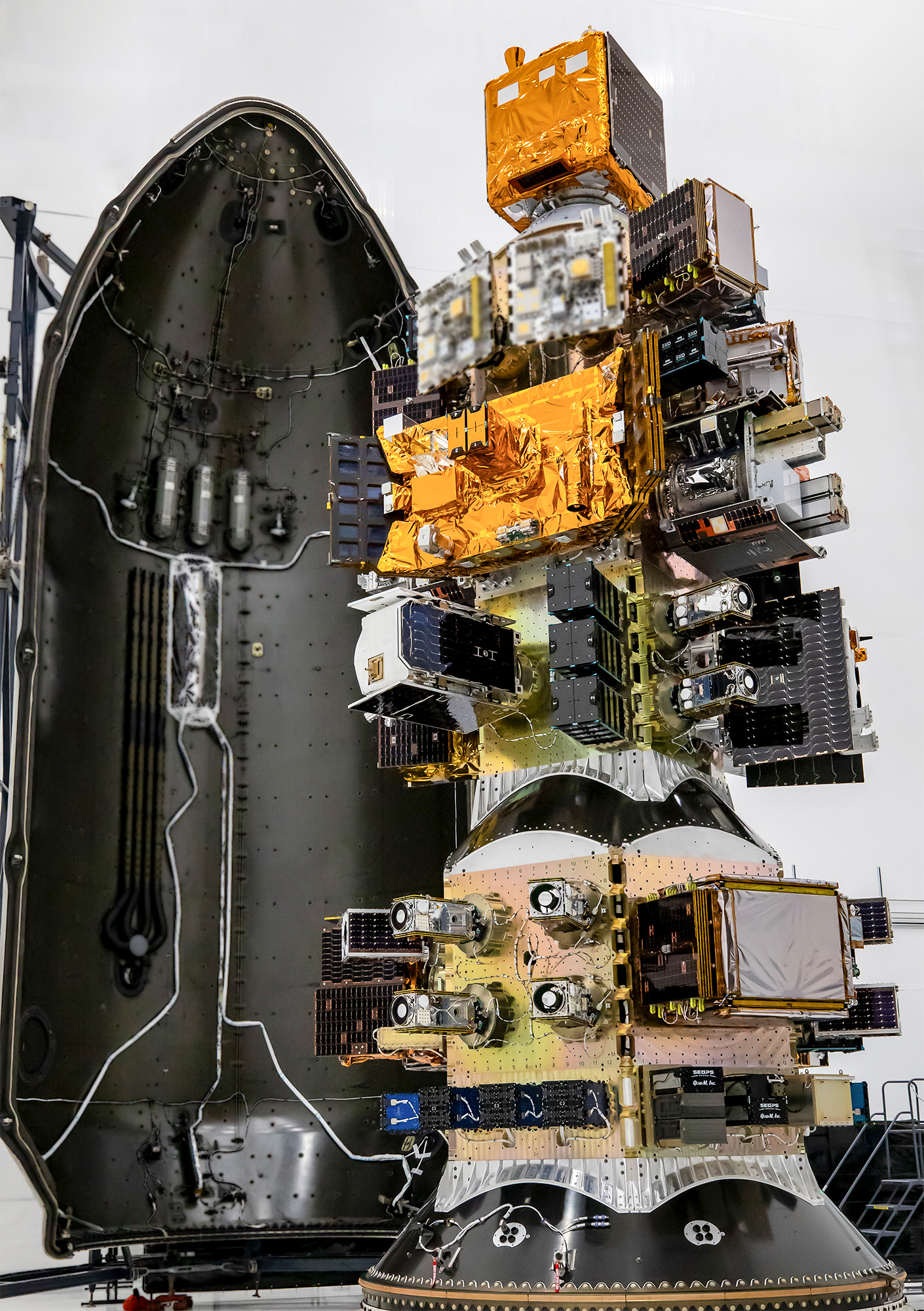
The Transporter-15 Mission before launch

PHASMA is a CubeSat mission consisting of two satellites that use radio-frequency signals to provide space-based situational awareness by monitoring terrestrial and satellite signals. They were both launched by a SpaceX Falcon 9 on 28 November 2025 as part of the Transporter-15 Rideshare Mission. Initial reports from 2023 stated that the mission would consist of three satellites, but their number was later reduced to two. They are two identical 3U CubeSats, named LAMARR (after Hedy Lamarr) and DIRAC (after Paul Dirac), flying in close proximity of each other. The mission is supported by ESA's Greek CubeSat In-Orbit Validation program and the Libre Space Foundation received 2 million euros for its development.

== Other projects ==
=== SatNOGS ===
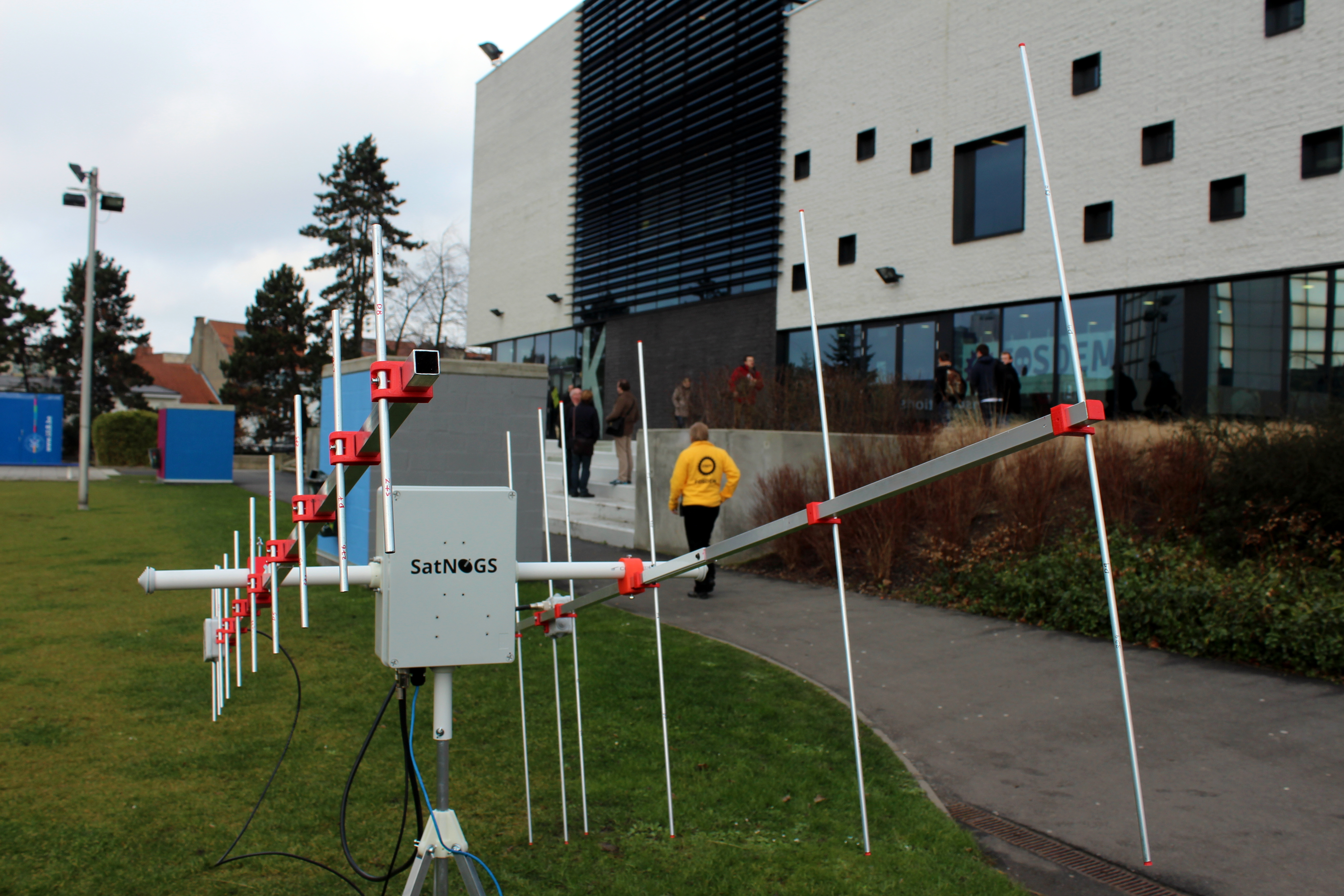
A SatNOGS version 2 station deployed during FOSDEM 2015

SatNOGS is a global ground stations network and open source platform for communicating with satellites. It consists of more than 500 stations and it has collected over 15 million satellite observations. It was created prior to the founding of the Libre Space Foundation, for the in NASA's SpaceApps Challenge in 2014 at the Athens Hackerspace and in the same year it won the first prize at the Hackaday Prize competition. Libre Space Foundation was created with the money from that prize.

=== SIDLOC ===
SIDLOC (Spacecraft Identification and Localization) is an experiment of the Libre Space Foundation that aims to speed up the process of identifying and locating spacecraft by transmitting a broad-spectrum signal spread out over a large radio bandwidth, that will then be received by SatNOGS which using the Doppler effect will identify the spacecraft's location. The first SIDLOC was launched into space in July 2024 on Ariane flight VA262, the first flight of the Ariane 6 rocket, while the second one is planned to be launched by Rocket Factory Augsburg.

=== Cronos rocket ===
Cronos is a sounding rocket designed and manufactured by White Noise, a team of university students from the National Technical University of Athens, in close collaboration with and under the auspices of the Libre Space Foundation. It will have a hybrid-propellant engine fueled with paraffin wax and nitrous oxide. Its goal is to lift 4kg of deployable payload mass to an altitude of 3 kilometers above ground level. It is estimeted to produce 3000N of thrust for approximately 3 seconds, reaching a maximum speed of 0.88 Mach. It is designed to be fully reusable by ejecting two parachutes by utilizing CO2 cartridges.

=== SatNOGS-COMMS ===
SatNOGS-COMMS is an ultra-high frequency (UHF) and S-band radio transceiver for spacecraft in Earth's orbit, featuring tight integration with the SatNOGS Network. The first SatNOGS-COMMS was used for Curium One, a 12U CubeSat by Planetary Transportation Systems in partnership with the Libre Space Foundation, which launched in July 2024 on Ariane flight VA262. SatNOGS-COMMS will also be used on the spacecraft for the PHASMA mission of the Libre Space Foundation.

=== Software ===
The Libre Space Foundation has created Polaris, an open-source tool used for the analysis of satellite telemetry data by building machine learning models, using data from SatNOGS. Other projects include two Makerspaces funded by the European Space Agency, the Optical MakerSpace for topics related to optical communications and photonics, and the SDR MakerSpace for topics related to software-defined radio technologies for space communications. The Libre Space Foundation has also created MetaSat, an open metadata schema to link the data, software, and hardware of small satellite missions, in collaboration with the Harvard and Smithsonian Center of Astrophysics Walbach Library.
