= Hackerspace.gr =

Hackerspace in Athens, Greece

Coordinates: 37.99910°N 23.70653°E

- Hackerspace.gr logo
- Formation: 2011
- Type: Non-profit
- Purpose: Hacking
- Location: Greece
- Origin: Athens
- Founders: Evangelos Balaskas, Pierros Papadeas, Nikos Roussos
- Website: Hackerspace.gr homepage

Hackerspace.gr ('hsgr') is a hackerspace in Athens, Greece, established in 2011. It operates as a cultural center, computer laboratory and meeting place (with free wireless access). Hackerspace.gr promotes creative coding and hardware hacking through its variety of activities. According to its website: "Hackerspace.gr is a physical space dedicated to creative code and hardware hacking, in Athens".

== Organization ==
Hackerspace.gr vision is inspired by the open-source philosophy. The main values, according to its vision page, are Excellence, Sharing, Consensus, and Do-ocracy. It is a self-funded community, through a membership fee, individual donations and supporters. Every year Hackerspace.gr publishes its annual financial balance titled "The cost of Hacking".

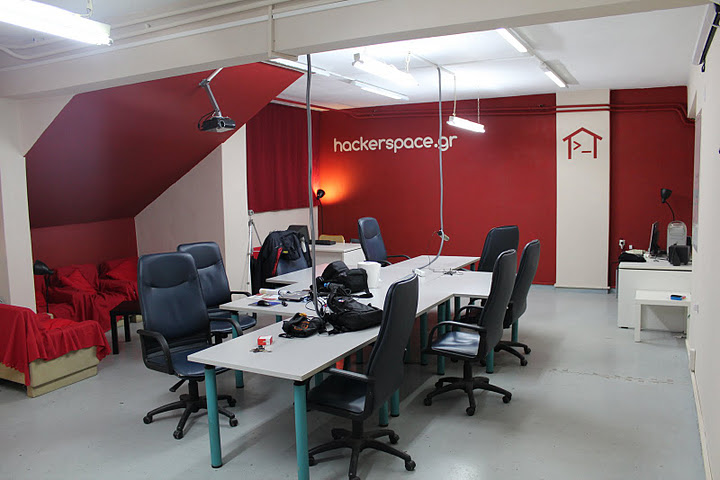
An overview of Hackerspace.gr main lab

It organizes workshops, lectures, entertainment and informational events. The events calendar lists several events weekly. Furthermore, hackerspace.gr is open for visitors as long as any of the administrators are in the premises. Hackerspace.gr is an incubator place for many projects. Currently there is an OpenROV Taskforce on Hackerspace.gr. Verese community, a project participating on Mozilla WebFWD, is hosting its regular meetings at Hackerspace.gr. Ardupad was also incubated at Hackerspace.gr. A USB drop is located in the central area of the hackerspace. A custom open hardware delta 3D printer design, Anadelta is developed to cover its members need for a large 3D printer.

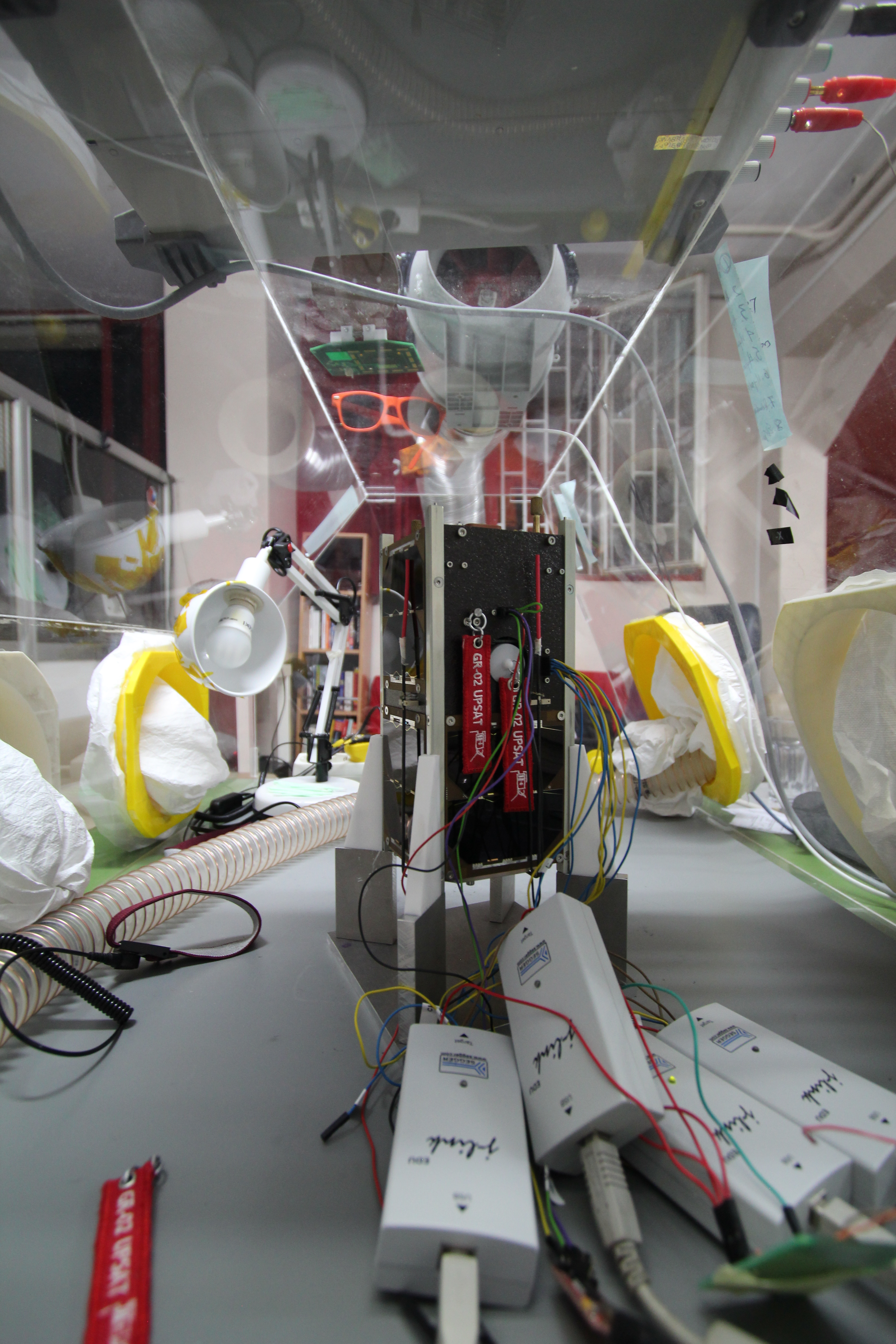
UPSat testing in hackerspace.gr

== Libre Space Foundation ==
hackerspace.gr is utilized as the headquarters of Libre Space Foundation, an open space technologies non-profit, as its laboratory and main working space. Libre Space Foundation shares its testing and manufacturing equipment with hackerspace.gr's users and visitors.

Libre Space Foundation has deployed its first SatNOGS ground station on the rooftop of hackerspace.gr and has used its machine, and electronics facilities for the manufacture, integration and initial testing of UPSat the first open source satellite, and also the first satellite made in Greece.
