= SatNOGS =

Network of satellite ground stations

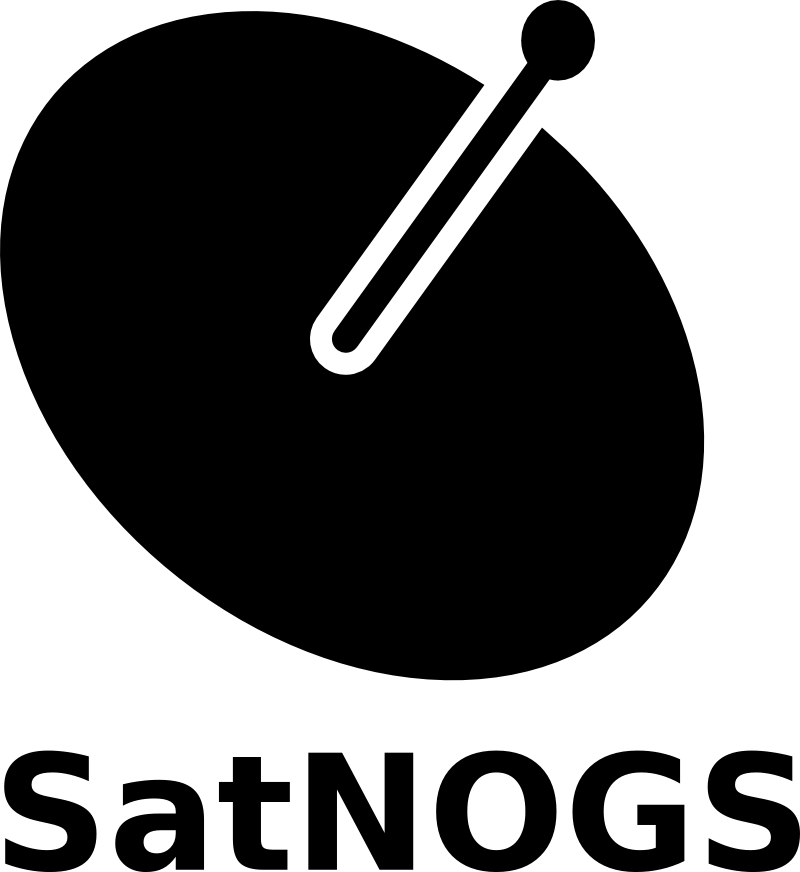

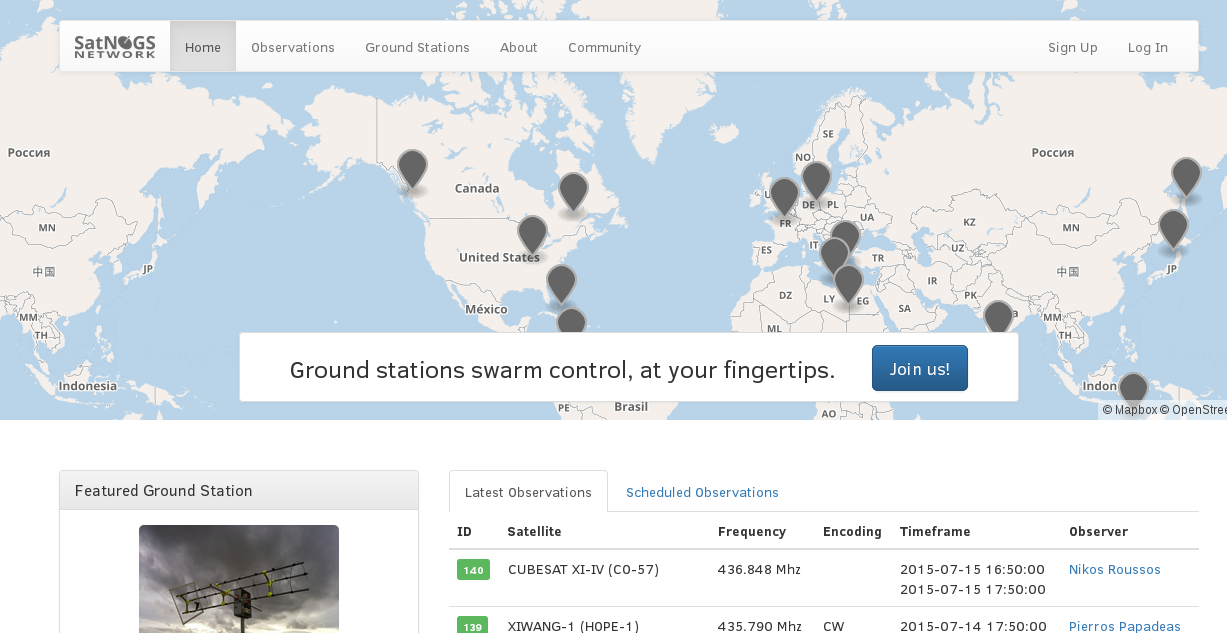
- Developer: Libre Space Foundation
- Release: April 2014; 12 years ago
- Type: Satellite Ground Station Network
- License: GNU GPL v3+, AGPL, CERN Open Hardware License
- Website: satnogs.org
- Repository: gitlab.com/librespacefoundation/satnogs

SatNOGS (Satellite Networked Open Ground Station) project is a free software and open source hardware platform aimed to create a satellite ground station network. The scope of the project is to create a full stack of open technologies based on open standards, and the construction of a full ground station as a showcase of the stack.

== History ==
The SatNOGS project was initiated during NASA SpaceApps Challenge in 2014 at Athens Hackerspace. The project then took part in and won first place of the Hackaday Prize 2014 competition. SatNOGS is currently a project of the Libre Space Foundation.

== Overview ==
SatNOGS aims to provide a stack of technologies needed for a distributed network of low Earth orbit satellite ground stations. In order to implement such a stack the four following different sub-projects are developed

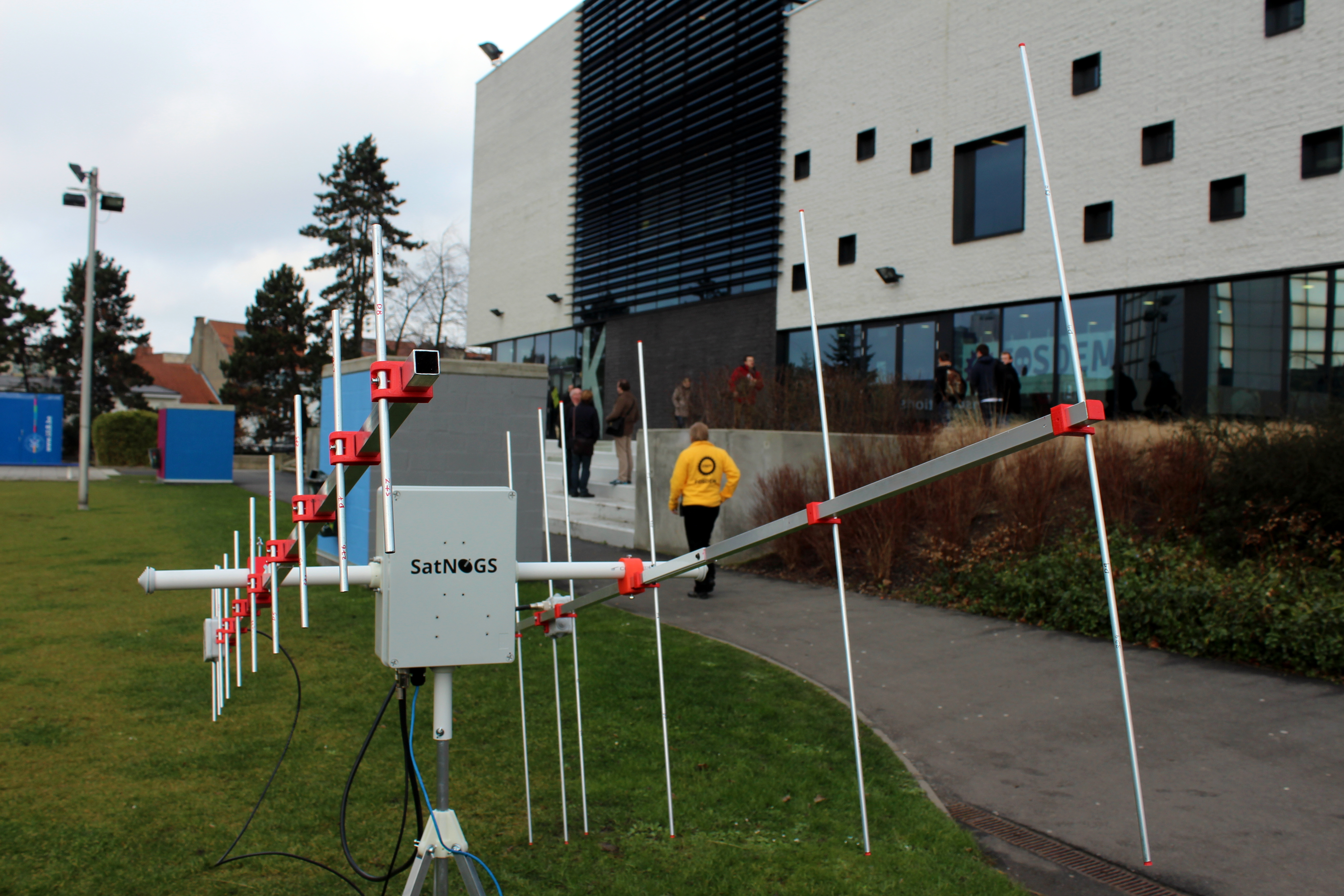
SatNOGS version 2 ground station deployed during FOSDEM 2015

=== Network ===
SatNOGS Network is a web application for scheduling observations across the network of ground stations.

=== Database ===
SatNOGS Database is a crowd-sourced application allowing its users to suggest satellite transmitter information for currently active satellites. Its data is available via an API.

=== Client ===
SatNOGS Client is the software to run on ground stations, usually on embedded systems, that receives the scheduled observations from the Network, receives the satellite transmission and sends it back to the Network web app.

=== Ground Station ===
SatNOGS Ground Station is an open source hardware ground station instrumentation with a rotator, antennas, electronics and connected to the Client. It is based on 3D printed components, readily available materials.

== Operation ==
A November 2019 SatNOGS blog post summarizes total statistics since establishment:

- 300+ operational ground-stations
- 12,000,000+ observations
- 380+ satellites with 810+ transmitters monitored
- 51,000,000+ data frames

== Tracking ==
The global array of ground stations contributes to an effective network for monitoring orbital satellites.

The European Space Agency utilized the SatNOGS network to gain initial status observations from the OPS-SAT CubeSat after launch in December 2019.

== See also ==
- UPSat
