= TLT =

TLT may refer to:

== Organizations ==
- Tallinna Linnatranspordi AS, an Estonian transportation company

== Transportation ==
- Tai Lam Tunnel, a transport tunnel part of Route 3 in Hong Kong
- Tuluksak Airport, Alaska (IATA code TLT)

== Other uses ==
- Test loop translator, a type of radio frequency converter
- Timor Leste Time, the time zone of East Timor, UTC+9:00
- Sepa-Teluti language of Indonesia (ISO-639 code "tlt")
- The Living Tombstone, an Israeli-American electronic rock band on YouTube
- The Locked Tomb, a gothic horror/science fantasy novel series by Tamsyn Muir
- Trademark Law Treaty (1994)
