= International Journal on Artificial Intelligence Tools =

- Discipline: Artificial intelligence
- Language: English
- Edited by: Nikolaos Bourbakis

Publication details
- History: 1992-present
- Publisher: World Scientific (Singapore)
- Impact factor: 0.778 (2016)

Standard abbreviations
- ISO 4: Int. J. Artif. Intell. Tools

Indexing
- ISSN: 0218-2130 (print); 1793-6349 (web)

Links
- Journal homepage

The International Journal on Artificial Intelligence Tools was founded in 1992 and is published by World Scientific. It covers research on artificial intelligence (AI) tools, including new architectures, languages and algorithms. Topics include AI in Bioinformatics, Cognitive Informatics, Knowledge-Based/Expert Systems and Object-Oriented Programming for AI.

== Abstracting and indexing ==
The journal is abstracted and indexed in:

- Inspec
- Science Citation Index Expanded
- ISI Alerting Services
- CompuMath Citation Index
- Current Contents/Engineering, Computing, and Technology
