= Makarios Earth Station =

Makarios Satellite Earth Station is a ground station in Cyprus operated by CYTA that opened in 1980. The site is home to a large farm of earth station antennas operating with a range of satellites. Satellite links are provided in C, K_{u} and DBS frequency bands. The Ground station is staffed on a 24-hour basis for 365 days per year.
