= Ioannis Liritzis =

Greek archaeologist and physicist

- Born: 2 November 1953 (age 72); Delphi, Greece
- Education: University of Patras; University of Edinburgh
- Known for: Natural science, archaeometry
- Awards: Prize of Academy of Athens; Archaeometry Professorship Costa Navarino Prize
- Scientific career
- Fields: Archaeometry, physics
- Workplaces: University of the Aegean; Henan University

Ioannis Liritzis (Greek: Ιωάννης Λυριντζής; born 2 November 1953) is a professor of physics in archaeology (archaeological science) whose field of specialization is the application of natural sciences to archaeology and cultural heritage. He studied physics at the University of Patras and continued at the University of Edinburgh, where he obtained his Ph.D. in 1980. He has undertaken postgraduate work at the University of Oxford, Université Bordeaux III, the University of Edinburgh, and the Academy of Athens.

== Academic career ==
Liritzis is a professor of Archaeometry and natural sciences at Henan University in Kaifeng, China and was professor in archaeometry and natural sciences at the University of the Aegean. He directed and founded the Laboratory of Archaeometry in 1999 and the Laboratory of Environmental Archaeology. He was also director and initiator of the Masters course Applied Archaeological Sciences. He served as head of the Department of Mediterranean Studies at the University of the Aegean, a member of the University Senate, and a member of the Executive Committee of the National Recognition of Foreign Academic Diplomas. He worked at the Greek Ministry of Culture (1984–1989) and the Academy of Athens (1989–1999).

He has made contributions to several interdisciplinary research fields (geophysics, astronomy, planetology, paleomagnetism, paleoclimatology) and his work has been published in scientific journals such as Nature.

Liritzis is a member of the Academia Europaea, vice-president of the European Academy of Sciences and Arts, and a member of the World Academy of Art and Science.

== Work ==
Liritzis is known for developing two dating methods. In 1994, he introduced surface luminescence dating, which extended the principles of optical dating and thermoluminescence dating to carved rock surfaces (granite, basalt and sandstone) from ancient monuments and artifacts. In 2002, he introduced a new approach to obsidian hydration dating based on the surface saturation layer and the SIMS profile of hydrogen (SIMS-SS method). Both methods have since been refined and extended by other scientists.

He has also made contributions in archaeoastronomy and in geophysics, including work on seismicity statistics and archaeomagnetism.

He initiated the Delphi4Delphi International Project.

Liritzis was elected as a membre correspondent de l'Académie des Sciences, Arts et Belles-Lettres de Dijon and a member of the European Academy of Sciences and Arts. He was awarded the Prize of the Academy of Athens for his book Archaeometry: Dating Methods in Archaeology (1986) and the Costa Navarino International Archeometry Award (2010) issued by the University of the Peloponesse. He held visiting positions at Henan University (China), University of California San Diego, and Edinburgh University.

He is the principal investigator who initiated and coordinates the Aegean University archaeological excavation project at Delphi and Kastrouli, a Late Mycenaean site near Delphi, Greece.

The archaeology and history of Egypt was introduced into Greek university curricula in the Department of Mediterranean Studies of the University of the Aegean in 1999. Liritzis established the chair and facilitated the appointment of the first lecturer in Egyptology in 2003. Protocols of collaboration were established between Egyptian universities and the University of the Aegean. The Heritage journal published an honorary volume upon his retirement, focusing on his contributions and collaboration with Egyptian researchers on the study of cultural heritage in Egypt.
