= Kentriko =

Village at Messenia Greece

Kentriko Κεντρικό
- Community
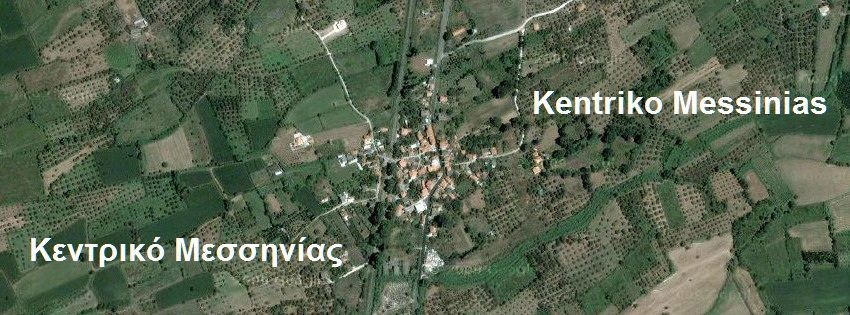
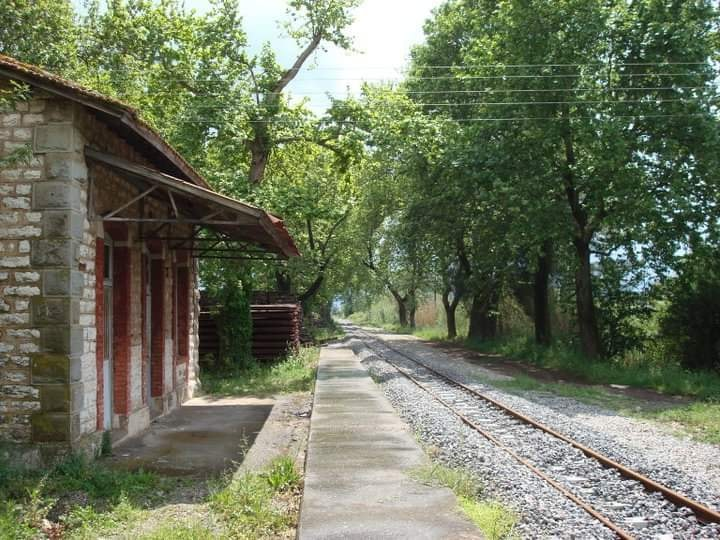
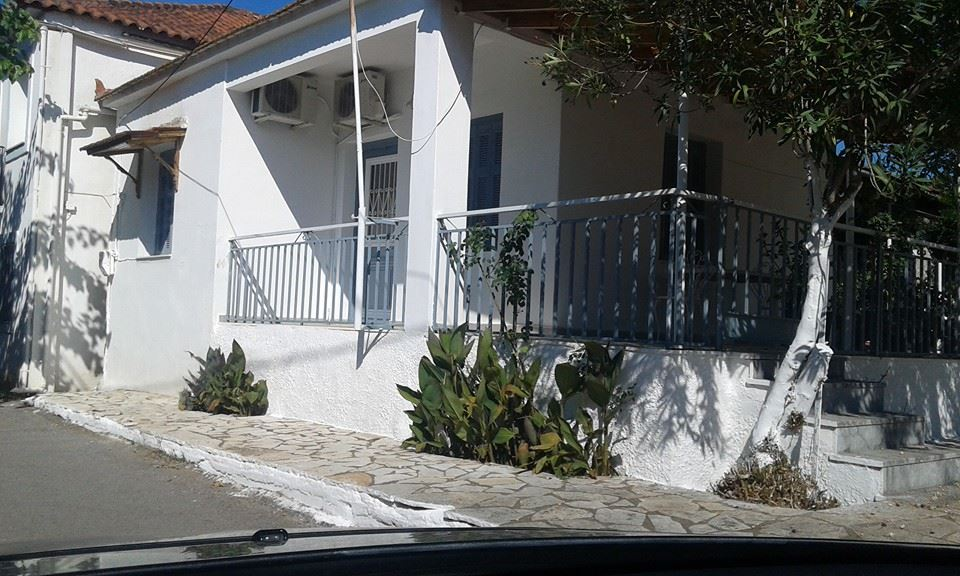
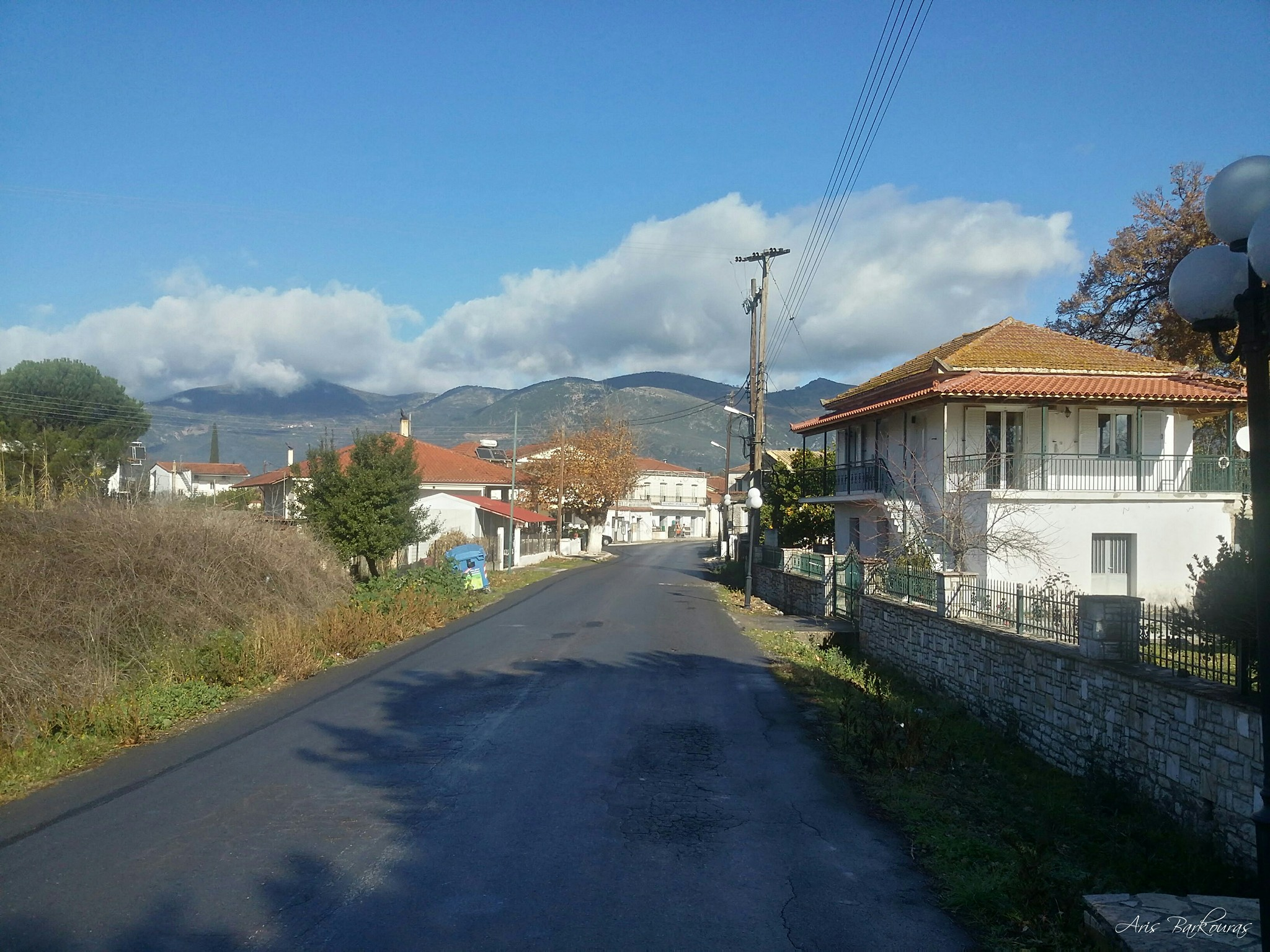

- Location within Greece
- Coordinates: 37°16′32″N 21°58′9″E
- Country: Greece
- Administrative region: Peloponnese
- Regional unit: Messenia
- Municipality: Oichalia
- Municipal unit: Andania
- Elevation: 80 m (260 ft)

Population (2021)
  - Community: 78
- Time zone: UTC+2 (EET)
  - Summer (DST): UTC+3 (EEST)
- Postal code: 240 08
- Area code: 27240
- Vehicle registration: KM

Kentriko (Greek: Κεντρικό [kentrikoˈ]) is a village in the municipal unit of Andania in the municipality of Oichalia of the Regional Unit of Messenia located in the Region of Peloponnese, according to the administrative division of Greece as formed by the Kallikratis Plan 2011 local government reform program. The official village name is "Kentrikon" (Greek: Κεντρικόν [kentrikoˈn]). The seat of the municipality is Meligalas and it belongs to the geographical division of Peloponnese. Until 2010, Kentriko belonged to the Local District of Kentriko, of the former Andania Municipality of Messenia Prefecture.

Kentriko has an altitude of 80 meters above sea level, at latitude 37.2756 and longitude 21.9693.

Kentriko today is surrounded by arable land and its 78 inhabitants (2021) are engaged exclusively in agricultural work. It is located 38 kilometers from the Messenia capital Kalamata, 35 kilometers from Kyparissia and only 6 kilometers from Meligalas.

== History ==
Kentriko is a small village built in the center of a plain, hence its name, near Polichni and Diavolitsi. Its oldest name until 1927 was Kato Kurtaga or simply Kurtaga. The name change is due to a decision of the then government to rename all the settlements that had Turkish-speaking names. According to the prevailing version, the name Kurtaga was taken from a Turkish official, namely Aga, with the name Kurt, who probably owned Tripoli during the Turkish occupation.

== Railway connection ==
Kentriko used to have railway connection with "Kentriko railway Station". Kentriko Railway station was an important railway station on the Kalamata–Tripoli line. In the early 20th century, it functioned as a hub because the Meligalas–Kentriko section of the railway had not yet been built. As a result, passengers traveling from Kalamata had to stop at Meligalas and use horse-drawn wagons to reach Kentriko in order to board another train continuing to Tripoli.

The station was closed along with the Kalamata–Tripoli line in 2010/2011. After Kentriko, the next station was Diavolitsi, while the preceding station was Zevgolatio, a key junction where the Athens–Tripoli–Kalamata line connected with the Athens–Patras–Kyparissia–Kalamata line.

The station building still exists today but is in poor condition. Inside, there was a ticket office and 2 other rooms used as waiting areas for passengers but mainly was for stuff and storage usage.Although the plans for the line's reopening do not explicitly mention Kentriko Station, it is reasonable to assume that the old train model used for the intercity trains to Athens will be employed. This means that only local trains would serve Kentriko while intercity ones serving Kalamata - Athens will stop at Zevgolatio

== Climate ==
Kentriko has a mediterranean climate (Köppen Csa) with mild, wet winters and dry, hot summers. It receives plenty of precipitation days in winter. Summers are very hot and dry.

== Cuisine ==
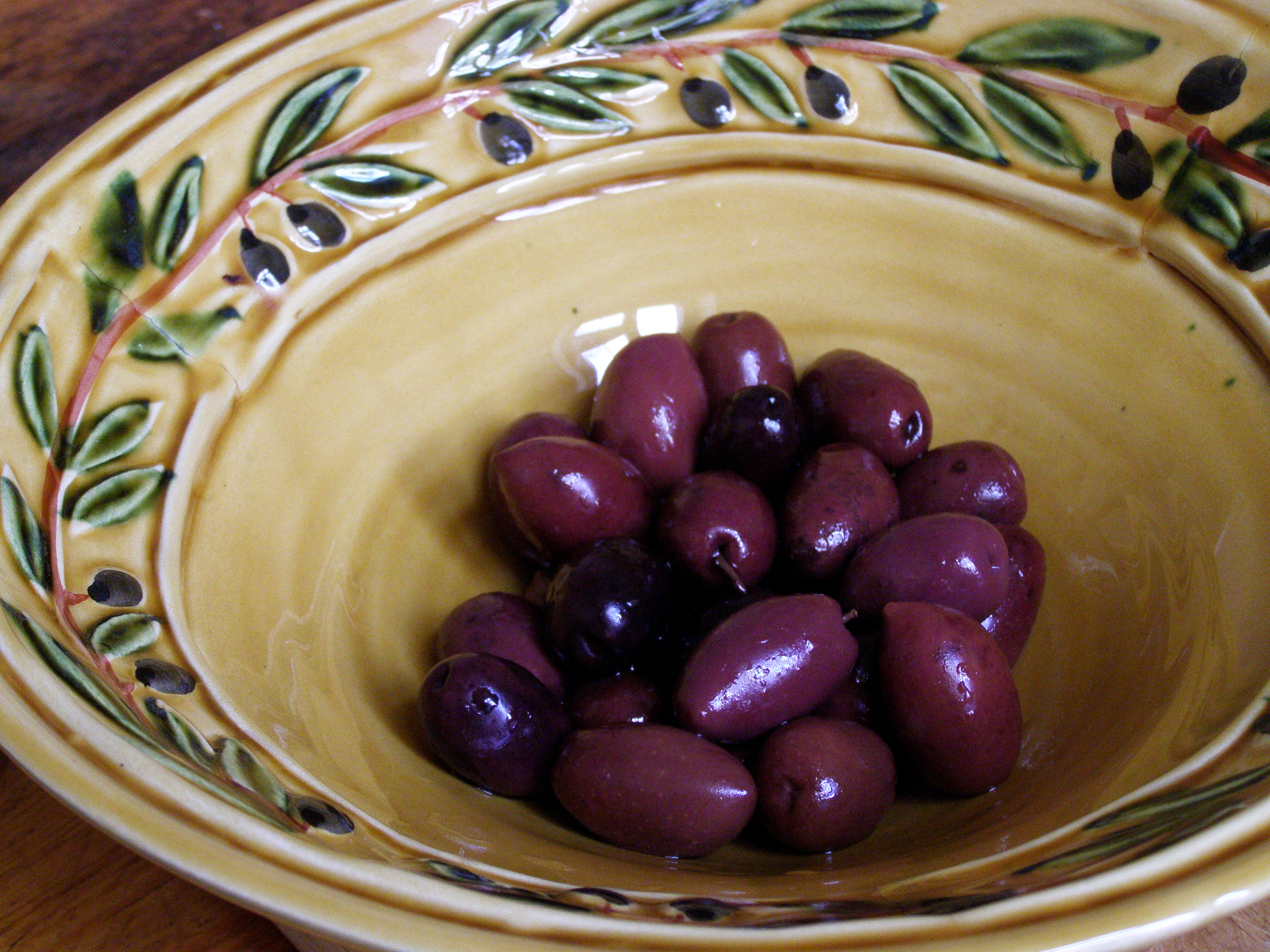
A plate with black Kalamata olives

Local specialities:

- Kalamata olives
- Lalagides local donuts
- Pasto salted pork
- Lokaniko with orange
- Petimezi
- Diples (dessert)
- Sfela goat cheese

== Notable people ==
- Michail A Karageorgis, 1899-1995, Shipowner
- George Anastasopoulos 1965-, Engineer
