= George Anastasopoulos =

Greek-American Engineer, PhD

Georgios (George) Anastasopoulos
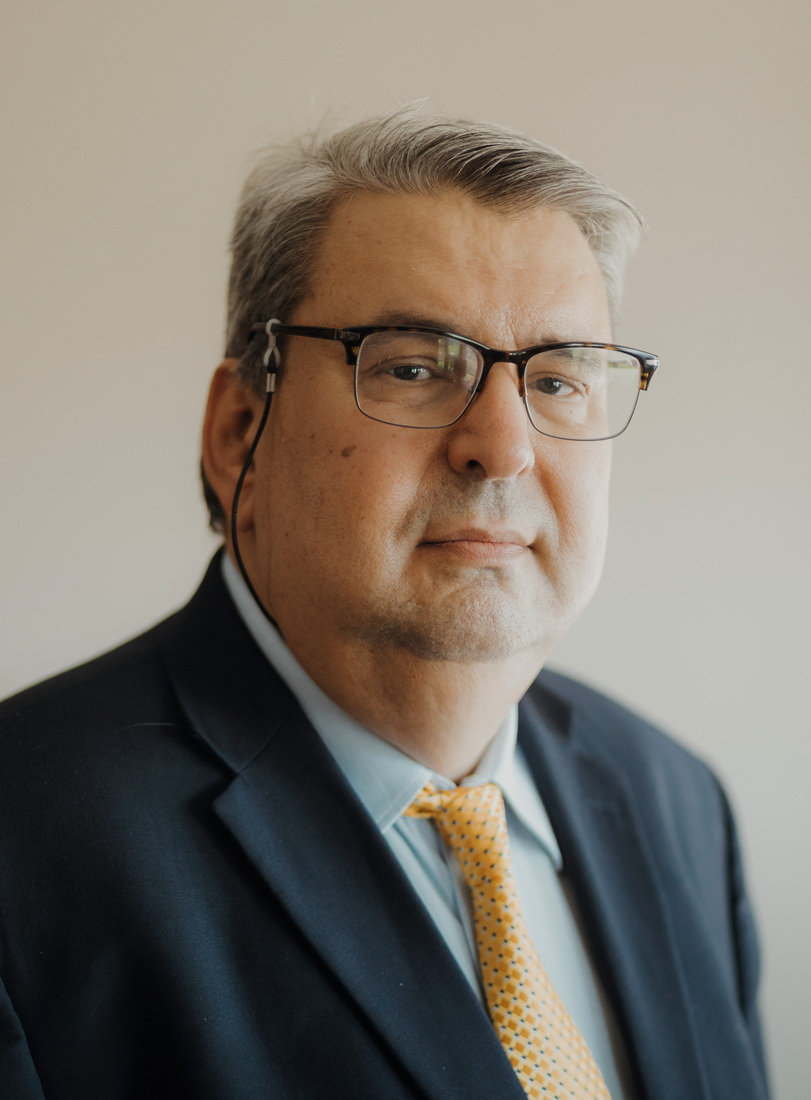
- Official portrait, 2022
- Born: February 7, 1965 (age 61); Athens, Greece
- Education: University of Patras and Northwestern University
- Occupation: Engineer
- Spouse: Vicky Karvela
- Children: Ioannis Anastasopoulos
- Writing career
- Notable awards: EOQ Georges Borel Award, 2015

Georgios (George) Anastasopoulos is a Greek–American Engineer, PhD, resident of Michigan, USA.

== Biography ==
Georgios (George) Anastasopoulos (in Greek: Γεώργιος Αναστασόπουλος) is born in Athens, Greece, on February 7, 1965. His father Ioannis Anastasopoulos (1929–2015), from Kentriko, Messenia, Greece, was a Mathematician and served as high-school principal. His mother, Nikoletta Pantazopoulou (1931–2015) was born at Filiatra, Messenia, Greece. He is married to Vasiliki Karvela, from Koroni, Messenia, Greece and they have one son, Ioannis Anastasopoulos, Mathematician.

In 2015, he was awarded by the European Organization for Quality (EOQ) the Georges Borel Award for international achievements being at the edge of the development, use and diffusion of quality at international level through his professional activities and behaviors, personally contributing to the development of the European Quality movement through his accomplishments with a global impact in the field of quality.

== Studies ==
Anastasopoulos attended the 36th Elementary School and the 5th Gymnasium and Lyceum (high-school) in Exarheia, Athens, Greece. He received his undergraduate diploma from the Polytechnic School of University of Patras, where from he graduated with a mechanical engineering degree. Then, he moved to Chicago, Illinois, US, for graduate studies, where he attended Northwestern University, and he received his MS and PhD in applied mechanics. His research was focused on fracture mechanics specializing in understanding failure mechanisms in Brittle-Matrix Composite materials.

A major breakthrough of his research was the elasticity solution he developed for the fiber-matrix-interface stress-distribution type problem. The problem itself consists of an isolated fiber in an infinite medium (matrix). A third phase (interphase) is assumed between the fiber and the matrix (see figure 1). The matrix is uniformly loaded in tension. Both the fiber, interphase and matrix are considered to be linear elastic and isotropic. The interface between the three materials is also assumed to be perfectly bonded.

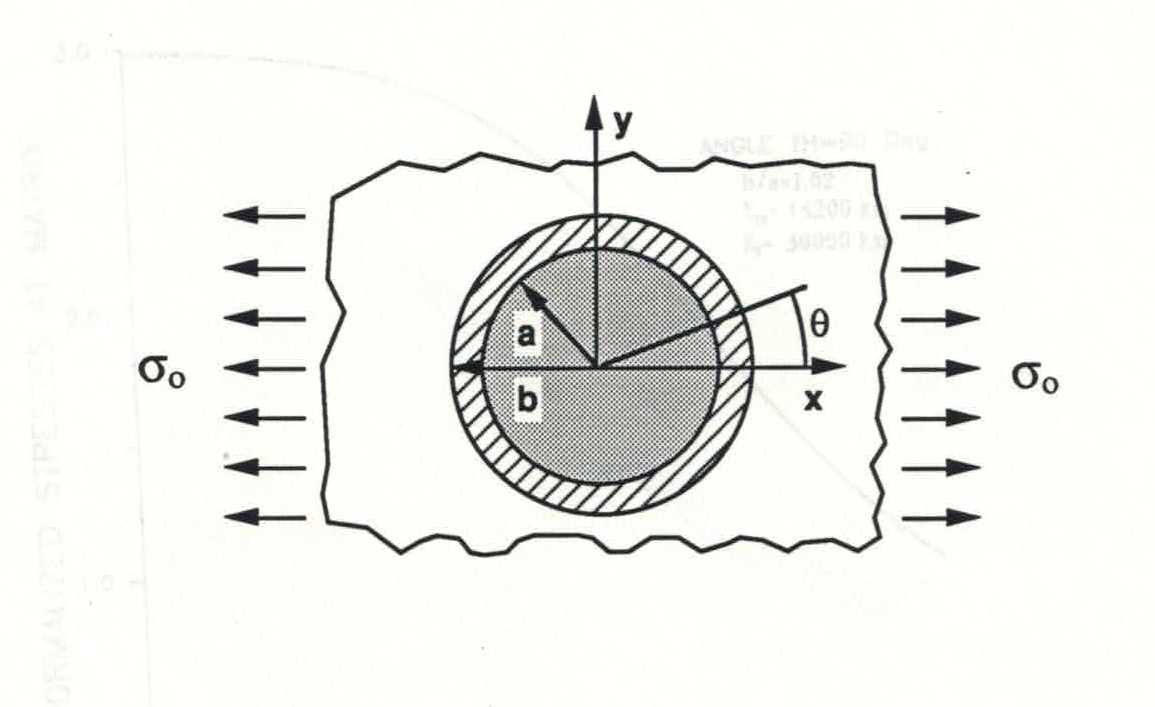
Fig. 1 Fiber-matrix-interface stress-distribution type problem

== Professional activity ==
Since 2024, Anastasopoulos is the Technical and International Business Development Manager of Perry Johnson Laboratory Accreditation, Inc. (PJLA), a third-party Accreditation Body based in Michigan, United States.

Anastasopoulos is the General Secretary of IPC, the International Personnel Certification Association. IPC was established in 1995, as a global association of Personnel Certification Bodies with the objective to represent and promote the interests of its members. Previously, he has also served as the Chairperson of IPC.

He is the Founder and Chairman, the Conformity Assessment Society (CAS), an international, non-profit US based association uniting professionals and organizations involved in testing, inspection, certification, accreditation and standardization. Founded on the principles of competence,.

From 2015 to 2024, Anastasopoulos was associated with the International Accreditation Service (IAS) in many managerial positions up to Senior Vice President.

Anastasopoulos served as General Secretary of Communications of the Ministry of Transportation and Communications (2007–2009) and as General Secretary of Industry of the Ministry of Development (2009) for the Hellenic Government under prime Minister Kostas Karamanlis.

From 2006 to 2007 he served at the Bonn-Germany based, Accreditation Panel of the United Nations Kyoto Protocol system UNFCCC/CDM. Under the Clean Development Mechanism, emission-reduction projects in developing countries can earn certified emission reduction credits. These saleable credits can be used by industrialized countries to meet a part of their emission reduction targets under the Kyoto Protocol.

As a member of International Organization for Standardization (ISO) technical committees, he has contributed in developing many international standards, including ISO 9001, ISO/IEC 17024 and ISO/IEC 17025. He also contributed to a series of technical committees such as ISO/TMBG, ASTM/E36, IPC, ISO/TC176 and ISO/CASCO. He is also participating in international organizations of Accreditation Bodies IAF and ILAC.

In addition to the above, he has also involved in the following professional activities:

- Chairman & CEO, STAREGISTER International Inc., 2012–2014
- Member of Executive Forum, Coleman Research Group, Inc., New York, USA, 2011–2014
- President and CEO, PARATUS Europe Ltd., Athens, Greece, 2011-1013
- Director International Business Development, PEOPLECERT Group, 2009–2010
- European Regional Manager, American/Australian Personnel Certification Body RAB-QSA, Athens, Greece, 2006–2007
- General Director, CHECK POINT Consulting and Training, Athens, Greece, 2002–2007
- Member of the board of directors, Hellenic Accreditation Board (ESYD), 2002–2004
- Member of the Accreditation Council, Hellenic Accreditation Board (ESYD), 2002–2004
- managing director, European Center of Advanced Technologies EUCAT SA, 1993–2004
- Member, Organizing Committee of Hellenic Ministry of Development for "Year for Quality" (1998)
- Served in a series of Technical Committees of Technical Chamber of Greece, 1996–2012

== Awards and recognitions ==
- EOQ Presidential Georges Borel Award, 2015, EU
- Metal of excellence, Mayor of Athens, Greece
- Award of Excellence by Russian Registry Certification, Russia
- Award by Hellenic Standardization Body (ELOT), Greece
- Award by Aydin University, Istanbul, Turkey
- Honor by Hellenic Professional Society of Illinois, USA (twice)
- Honor by kibbutz Hagoshrim, Israel
- Quality Council of India (QCI) Award, India
- Award from the Technical Chamber of Greece

== Publications, articles, presentation, media ==
Executive Editor (2021–2024) for "The International Journal of Conformity Assessment (IJCA)," ISSN 2770-5668, doi:10.55459/IJCA

Editor for "Recent Technologies in Sustainable Materials Engineering," Proceedings of the 3rd GeoMEast International Congress and Exhibition, Egypt 2019 on Sustainable Civil Infrastructures – The official international congress of the Soil-Structure Interaction Group in Egypt (SSIGE), published by Springer Nature Switzerland, 2020

Author of the following books:

- Leaves of Freedom, G. Anastasopoulos et al., publisher: Forum for Greece, 2006, ISBN 978-960-99846-0-7
- Auditing Processes, Volume 1: Quality Management Systems, G. Anastasopoulos, publisher: Gkiourdas Technical Publications, 2006, ISBN 960-387-497-3
- Auditing Processes, Volume 2: Auditing to ISO 19011, G. Anastasopoulos, publisher: Gkiourdas Technical Publications, 2006, ISBN 960-387-498-1
- F.W. Taylor:The First Manager, G. Anastasopoulos, publisher: CheckPoint, 2006, ISBN 960-88872-2-4
- Of Tails and Teams: A Fable for Children and CEOs, publisher: CheckPoint, 2005, ISBN 960-88872-0-8
- Quality Management Handbook, 3 volumes – 3100 pages, publisher: Dashofer, 2001, ISBN 960-87103-2-4

Other publications, articles, presentations:

- "Quality Challenges for Management System Certification Bodies – From the Accreditation Point of View," Dr. George I. Anastasopoulos, Natalya Roshka, Harry Makam, 5th ICQEM (International Conference on Quality Engineering and Management), University of Minho, Braga, Portugal, July 2022
- "Standardization and Quality Control of Ancient Athenian Coinage,", Dr. George Anastasopoulos, ANA eLearning Academy, Mar 2022
- "Quality Characteristics of Testing Laboratories Management Systems –Challenges and Opportunities for Improvement," Dr. George Anastasopoulos, Prasanth Ramakrishnan, Ioannis Anastasopoulos, Presented at 64th EOQ Quality Congress, Belgrade, Serbia, June 2021
- "The First Standard: Looking Back at the Dawn of Conformity Assessment," Dr. George Anastasopoulos, Building Safety Journal, May 2021
- "The Charonian Coin: A Toll to the Afterworld," Dr. George Anastasopoulos, ANA eLearning Academy, Jan 2021
- "Measured Approach," Ruikar, Vijay G; Brand, Leigh Andrew; Anastasopoulos, George, Quality Progress; Milwaukee Vol. 53, Iss. 9, Sep 2020: 38–43
- "Improving Performance of Testing Laboratories – A Statistical Review and Evaluation," G.I.Anastasopoulos, P.S.Ramakrishnan, I.G.Anastasopoulos, International Congress and Exhibition "Sustainable Civil Infrastructures" GeoMEast 2019: Sustainable Issues in Transportation Engineering pp 16–34, Nov 2019
- "Identification and Handling of Risks, Opportunities, and Improvements in a Laboratory," Dr. George Anastasopoulos, Helga Alexander, Prasanth Ramakrishnan, Measurement Science Conference (MSC) Symposium, Los Angeles, May 2019
- "The New ISO 17025 – What to Expect," Dr. George Anastasopoulos, Cal Lab Magazine, July 2016/36-37
- "Innovation in Broadband Internet in Greece: Myth or Reality?," keynote presentation at the 3rd International Conference on Broadband Internet, EETT, Athens, June 6–8, 2008
- "Modern Trends to Personnel Certification (in Russian)", Dr. George Anastasopoulos, 7th International Conference "Towards a New World of Quality" 7-я Международная конференция «Откройте новый мир качества», 2004/6
- "Measurement of Residual Stresses by the Hole-Drilling Strain Gage Method," Dr. George Anastasopoulos, Presented at Technical Chamber of Greece Conference, March 1995, Athens
- "Failure mechanisms and damage evolution in crossply ceramic-matrix composites," IM Daniel, G Anastassopoulos, Journal of solids and structures, 1995/2/28
- "Failure mechanisms and interfacial shear strength in brittle-matrix composites," IM Daniel, G Anastassopoulos, JW Lee, ASME-PUBLICATIONS-AD, 1993
- "The behavior of ceramic matrix fiber composites under longitudinal loading," IM Daniel, G Anastassopoulos, J-W Lee, Composites science and technology, 1993/12/31
- "Investigation of Interphase Stiffness in Ceramic Matrix Composites", GJ Anastassopoulos, IM Daniel, Proc. of Third International Symposium, Advanced Composites in Emerging Technologies, Patras, Greece, 1990/8
- "Experimental micromechanics of brittle-matrix composites", IM Daniel, G Anastassopoulos, JW Lee, Micromechanics: Experimental Techniques, AMD, 1989/12
- “Failure mechanisms in ceramic-matrix composites”, IM Daniel, G Anastassopoulos, JW Lee, Proc. of SEM Spring Conf. on Experimental Mechanics, 1989/5/29
- “Failure mechanisms in ceramic-matrix composites”, IM Daniel, G Anastassopoulos, JW Lee, WRDC/Air Force/NASA/ Naval Research/US Army Conference, 1989/Oct-31 to Nov 1
