= University of Patras =

Public university in Patras, Greece

Coordinates: 38°17′12″N 21°47′11″E

- Πανεπιστήμιο Πατρών
- Type: Public higher education institution
- Established: 11 November 1964; 61 years ago
- Rector: Christos J. Bouras
- Academic staff: 715
- Administrative staff: 429
- Students: 33.832
- Undergraduates: 29.901
- Postgraduates: 3.931 Postgraduate students
- Location: Patras, Greece
- Campus: Rio campus, 7 kilometres east of the city centre of Patras
- Website: www.upatras.gr/en

The University of Patras (UPatras; Greek: Πανεπιστήμιο Πατρών, Panepistímio Patrón, abbr. ΠΠ) is a public university in Patras, Greece. It is the third-largest university in Greece with respect to the size of the student body, the staff, and the number of departments.

The University of Patras is considered one of the top-ranked universities in Greece and has been placed in the top 200 universities in subject areas.

In 2019, the student population was more than 33,000 (29,901 at the undergraduate level and 3,931 at the postgraduate level). It has 715 faculty members, 234 scientific staff members and 429 administrative personnel and comprises seven schools and thirty-one departments.

== History ==
The University of Patras was established on 11 November 1964 as a self-administered academic institution under the supervision of the Greek government. It was housed in the city centre of Patras, Greece, and later in a campus area of about 600 acres selected in 1968 and appropriated on behalf of the university, located in the adjacent municipality of Rio. Covering an area of 4.5 km^{2}, it is one of the largest in the country.

In June 2013 the University of Western Greece was incorporated in the University of Patras. In 2019 the Technological Educational Institute of Western Greece was incorporated in the University of Patras. After the merger of the university with the Technological Educational Institute of Western Greece, there are two main campuses (two in Patras) and smaller campuses/facilities in Messolonghi and Agrinio. The campus in Patras is located in the suburb of Rion and Koukouli.

Besides education, the University of Patras is involved in research in areas such as environment, health, biotechnology, mechanics, electronics, informatics and basic science. A number of the university's departments, laboratories and clinics have been designated as centres of excellence, on the basis of international assessment.

== Emblem ==
The emblem of the university is Andrew the Apostle. The university's opening took place on 30 November 1966, which is the date that the city of Patras celebrates its patron Saint Andrew. This is the reason that the emblem of the university is an X cross, which symbolises the one on which St. Andrew was crucified. In 2012, the emblem was renewed but it remained true to the prototype.

== Academic profile ==
The university consists of seven schools, thirty one departments with undergraduate study programs leading to a degree.

Furthermore, the University of Patras offers postgraduate programs, as well as digital and open courses.

Schools	Departments
School of Agricultural Sciences Founded in 2019.	Department of Fisheries & Aquaculture (2019, Messolonghi); Department of Food Science & Technology (2019, Agrinio); Department of Agriculture (2019, Messolonghi); Department of Sustainable Agriculture (2022, Agrinio)
School of Economics and Business Founded as School of Business Administration in 2013. Renamed to School of Economics and Business in 2019.	Department of Business Administration (1999); Department of Economics (1985); Department of Management Science and Technology (2019); Department of Tourism Management (2019)
School of Engineering (Polytechneio) Founded in 1967, it includes a Department of Engineering Sciences (1983).	Department of Architecture (1999); Department of Chemical Engineering (1977); Department of Civil Engineering (1972); Department of Computer Engineering and Informatics (CEID) (1980); Department of Electrical Engineering and Computer Technology (renamed from Dept. of Electrical Engineering, 1967); Department of Mechanical Engineering and Aeronautics (1972, renamed from Dept. of Mechanical Engineering)
School of Health Rehabilitation Sciences Founded in 2019.	Department of Nursing (2019); Department of Physiotherapy (2019); Department of Speech & Language Therapy (2019)
School of Health Sciences Founded as the Medicine School in 1977. Renamed to School of Health Sciences in 1983.	Department of Medicine (1983) (initially as Medicine School in 1977); Department of Pharmacy (1983) (initially in the School of Mathematics and Physics in 1977)
School of Humanities and Social Sciences Founded in 1989.	Department of Educational Sciences and Early Childhood Education (1983); Department of Education and Social Work (1983, renamed from Dpt. of Primary Education); Department of History and Archaeology (2019); Department of Philology (1994); Department of Philosophy (1999); Department of Theatre Studies (1989)
School of Natural Sciences Founded as the School of Mathematics and Physics on 19 October 1966. Renamed to the School of Natural Sciences in 1983.	Department of Biology (1966); Department of Chemistry (1966); Department of Geology (1977); Department of Materials Science (1999); Department of Mathematics (1966); Department of Physics (1966)

== Research ==
In its 180 laboratories, research is conducted by students and teaching staff members.

Apart from regular teaching and research activities, the laboratories are the focal points for the creation of national and international research consortia. The university participates in all major European research programmes.

The management of research projects is carried out by the Research Committee and its administration unit. The financial management of research projects with external funding produces resources for the university, which are used for specific educational and developmental activities, as well as funding of researchers. In recent years, over 2700 research projects, financed both by the state and the European Union have been carried out.

The University of Patras collaborated with the Libre Space Foundation to launch UPSat in 2017, the first satellite manufactured in Greece and the first satellite in history made entirely with open-source software and open-source hardware. It was a cubesat launched from the International Space Station that participated in the QB50 mission to study Earth's thermosphere.

== Academic evaluation ==
University rankings

Global – Overall
- ARWU World: 701–800 (2023)
- QS World: 721-730 (2026)
- THE World: 801–1000 (2024)
- USNWR Global: =860 (2023)

An external evaluation of all academic departments in Greek universities was conducted by the Hellenic Quality Assurance and Accreditation Agency (HQA).

In 2015 the external evaluation committee gave University of Patras a Positive evaluation.

== Location and campus ==
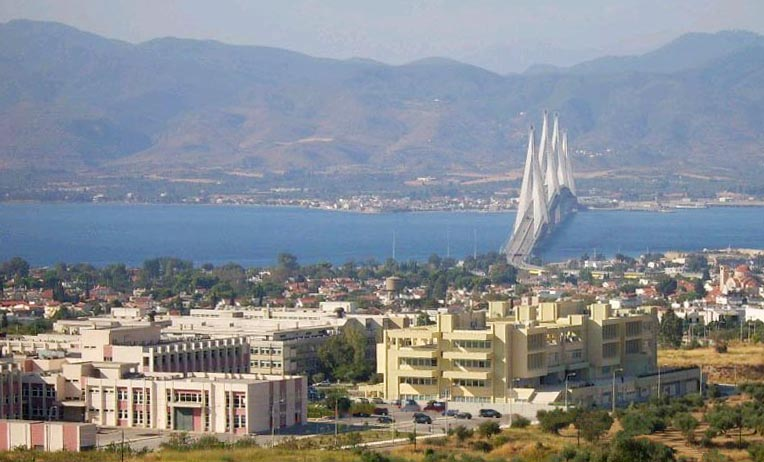
University of Patras with Rio–Antirrio bridge in the background

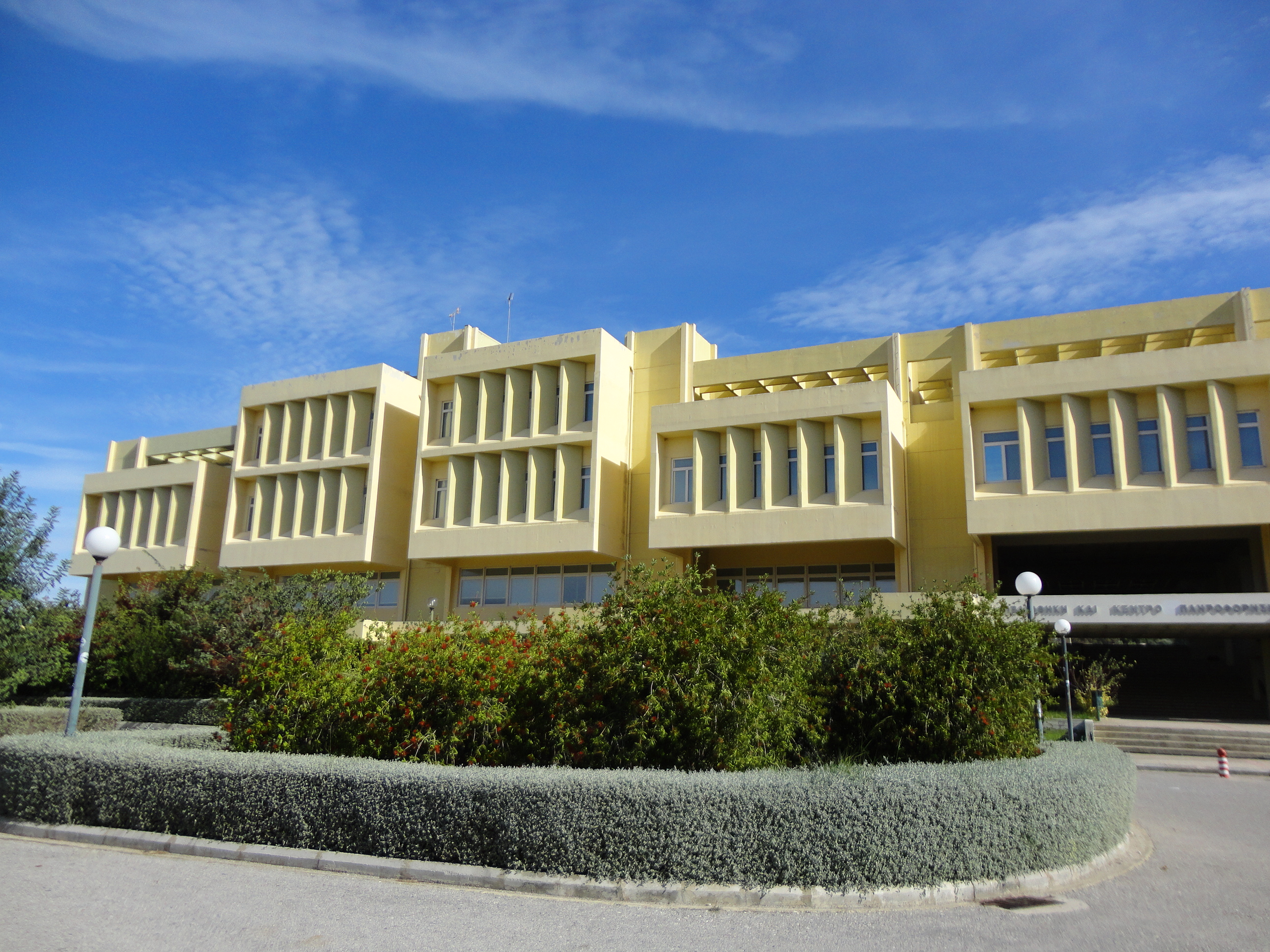
Front view of the Central Library of the university

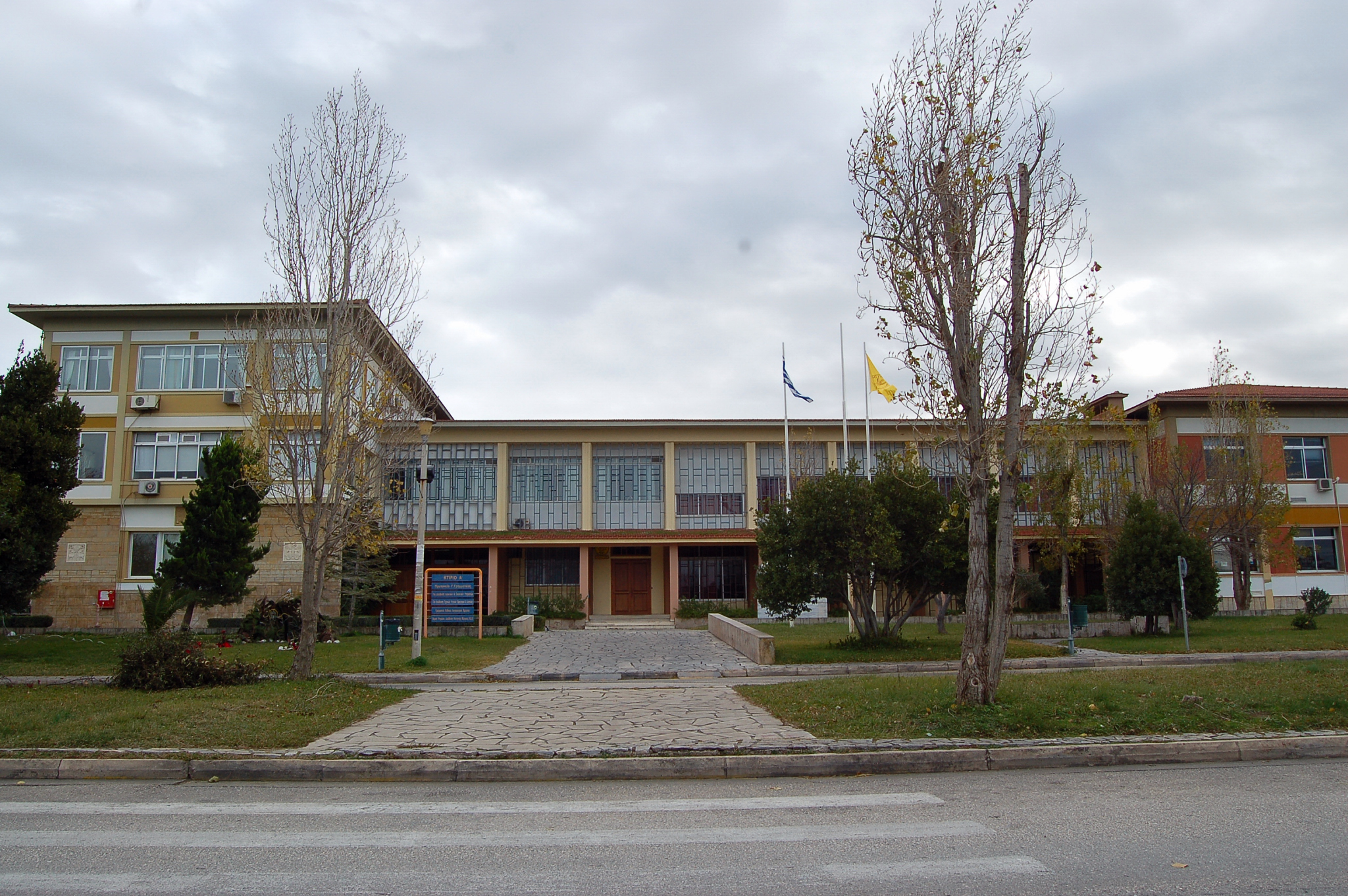
University of Patras, Administration Building A

The campuses of Patras are situated in the suburb Rion which is 7 km north east of the City of Patras within the Municipality of Patras, and at Koukouli, Patras. Departments of the University of Patras are located in the cities of Messolonghi and Agrinio.

The campus of Rion is located next to the University Regional General Hospital of Patras. It is a self-contained campus.

The university's campus in Rion has four entrances. The track and field and sporting grounds are in the southern part.

The first buildings of the university campus of Rion were a unit of 20 small ground level pre-fabricated buildings, still housing some academic and administrative offices. In 1972 the construction of buildings "A" and "B" started. Building "A" houses the administrative services, the rectorship, the Senate's Conference Hall, the university's Ceremonial Hall, a teaching amphitheatre and seminar halls.

Following the master plan, 25 buildings were eventually built, along with a new library, and many more are under construction for the housing of most of the departments, a museum of science and technology, a botanical garden, and a new student centre. Within the campus there are also found the Students' Residence Hall, the Conference and Cultural Centre, a restaurant, a bank, a bookstore, the university's publishing house, cafeterias and kiosks. The University Conference Centre is the only building of the university outside the campus. It is located three kilometres west of the campus. The campus has not been completed yet.

Within the campus of Rion there is also the Regional University Teaching Hospital which functions both as the major regional medical centre and as a teaching facility for the Faculty of Medicine.

Concurrently there is a continuous effort to upgrade and improve the landscape within the campus, although extensive infrastructure projects, landscaping and athletic facilities have been completed. Several other facilities are available on campus including a gymnasium, a post-office, a swimming pool, a nursery school, a primary and secondary school for the children of the academic faculty and administrative personnel.

In addition to constructing new buildings, new sites at the surroundings have been appropriated on behalf of the university. The campus of Rion has many open-spaces, green shady areas covered with characteristically Mediterranean olive groves.

== Gallery ==
Department of Pharmacy, view of the entrance and the main building

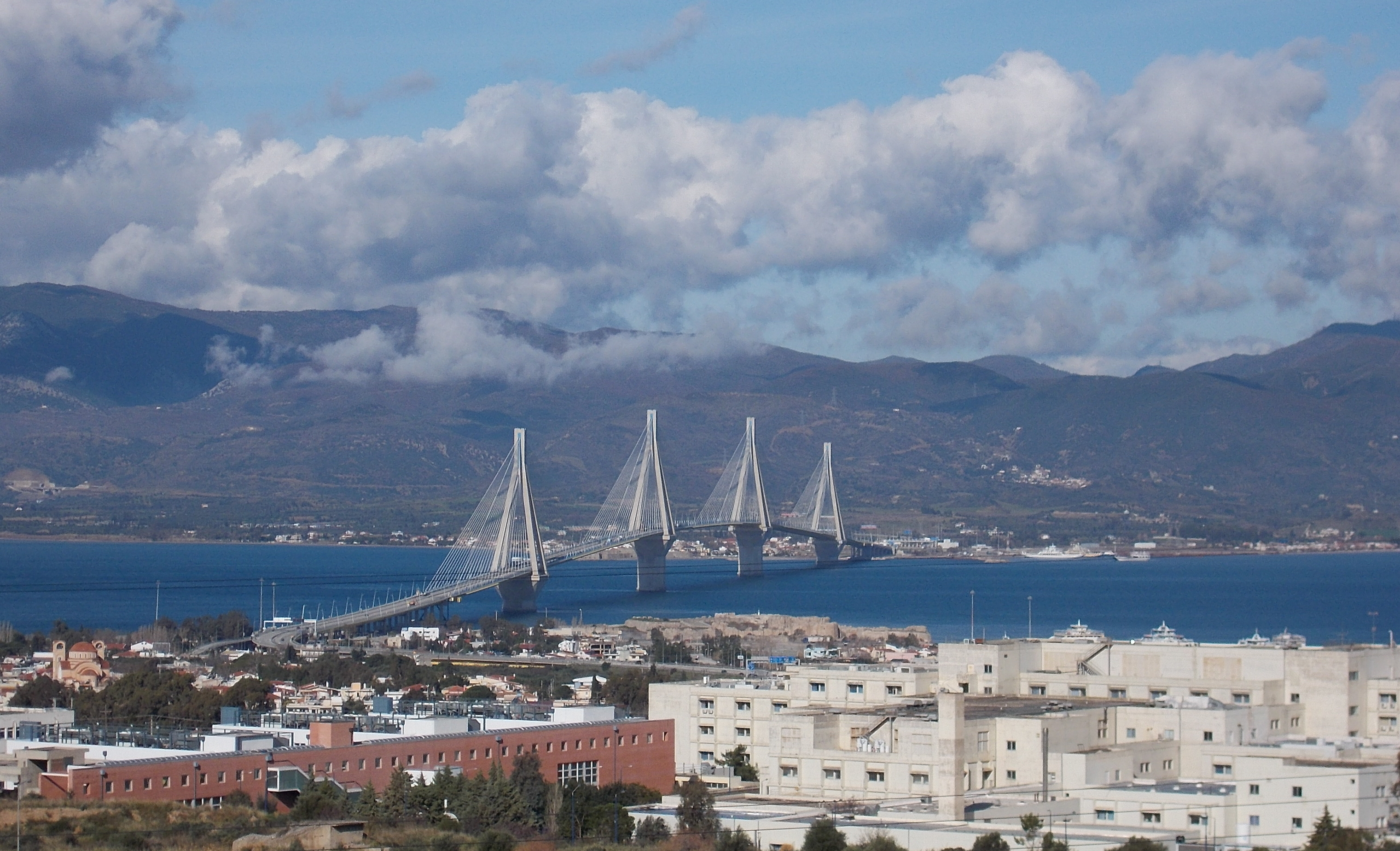
View of the university hospital and the new buildings of the department of medicine

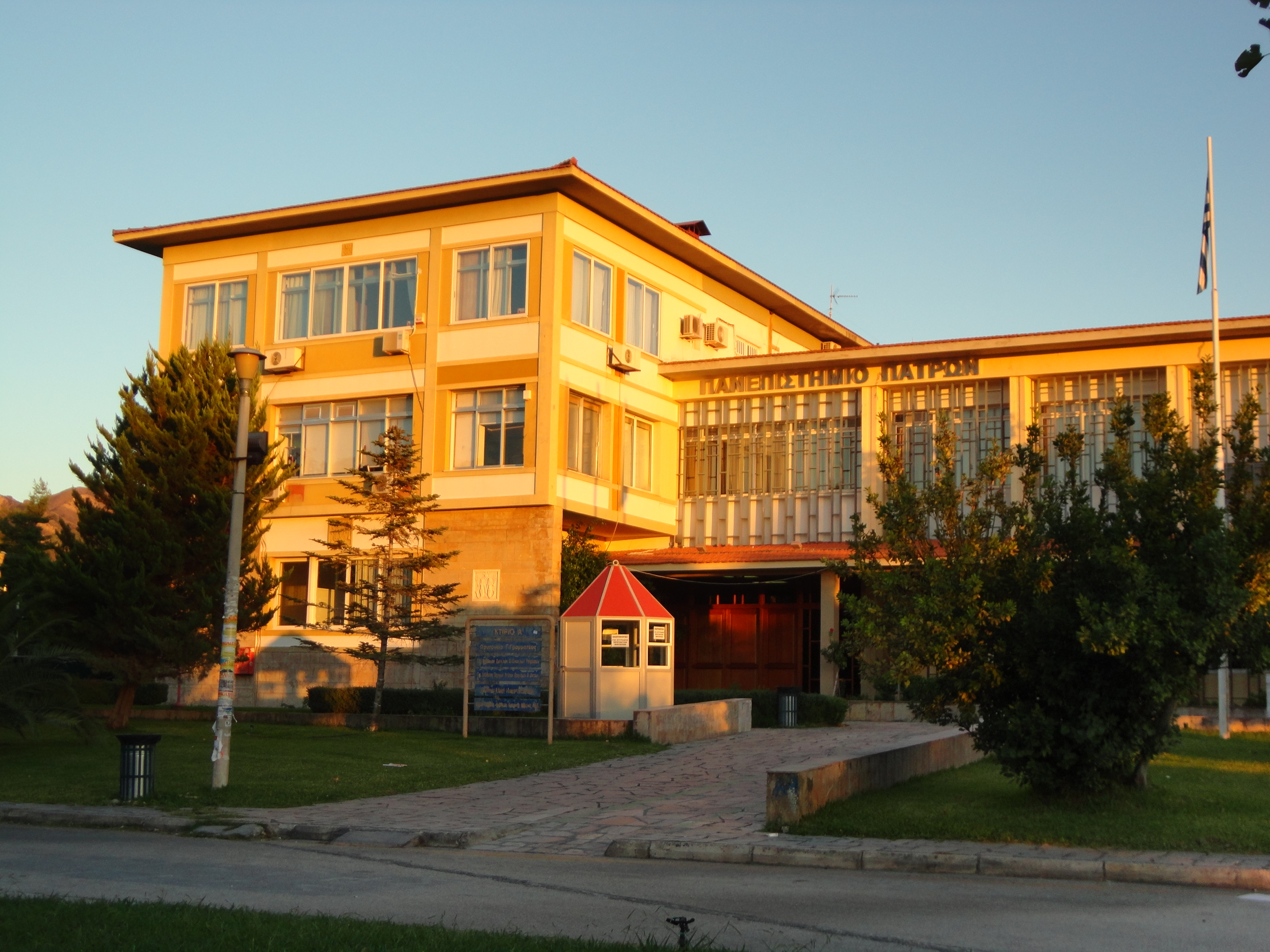
Administration building A (Rector's office inside)

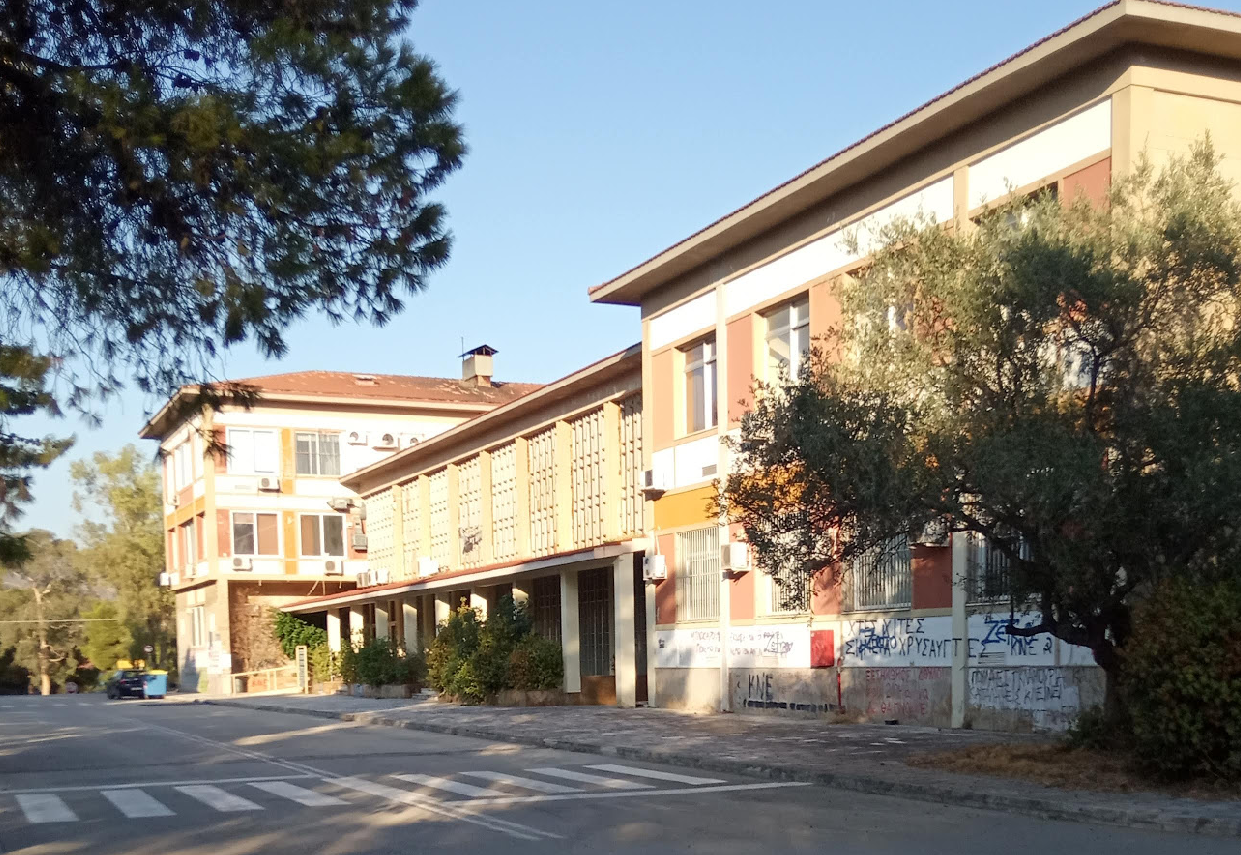
Building B (ex. Computer Engineering department)

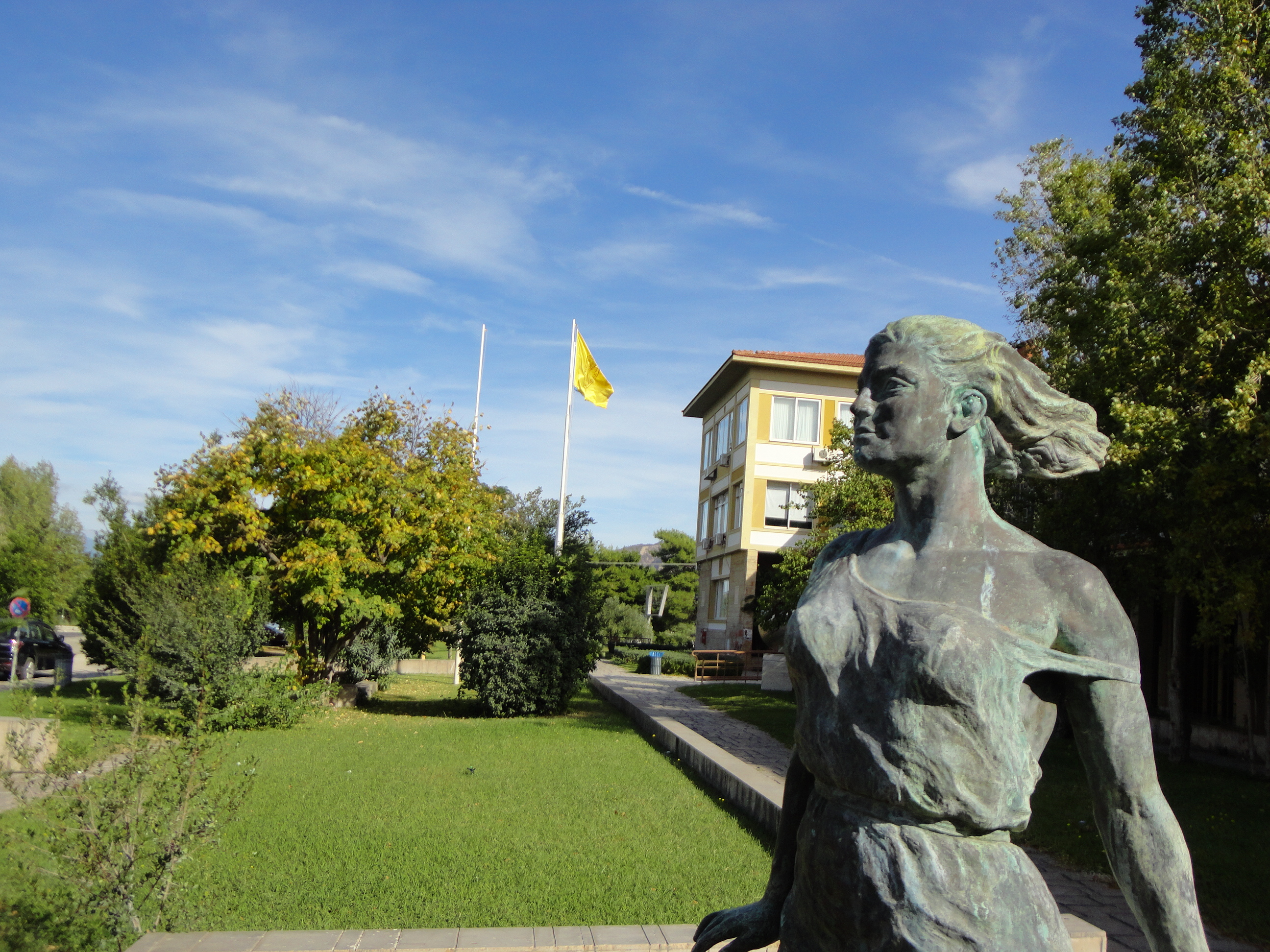

== Notable people ==
- George Anastasopoulos, Engineer, awarded in 2015 with the EOQ Presidential Georges Borel Award for contributing to the development of the European Quality movement through his accomplishments with a global impact in the field of quality. (Mechanical Engineering)
- Nikolaos Bourbakis, computer scientist known for his work in image processing. (Electrical and Computer Engineering)
- John Lambris, Ralph and Sallie Weaver Professor of Research Medicine at the University of Pennsylvania
- Christos Laskaris, Greek poet awarded with the Cavafy International Award in Cairo in 2007. (Pedagogy)
- Ioannis Liritzis, professor of physics in archaeology (archaeometry) at the University of Henan and the application of natural sciences to archaeology and cultural heritage, awarded with the Prize of Academy of Athens. (Physics)
- Stathis Psillos, Greek philosopher of science classified among the 91 most cited living philosophers, (Physics)
- Radovan Stojanovic, Montenegrin professor of electrical and computing engineering, known for his work in accelerating science and technology in the Western Balkan and the Mediterranean,

== See also ==
- List of universities in Greece
- Academic grading in Greece
- Bologna Process
- Education in Greece
- Open access in Greece
- University of Patras Formula Student Team – UoP Racing Team
- Patras Science Park
- University of Patras Poetry Symposium
