= Patras Science Park =

Science park located in Patras, Greece

The Patras Science Park is a science park located in Patras, Greece near the University of Patras and the University Hospital of Rio. The site is the home for many high technology companies in Western Greece.

== Companies ==
The following companies and institutes are current or former residents of the Science Park:

- Atmel, A San Jose, California-based Semiconductor company
- Analogies SA, a high speed wired and wireless connectivity Semiconductor intellectual property core company
- ByteMobile, acquired by Citrix Systems
- Nanoradio, a Swedish fabless wireless connectivity semiconductor company, acquired by Samsung
- Think Silicon, an embedded GPU company
- Velti, a mobile marketing and advertising company
