= John Lambris =

Greek-American biochemist

John D. Lambris
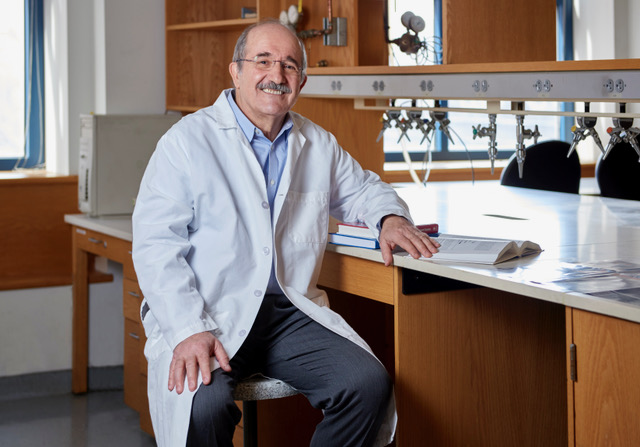
- Born: Greece

Academic background
- Education: B.S., Biology; Ph.D., Biochemistry
- Alma mater: University of Patras

Academic work
- Institutions: University of Pennsylvania
- Website: www.lambris.com

John D. Lambris is a Greek-American biochemist and an academic. He is a professor in the Department of Pathology and Laboratory Medicine as well as Dr. Ralph and Sallie Weaver Professor of Research Medicine at the University of Pennsylvania.

Lambris' research encompasses complement structure, function, evolution and biology, with a focus on identifying roles of complement in immunity and disease. He has contributed to complement drug discovery by developing therapies that target unwanted complement activation in diseases. His lab has discovered a new class of peptide-based drugs, termed compstatins, and findings in the therapeutic modulation of complement, which validated C3 as a therapeutic target and supported the clinical approval of the first compstatin-based C3 inhibitors for various conditions. He has been included in the list of highly cited researchers identified by Clarivate/ISI. His works have been published in academic journals, including Nature Immunology and Nature Medicine. He has also edited publications, including books such as Structural Biology of the Complement System and Current Topics in Complement II.

== Education ==
Lambris completed his Bachelor of Science in Biology from the University of Patras in 1976. Later in 1979, he obtained a Ph.D. in Biochemistry from the same institution.

== Career ==
In 1981, Lambris served as a research associate in the Department of Medicine at the University of North Carolina. From 1981 to 1982, he was a research assistant professor in the same department. From 1983 to 1986, he held the position of assistant member in the Department of Immunology at the Research Institute of Scripps Clinic. Between 1986 and 1990, he served as director of the Protein Chemistry Laboratory and as a member of the Basel Institute for Immunology. From 1990 to 2005, he was director of the Protein Chemistry Laboratory at the University of Pennsylvania while serving as an associate professor in the Department of Pathology and Laboratory Medicine from 1990 to 1994.

In 2013, he founded Amyndas Pharmaceuticals, a clinical-stage pharmaceutical company developing complement inhibitors. Since 1994, he has been a professor in the Department of Pathology and Laboratory Medicine at the University of Pennsylvania, and since 2007, he has held the title of Dr. Ralph and Sallie Weaver Professor of Research Medicine there. He is also the executive director and founder of Aegean Conferences. Additionally, he was the first elected president of the International Complement Society.

Lambris holds patents on complement inhibitors for therapeutic applications. His inventions include the first C3-targeted cyclic peptide inhibitor. This class comprises third and fourth generation compstatin derivatives with enhanced pharmacokinetic profiles and pharmacologic activities (including compounds like AMY-101 and AMY-106).

== Research ==
Lambris' research has focused on drug discovery and complement biology. Using complement as a model system, his group applied concepts to study the evolutionary history, structure, and functions of the complement system in both disease and health. His research group was among the first in exploring the roles of the third complement component (C3), providing insights into its activation and regulatory mechanisms. They identified key interactions between C3 and various natural ligands, viral immune evasion proteins, regulatory molecules and complement receptors. His approach led to the development of complement-targeted immunotherapies focused on C3. This included the discovery of Compstatin, the first small-molecule inhibitor of C3, and the subsequent refinement of this inhibitor family through structure-based design. These efforts resulted in the creation of therapies, such as Empaveli and Syfovre, used to treat paroxysmal nocturnal hemoglobinuria (PNH), and geographic atrophy. Additionally, his 1988 publication, co-authored with Y. Frei and B. Stockinger, detailed the creation of the first monoclonal antibody targeting C5.

Lambris' lab has also made contributions to innate immunology by questioning established paradigms and researching the role of the complement system in tissue homeostasis, innate immunity, and inflammation. The lab's research has identified functions of complement-modulated pathways in tissue regeneration and revealed tumor-promoting activities of complement, which present potential therapeutic targets for enhancing cancer immunotherapy. The lab has uncovered complement-mediated networks that influence synaptic plasticity during brain development and drive neuroinflammatory responses linked to cognitive decline in neurodegenerative diseases.

In collaboration with George Hajishengallis and other researchers, Lambris' lab also demonstrated the role of complement in driving dysbiosis of the oral microbiota, leading to periodontal inflammation and bone loss. These findings supported the development of C3 inhibition as a promising host-targeted therapy for periodontal disease, culminating in the Phase II trial of the compstatin-based inhibitor AMY-101 for treating periodontal inflammation.

Through a partnership with the Department of Medicine at Democritus University of Thrace, Lambris' lab was the first to demonstrate that complement activation induces thrombogenic responses in neutrophils, promoting tissue factor expression and the release of neutrophil extracellular traps (NETs). This work was extended to studies on severe COVID-19, where the lab and its collaborators showed that C3 activation amplifies interactions between platelets and neutrophils, driving TF-enriched NET release and immunothrombosis associated with the disease. These findings led to Phase II trial of the C3 inhibitor AMY-101 in severe COVID-19 patients.

Additionally, Lambris has advanced the understanding of the evolutionary biology of the complement system by discovering multiple isoforms of complement proteins in teleost fish. These findings highlight how these species compensate for their relatively limited adaptive immune systems by enhancing the capabilities of their innate immune recognition.

== Awards and honors ==
- 1991 – M.S. (Honorary), University of Pennsylvania
- 2006 – Honorary Doctorate, Linnaeus University
- 2013 – Honorary Doctorate, Uppsala University
- 2012 – Hans Kupczyk Guest Professor, University of Ulm, Germany
- 2015 – Class of Sciences Awards, Academy of Athens
- 2023 – Honorary professor, Democritus University of Thrace

== Bibliography ==
=== Books ===
- The Third Component of Complement - Chemistry and Biology (1990) ISBN 978-3-642-74979-7
- Therapeutic Interventions in the Complement System (2000) ISBN 978-0-89603-587-4
- Structural Biology of the Complement System (2005) ISBN 978-0-367-45417-3
- Structural Biology of the Complement System (2005) ISBN 978-0-429-11429-8
- Current Topics in Complement (2006) ISBN 978-0-387-32231-5
- Current Topics in Innate Immunity (2007) ISBN 978-0-387-71765-4
- Current Topics in Complement II (2008) ISBN 978038778951
- Inflammation and Retinal Disease: Complement Biology and Pathology (2010) ISBN 978-1-4419-5634-7
- Complement Therapeutics (2013) ISBN 978-1-4614-4117-5

=== Selected articles ===
- Mastellos DC, Hajishengallis G, Lambris JD. (2023). A guide to complement biology, pathology and therapeutic opportunity. Nat Rev Immunol.: 24:118-141.
- Lamers C, Mastellos DC, Ricklin D, Lambris JD. (2022). Compstatins: the dawn of clinical C3-targeted complement inhibition. Trends in Pharmacological Sciences 43: 629-640.
- Skendros P, Germanidis G, Mastellos DC, Antoniadou C, Gavriilidis E, Kalopitas G, Samakidou A, Liontos A, Chrysanthopoulou A, Ntinopoulou M, Kogias D, Karanika I, Smyrlis A, Cepaityte D, Fotiadou I, Zioga N, Mitroulis I, Gatselis NK, Papagoras C, Metallidis S, Milionis H, Dalekos GN, Willems L, Persson B, Manivel VA, Nilsson B, Connolly ES, Iacobelli S, Papadopoulos V, Calado RT, Huber-Lang M, Risitano AM, Yancopoulou D, Ritis K, Lambris JD. (2022). Complement C3 inhibition in severe COVID-19 using compstatin AMY-101. Sci Adv. 8: eabo2341.
- Ricklin, D., Hajishengallis, G., Yang, K., & Lambris, J. D. (2010). Complement: a key system for immune surveillance and homeostasis. Nature immunology, 11(9), 785-797.
- Markiewski MM, DeAngelis RA, Benencia F, Ricklin-Lichtsteiner SK, Koutoulaki A, Gerard C, Coukos G, Lambris JD. (2008). Modulation of the anti-tumor immune response by complement. Nature Immunology 9(11): 1225-1235.
- Sunyer JO, Zarkadis IK, Sahu A, Lambris JD. (1996). Multiple forms of complement C3 in trout that differ in binding to complement activators. Proceedings of the National Academy of Sciences of the United States of America 93: 8546-51.
