= Nikolaos Bourbakis =

Greek computer scientist

- Born: Nikolaos G. Bourbakis; December 10, 1950 (age 75); Chania, Crete, Greece
- Education: National and Kapodistrian University of Athens; University of Patras
- Occupations: Computer scientist, professor

Nikolaos G. Bourbakis (Νικόλαος Μπουρμπάκης; born 1950 in Chania, Crete) is a Greek computer scientist known for his work in image processing. As of 2011, he is Ohio Board of Regents Distinguished Professor of Information Technology and director of both the Information Technology Research Institute and the Assistive Technologies Research Center at Wright State University in Ohio, United States. He is the founder and editor-in-chief (as of 2011) of the International Journal on Artificial Intelligence Tools.

Bourbakis studied mathematics at the National and Kapodistrian University of Athens, then electrical engineering at the University of Patras, which awarded him a PhD in computer engineering and informatics in 1983.

Bourbakis received the IEEE Computer Society Technical Achievement Award in 1998 "[f]or outstanding and pioneering contributions to space filling curves for image processing and intelligent visual navigation of autonomous robots in unknown space."
