= Ground station =

Terrestrial radio station for communication with spacecraft

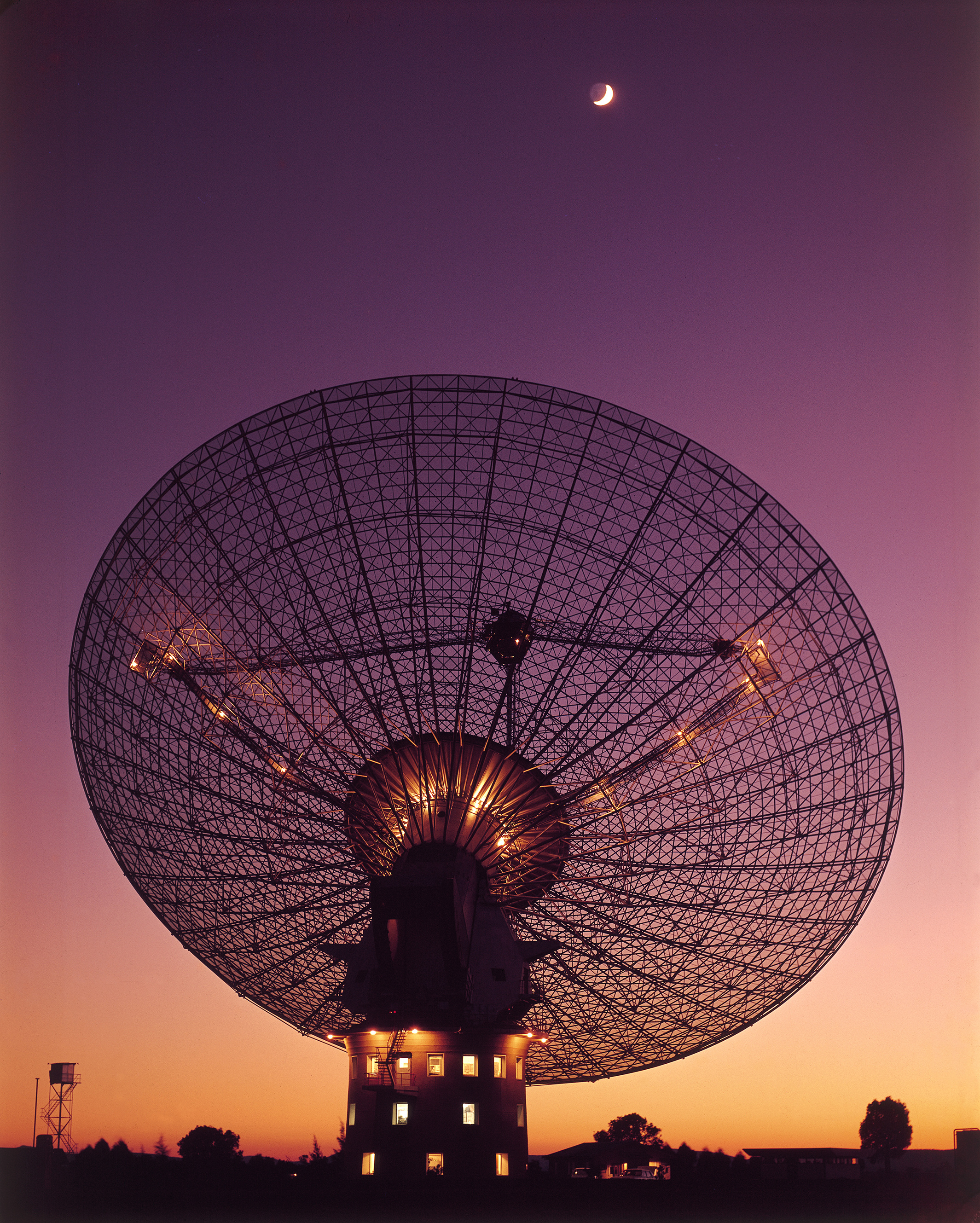
Parkes Observatory pointing toward the Moon, receiving data from Apollo 11 mission back to Earth

A ground station, Earth station, or Earth terminal is a terrestrial radio station designed for extraplanetary telecommunication with spacecraft (constituting part of the ground segment of the spacecraft system), or reception of radio waves from astronomical radio sources. Ground stations may be located either on the surface of the Earth, or in its atmosphere. Earth stations communicate with spacecraft by transmitting and receiving radio waves in the super high frequency (SHF) or extremely high frequency (EHF) bands (e.g. microwaves), or in the optical bands for laser communication (then called Optical Ground Station, OGS). When a ground station successfully transmits radio waves to a spacecraft (or vice versa), it establishes a telecommunications link. A principal telecommunications device of the ground station is the parabolic antenna.

Ground stations may have either a fixed or itinerant position. Article 1 § III of the International Telecommunication Union (ITU) Radio Regulations describes various types of stationary and mobile ground stations, and their interrelationships.

Specialized satellite Earth stations or satellite tracking stations are used to telecommunicate with satellites — chiefly communications satellites. Other ground stations communicate with crewed space stations or uncrewed space probes. A ground station that primarily receives telemetry data, or that follows space missions, or satellites not in geostationary orbit, is called a ground tracking station, or space tracking station, or simply a tracking station.

When a spacecraft or satellite is within a ground station's line of sight, the station is said to have a view of the spacecraft (see pass). A spacecraft can communicate with more than one ground station at a time. A pair of ground stations are said to have a spacecraft in mutual view when the stations share simultaneous, unobstructed, line-of-sight contact with the spacecraft.

== Telecommunications port ==
A telecommunications port — or, more commonly, teleport — is a satellite ground station that functions as a hub connecting a satellite or geocentric orbital network with a terrestrial telecommunications network, such as the Internet.

Teleports may provide various broadcasting services among other telecommunications functions, such as uploading computer programs or issuing commands over an uplink to a satellite.

In May 1984, the Dallas/Fort Worth Teleport became the first American teleport to commence operation.

== Earth terminal complexes ==
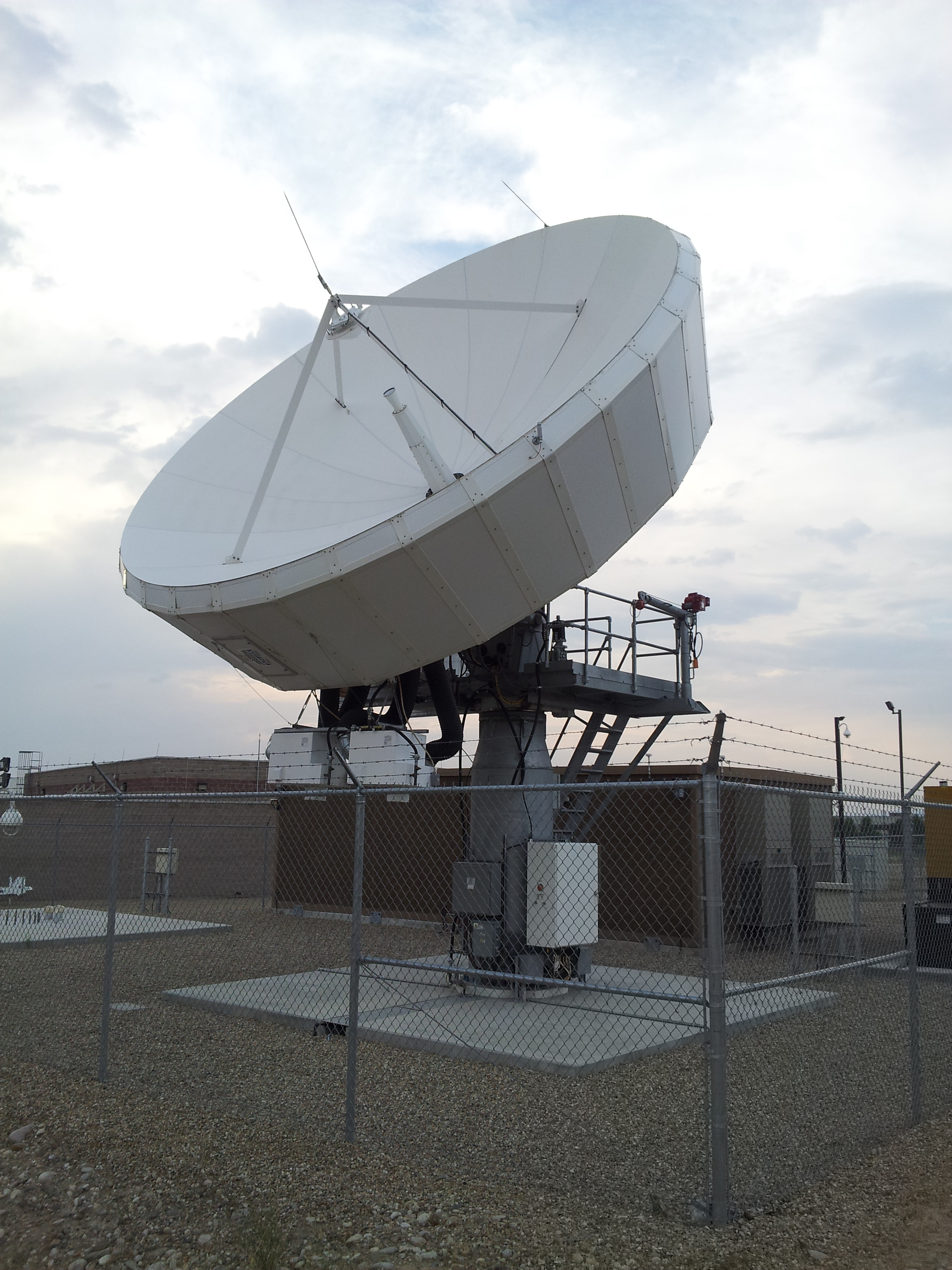
A Tier-1 satellite dish (manufactured by Level 3 Communications) in Boise, Idaho

In Federal Standard 1037C, the United States General Services Administration defined an Earth terminal complex as the assemblage of equipment and facilities necessary to integrate an Earth terminal (ground station) into a telecommunications network. FS-1037C has since been subsumed by the ATIS Telecom Glossary, which is maintained by the Alliance for Telecommunications Industry Solutions (ATIS), an international, business-oriented, non-governmental organization. The Telecommunications Industry Association also acknowledges this definition.

== Satellite communications standards ==
The ITU Radiocommunication Sector (ITU-R), a division of the International Telecommunication Union, codifies international standards agreed-upon through multinational discourse. From 1927 to 1932, the International Consultative Committee for Radio administered standards and regulations now governed by the ITU-R.

In addition to the body of standards defined by the ITU-R, each major satellite operator provides technical requirements and standards that ground stations must meet in order to communicate with the operator's satellites. For example, Intelsat publishes the Intelsat Earth Station Standards (IESS) which, among other things, classifies ground stations by the capabilities of their parabolic antennas, and pre-approves certain antenna models. Eutelsat publishes similar standards and requirements, such as the Eutelsat Earth Station Standards (EESS). The Interagency Operations Advisory Group offers a Service Catalog describing standard services, Spacecraft Emergency Cross Support Standard, and Consultative Committee for Space Data Systems data standards.

The Teleport (originally called a Telecommunications Satellite Park) innovation was conceived and developed by Joseph Milano in 1976 as part of a National Research Council study entitled, Telecommunications for Metropolitan Areas: Near-Term Needs and Opportunities.

== Networks ==
A network of ground stations is a group of stations located to support spacecraft communication, tracking, or both. A network is established to provide dedicated support to a specific mission, function, program or organization.

Ground station networks include:

- United States Space Force Satellite Control Network (SCN)
- NASA Near Space Network
- NASA Deep Space Network
- Russia tracking network
- European Space Tracking (ESTRACK) network
- ISRO Telemetry, Tracking and Command Network (ISTRAC)
- JAXA Near-Earth Tracking and Control Network
- China Satellite Launch and Tracking Control (CLTC)
- Norway Kongsberg Satellite Services (KSAT)
- Swedish Space Corporation (SSC) CONNECT ground station network
- RBC Signals Global Ground Station Network
- Leaf Space ground station network
- Amazon Web Services Ground Station network
- SatNOGS Network

Other historical networks have included:

- Smithsonian Astrophysical Observatory (SAO) Optical Tracking Network
- US Minitrack
- Applied Physics Laboratory Transit Network (Tranet)
- Interkosmos network

== Major Earth stations and Earth terminal complexes ==
- Bukit Timah Satellite Earth Station, Singapore
- Canberra Deep Space Communication Complex, Australia
- Esrange Space Center, Sweden
- Fucino Space Centre, Italy
- Goldstone Deep Space Communications Complex, California, U.S.
- Goonhilly Satellite Earth Station, UK
- Honeysuckle Creek Tracking Station (closed), Australia
- Jamesburg Earth Station (abandoned), California, U.S.
- Kaena Point Satellite Tracking Station, Hawaii, U.S.
- Madley Communications Centre, UK
- Madrid Deep Space Communication Complex, Spain
- Makarios Earth Station, Cyprus
- Malargüe Station, Argentina
- New Norcia Station, Australia
- SUPARCO Satellite Ground Station, Pakistan
- Svalbard Satellite Station, Norway

== See also ==
- Antenna farm
- Fundamental station
- Geosynchronous orbit
- Ground segment
- List of astronomical observatories
- Mission control center
- Observatory
- Pass (spaceflight), the period in which a spacecraft is above the local horizon
- Radio astronomy
- Radio telescope
- Satellite geodesy#Satellite tracking
- Satellite truck
- SatNOGS
- Test loop translator
