= Test loop translator =

Type of radio frequency converter

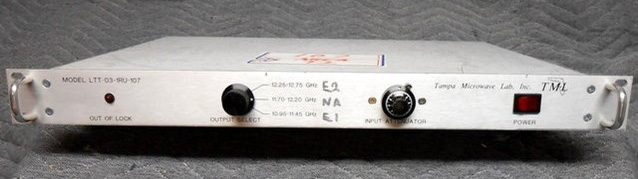
Tampa Microwave Lab LTT-03-1RU-107 Test Loop Translator with adjustable output frequency and attenuation

A test loop translator (TLT) is a type of radio frequency converter or heterodyne, used to translate between uplink and downlink segments (generally in the same band), to allow for "loop-back" testing and calibration of a satellite ground station without the need to interface with the satellite. The test loop translator is an extremely valuable tool for evaluating the performance of satellite earth stations. It allows the user to carry out analysis, alignment and system testing without incurring satellite airtime costs and the risk of interfering with other satellite users. Thus, it has applications during equipment development, qualification, troubleshooting and in-service routine monitoring. TLTs generally contain a fixed or preset local oscillator (LO) and a preset gain, though the LO and gain may be adjustable in some models. Most models have a negative gain (i.e., signal attenuation), with -15 dB being the most common value. Test loop translators can cover one or more of the satellite communication bands S, C, X, K_{u}, DBS, and K_{a}.
