= Hackaday =

Hardware hacking website

- Website type: Weblog
- Available in: English
- Owner: Supplyframe Inc.
- Founder: Phillip Torrone
- Editor: Elliot Williams
- Website: hackaday.com
- Commercial: Yes
- Registration: Optional
- Launched: September 2004
- Current status: Online

Hackaday is a hardware hacking website. It was founded in 2004 as a web magazine. Since 2014, Hackaday also hosts a community database of open-source hardware designs.

== History ==
Hackaday was founded in 2004 by Phillip Torrone as a web magazine for Engadget, devoted to publishing and archiving "the best hacks, mods and DIY projects from around web". Hackaday was since split from Engadget and its former parent company Weblogs, Inc. by its at the time owner Jason Calacanis. In 2007 Computerworld magazine ranked Hackaday #10 on their list of the top 15 geek blog sites.

Hackaday.io started as a project hosting site in 2014 under the name of Hackaday Projects. It allows users to upload open-source hardware designs. As of 2015, it had grown into a social network of 100,000 members.

In 2015, Hackaday's owner, Supplyframe, acquired the hardware marketplace Tindie.

In 2021, Hackaday's owner, Supplyframe, was acquired by Siemens.

== See also ==
- Instructables
- Thingiverse
- TorrentFreak
