= Çukurova University =

Turkish public university located in Adana

- Çukurova Üniversitesi
- Type: Public research university
- Established: 1973; 53 years ago
- Rector: Hamit Emrah Beriş
- Administrative staff: 2,297
- Students: 48,173
- Location: Adana, Turkey; 37°03′26″N 35°21′21″E
- Campus: Urban, 22,000 decares
- Colors: Green
- Website: cu.edu.tr

University rankings

Regional – Overall
- QS Emerging Europe and Central Asia: 189 (2022)

Çukurova University (Turkish: Çukurova Üniversitesi) is a public research university located in Adana, Turkey. The university features sixteen faculties, three colleges, seven vocational colleges, three institutes, and twenty-six research and application centers. Its campus is situated 10 kilometres (6.2 mi) from Adana city center, adjacent to the Seyhan Dam Lake. Çukurova University has a teaching staff of 1,903 and provides education to more than 40,000 undergraduate, postgraduate, and doctoral students. The university library offers internet access and a wide range of national and international publications. Computer rooms are available throughout the campus, serving both as resources for students and as facilities for computer-assisted education and scientific research.

The university provides a variety of recreational facilities for students, including an indoor sports center, a swimming pool, a boathouse, and multiple sports grounds. Additionally, students can engage in extracurricular activities through 29 student clubs. Students also have the opportunity to gain practical experience abroad through organizations such as AIESEC. Transportation to the Balcalı Campus is facilitated by private bus services.

== History ==
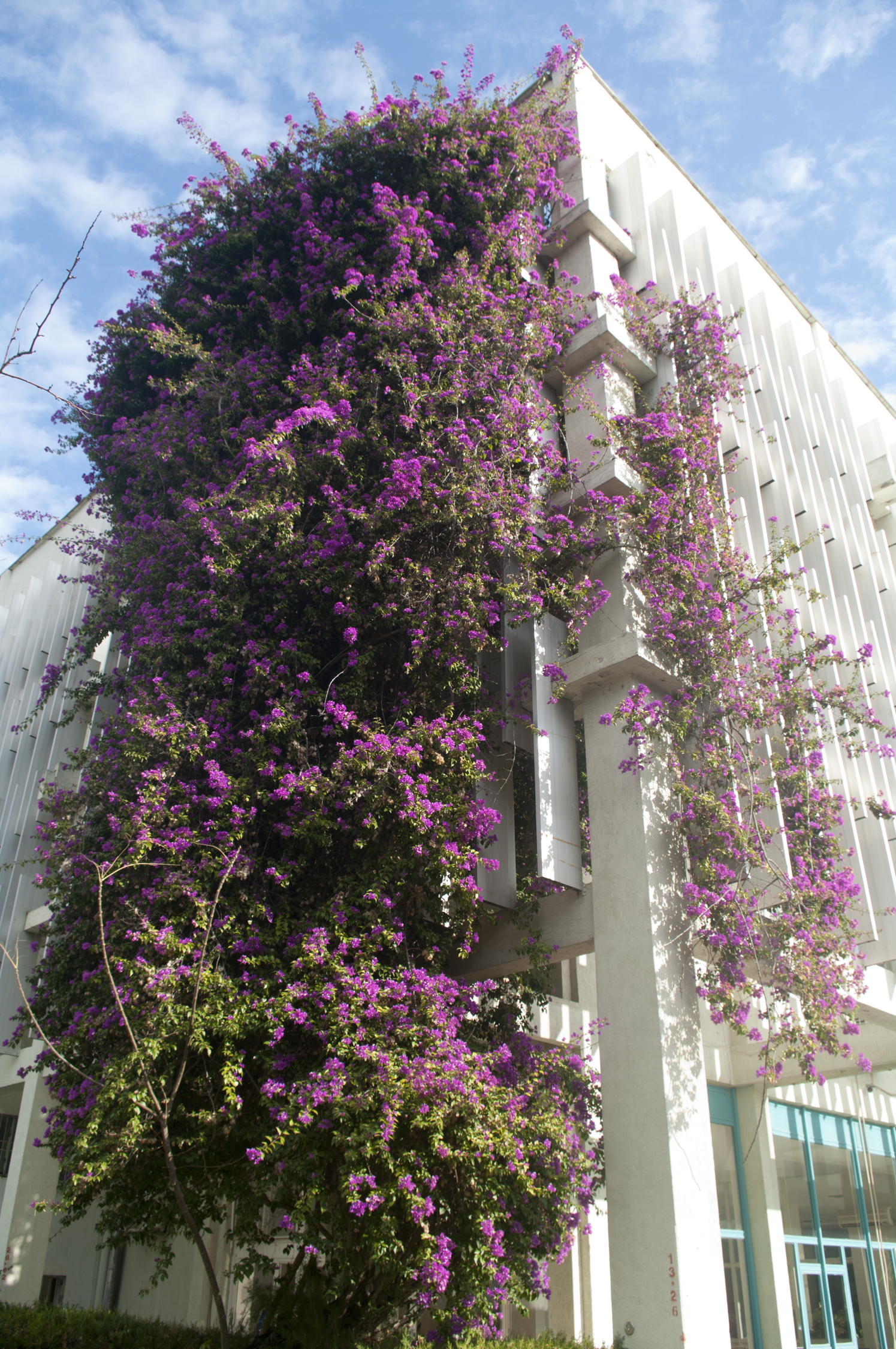
A view of southwestern corner of the main administration building of Faculty of Medicine

Çukurova University was officially established in 1973 through the merger of the Faculty of Agriculture, founded in 1969 by Ankara University, and the Faculty of Medicine, founded in 1972 by Atatürk University. Initially comprising these two faculties, the university expanded to five faculties with the establishment of the Faculties of Basic Sciences, Administrative Sciences, and Engineering. In 1982, the Faculty of Basic Sciences was reorganized as the Faculty of Sciences and Letters, while the Faculty of Administrative Sciences merged with the Department of Economics and Administrative Sciences to form the Faculty of Administrative Sciences and Economics. The Faculty of Engineering and Architecture was created by combining the Faculty of Engineering with the Engineering Department of the Adana Academy of Administrative and Commercial Sciences. The Faculty of Education was also established through the unification of two-year Foreign Language Colleges from Adana, Mersin, and Hatay.

By 1992, the university played a key role in the establishment of three new universities in Turkey. Two colleges, equipped with modern facilities and laboratories, were transferred to Mersin University, three colleges to Hatay Mustafa Kemal University, and the Research and Application Center in Kahramanmaraş to Sütçü İmam University.

The university's growth continued with the establishment of additional faculties, including Fisheries, Theology, Dentistry, and Fine Arts, bringing the total number of faculties to ten. New vocational colleges, such as the Adana Vocational College of Health and Kozan Vocational College, were opened. By incorporating three postgraduate institutes and the State Conservatory of Çukurova University, the number of academic bodies increased to 21.

Further expansions included the creation of the Karataş College of Tourism and Hotel Management in 1994, the Karaisalı Vocational College in 1995, and the Vocational College of Kadirli in 1997, which offered programs in Computer Programming and Industrial Electronics. The Department of Physical Education was reorganized as the College of Physical Education and Sports, and the Vocational College of Health Services became the College of Health Sciences in 1996.

== Campus ==
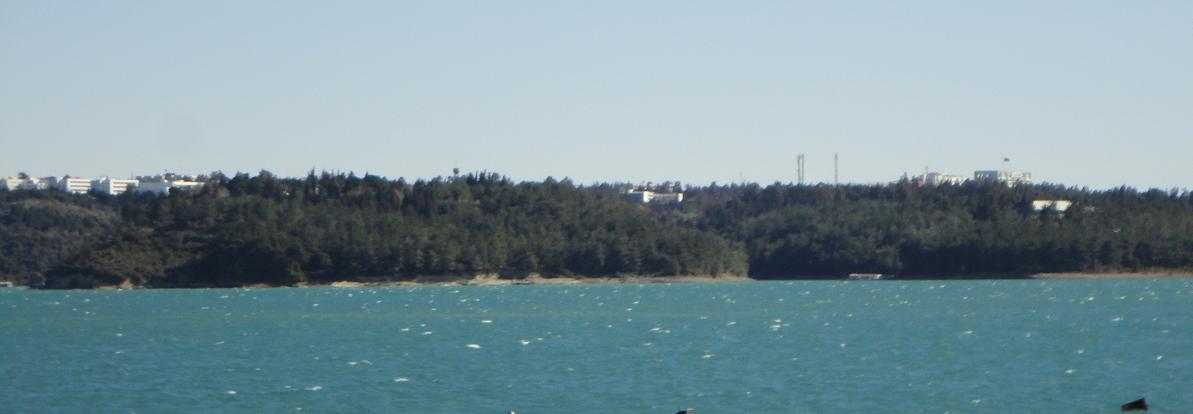
Lakeview from Balcalı Campus

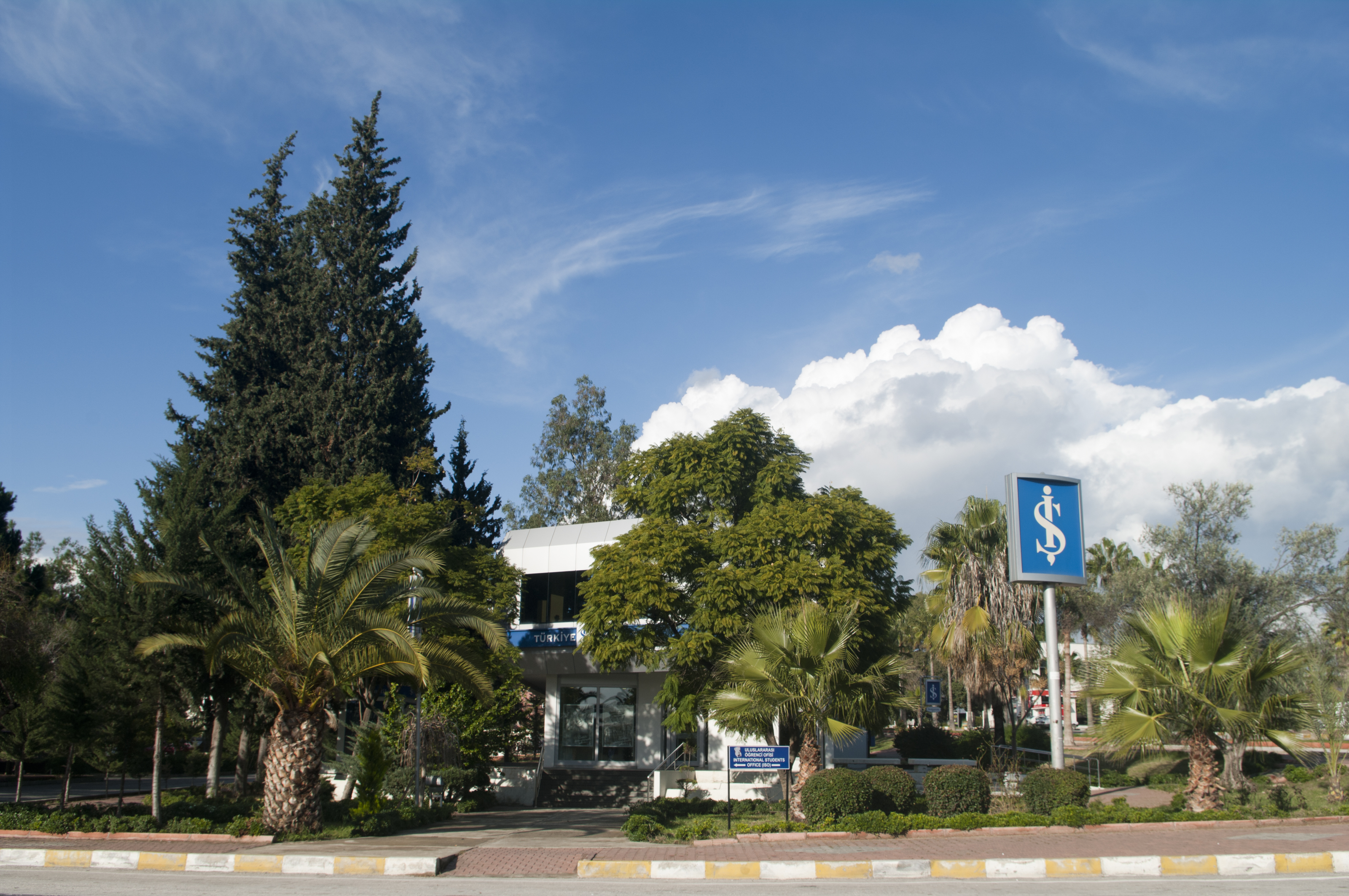
A bank branch office at Çukurova University Campus.

The Balcalı Campus of Çukurova University is located on the eastern side of Seyhan Lake, covering an area of 20 km^{2}. The name "Balcalı" derives from the village that previously occupied the site before the university's construction.

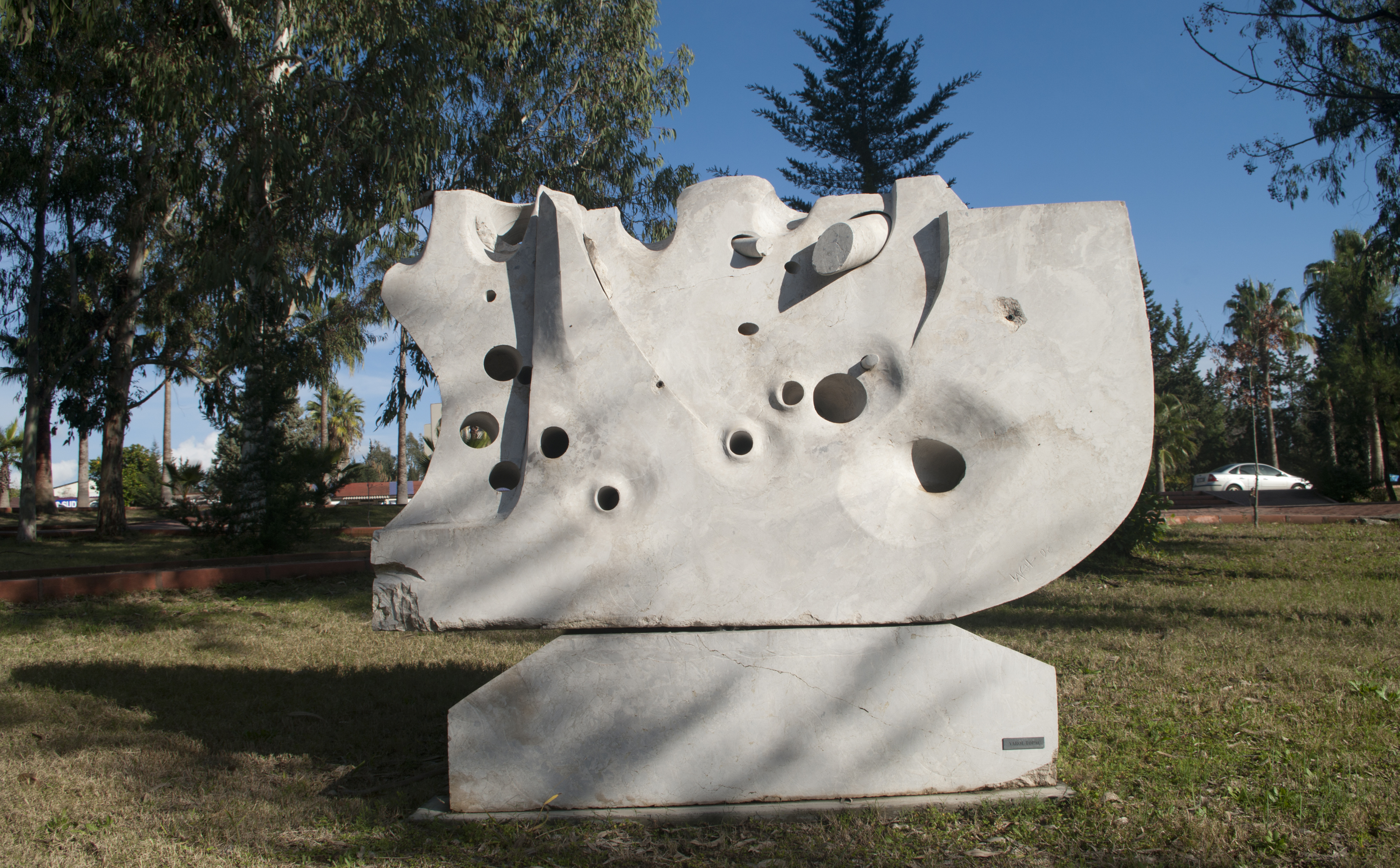
Sculpture at the campus

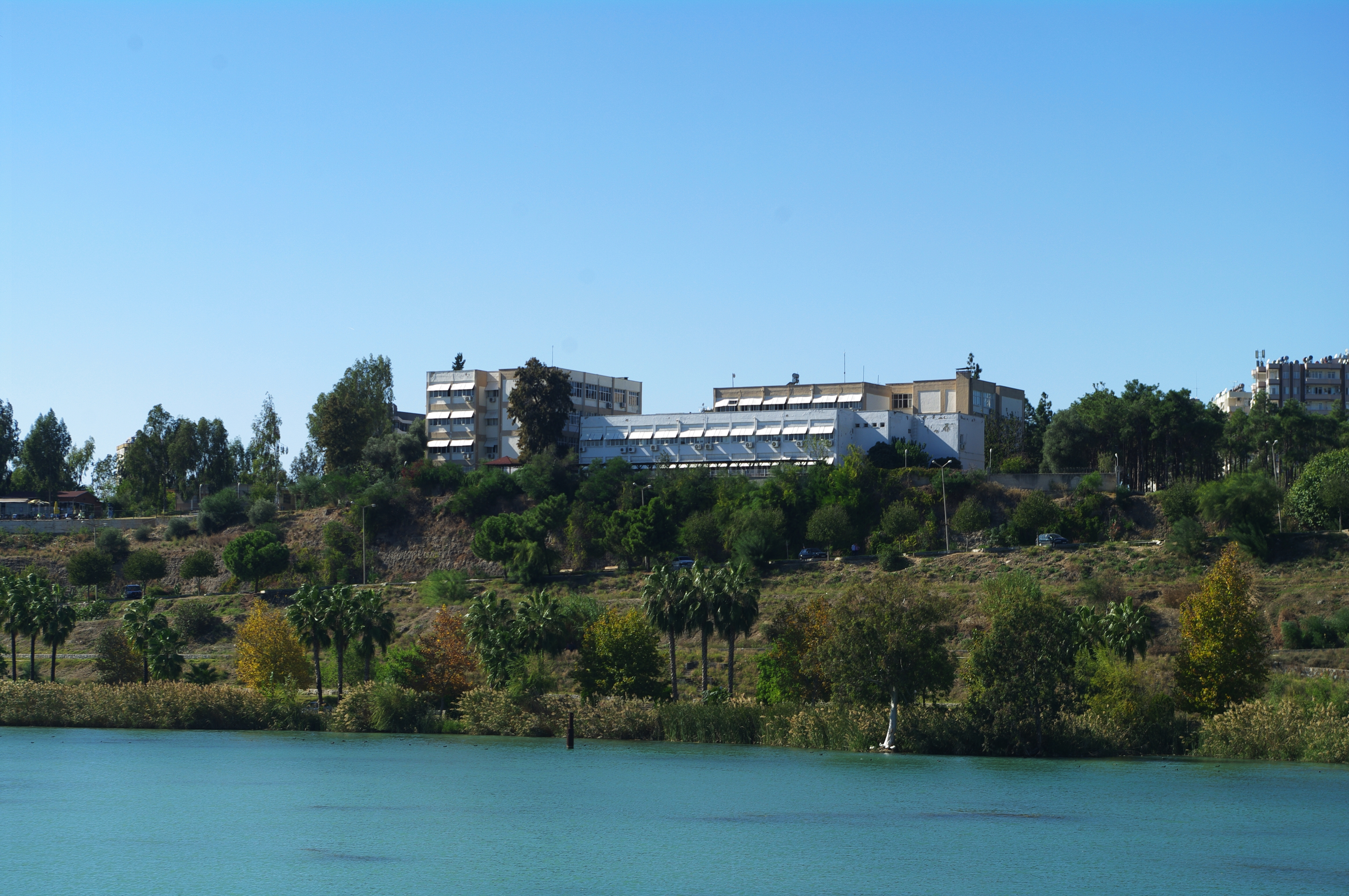
Vocational School in Çukurova University Campus

The campus features administrative and educational buildings, including laboratories supporting research services across various disciplines. It also houses a hospital complex, a central library, a central cafeteria, sports facilities, faculty residences, social facilities, and dormitories with a total capacity of 3,500 students.

Public transportation connects the campus to the city center, providing convenient access for students and staff.

== Organisation ==
- Ceyhan Faculty of Engineering
- Faculty of Dentistry
- Faculty of Education: Education Science, Teacher Training in Religious Culture and Ethics, Special Education, Foreign Language Education, Computer Education and Instructional Technology, Social Sciences Education, Fine Arts Education, Elementary Education
- Faculty of Arts and Sciences: Biology, Physics, Chemistry, Mathematics, Turkish Language and Literature, Statistics
- Faculty of Economics and Administrative Sciences: Economy, Business, Finance, Econometrics, International Relations
- Faculty of Theology: Fundamental Islamic Sciences, Philosophy and Religious Studies, Islamic History and Arts
- Faculty of Communication: Communication
- Faculty of Fine Arts: Interior Design, Ceramic, Textile, Graphics
- Faculty of Law
- Faculty of Engineering: Computer Engineering, Environmental Engineering, Electrical and Electronic Engineering, Industrial Engineering, Civil Engineering, Geological Engineering, Mining Engineering, Mechanical Engineering, Automotive Engineering, Textile Engineering
- Faculty of Fisheries
- Faculty of Medicine
- Faculty of Agriculture: Agricultural Engineering, Food Engineering, Landscape Architecture

== Education ==
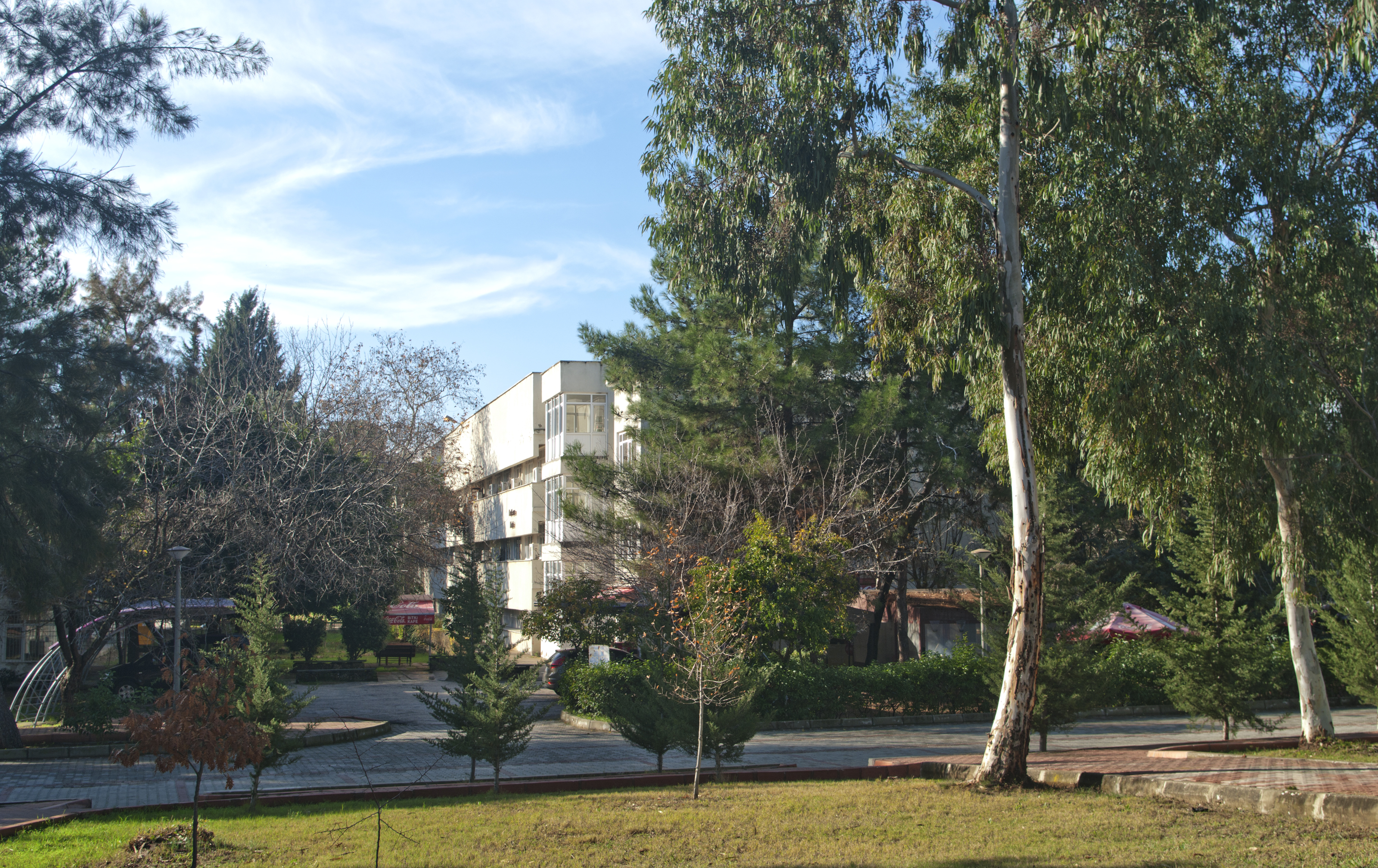
A view of eastern side of the building of Dept. of Plant Protection, Çukurova University.

The primary language of instruction at the university is Turkish. However, the Electric-Electronics and Mechanical Engineering Departments within the Faculty of Engineering and Architecture offer programs taught in English.

All programs within the Faculty of Economics and Administrative Sciences include compulsory English preparatory classes. Optional English preparatory classes are available for students enrolled in the Mathematics, Chemistry, and Physics Departments of the Faculty of Science and Letters, as well as the Civil Engineering, Geology, Architecture, Industrial Engineering, and Textile Engineering Departments of the Faculty of Engineering and Architecture.

Foreign language preparatory classes are provided in English, French, and German for students in the English, French, and German Language Teaching Departments of the Faculty of Education.

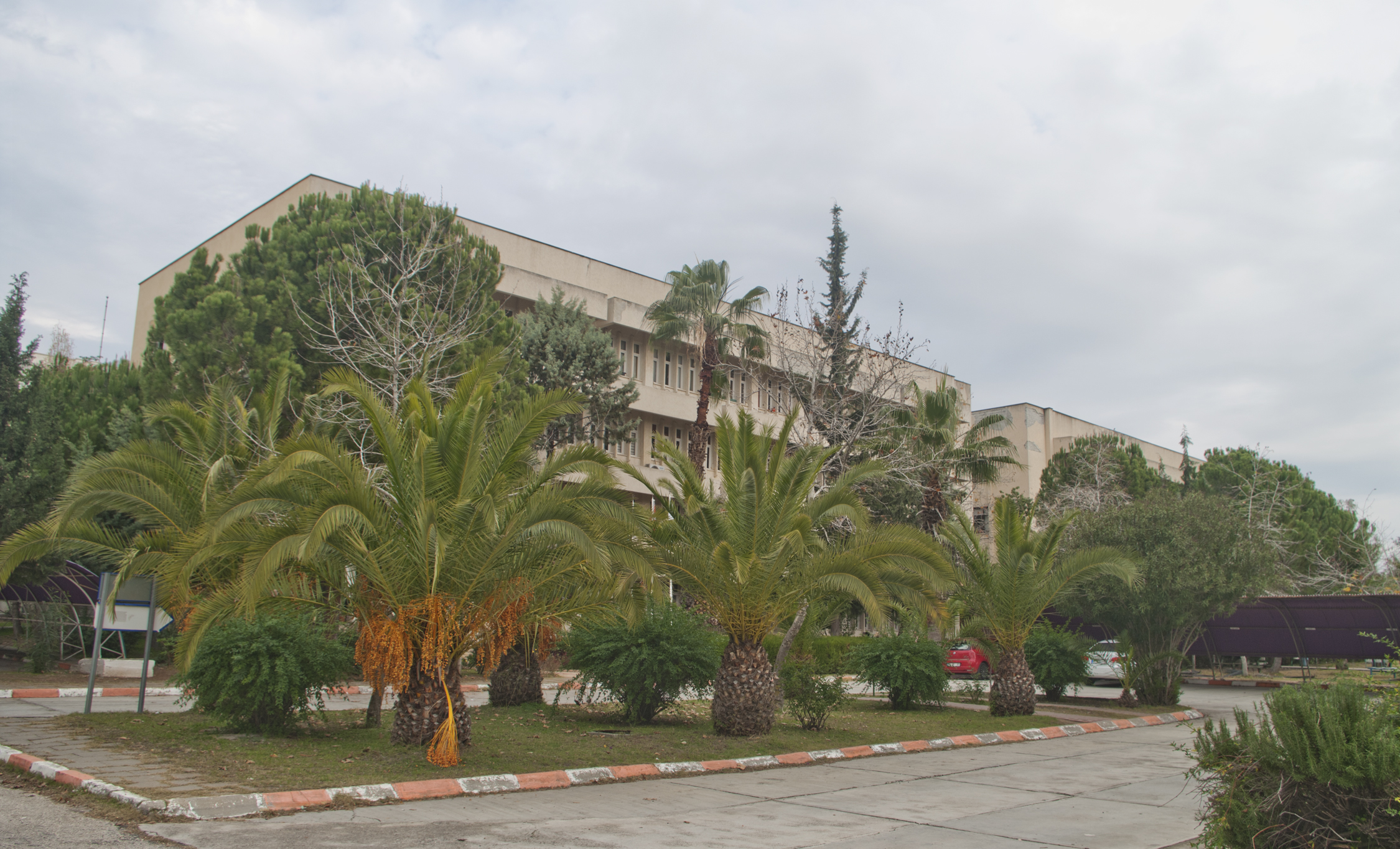
Faculty of Education at Çukurova University

The university is composed of 10 faculties offering 80 undergraduate programs, three graduate schools with 64 postgraduate programs, three colleges with four undergraduate programs, seven vocational colleges providing 23 vocational programs, and a state conservatory. Additionally, the Foreign Languages Research and Application Center (YADIM) offers English instruction for both undergraduate and postgraduate students. Evening classes are offered in various departments across the university, including the Department of Teacher Training in the Faculty of Education, the Departments of Economics and Business in the Faculty of Economics and Administrative Sciences, the Departments of Biology, Physics, Chemistry, Mathematics, and Turkish Language and Literature in the Faculty of Science and Letters, and the Departments of Civil, Mechanical, Geological, Industrial, and Mining Engineering in the Faculty of Engineering and Architecture. Evening classes are also available in the Faculty of Fisheries and all departments of the Ceyhan and Osmaniye Vocational Colleges.

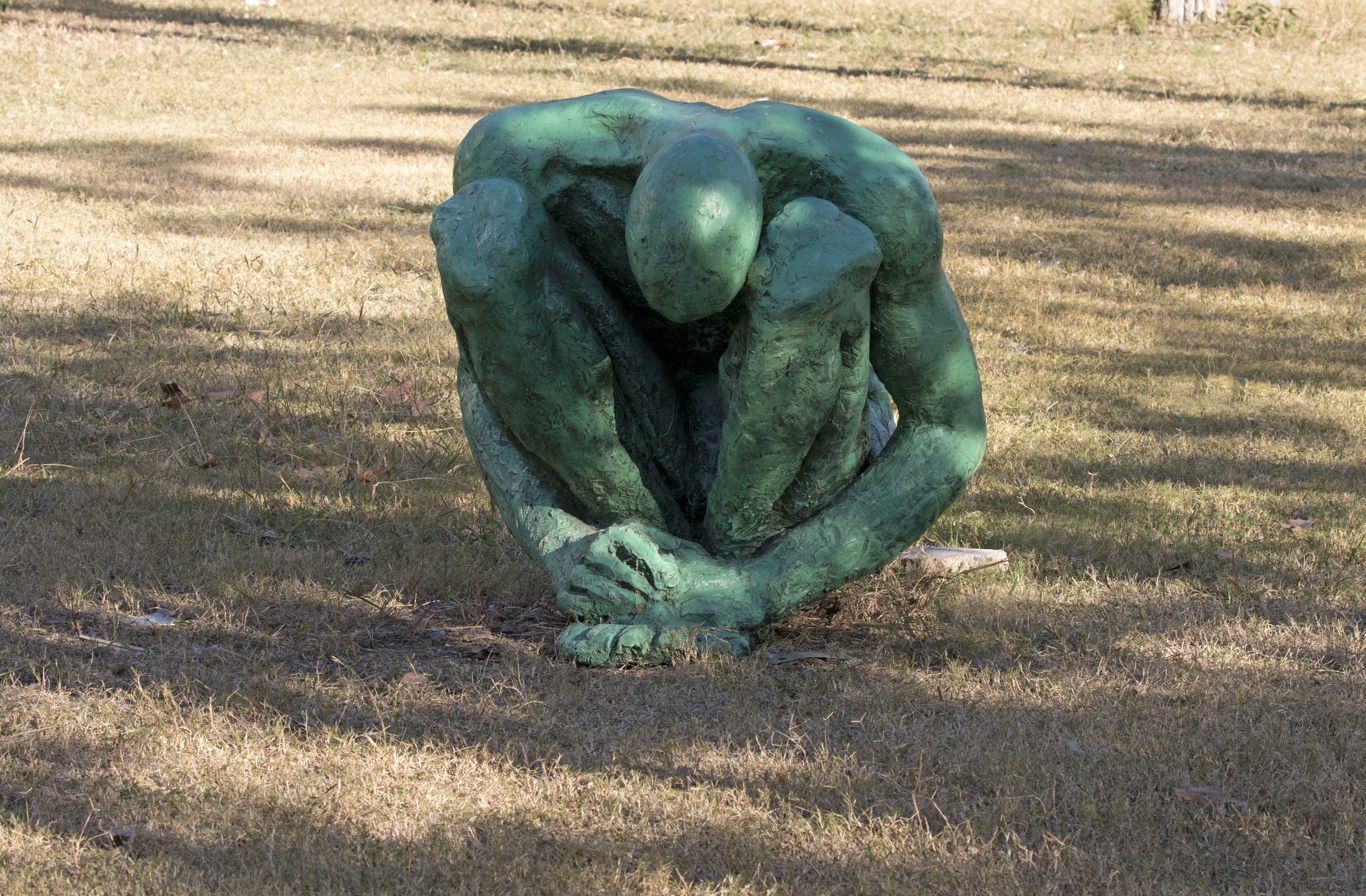
Sculpture at the campus

Çukurova University hosts numerous student societies, including the Çukurova University Equestrian Sports Club (ÇUASK). Founded in 2000, ÇUASK provides students and staff with opportunities to take horse riding lessons. The club maintains four Thoroughbred stallions for schooling purposes, and experienced members can explore campus trails on horseback. The club is managed by student volunteers who give lessons, care for the horses and stables, and oversee operations.

Çukurova University employs 1,903 academic staff members, including 24 from abroad. These include teaching faculty, research assistants, specialists, and lecturers, ensuring a comprehensive educational and research environment.

== International perspective ==
The university participates in the Erasmus Programme and maintains bilateral exchange agreements for students and faculty with the following partner universities.

- Bielefeld University of Applied Sciences (Germany)
- Klagenfurt University (Austria)
- University of Salzburg (Austria)
- Free University Brussels (Belgium)
- Ghent University (Belgium)
- Hasselt University (Belgium)
- Hogeschool Antwerpen (Belgium)
- Hogeschool Sint-Lukas Brussel (Belgium)
- Université libre de Bruxelles (Belgium)
- Provinciale Hogeschool Limburg (Belgium)
- Czech University of Life Sciences Prague (Czech Republic)
- Technical University of Liberec (Czech Republic)
- Masaryk University (Czech Republic)
- Jan Evangelista Purkyně University in Ústí nad Labem (Czech Republic)
- University of West Bohemia (Czech Republic)
- Aarhus University (Denmark)
- West Jutland University College (Denmark)
- Tallinn University (Estonia)
- Flensburg University (Finland)
- Helsinki University (Finland)
- Oulu University (Finland)
- Novia University of Applied Sciences (Finland)
- Swedish Polytechnic (Finland)
- Tampere University of Applied Sciences (Finland)
- Tampere University (Finland)
- Franche-Comté (France)
- François Rabelais (France)
- Paris-Sorbonne University (France)
- University of Corsica Pasquale Paoli (France)
- Anhalt University of Applied Sciences (Germany)
- Augsburg University (Germany)
- Bonn University (Germany)
- Dresden Technical University (Germany)
- University of Duisburg-Essen (Germany)
- University of Flensburg (Germany)
- Free University of Berlin (Germany)
- Friedrich-Alexander University (Germany)
- Hanover University of Applied Sciences and Arts (Germany)
- Heidelberg University (Germany)
- Hohenheim University (Germany)
- Humboldt University (Germany)
- Johannes Gutenberg University (Germany)
- Ludwigshafen University of Applied Sciences (Germany)
- Münster University (Germany)
- University of Oldenburg (Germany)
- Osnabrück University (Germany)
- Ruhr University Bochum (Germany)
- Siegen University (Germany)
- Technical University Darmstadt (Germany)
- Technische Universitat Bergakademie Freiberg (Germany)
- Technische Universitat Berlin (Germany)
- University of Ulm (Germany)
- Aristotle University of Thessaloniki (Greece)
- University of Crete (Greece)
- Ionian University (Greece)
- Mediterranean Agronomic Institute of Chania (Greece)
- Technological Educational Institute of the Ionian Islands (Greece)
- Technological Educational Institute of Epirus (Greece)
- Corvinus University of Budapest (Hungary)
- Debrecen University (Hungary)
- Kodolányi János University (Hungary)
- Pecs University (Hungary)
- Semmelweis University (Hungary)
- Bologna University (Italy)
- University of Naples Federico II (Italy)
- University of Padua (Italy)
- Palermo University (Italy)
- Roma Tre University (Italy)
- University of Sassari (Italy)
- University of Modena and Reggio Emilia (Italy)
- University of Trento (Italy)
- University of Catania (Italy)
- University of L'Aquila (Italy)
- University of Pisa (Italy)
- University of Daugavpils (Latvia)
- International School of Law and Business (Lithuania)
- Norwegian University of Science and Technology (Norway)
- Tromsø University College (Norway)
- Adam Mickiewicz University (Poland)
- Szczecin University of Technology (Poland)
- Pedagogical University of Kraków (Poland)
- University of Life Sciences in Lublin (Poland)
- Bialystok University of Technology (Poland)
- Nicolaus Copernicus University in Toruń (Poland)
- Szczecin University of Technology (Poland)
- Szkola Glowna Gospodarstwa Wiejskiego (Poland)
- Warsaw Agricultural University (Poland)
- Warsaw University (Poland)
- Algarve University (Portugal)
- University of Lisbon (Portugal)
- Minho University (Portugal)
- Porto University (Portugal)
- University of Trás-os-Montes and Alto Douro (Portugal)
- Ovidius University of Constanța (Romania)
- George Emil Palade University of Medicine, Pharmacy, Science and Technology of Târgu Mureș (Romania)
- University of Agronomic Sciences and Veterinary Medicine of Bucharest (Romania)
- University of Ss. Cyril and Methodius (Slovakia)
- Slovak University of Agriculture (Slovakia)
- Polytechnic University of Catalonia (Spain)
- Jaume I University (Spain)
- University of Lleida (Spain)
- Polytechnic University of Cartagena (Spain)
- Madrid Royal Conservatory (Spain)
- Universidade de Santiago de Compostela (Spain)
- University of Girona (Spain)
- University of Borås (Sweden)
- Linköping University (Sweden)
- Lulea University of Technology (Sweden)
- Linnaeus University (Sweden)
- Delft University (The Netherlands)
- Eindhoven University of Technology (The Netherlands)
- Wageningen University (The Netherlands)
- Edinburgh University (United Kingdom)
- Huddersfield University (United Kingdom)
- Lancaster University (United Kingdom)
- University of Nottingham (United Kingdom)

== Notable alumni ==
- Turgay Avcı — Politician and Deputy Prime Minister and Minister of Foreign Affairs of the Turkish Republic of Northern Cyprus
- Hüseyin Dündar — World and European champion of martial arts disciplines
- Fuat Oktay — First Vice President of Turkey
- Macit Özcan — Politician and mayor of Mersin
- Ali Pilli — Minister of Health of the 41st government of Northern Cyprus
- Barış Karabıyık — Association footballer and politician
