= Calavance =

Calavance may refer to several kinds of edible dry bean or foods made from them:

- Hyacinth bean (most commonly)
- Chickpea, probably connected etymologically
- More generally, any bean
