= ENSCONET =

European Native Seeds Conservation Network

The European Native Seeds Conservation Network (ENSCONET) was a conservation project for the preservation of wild species by maintaining a germplasm bank. It was initially made up of 24 institutions from 17 member states of the European Union, as well as 5 associate members. The network was coordinated by the Millennium Seed Bank of the Royal Botanic Gardens, Kew, United Kingdom and was founded under the auspices of the 6th "Research Framework Program" of the EU, and covered 5 of the 6 European biogeographic regions.

== History ==
Although the project had been in the making for several years, it was not until November 2004 that it was definitively consolidated. The first annual meeting of ENSCONET took place at the Mediterranean Agronomic Institute of Chania, in Crete in June 2005. At this time, the drafting of a protocol agreed by all the members for future collections began. The next annual meeting took place in Valencia and was organized by the Botanical Garden of Valencia. In total, 5 annual meetings and 10 management meetings were held. The project concluded in October 2009.

== Main activities ==
The work carried out by the associated institutions within the network can be summarized in 4 sections

- Collecting the seeds preferably from their natural environment, identifying the place and conditions of the specimens from which the sample is taken.
- Conservation, with the latest methods that guarantee its viability for the longest period of time possible.
- Database, containing all possible information about the specimen from which the seeds are collected, its location, date of collection, state in which it was found. All these data can be recorded both in writing and in computer support
- Dissemination of all the work carried out within the community of the institutions involved, with a view to improving the collection and conservation methods with the latest techniques among the member institutions, as well as in a more general scope to other institutions outside the field of participating members.

== Member institutions ==
The network was initially made up of 24 organisations from 17 countries. Later during the project, 5 additional full and 7 associate members were incorporated.

The 24 original full members were:

1. Royal Botanic Gardens, Kew, United Kingdom
2. National and Kapodistrian University of Athens
3. Institute of Botany, Slovak Academy of Sciences, Bratislava
4. Budapest Zoo and Botanical Garden, Budapest
5. Mediterranean Agronomic Institute of Chania, Crete
6. IMGEMA- Botanical Garden of Córdoba, Córdoba
7. Botanical Garden, Trinity College Dublin
8. Botanical Garden of Gran Canaria, Canary Islands
9. Agricultural Research Institute Cyprus
10. Bank of Plant Germplasm-UPM, Polytechnic University of Madrid, Madrid
11. Meise Botanic Garden, Meise
12. Museum National d'Histoire Naturelle, Paris
13. University of Pavia / Centro Flora Autóctona della Lombardia, Pavia
14. University of Pisa, Botanical Garden, Pisa
15. Botanical Garden of Soller, islas Baleares
16. Tridentine Museum of Natural Sciences Trento, Trento
17. Botanical Garden, University of Valencia, Valencia
18. University of Vienna, Vienna
19. Botanical Garden Polish Academy of Sciences Warsaw, Warsaw
20. Botanical Gardens and Botanical Museum Berlin-Dahlem, FU Berlin
21. Helsingin yliopisto, Helsinki
22. Jardim Botânico - Foundation of the University of Lisbon, Lisbon
23. Natural History Museum, University of Oslo, Oslo
24. Institute of Botany - Bulgarian Academy of Sciences, Sofia

== Outputs ==
- ENSCONET Seed Collecting Manual For Wild Species
- ENSCONET Curation Protocols & Recommendations
- ENSCOBASE: the ENSCONET Virtual Seed Bank
