= UK Native Seed Hub =

UK native plant conservation project

The UK Native Seed Hub
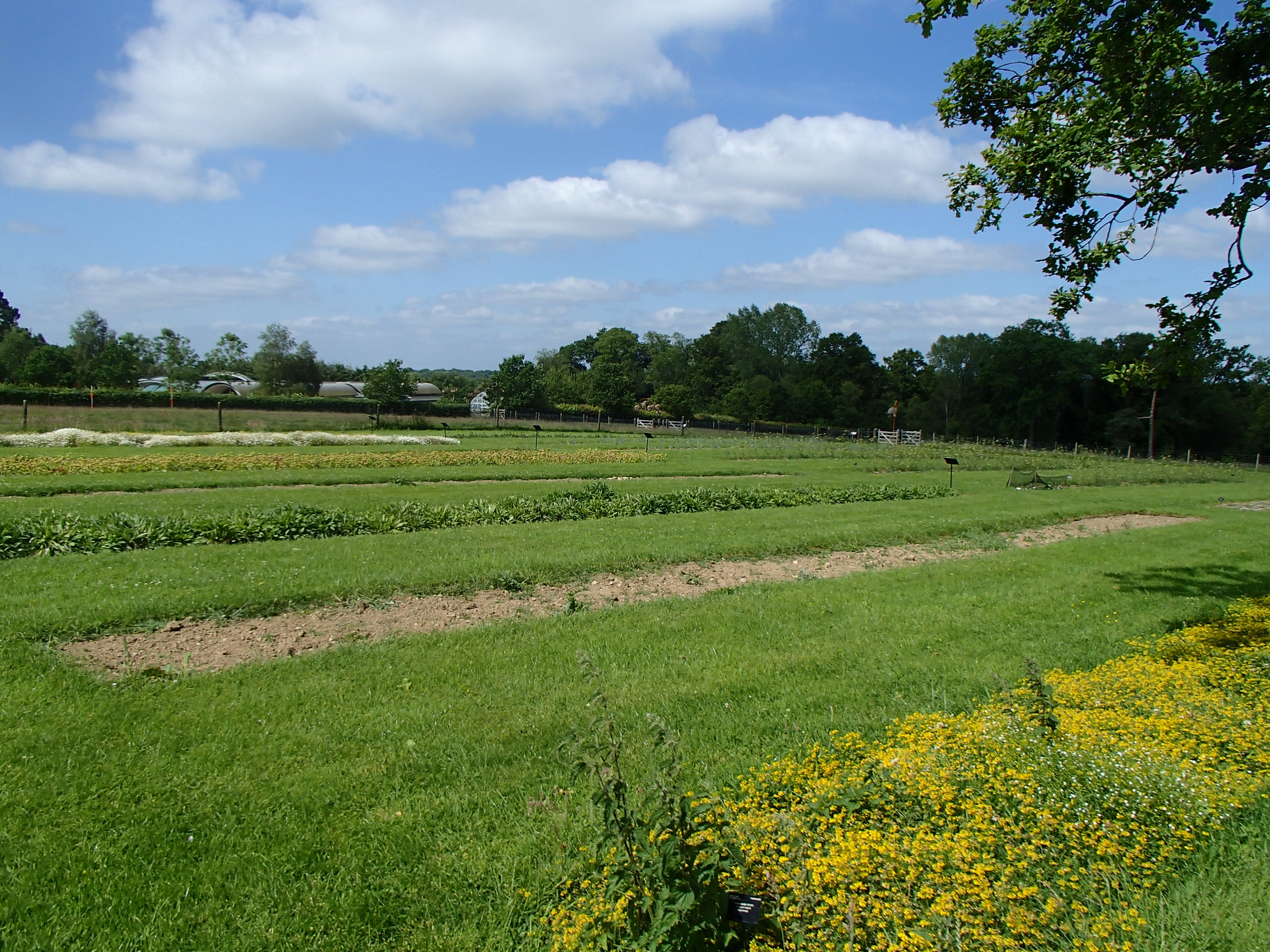
- The UKNSH production beds, with the Millennium Seed Bank building behind
- Location: Sussex, England
- Opened: 2011
- Website: www.kew.org/science/our-science/projects/uk-native-seed-hub

The UK Native Seed Hub (UKNSH) is a project of the Royal Botanic Gardens, Kew's Millennium Seed Bank Partnership growing and distributing seeds of UK native plant species. It is in part a response to the 2010 report Making Space for Nature by Sir John Lawton. The project, located at Wakehurst Place, in West Sussex, in the High Weald of southern England (grid reference TQ340315), is dedicated to enhancing the resilience and coherence of the UK's ecological networks by improving the quality, quantity, and diversity of UK seed species available for use in conservation, rehabilitation, and restoration projects.

The UKNSH makes available to conservation and restoration projects high quality Millennium Seed Bank seed collections, some of which are of species that are not available on the commercial seed market, and some are local provenance collections of species already available. As part of the Royal Botanic Gardens, the UKNSH is a nonprofit organization which provides seeds under a license agreement, ensuring use of the seed only for projects that directly support UK biodiversity and at a charge that only recoups the financial cost of recollection to replace seeds in the bank.

The provision of seed may be accompanied by technical training, advice and research that enable users of the seed and other commercial seed suppliers to improve the knowledge, use, and storage of native seed in the UK.

== History ==
In 2011 the Esmée Fairbairn Foundation gave £750,000 to the Royal Botanical Gardens, Kew to establish the UKNSH as part of the foundation's 50th Birthday celebrations. The funding was expected to establish the project over a period of four years. Production began at the Wakehurst place nursery in 2011. In 2012 seed production moved to the new production beds that are on display to the public at Wakehurst Place. Production focused on regenerating grassland species such as Campanula rotundifolia (harebell) and Genista tinctoria (dyer's greenweed) from seed in the Millennium Seed Bank's collections. In May 2014 suitable seed from the Millennium Seed Bank's collections were made available by the UKNSH seed online list, making it possible for legitimate conservation projects to request seed from the available UKNSH collections.

== The Seed Hub ==
The Seed Hub itself is the Wakehurst Place-based production site, with a capacity of 28 beds on about a hectare of land in total, close to the Millennium Seed Bank building and the Visitor Centre (and shown on the visitor's map). The site began construction in 2011 and is maintained by Kew's horticultural staff. Seed production is focused on species that are difficult to obtain on the commercial market, due to harvesting, germination, or processing difficulties. Species are often regenerated to create a large collection of seeds of a particular UK provenance, such as the South Downs' Primula veris (cowslip), or from a particular environmental habitat. The site is also open to the public as part of a visit to Wakehurst, and provides a useful environment to observe and photograph plant pollinators.

== The Seed List ==
To support UK conservation and restoration projects the UKNSH makes the Millennium Seed Bank's high quality, UK origin seeds available to legitimate initiatives aiming to improve the UKs ecological network. A few of these collections are supplied from the production beds at Wakehurst Place with some being made available from the suitable collections seed bank at the MSBP. Seed is only provided from appropriate collections in the MSBP when the collection is sufficiently large. Where there is not sufficient seed numbers to make a collection available for distribution the species may be bulked up on the production beds. All seed provided is "F1" generation in that is it the offspring of plants harvested from seeds collected directly from the wild. The seed list operates in such a way that the provision of seed to conservation projects will never completely deplete the collection in the bank.

== Support ==
The UKNSH also provides a range of training for seeds producers, collectors, and users. This support ensures that seed users understand the importance of high quality seed of a UK origin for UK conservation work, as well as providing them with the skills needed to use the seed. The support also ensures that appropriate species and provenance seeds are used for the projects location and habitat. Support covers the entire range of seed handling from harvesting, through processing, testing, and storage, to distribution, and sowing. The aim of this support is to improve best practice in UK native seed use. The UKNSH provides advice and services through consultancy to enable the continuation of the project beyond the four year funding of the Esmée Fairbairn Foundation.
