= Christine H. Sophie Kabuye =

Ugandan botanist (* 1938)

Christine H. Sophie Kabuye (born 1938) is an ethnobotanist from Uganda. From 1971 to 1994, she served as botanist in charge of the East African Herbarium in Nairobi, Kenya.

== Early life and education ==
Christine H. Sophie Kabuye was born in 1938 in Uganda.

In 1964, Kabuye graduated from Makerere University with a Bachelor of Science degree in botany and zoology.

== Career ==
In 1966, Kabuye traveled to Europe to work at the Royal Botanic Gardens, Kew, where she focused her research on flowering plants in the Oxalidaceae family. Her research on Oxalidaceae was later included in the Royal Botanic Gardens' Flora of Tropical East Africa. While in Europe, she also visited herbariums across Sweden, France, Italy, and other countries. She would later return to Europe to study Indigenous knowledge at Leiden University and the Mediterranean Agronomic Institute of Chania.

Kabuye is an expert in the ethnobotany and Indigenous knowledge of East Africa. Her taxonomic specialties include Oxalidaceae and Poaceae. She has worked both to collect plant specimens and to explore their use in partnership with Indigenous groups such as the Maasai.

From 1971 to 1994, Kabuye administrated the East African Herbarium at the National Museums of Kenya, which she had first joined in 1964. She also led the Kenya Resource Center for Indigenous Knowledge from 1992 to 1996. She represented Kenya in the negotiations around the 1993 Convention on Biological Diversity. From 1994 to 1996, she served as president of the International Society of Ethnobiology.

In 1985, Kabuye spent time in the United States working at the Smithsonian Institution and Southern Methodist University. She was later chosen as a fellow at Australian National University in 1988.

After retiring from the East African Herbarium, Kabuye returned to Uganda, where she worked as a part-time lecturer at Makerere University beginning in 2004.

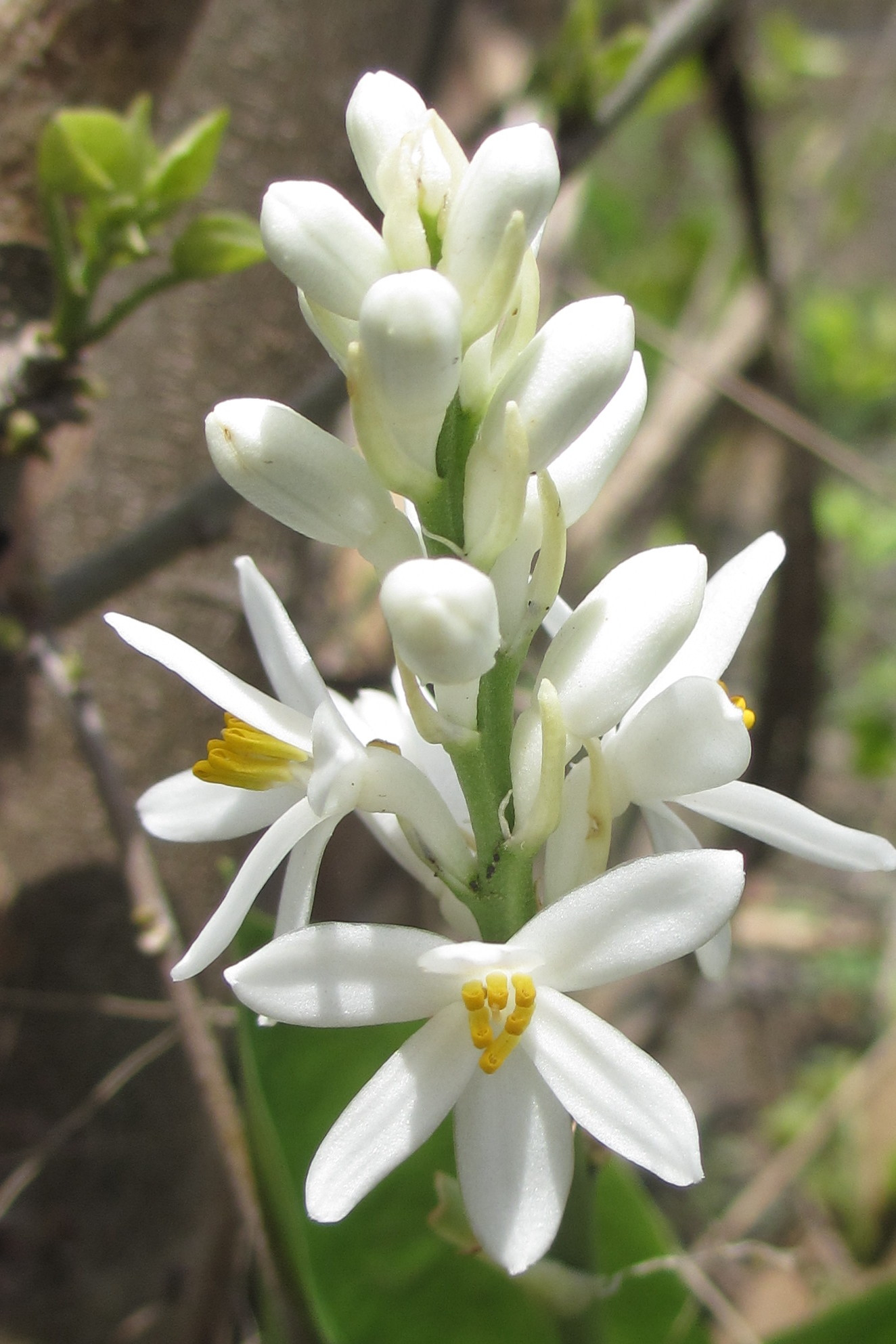
Kabuyea hostifolia, the one known species in the Kabuyea genre named for Christine H. Sophie Kabuye

== Recognition ==
In 1997, Kabuye received the J.W. Harshberger Medal and E.K. Janaki Ammal Medal from the Indian Society of Ethnobotanists.

The East African plant genus Kabuyea is named in her honor, as well as the tree species Diospyros kabuyeana.
