= Roger Smith (biologist) =

Roger Smith is a UK biologist and founder of the Millennium Seed Bank Project. He was awarded an OBE in the 2000 New Year Honours List for services to the project.

Smith joined the Royal Botanic Gardens, Kew in 1974, after graduating from Manchester University with a BSc in botany.
