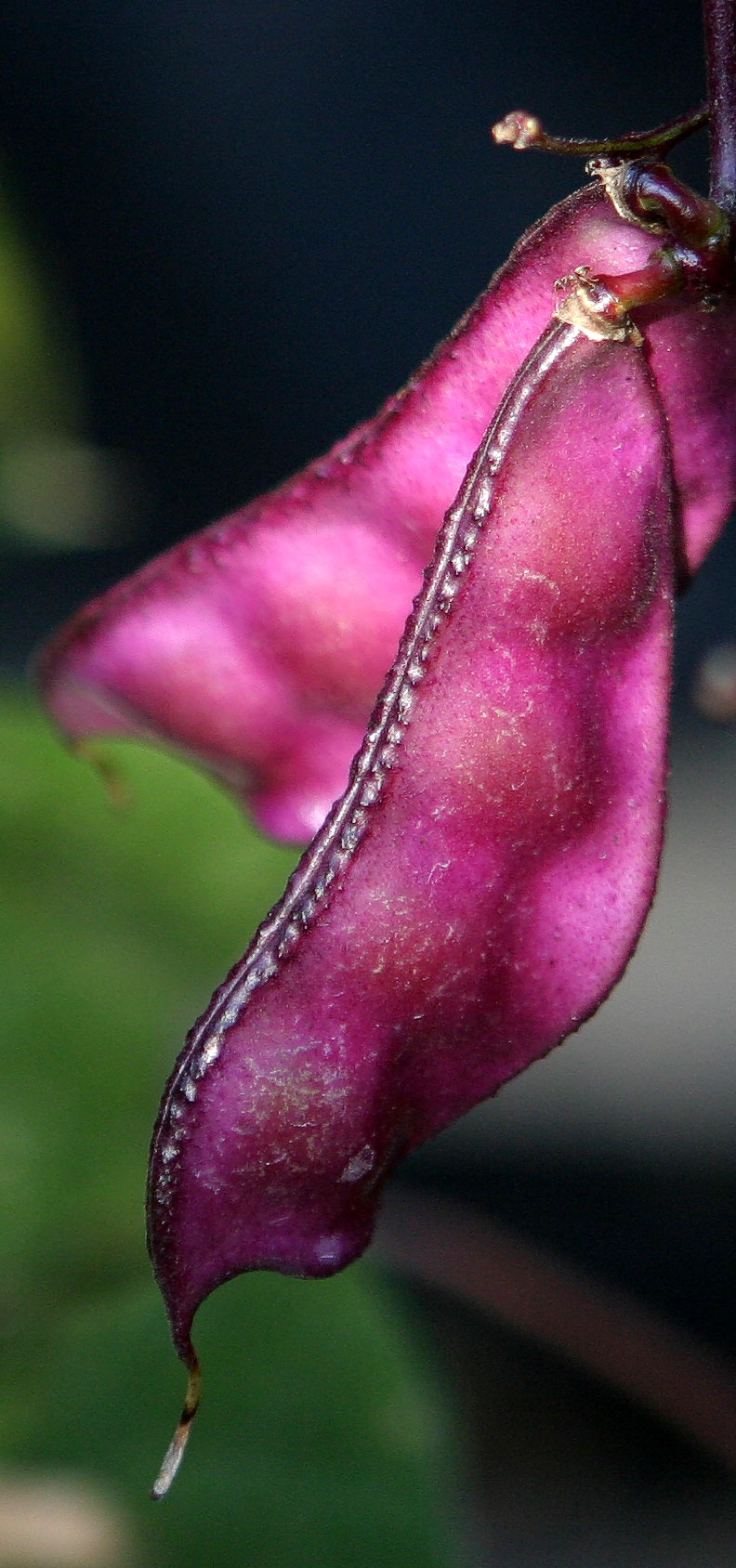
- Pod

Scientific classification
- Kingdom: Plantae
- Clade: Tracheophytes
- Clade: Angiosperms
- Clade: Eudicots
- Clade: Rosids
- Order: Fabales
- Family: Fabaceae
- Subfamily: Faboideae
- Genus: Lablab; Adans. (1763)
- Species: L. purpureus

Binomial name
- Lablab purpureus (L.) Sweet (1826)

Subspecies and varieties
- Lablab purpureus subsp. bengalensis (Jacq.) Verdc.; Lablab purpureus subsp. purpureus; Lablab purpureus var. rhomboideus (Schinz) Verdc.; Lablab purpureus subsp. uncinatus Verdc.

Synonyms
- Lablavia D.Don (1834); Dolichos lablab L.; Dolichos purpureus L. (1763); Lablab niger Medikus; Lablab lablab (L.) Lyons; Lablab vulgaris (L.) Savi; Vigna aristata Piper

= Lablab =

Genus of plant

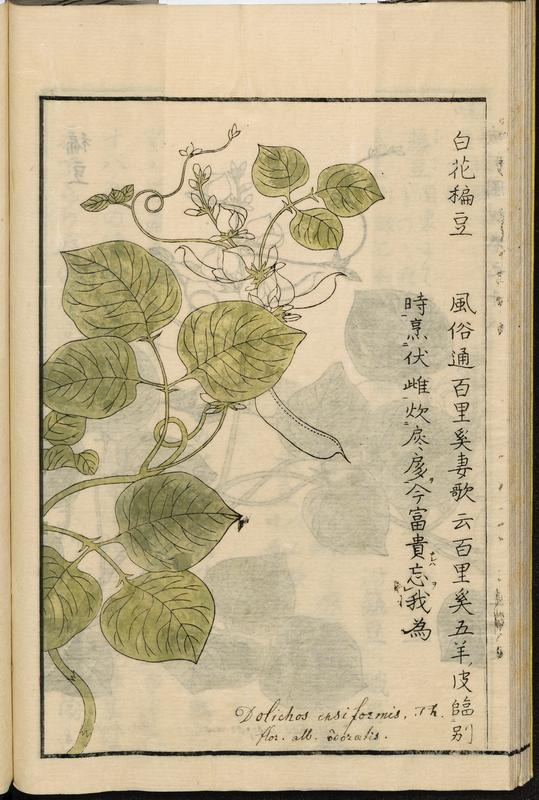
Lablab purpureus, illustration from the Japanese agricultural encyclopedia Seikei Zusetsu (1804)

Lablab purpureus is a species of bean in the family Fabaceae. It is native to sub-Saharan Africa and it is cultivated throughout the tropics for food. English language common names include hyacinth bean, lablab-bean bonavist bean/pea, dolichos bean, seim or sem bean, lablab bean, Egyptian kidney bean, Indian bean, bataw and Australian pea. Lablab is a monotypic genus.

== Taxonomy ==
The name lablab which is also capitalized as its genus name is given by Robert Sweet from the previous name of Dolichos lablab by Carl Linnaeus, its epithet comes from Arabic: لَبْلَاب, romanized: lablāb.

=== Subspecific classification ===
According to the British biologist and taxonomist Bernard Verdcourt,

there are two cultivated subspecies of Lablab purpureus (L.) Sweet:
- Lablab purpureus subsp. bengalensis (Jacq.) Verdc. (Syn.: Dolichos bengalensis Jacq., Dolichos lablab subsp. bengalensis (Jacq.) Rivals, Lablab niger subsp. bengalensis (Jacq.) Cuf.)
- Lablab purpureus subsp. purpureus
in addition to one wild subspecies:
- Lablab purpureus subsp. uncinatus
of which a special variant with lobed leaflets exists only in Namibia:
- Lablab purpureus var. rhomboïdeus (Schinz).

== Description ==
The plant is variable due to extensive breeding in cultivation, but in general, they are annual or short-lived perennial vines. The wild species is perennial. The thick stems can reach 6 meters (20 ft) in length. The leaves are made up of three pointed leaflets, each up to 15 centimeters (6 in) long. They may be hairy on the undersides. The inflorescence is made up of racemes of many flowers. Some cultivars have white flowers, and others may have purplish or blue.

The fruit is a legume pod variable in shape, size, and color. It is usually several centimeters long and bright purple to pale green. It contains up to four seeds. Depending on the cultivar, the seeds are white, brown, red, or black, sometimes with a white hilum. Wild plants have mottled seeds. The seed is about a centimeter long.

== Origin and occurrence ==
The exact origin of the lablab bean remains uncertain. Evidence of wild varieties in eastern and southern Africa suggests these regions as the likely source, although some theories suggest India as the origin.

Over the centuries, the lablab has been distributed all over the world. Despite its preference for tropical and subtropical climates, it can be found in temperate climates such as Central and South America or Italy. Its adaptability to different climates increases its agricultural value.

== Agronomy ==
The lablab bean remains most widespread in tropical and subtropical areas, particularly in eastern and southern Africa and India. There, the legume is grown primarily for food and fodder, but its cultivation has declined sharply in many regions of Africa, despite renewed interest in its soil-improving functions in multiple cropping systems. One of the main reasons for this decline is the replacement of faba bean by the common bean, but factors such as the many processing steps and antinutritional factors may also have played a role. In addition, lablab is often grown in home garden systems or mixed cropping systems, such as in Southeast Asia, making estimates of global production difficult.

=== Growing requirements ===
Lablab can grow on a wide range of soils, from sand to clay, within a pH range of 4.5 to 7.5. It is known to grow better in acidic conditions than most legumes, but does not grow well in poorly drained soils or in saline conditions. Average daily temperatures of 18–30 °C (64–86 °F) and annual rainfall of 700–3,000 mm (28–118 in) allow lablab cultivation. However, it can tolerate temperatures as low as 4 °C (39 °F) for short periods. The seedlings grow slowly, but once established they compete well with weeds and are able to tolerate drought or shade. Lablab requires well-drained soils as it is very intolerant of waterlogged or flooded conditions.

=== Cultivation, harvest and storage ===
As there is a high degree of variability in phenotypes, including relative maturity, yield, susceptibility to insect attack and drought resistance, cultivation can vary accordingly depending on the accession and environmental factors However, when lablab is first planted in a field, it is beneficial to inoculate the seeds with specialised rhizobium bacteria. The seeds are either broadcast and then covered, or sown to a depth of 5 cm (2.0 in) using the drillseed technique. The seedbed must be kept free of weeds in the early stages of growth, as the young plant succumbs easily to weed pressure.

It is generally accepted that harvesting fodder crops at the transition between the vegetative and reproductive stages gives the best compromise between yield and quality, as after this stage they become higher in fibre and lignin content and lower in protein content, leading to reduced digestibility and acceptability to livestock.

When lablab is stored as hay, the main challenge is the loss of dry matter from the leaves. Farmers suggest grinding it and storing it in bags. This can also prevent damage from direct sunlight or rain.

=== Soil improvements ===
Due to its symbiosis with nitrogen-fixing rhizobium bacteria, lablab bean has low soil fertility requirements and can be an important part of an agricultural system that improves soil nitrogen availability. The rate of nitrogen fixation has been shown to be highest when combined with phosphorus fertilisation, as phosphorus is required for rhizobium attachment to roots. Its cultivation also increases potassium and phosphorus availability. These soil-improving properties make lablab attractive for intercropping, mixed cropping systems and as a green manure. For example, intercropping lablab maize can improve multiple soil functions, including microbial diversity, with minimal to no loss of maize yield.

=== Breeding ===
Researchers suggest that the wide diversity of lablab germplasm has great potential for advancing the species as a promising alternative crop through selection and breeding.

Currently, most of the traditional cultivars grown have indeterminate growth habit, which has allowed farmers to harvest plants continuously. As such varieties aren't useful in the context of modern industrial farming, there has been a push to breed varieties that develop their seeds simultaneously, allowing all the beans to be collected in a single harvest. A side-effect of these breeding efforts has been a shortened vegetative phase, which reduces yield and hence economic value. Breeding objectives also differ between countries and between uses of the plants. In Australia, the focus is on creating a variety for fodder use by crossing pure line varieties with wild varieties from Africa, while researchers in Bangladesh and Africa are trying to increase the yield of existing varieties to increase their value in the food production system.

== Uses ==
Hyacinth-beans, immature seeds, prepared
Nutritional value per 100 g (3.5 oz)
- Energy: 209 kJ (50 kcal)
- Carbohydrates: 9.2 g
- Fat: 0.27 g
- Protein: 2.95 g
Vitamins and minerals
Vitamins	Quantity %DV^{†}
Thiamine (B1)	5% 0.056 mg
Riboflavin (B2)	7% 0.088 mg
Niacin (B3)	3% 0.48 mg
Folate (B9)	12% 47 μg
Vitamin C	6% 5.1 mg
Minerals	Quantity %DV^{†}
Calcium	3% 41 mg
Iron	4% 0.76 mg
Magnesium	10% 42 mg
Manganese	9% 0.21 mg
Phosphorus	4% 49 mg
Potassium	9% 262 mg
Zinc	3% 0.38 mg
- Link to USDA Database entry Cooked, boiled, drained, without salt
- ^{†}Percentages estimated using US recommendations for adults, except for potassium, which is estimated based on expert recommendation from the National Academies.

The hyacinth bean is an old domesticated pulse and multi-purpose crop. L. purpureus has been cultivated in India as early as 2500 BC.

Due to seed availability of one forage cultivar (cv. Rongai), it is often grown as forage for livestock and as an ornamental plant. In addition, it is cited both as a medicinal plant and a poisonous plant.

The fruit and beans are edible if boiled well with several changes of the water. Otherwise, they are toxic due to the presence of cyanogenic glycosides, glycosides that are converted to hydrogen cyanide when consumed. Signs of poisoning include weakness, vomiting, shortness of breath, twitching, stupor, and convulsions. It has been shown that there is a wide range of cyanogenic potential among the varieties.

The leaves are eaten raw or cooked like spinach. The flowers can be eaten raw or steamed. The root can be boiled or baked for food. The seeds are used to make tofu and tempeh.

=== Food in South Asia ===
In Bangladesh and West Bengal, the green pods along with the beans, known as śim (Bengali: শিম), are cooked as vegetables or cooked with fish as a curry.

In Gujarat, lablab is called surti papdi or valor. In Maharashtra, they are known as val papdi. In both states, they are commonly used to make sautéed, spiced vegetable dishes called sabjis.

In Kerala, it is known as amarakka, avara or amara payar (Malayalam: അമര പയർ). The beans as well as the bean pods are used in cooking curries. The bean pods are also used (along with spices) for preparing a stir-fried dish known as thoran.

In Tamil Nadu, it is called avarai or avaraikkaay (Tamil: அவரைக்காய் / அவரை). The entire bean is used in cooking dry curries and in sauces/gravies such as sambar. The seed alone is used in many recipes and is referred to as mochai (Tamil: மொச்சை / மொச்சைக்கொட்டை).

In Maharashtra, dry preparations with green masala are often made out of these green beans (ghevda varieties; Shravan ghevda (French beans), bajirao ghevda, ghevda, walwar, pavta sheng) mostly at the end of monsoon season during fasting festivals of Shravan month.

In Karnataka, the hyacinth bean is made into curry (avarekalu saaru) (Kannada: ಅವರೆಕಾಳು ಸಾರು), salad (avarekaalu usli), added to upma (avrekaalu uppittu), and as a flavoring to Akki rotti. Sometimes the outer peel of the seed is removed and the inner soft part is used for a variety of dishes. This form is called hitakubele avarekalu, which means "pressed (hitaku) hyacinth bean," and a curry known as hitikida avarekaalu saaru is made out of the deskinned beans.

In Telangana and Andhra Pradesh, the bean pods are cut into small pieces and cooked as a spicy curry in the Pongal festival season. Sometimes the outer peel of the seed when tender and soaked overnight is removed and the inner soft part is used for a variety of dishes. This form is called pitakapappu hanupa/anapa, which means "pressed (pitaku) hyacinth bean, and a curry known as pitikina anapaginjala chaaru/pitaka pappu is made from the deskinned beans and eaten along with bajra bread.

=== Food in Southeast and East Asia ===
In Myanmar, lablab beans are used to make a braised Burmese curry hnat (ပဲကြီးနှပ်). They are also crisp-fried and served in Burmese pickled tea leaf salad.

In Huế, Vietnam, hyacinth beans are the main ingredient of the dish chè đậu ván (Hyacinth Bean Sweet Soup).

In China, the seeds are known as Bai Bian Dou. They are usually dried and baked before being used in traditional Chinese herbal remedies to strengthen the spleen, reduce heat and dampness, and promote appetite.

=== Food tradition in East Africa ===
In Kenya, the bean, known as njahe or njahi, is popular among several communities, especially the Kikuyu. Seasons were actually based on it, i.e., the Season of Njahe (Kīmera kīa njahī). It is thought to encourage lactation and has historically been the main dish for breastfeeding mothers. Beans are boiled and mashed with ripe and/or semi-ripe bananas, giving the dish a sweet taste. Today the production is in decline in eastern Africa. This is partly attributed to the fact that under colonial rule in Kenya, farmers were forced to give up their local bean in order to produce common beans (Phaseolus vulgaris) for export.

=== Medicinal use ===
Taiwanese researchers found that a carbohydrate-binding protein (i.e. a legume lectin) from lablab beans effectively blocks the infections of influenza viruses and SARS-CoV-2. Researchers from Finland and USA found that extracts from chewing gum manufactured from lablab bean seeds had broad-spectrum anti-viral properties, likely due to the binding action of Flt3 Receptor Interacting Lectin (FRIL) on viruses; the anti-viral effect was similar to that of purified FRIL.

In Colombia, Curaçao, and the Bahamas, the hyacinth bean was used in traditional medicine as a decoction of the young seeds, an infusion of the leaves, and crushed leaves.

== Gallery ==
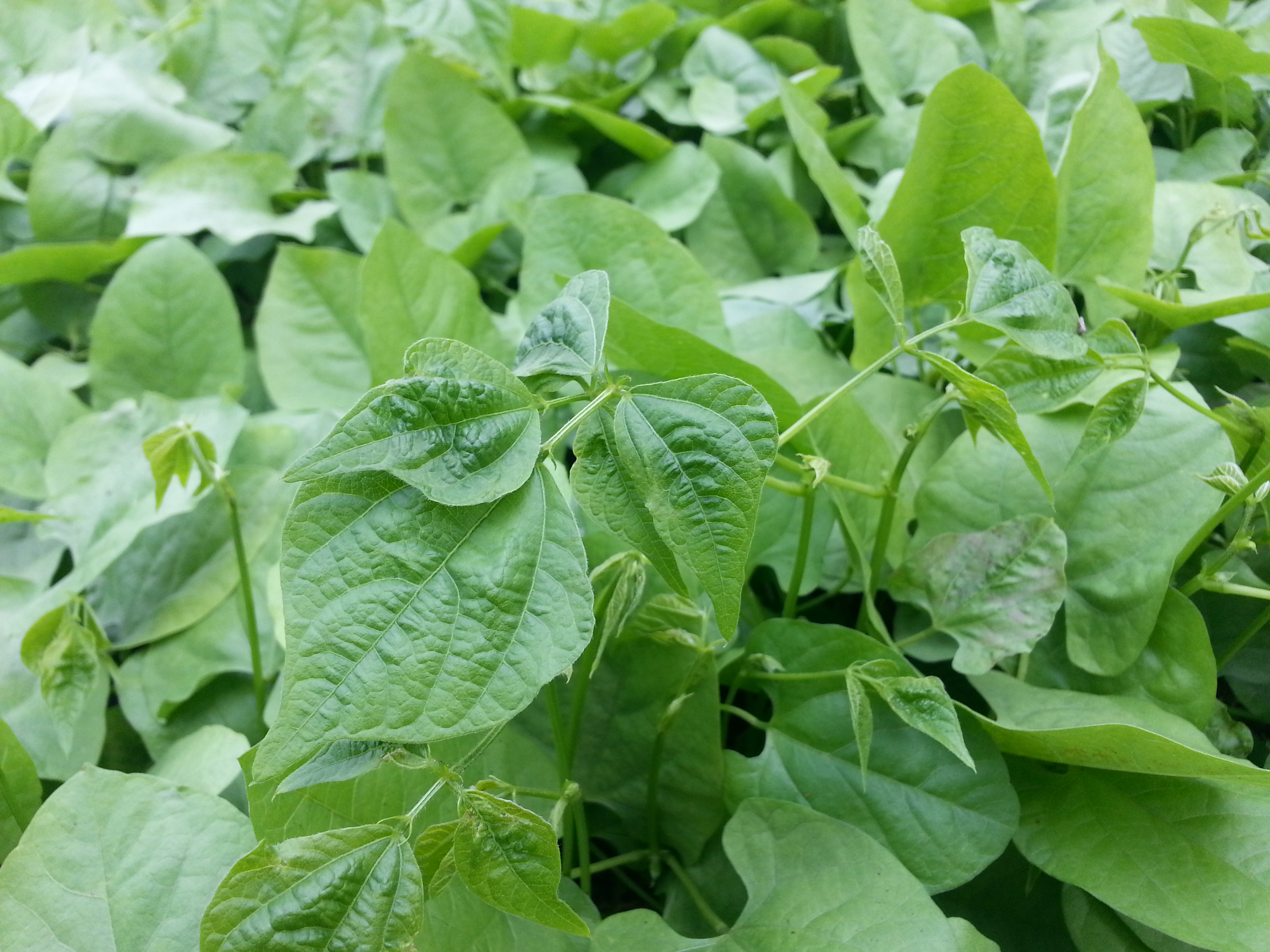
Foliage

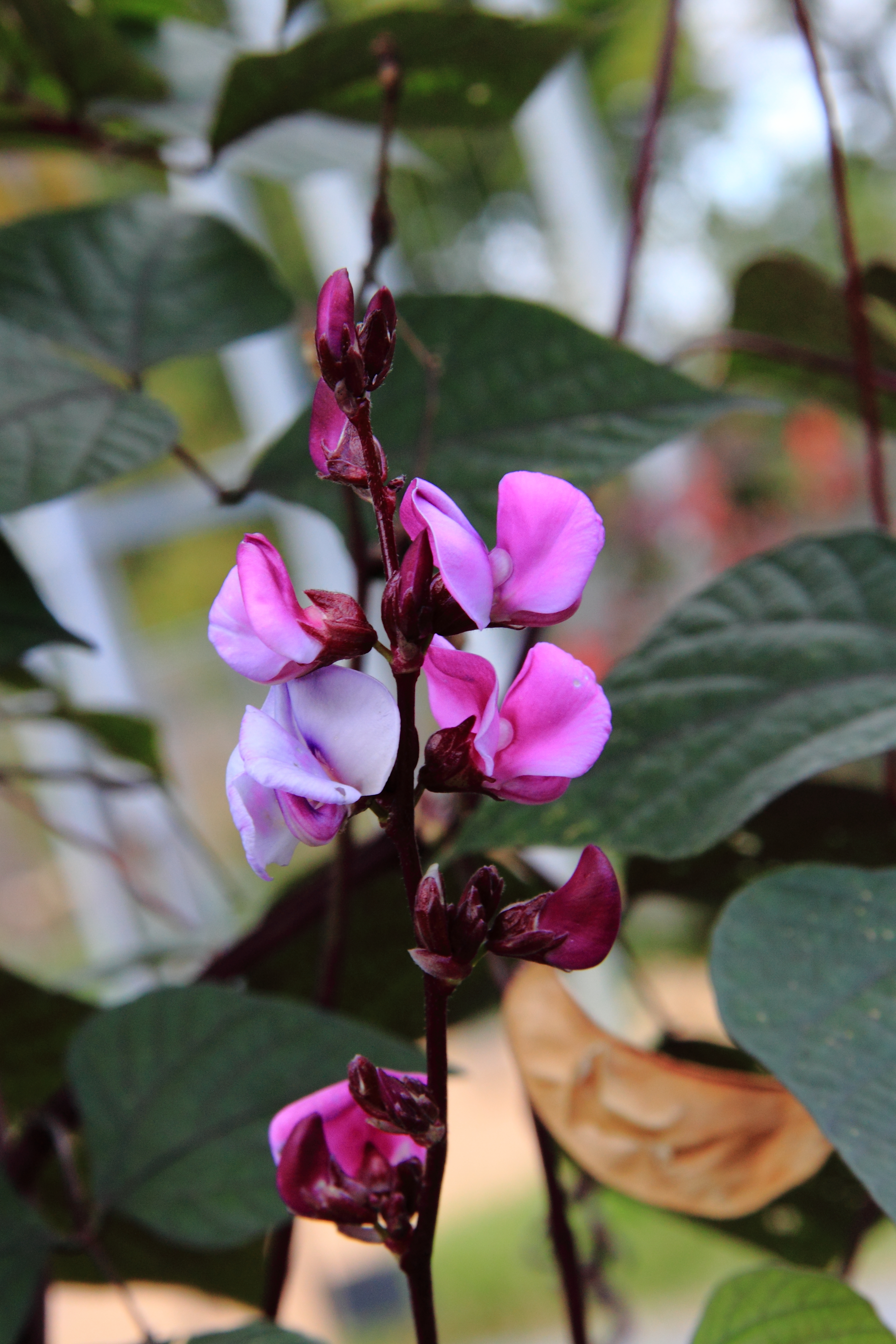
Flowers

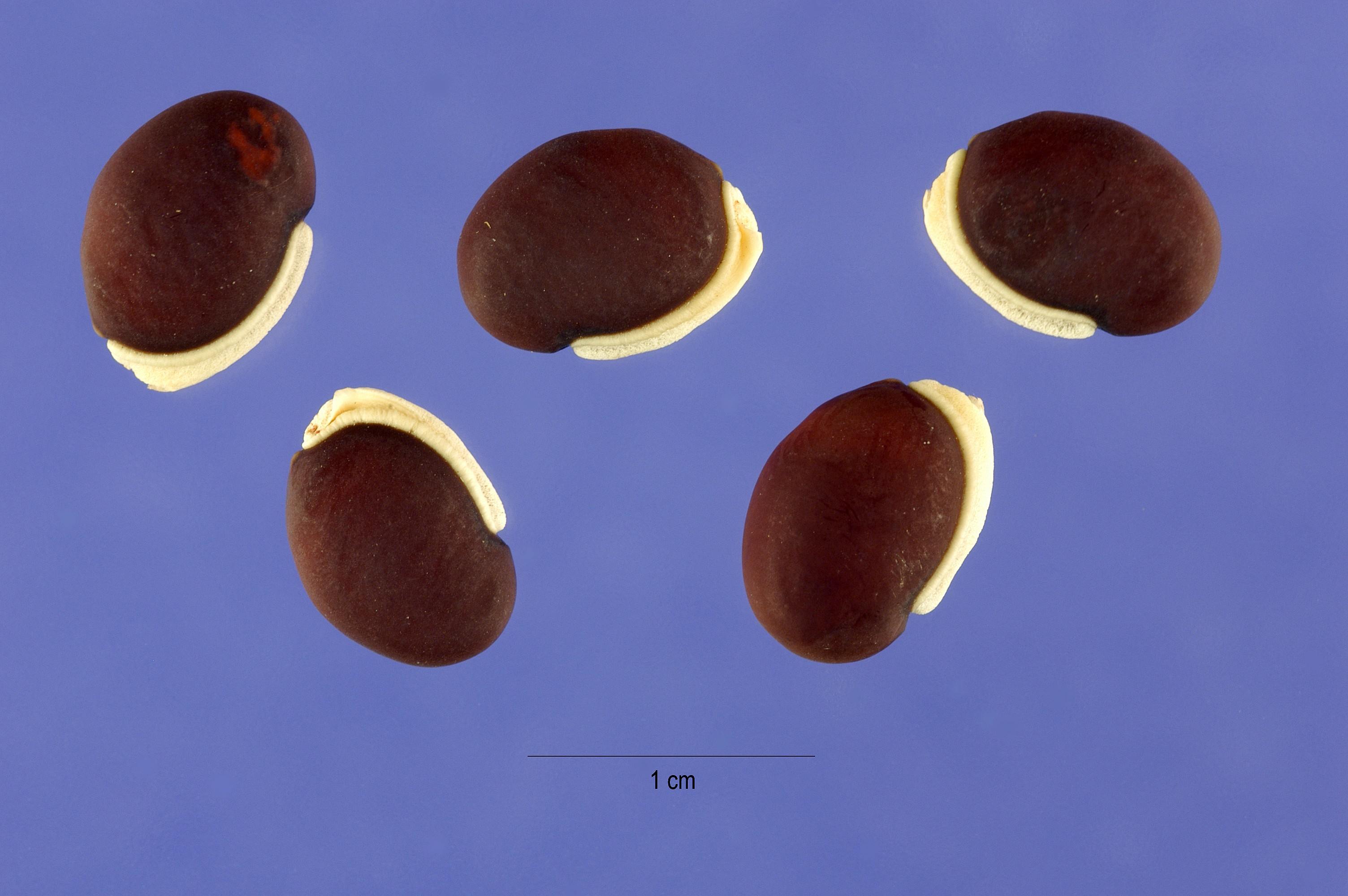
Seeds

== Sources ==
- Maundu, Patrick M.; Ngugi, Grace W.; Kabuye, Christine H. S. (1999). Traditional Food Plants of Kenya. Kenya Resource Centre for Indigenous Knowledge, National Museums of Kenya. ISBN 978-9966-9861-4-6.
