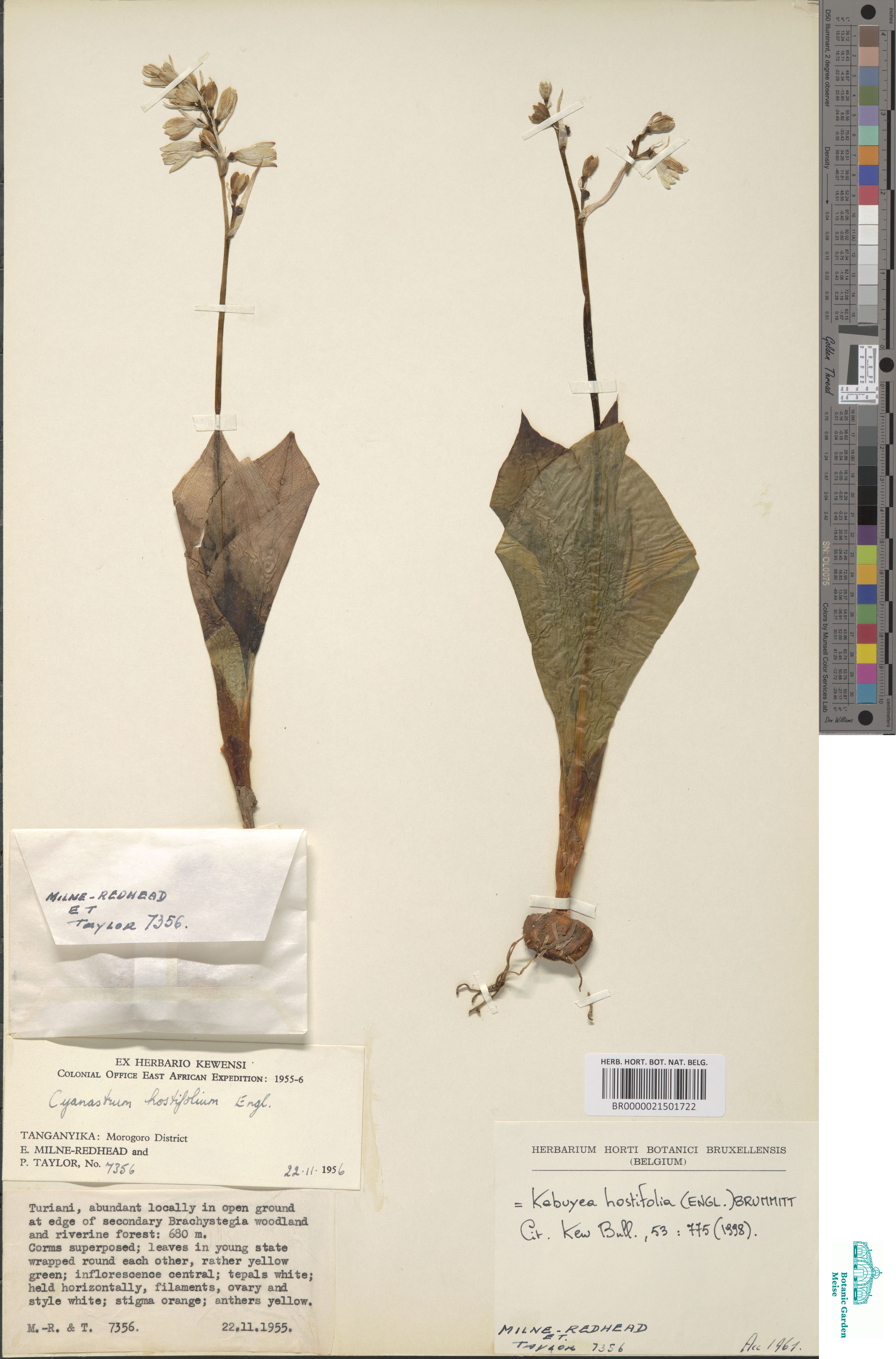

Conservation status
- Least Concern (IUCN 3.1)

Scientific classification
- Kingdom: Plantae
- Clade: Tracheophytes
- Clade: Angiosperms
- Clade: Monocots
- Order: Asparagales
- Family: Tecophilaeaceae
- Genus: Kabuyea; Brummitt
- Species: K. hostifolia

Binomial name
- Kabuyea hostifolia (Engl.) Brummitt

Synonyms
- Cyanastrum hostifolium Engl.; Cyanastrum bussei Engl.

= Kabuyea =

Genus of flowering plants

Kabuyea is a plant genus in the family Tecophilaeaceae, first described as a genus in 1998. It has one known species, Kabuyea hostifolia, native to Tanzania and Mozambique.

== Description ==
Kabuyea hostifolia has a corm that lacks a protective tunic. The leaves are all basal and usually number four, both the leaves and the inflorescence emerging from the same corm-scale, and being present simultaneously. The inflorescence is a raceme, each floret having white tepals and parts in sixes.

The species is named in honor of Ugandan ethnobotanist Christine H. Sophie Kabuye.
