= Millennium Seed Bank Partnership =

Plant conservation programme and organization based in UK

Coordinates: 51.068578°N 0.090209°W

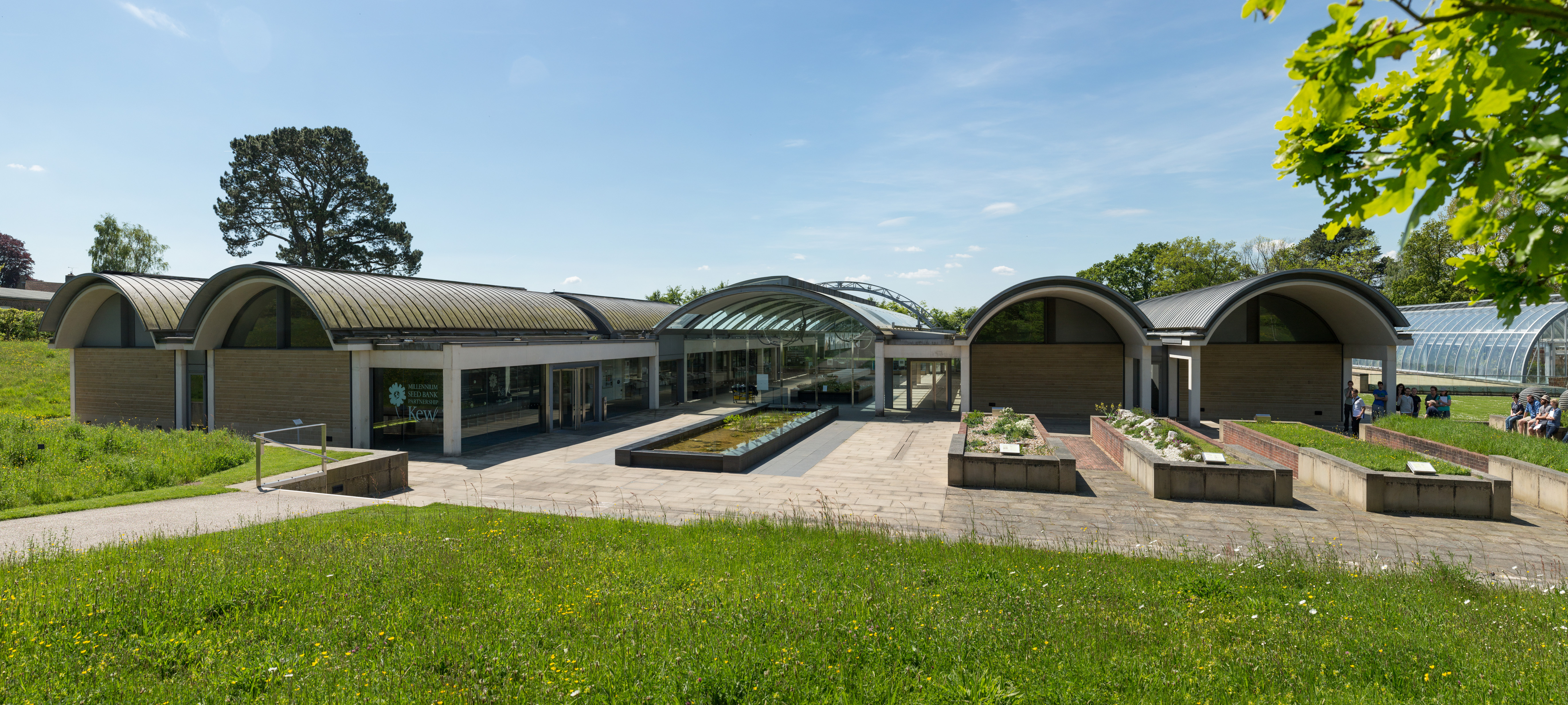
Millennium Seed Bank building

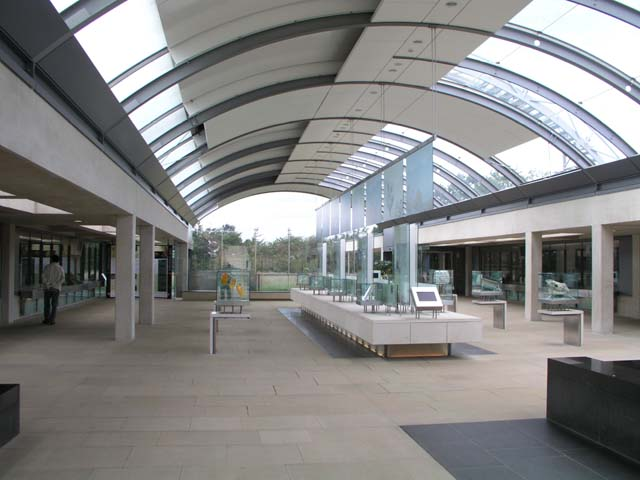
Central visitor hall

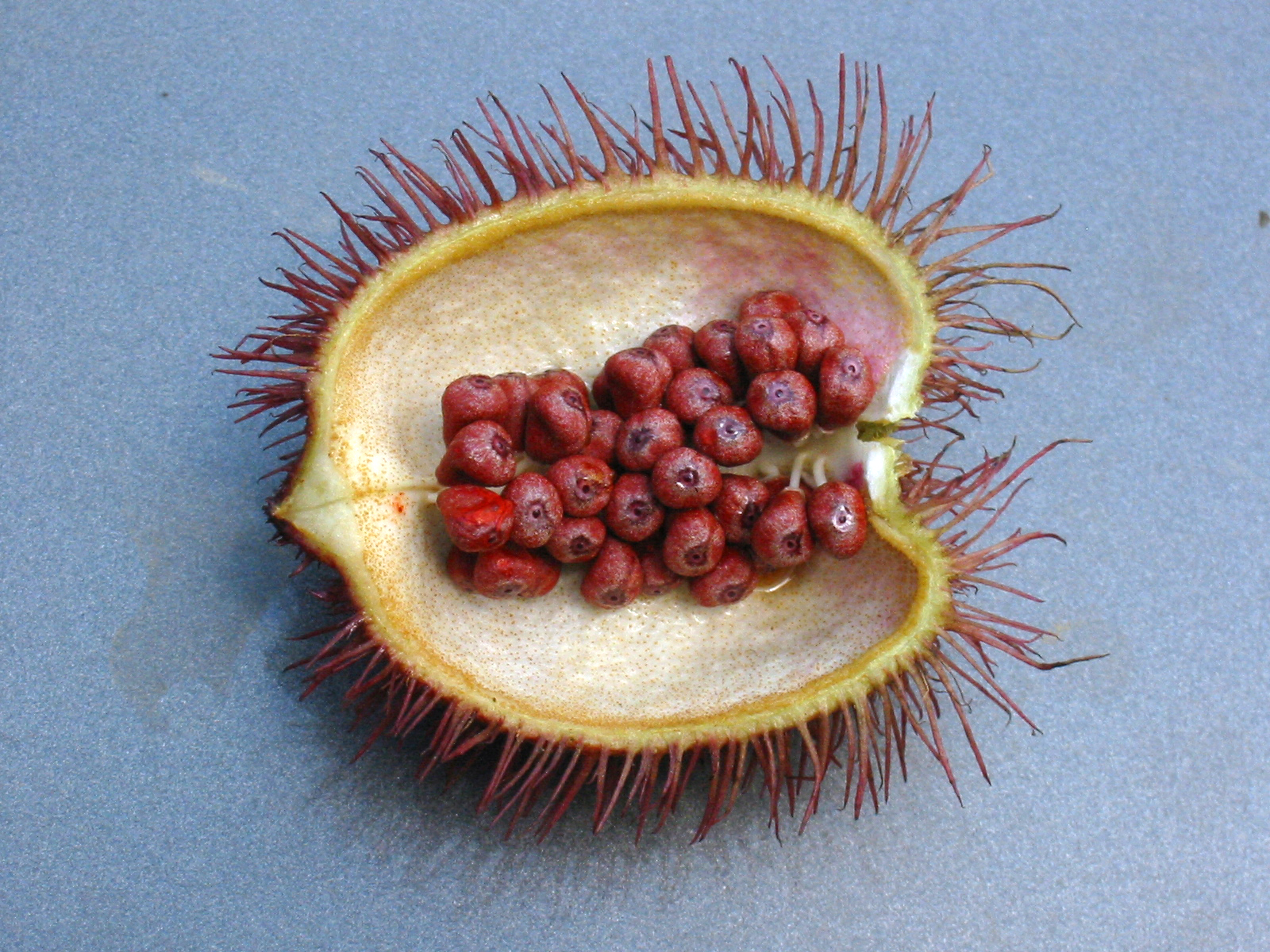
Bixa orellana seeds

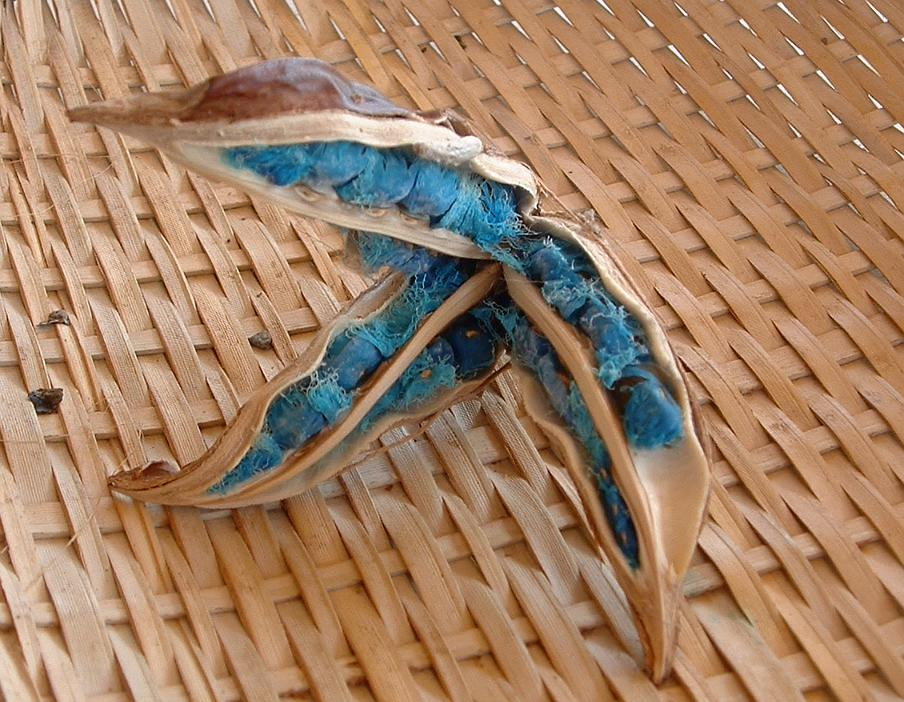
Ravenala madagascariensis seeds

The Millennium Seed Bank Partnership (MSBP or MSB), formerly known as the Millennium Seed Bank Project, is the largest ex situ plant conservation programme in the world, coordinated by the Royal Botanic Gardens, Kew, UK. After being awarded a Millennium Commission grant in 1995, the project commenced in 1996, and is now housed in the Wellcome Trust Millennium Building situated in the grounds of Wakehurst Place, West Sussex. Its purpose is to provide an "insurance policy" against the extinction of plants in the wild by storing seeds for future use. The storage facilities consist of large underground frozen vaults preserving the world's largest wild-plant seedbank or collection of seeds from wild species. The project had been started by Dr Peter Thompson and run by Paul Smith after the departure of Roger Smith. Roger Smith was awarded the OBE in 2000 in the Queen's New Year Honours for services to the Project.

== Project ==
In collaboration with other biodiversity projects around the world, expeditions are sent to collect seeds from dryland plants. Where possible, collections are kept in the country of origin with duplicates being sent to the Millennium Seed Bank Project for storage. Major partnerships exist on all the continents, enabling the countries involved to meet international objectives such as the Global Strategy for Plant Conservation and the Millennium Development Goals of the United Nations Environment Programme.

The seed bank at Kew has gone through many iterations. The Kew Seed Bank facility, set up by Peter Thompson in 1980, preceded the MSBP and was headed by Roger Smith from 1980 to 2005. From 2005, Paul Smith took over as head of the MSBP. The Wellcome Trust Millennium Seed Bank building was designed by the firm Stanton Williams and opened by Prince Charles in 2000. The laboratories and offices are in two wings flanking a wide space open to visitors which houses an exhibition. From here visitors can also view the cleaning and preparation of seeds through windows of the work areas and see the entrance to the underground vaults where the seeds are stored at −20 °C (−4 °F). In 2001, the international programme of the MSBP was launched.

In April 2007, it banked its billionth seed, the Oxytenanthera abyssinica, a type of African bamboo. In October 2009, it reached its 10% goal of banking all the world's wild plant species by adding Musa itinerans, a wild banana, to its seed vault. As estimates for the number of seed bearing plant species have increased, 34,088 wild plant species and 1,980,405,036 seeds in storage as of June 2015 represent over 13% of the world's wild plant species.

As of 2025, the Millennium Seed Bank contained just under 2.5 billion seeds, made up of 103,000 collections from over 40,000 species. Over 98% of the UK's bankable plant species are contained within these collections.

== Aims ==
The main aims of the project are to:

- Collect the seeds from 75,000 species of plants by 2020, representing 25% of known flora. This is the second phase of this goal, with the original partnership goal of banking 10% of known flora by 2010 was achieved in October 2009.
- Collect seeds from all of the UK's native flora.
- Further research into conservation and preservation of seeds and plants.
- Act as a focal point for research in this area and encourage public interest and support.

== International partnerships ==
There are over 100 partnerships worldwide, including Australia, Mexico, Chile, Kenya, China, United States, Jordan, Mali, Malawi, Madagascar, Burkina Faso, Botswana, Tanzania, Saudi Arabia, Lebanon and South Africa. Australia is particularly significant as its flora constitutes 15% of the world's total of species, with 22% of them identified as under threat of extinction. Between 2005 and 2009, MSBP coordinated the EU project ENSCONET.

== Preservation of seeds ==
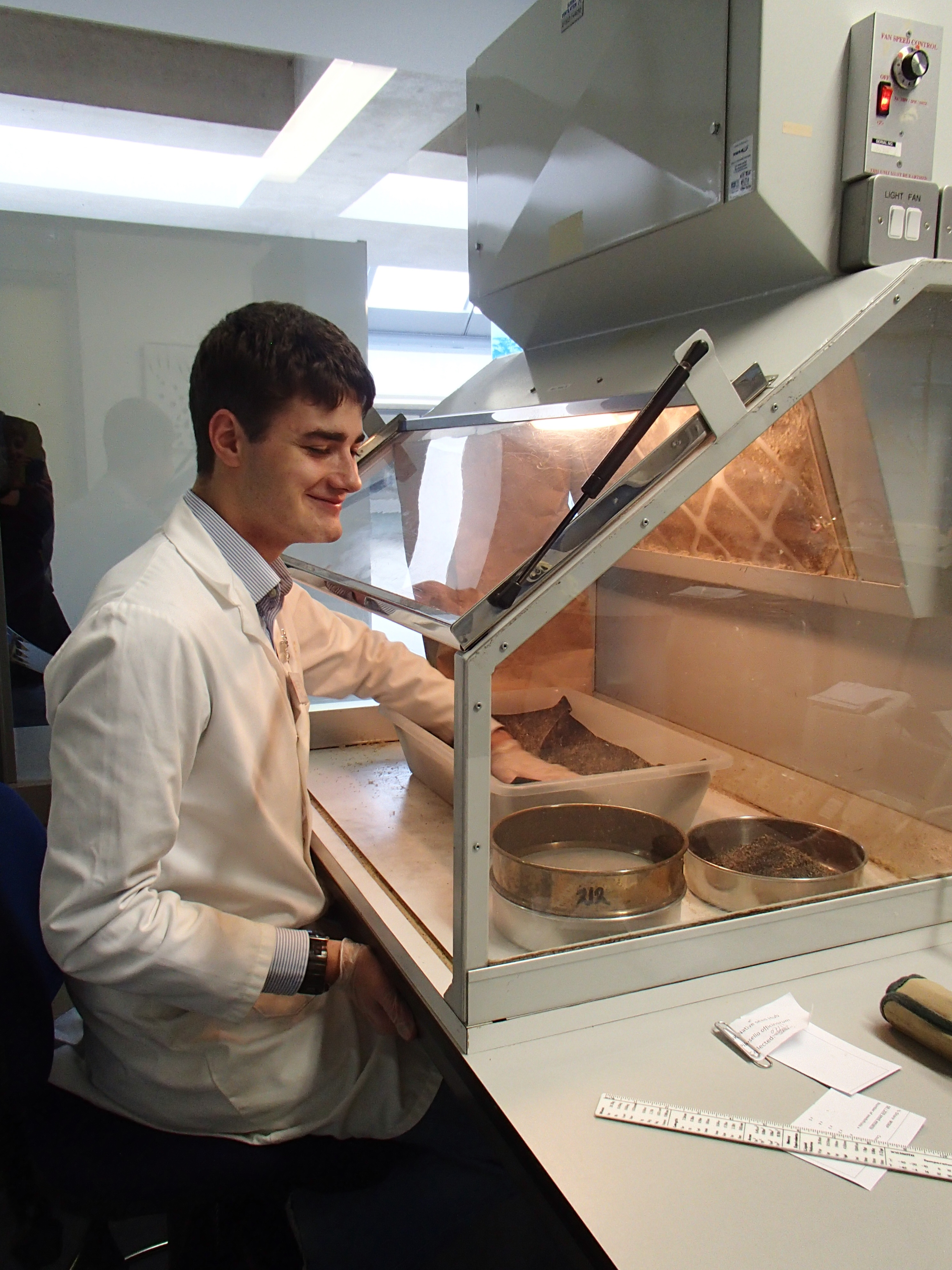
A placement student cleaning Pilosella officinarum seeds under a dust hood at the Millennium Seed Bank

Seed collections arrive at the MSBP in varying states, sometimes attached to fruits, sometimes clean. The collections usually also include a voucher specimen that can be used to identify the plant. The collections are immediately moved to a dry room, where they are stored at 18°C with a 15% relative humidity. Seeds can stay in this room from anywhere between two weeks and six months to extend their lifespan up to 40 times. The seeds are cleaned of debris and other plant material, X-rayed to ensure they are free from pests, then dried a second time before travelling into the vaults where they are banked at −20 °C (−4 °F).

Seeds are banked in hermetically sealed glass containers along with silica gel packets impregnated with indicator compounds that change colour if moisture seeps into the collection. Seeds are tested for viability with a germination test shortly after banking and then at regular 10 year intervals. If seed collections are low, re-harvesting from the wild is the preferred option.

For species that cannot survive the standard drying process, researchers at the Seed Bank are experimenting in using cryopreservation to rapidly dry and freeze seeds (or parts of seeds) using liquid nitrogen.

== Seed distribution ==
When seeds are required for research purposes, they can be requested from the MSBP's seedlist. If it has the legal permission to do so, the MSB can then provide up to 60 seeds for free, to bona fide, non-commercial organisations for the purposes of research, restoration, and reintroduction. All seeds provided to institutions are on a non-profit mutual benefit basis. The MSB also operates the UK Native Seed Hub which aims to improve the resilience of the UK's ecological networks by providing high-quality UK native seeds to conservation and restoration groups.

== See also ==
- Svalbard Global Seed Vault
- Australian Grains Genebank
