= Barış Karabıyık =

Turkish footballer (born 1971)

Barış Karabıyık (born 12 June 1971) is a Turkish former professional association footballer who played as a defender. Throughout his career, he became well known for his performances in the Super League with Kayserispor, as well as with clubs like Diyarbakırspor. After his football career, Karabıyık entered politics and served as a member of the Party Assembly for the Peoples' Democratic Party (HDP).

== Biography ==
=== Early life and education ===
He was born in 1971 in the Yumurtalık district of Adana. He completed his primary and secondary education in his hometown and graduated from Çukurova University with a degree in Computer Technologies and Programming.

=== Football career ===
Karabıyık began his professional football career in the early 1990s. Operating as a defender, he played for various clubs across different Turkish leagues throughout his career. Notable teams in his career include Diyarbakırspor, Kayseri Erciyesspor (under its name at the time), Şanlıurfaspor, and Zonguldakspor.

== Political and social views ==
Barış Karabıyık maintains a critical stance against discrimination based on ethnic identities within the Turkish football environment. Contending that the events he experienced while playing for Diyarbakırspor in the 1990s persist in similar ways today, Karabıyık has stated that sports clubs and athletes face "organized exclusion" due to the cities or names they represent. Evaluating the differing approaches to the use of historical place names (citing the examples of "Sis" and "Amed") as a double standard, the former footballer argues that political rhetoric targets athletes and undermines social peace. Karabıyık attributes his decision to retire from professional football to his reaction against such discriminatory practices and the ethnic-based tensions he witnessed within club environments.
