= Mediterranean Agronomic Institute of Chania =

Educational and research institute

Coordinates: 35.4937°N 24.0485°E

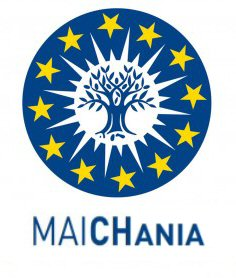
- Type: Intergovernmental organization (Thirteen member States)
- Parent institution: CIHEAM
- Director: Dr George Baourakis
- Location: Chania, Crete, Greece
- Website: www.maich.gr

The Mediterranean Agronomic Institute of Chania (MAICh) is an educational and research institute focusing on Mediterranean agriculture. It is located in Chania (Crete, Greece) and belongs to the four agronomic institutes of the International Centre for Advanced Mediterranean Agronomic Studies (CIHEAM). The institute contains five departments:
- The department of Business Economics & Management
- The department of Geo-information in Environmental Management
- The department of Horticultural Genetics & Biotechnology
- The department of Food Quality & Chemistry of Natural Products
- The department of Sustainable Agriculture.
