= Gábor (given name) =

- Gender: masculine
- Language: Hungarian
- Name day: March 24

Other gender
- Feminine: Gabriella, Ella

Origin
- Language: Hebrew
- Meaning: Man of God, Champion of God

Other names
- Variant forms: Gabos, Gábriel
- Nickname: Gabi
- Cognate: Gabriel
- Anglicisation: Gabriel

Gábor (sometimes written Gabor; Hungarian: [ˈɡaːbor]) is a Hungarian male given name. Its equivalent in English is Gabriel. Gábor originated from the Hebrew name Gabriel and was transmitted to the Hungarian language through the Latin form Gabirianus ~ Gabriel. In medieval writings, shortened forms such as Gab and the derived Gabus also appear. The Hungarian variation was formed by consonant cluster reduction and the shortening of the Latin version. The meaning of the original Hebrew name is 'Man of God' or 'Champion of God'. The name first appeared in Hungarian charters in the first half of the 12th century.

== As a settlement name ==
Each the settlement preserves the memory of the former founder or owner named Gábor:

- Gáborján (Hungary)
- Gáborjánháza (Hungary)
- Géberjén (Hungary)

== Notable persons ==
- Gábor Andreánszky (disambiguation), multiple people
- Gábor Baross (1848–1892), Hungarian politician
- Gábor Báthory (1589–1613), Prince of Transylvania
- Gábor Bethlen (1580–1629), Prince of Transylvania
- Gábor Bódy (1946–1985), Hungarian director
- Gábor Boér (born 1982), Hungarian footballer and manager
- Gabor Boritt (1940–2026), Hungarian-born American historian and author
- Gábor Csupó (born 1952), Hungarian animator
- Gábor Csuzda (born 1989), Hungarian politician
- Gábor Darvas (1911–1985), Hungarian composer and musicologist
- Gábor Döbrentei (1785–1851), Hungarian philologist and antiquary
- Gábor Domokos (born 1961), Hungarian engineer, developer of the Gömböc
- Gábor Ferenczi (born 1977), Hungarian politician
- Gábor Ferenczi (born 1950), Hungarian film director
- Gábor Gyepes (born 1981), Hungarian footballer
- Gábor Harangozó (born 1975), Hungarian politician
- Gabor Herman, researcher in the field of computed tomography
- Gábor Híres (born 1958), Hungarian footballer and manager
- Gábor Horváth (disambiguation), multiple people
- Gábor Hungler (born 1977), Hungarian footballer
- Gábor Kállai (1959–2021), Hungarian chess grandmaster
- Gábor Király (born 1976), Hungarian footballer
- Gábor Koós (born 1986), Hungarian footballer
- Gábor Kuncze (born 1950), Hungarian politician
- Gábor Maté (born 1944), Hungarian-born Canadian physician
- Gábor Nagy (disambiguation), multiple people
- Gábor Papp (born 1987), Hungarian chess grandmaster
- Gábor Pósfai (born 1982), Hungarian politician
- Gábor Rappert–Vencz (born 1967), Romanian actor of Hungarian ethnicity
- Gabor Sarkøzy (also Sárközy Gábor) (1945–2008), Hungarian-Norwegian (pornographic) actor and director
- Gábor A. Somorjai (1935–2025), Hungarian-born American professor of chemistry
- Gábor Szabó (disambiguation), multiple people
- Gábor Szakácsi, Hungarian-born American rock guitarist
- Gábor Szegő (1895–1985), Hungarian mathematician
- Gábor Székelyhidi (born 1981), Hungarian-American mathematician
- Gabor Szilasi (1928–2026), Hungarian-born Canadian photographer
- Gábor Talmácsi (born 1981), Hungarian motorcycle racer
- Gábor Tarkövi (born 1969), Hungarian trumpeter
- Gábor Téglás (1848–1916), Hungarian archaeologist
- Gábor Torma (born 1976), Hungarian footballer
- Gábor Tóth (disambiguation), multiple people
- Gábor Totola (born 1973), Hungarian fencer
- Gábor Vető (born 1988), Hungarian boxer
- Gábor Vona (born 1978), Hungarian politician
- Gábor Wéber (born 1971), Hungarian racing driver

== Sources ==
- Fercsik, Erzsébet; Raátz, Judit (2009). Keresztnevek enciklopédiája (PDF) (in Hungarian). Budapest: Tinta Könyvkiadó. ISBN 978 963 9902 18 3.

== See also ==
- Gabor (surname)
