= Gábor =

Gábor (sometimes written Gabor) may refer to:

- Gábor (given name)
- Gabor (surname)
- Gabor sisters, the three famous actresses, Eva, Magda and Zsa Zsa
- Several scientific terms named after Dennis Gabor
  - Gabor atom
  - Gabor filter, a linear filter used in image processing
  - Gabor transform
  - Gabor Medal, a medal of Royal Society awarded to biologists
- Gabor (2014 film), a Spanish documentary film
- Gabor (2021 film), a Canadian documentary film
