= Dennis Gabor Award (disambiguation) =

The Dennis Gabor Award, named after Hungarian-British electrical engineer and physicist Dennis Gabor, can refer to:

- the Gabor Medal of the Royal Society
- the Dennis Gabor Medal and Prize of the Institute of Physics
- the Dennis Gabor Award in Diffractive Optics of the SPIE
- the International Dennis Gabor Award of the NOVOFER Foundation of the Hungarian Academy of Sciences
