= Tegla =

Tegla may refer to:

- Tegla Loroupe (born 1973), Kenyan long-distance runner
- Edward Tegla Davies (1880–1967), Welsh minister and writer
- Ferenc Tégla (born 1947), Hungarian discus thrower

== See also ==
- Téglás (surname)
