= Adaptive Gabor representation =

Adaptive Gabor representation (AGR) is a Gabor representation of a signal where its variance is adjustable. There's always a trade-off between time resolution and frequency resolution in traditional short-time Fourier transform (STFT). A long window leads to high frequency resolution and low time resolution. On the other hand, high time resolution requires shorter window, with the expense of low frequency resolution. By choosing the proper elementary function for signal with different spectrum structure, adaptive Gabor representation is able to accommodate both narrowband and wideband signal.

== Gabor expansion ==
In 1946, Dennis Gabor suggested that a signal can be represented in two dimensions, with time and frequency coordinates. And the signal can be expanded into a discrete set of Gaussian elementary signals.

=== Definition ===
The Gabor expansion of signal s(t) is defined by this formula:

$$s(t)=\sum_{m=-\infty}^\infty \sum_{n=-\infty}^\infty C_{m,n}h(t-mT)e^{jnt\Omega}$$

where h(t) is the Gaussian elementary function:

$$h(t)=\left( \frac{\alpha}{\pi} \right)^\frac{1}{4}e^{\left( -\frac{\alpha}{2}t^2 \right)}$$

Once the Gabor elementary function is determined, the Gabor coefficients $C_{m,n}$can be obtained by the inner product of s(t) and a dual function $\gamma(t)$

$$C_{m,n}=\int s(t)\gamma^*(t-mT)e^{-jnt\Omega} \, dt.$$

$T$ and $\Omega$ denote the sampling steps of time and frequency and satisfy the criteria

$$T\Omega\leqq2\pi \,$$

==== Relationship between Gabor representation and Gabor transform ====
Gabor transform simply computes the Gabor coefficients $C_{m,n}$ for the signal s(t).

== Adaptive expansion ==
Adaptive signal expansion is defined as

$$s\left( t \right)=\sum_p B_p h_p(t)$$

where the coefficients $B_p$ are obtained by the inner product of the signal s(t) and the elementary function $h_p$

$$B_p =\left \langle s,h_p\right \rangle \,$$

Coeffients $B_p$ represent the similarity between the signal and elementary function.
Adaptive signal decomposition is an iterative operation, aim to find a set of elementary function $\left\{ h_p(t) \right\}$, which is most similar to the signal's time-frequency structure.
First, start with w=0 and $s_0\left( t \right)=s\left( t \right)$. Then find $h_0\left( t \right)$ which has the maximum inner product with signal $s_0\left( t \right)$ and

$$\left| B_p \right|^2 = \max_h \left| \left \langle s_p (t),h_p(t) \right \rangle \right|^2$$

Second, compute the residual:

$$s_1\left(t\right) =s_0\left(t\right)-B_0 h_0\left(t\right),$$

and so on. It will comes out a set of residual ($s_p\left(t\right)$), projection ($B_p=\left \langle s_p(t),h_p(t) \right \rangle$), and elementary function ($h_p\left(t\right)$) for each different p. The energy of the residual will vanish if we keep doing the decomposition.

=== Energy conservation equation ===
If the elementary equation ($h_p\left(t\right)$) is designed to have a unit energy. Then the energy contain in the residual at the pth stage can be determined by the residual at p+1th stage plus ($B_p$). That is,

$$\left \| s_p(t) \right \|^2=\left \| s_{p+1}(t) \right \|^2 + \left| B_p \right|^2,$$
$$\left \| s(t) \right \|^2=\sum_{p=o}^\infty \left| B_p \right|^2,$$

similar to the Parseval's theorem in Fourier analysis.

The selection of elementary function is the main task in adaptive signal decomposition. It is natural to choose a Gaussian-type function to achieve the lower bound for the inequality:

$$h_p(t)=\left( \frac{\alpha}{\pi} \right)^\frac{1}{4}e^{ -\frac{\alpha}{2}(t-T_p)^2}e^{jt\Omega_p},$$

where $\left(T_p,\Omega_p\right)$ is th mean and $\alpha_p^{-1}$ is the variance of Gaussian at $\left(T_p,\Omega_p\right)$. And

$$s\left( t \right) = \sum_p B_p h_p(t) = \sum_p B_p\left( \frac{\alpha}{\pi} \right)^\frac{1}{4} e^{-\frac{\alpha}{2}(t-T_p)^2 }e^{jt\Omega_p}$$

is called the adaptive Gabor representation.

Changing the variance value will change the duration of the elementary function (window size), and the center of the elementary function is no longer fixed. By adjusting the center point and variance of the elementary function, we are able to match the signal's local time-frequency feature. The better performance of the adaptation is achieved at the cost of matching process. The trade-off between different window length now become the trade-off between computation time and performance.

== See also ==
- Gabor transform
- Short-time Fourier transform
