= NOVOFER Foundation =

The NOVOFER Foundation for Technical and Intellectual Creation functions under the auspices of the Hungarian Academy of Sciences, the Ministry of Education, and the Ministry of Informatics and Communications.

Among other activities, it awards the International Dennis Gabor Award for outstanding scientific achievements with practical applications, with the emphasis of international cooperation of the researchers. It is named after the Nobel Prize winner Dennis Gabor. The award includes a 130 mm-diameter pure silver medal with a hologram of Dennis Gabor's portrait, a charter of honour, and a monetary prize.
