= Isoelectric point =

pH at which a molecule carries no net electric charge

The isoelectric point (pI, pH(I), IEP) is the pH at which a molecule carries no net electrical charge or is electrically neutral in the statistical mean. The standard nomenclature to represent the isoelectric point is pH(I). However, pI is also used. For brevity, this article uses pI. The net charge on the molecule is affected by pH of its surrounding environment and can become more positively or negatively charged due to the gain or loss, respectively, of protons (H^{+}).

Surfaces naturally charge to form a double layer. In the common case when the surface charge-determining ions are H^{+}/HO^{−}, the net surface charge is affected by the pH of the liquid in which the solid is submerged.

The pI value can affect the solubility of a molecule at a given pH. Such molecules have minimum solubility in water or salt solutions at the pH that corresponds to their pI and often precipitate out of solution. Biological amphoteric molecules such as proteins contain both acidic and basic functional groups. Amino acids that make up proteins may be positive, negative, neutral, or polar in nature, and together give a protein its overall charge. At a pH below their pI, proteins carry a net positive charge; above their pI they carry a net negative charge. Proteins can, thus, be separated by net charge in a polyacrylamide gel using either preparative native PAGE, which uses a constant pH to separate proteins, or isoelectric focusing, which uses a pH gradient to separate proteins. Isoelectric focusing is the first step in 2-D polyacrylamide gel electrophoresis.

In biomolecules, proteins can be separated by ion exchange chromatography. Biological proteins are made up of zwitterionic amino acid compounds; the net charge of these proteins can be positive or negative depending on the pH of the environment. The specific pI of the target protein can be used to model the process around and the compound can then be purified from the rest of the mixture. Buffers of various pH can be used for this purification process to change the pH of the environment. When a mixture containing a target protein is loaded into an ion exchanger, the stationary matrix can be either positively-charged (for mobile anions) or negatively-charged (for mobile cations). At low pH values, the net charge of most proteins in the mixture is positive – in cation exchangers, these positively-charged proteins bind to the negatively-charged matrix. At high pH values, the net charge of most proteins is negative, where they bind to the positively-charged matrix in anion exchangers. When the environment is at a pH value equal to the protein's pI, the net charge is zero, and the protein is not bound to any exchanger, and therefore, can be eluted out.

== Calculating pI values ==
For an amino acid with only one amine and one carboxyl group, the pI can be calculated from the mean of the pKas of this molecule.

$$\mathrm{pI} = \frac{\mathrm{p}K_\mathrm{a1} + \mathrm{p}K_\mathrm{a2}}{2}$$

The pH of an electrophoretic gel is determined by the buffer used for that gel. If the pH of the buffer is above the pI of the protein being run, the protein will migrate to the positive pole (negative charge is attracted to a positive pole). If the pH of the buffer is below the pI of the protein being run, the protein will migrate to the negative pole of the gel (positive charge is attracted to the negative pole). If the protein is run with a buffer pH that is equal to the pI, it will not migrate at all. This is also true for individual amino acids.

=== Examples ===
glycine pK = 2.72, 9.60	adenosine monophosphate pK = 0.9, 3.8, 6.1

In the two examples (on the right) the isoelectric point is shown by the green vertical line. In glycine the pK values are separated by nearly 7 units. Thus in the gas phase, the concentration of the neutral species, glycine (GlyH), is effectively 100% of the analytical glycine concentration. Glycine may exist as a zwitterion at the isoelectric point, but the equilibrium constant for the isomerization reaction in solution

$$\ce{H2NCH2CO2H <=> H3N+CH2CO2-}$$

is not known.

The other example, adenosine monophosphate is shown to illustrate the fact that a third species may, in principle, be involved. In fact the concentration of (AMP)H^{2+}_{3} is negligible at the isoelectric point in this case. If the pI is greater than the pH, the molecule will have a positive charge.

== Peptides and proteins ==
A number of algorithms for estimating isoelectric points of peptides and proteins have been developed. Most of them use Henderson–Hasselbalch equation with different pK values. For instance, within the model proposed by Bjellqvist and co-workers, the pKs were determined between closely related immobilines by focusing the same sample in overlapping pH gradients. Some improvements in the methodology (especially in the determination of the pK values for modified amino acids) have been also proposed. More advanced methods take into account the effect of adjacent amino acids ±3 residues away from a charged aspartic or glutamic acid, the effects on free C terminus, as well as they apply a correction term to the corresponding pK values using genetic algorithm. Other recent approaches are based on a support vector machine algorithm and pKa optimization against experimentally known protein/peptide isoelectric points.

Moreover, experimentally measured isoelectric point of proteins were aggregated into the databases. Recently, a database of isoelectric points for all proteins predicted using most of the available methods had been also developed.

In practice, a protein with an excess of basic aminoacids (arginine, lysine and/or histidine) will bear an isoelectric point roughly greater than 7 (basic), while a protein with an excess of acidic aminoacids (aspartic acid and/or glutamic acid) will often have an isoelectric point lower than 7 (acidic). The electrophoretic linear (horizontal) separation of proteins by Ip along a pH gradient in a polyacrylamide gel (also known as isoelectric focusing), followed by a standard molecular weight linear (vertical) separation in a second polyacrylamide gel (SDS-PAGE), constitutes the so-called two-dimensional gel electrophoresis or PAGE 2D. This technique allows a thorough separation of proteins as distinct "spots", with proteins of high molecular weight and low Ip migrating to the upper-left part of the bidimensional gel, while proteins with low molecular weight and high Ip locate to the bottom-right region of the same gel.

== Ceramic materials ==
The isoelectric points (IEP) of metal oxide ceramics are used extensively in material science in various aqueous processing steps (synthesis, modification, etc.). In the absence of chemisorbed or physisorbed species particle surfaces in aqueous suspension are generally assumed to be covered with surface hydroxyl species, M-OH (where M is a metal such as Al, Si, etc.). At pH values above the IEP, the predominant surface species is M-O^{−}, while at pH values below the IEP, M-OH_{2}^{+} species predominate. Some approximate values of common ceramics are listed below:

Material	IEP
WO_{3}	0.2–0.5
Sb_{2}O_{5}	<0.4–1.9
V_{2}O_{5}	1–2 (3)
δ-MnO_{2}	1.5
SiO_{2}	1.7–3.5
SiC	2–3.5
Ta_{2}O_{5}	2.7–3.0
TiO_{2}	2.8–3.8
γ-Fe_{2}O_{3}	3.3–6.7
SnO_{2}	4–5.5 (7.3)
ZrO_{2}	4–11
ITO	6
Cr_{2}O_{3}	6.2–8.1 (7)
Fe_{3}O_{4}	6.5–6.8
CeO_{2}	6.7–8.6
Y_{2}O_{3}	7.15–8.95
γ-Al_{2}O_{3}	7–8
β-MnO_{2}	7.3
Tl_{2}O	8
α-Al_{2}O_{3}	8–9
α-Fe_{2}O_{3}	8.4–8.5
ZnO	8.7–10.3
Si_{3}N_{4}	9
CuO	9.5
La_{2}O_{3}	10
NiO	10–11
PbO	10.7–11.6
MgO	12–13 (9.8·12.7)

Note: The following list gives the isoelectric point at 25 °C for selected materials in water. The exact value can vary widely, depending on material factors such as purity and phase as well as physical parameters such as temperature. Moreover, the precise measurement of isoelectric points can be difficult, thus many sources often cite differing values for isoelectric points of these materials.

Mixed oxides may exhibit isoelectric point values that are intermediate to those of the corresponding pure oxides. For example, a synthetically prepared amorphous aluminosilicate (Al_{2}O_{3}-SiO_{2}) was initially measured as having IEP of 4.5 (the electrokinetic behavior of the surface was dominated by surface Si-OH species, thus explaining the relatively low IEP value). Significantly higher IEP values (pH 6 to 8) have been reported for 3Al_{2}O_{3}-2SiO_{2} by others. Similarly, also IEP of barium titanate, BaTiO_{3} was reported in the range 5–6 while others got a value of 3. Mixtures of titania (TiO_{2}) and zirconia (ZrO_{2}) were studied and found to have an isoelectric point between 5.3–6.9, varying non-linearly with %(ZrO_{2}). The surface charge of the mixed oxides was correlated with acidity. Greater titania content led to increased Lewis acidity, whereas zirconia-rich oxides displayed Brønsted acidity. The different types of acidities produced differences in ion adsorption rates and capacities.

== Versus point of zero charge ==
The terms isoelectric point (IEP) and point of zero charge (PZC) are often used interchangeably, although under certain circumstances, it may be productive to make the distinction.

In systems in which H^{+}/OH^{−} are the interface potential-determining ions, the point of zero charge is given in terms of pH. The pH at which the surface exhibits a neutral net electrical charge is the point of zero charge at the surface. Electrokinetic phenomena generally measure zeta potential, and a zero zeta potential is interpreted as the point of zero net charge at the shear plane. This is termed the isoelectric point. Thus, the isoelectric point is the value of pH at which the colloidal particle remains stationary in an electrical field. The isoelectric point is expected to be somewhat different from the point of zero charge at the particle surface, but this difference is often ignored in practice for so-called pristine surfaces, i.e., surfaces with no specifically adsorbed positive or negative charges. In this context, specific adsorption is understood as adsorption occurring in a Stern layer or chemisorption. Thus, point of zero charge at the surface is taken as equal to isoelectric point in the absence of specific adsorption on that surface.

According to Jolivet, in the absence of positive or negative charges, the surface is best described by the point of zero charge. If positive and negative charges are both present in equal amounts, then this is the isoelectric point. Thus, the PZC refers to the absence of any type of surface charge, while the IEP refers to a state of neutral net surface charge. The difference between the two, therefore, is the quantity of charged sites at the point of net zero charge. Jolivet uses the intrinsic surface equilibrium constants, pK^{−} and pK^{+} to define the two conditions in terms of the relative number of charged sites:

$$\mathrm{p}K^- - \mathrm{p}K^+ = \Delta \mathrm{p}K = \log {\frac{\left[\mathrm{MOH}\right]^2}{\left[\mathrm{MOH}{_2^+}\right]\left[\mathrm{MO}^-\right]}}$$

For large ΔpK (>4 according to Jolivet), the predominant species is MOH while there are relatively few charged species – so the PZC is relevant. For small values of ΔpK, there are many charged species in approximately equal numbers, so one speaks of the IEP.

== See also ==
- Electrophoretic deposition
- Henderson–Hasselbalch equation
- Isoelectric focusing
- Isoionic point
- pK acid dissociation constant
- Zeta potential
