= Kaj Ulrik Linderstrøm-Lang =

Kaj Linderstrøm-Lang
- Born: Kaj Ulrik Linderstrøm-Lang; 29 November 1896; Frederiksberg, Denmark
- Died: 25 May 1959 (aged 62); Copenhagen, Denmark
- Known for: Carlsberg Laboratory
- Awards: ForMemRS (1956)
- Scientific career
- Notable students: Frederic M. Richards

Kaj Ulrik Linderstrøm-Lang (29 November 1896 – 25 May 1959) was a Danish protein scientist, who was the director of the Carlsberg Laboratory from 1939 until his death.

His most notable scientific contributions were the development of sundry physical techniques to study protein structure and function (especially hydrogen–deuterium exchange), and his definitions of protein primary, secondary, tertiary and quaternary structure.

Linderstrøm-Lang devoted himself to protein science and trained a generation of eminent protein scientists. He maintained a fun atmosphere in his laboratory with Christmas parties and trips to the Tivoli amusement park in Copenhagen. Linderstrøm-Lang was also a writer, musician and story-teller, and active in the resistance movement against the Nazi occupation of Denmark.

== Research and career ==
=== Early work ===
Linderstrøm-Lang began as a physicist. Only a year after the publication of the Debye–Hückel theory, Linderstrøm-Lang applied it to proteins and contributed in defining the term isoionic point. In particular, he formally considered the ensemble of protonation states. Linderstrøm-Lang began in the Carlsberg laboratory under its second director S. P. L. Sørensen (who invented the pH scale). 1949 volumetric studies showing that the interior of proteins has very few charges and, hence, is likely to be hydrophobic.

=== Innovative methods ===
Perhaps the most elegant method developed by Linderstrøm-Lang is the Cartesian diver for measuring density. A long tube containing oils of gradually increasing density was prepared. A droplet containing a protein mixture is introduced and falls until it reaches its density. Very small changes in the density of the droplet (e.g., those due to an ongoing enzymatic reaction) could be observed by movements of the droplet in the density gradient.

=== Hydrogen-deuterium exchange ===
Kaj Ulrik Linderstrøm-Lang is considered the father of hydrogen–deuterium exchange for protein analysis.

=== Contributions to protein structure and stability ===
Linderstrøm-Lang is justly famous for his organization of protein structure into four levels: primary, secondary, tertiary and quaternary structure. He did so in his Lane Medical Lectures, which were delivered at Stanford University on 2, 4, 8, 10 and 12 October 1951, and later published by Stanford University Press.

=== Contributions to other scientists ===
Linderstrøm-Lang contributed to the training of a whole generation of protein scientists, such as Frederic M. Richards, H. A. Scheraga, Christian B. Anfinsen, William F. Harrington, etc. He is also credited with the insight that the free energy of hydrophobic interactions does not depend only on energy (but also entropy), from his realization that mixing water and alcohol (which contains a hydrophobic methyl group) gives off heat.

== Awards and honors ==
Linderstrøm-Lang was elected an International Member of the United States National Academy of Sciences in 1947, an International Honorary Member of the American Academy of Arts and Sciences in 1950, an International Member of the American Philosophical Society in 1951, and a Foreign Member of the Royal Society (ForMemRS) in 1956.
