= Gabor (surname) =

Gabor or Gábor is a Hungarian surname.

People so named include:

- B. B. Gabor, stage name of Gabor Hegedus (1948–1990), Hungary-born Canadian pop singer
- Bethlen Gábor, Hungarian spelling of Gabriel Bethlen (1580–1629), King of Hungary, Prince of Transylvania and a leader of an anti-Habsburg insurrection in Royal Hungary
- Bill Gabor (1922–2019), American basketball player
- Dennis Gabor (1900–1979), Hungarian-born British physicist and electrical engineer, Nobel Prize winner for inventing holography
- Eva Gabor (1919–1995), Hungarian-born American actress, sister of Magda and Zsa Zsa
- Jolie Gabor (1896–1997), Hungarian-American entrepreneur, jeweler and memoirist, mother of Eva, Magda and Zsa Zsa Gabor
- Magda Gabor (1915–1997), Hungarian entertainer, sister of Eva and Zsa Zsa
- Sasha Gabor (or Sárközy Gábor) (1945–2008), Hungarian-Norwegian (porn) actor and director
- Tamás Gábor (1932–2007), Hungarian Olympic champion épée fencer
- Viki Gabor (born 2007), Polish singer and winner of the 2019 Junior Eurovision Song Contest.
- Zsa Zsa Gabor (1917–2016), Hungarian-American actress, sister of Eva and Magda
