= Gábor Rappert–Vencz =

Romanian actor, freelance performer, musician and presenter

- Born: July 7, 1967 (age 59); Timișoara, Socialist Republic of Romania
- Education: István Szentgyörgyi Institute of Theatre Arts, Târgu Mureș
- Years active: 1990–present
- Employer(s): North Theatre, Satu Mare
- Spouse: Stella Rappert-Vencz
- Children: 1

Gábor Rappert–Vencz (born July 7, 1967) is a Romanian actor, freelance performer, musician, and presenter of Hungarian ethnicity.

== Early life and career ==
He was born in 1967 in Timișoara into a theatrical family of Hungarian ethnicity. His father was a noted actor from Timișoara, Károly Rappert. He completed his elementary and high school education in his hometown. After finishing high school, he studied acting at the István Szentgyörgyi Institute of Theatre Arts in Târgu Mureș. He graduated as an actor in 1990 and immediately joined the Hungarian section of the North Theatre of Satu Mare, where he remained a member until October 2011 (as one of the leading actors of the company). He was a member of the company's artistic council and the Proscenium Foundation. In 2006, he was awarded the György Kovács Prize for his artistic work.

In addition to his acting career, he also worked as a media personality and presenter. For years, he was a presenter on the Hungarian radio station in Satu Mare, City Rádió, and also hosted programs on Romanian Television's Hungarian broadcasts. In October 2011, shortly after the resignation of Csongor Zsolt Nagy, he followed suit, but emphasized that unlike his colleague, he was willing to fulfill the roles already assigned to him in the ongoing productions. During the aftermath of their resignations, a "declaration war" ensued, with many local politicians, patrons, and viewers coming to their defense, while sharp criticisms were also made. The artistic leadership of the Northern Theater of Satu Mare refuted the accusations formulated by them at a press conference, and several of their colleagues from Satu Mare (Ágnes Lőrincz, István Bessenyei, István István, and Zsuzsa Némethy) criticized their decision in an open letter and asked them to reconsider their position. The controversy was put to an end by a joint press release written by the majority of the members of the North Theater of Satu Mare, expressing both their regret for the decisions of their former colleagues (assuring them that they were ready to take them back if they were to reconsider) and their intention to continue envisioning the future under the leadership of Attila Keresztes. Since 2012, Rappert has been working as a freelance actor and performer, commercial and voice-over actor, and television presenter, collaborating with the Romanian section of the North Theater of Satu Mare and various cultural associations.

== Roles ==
=== Major roles at the North Theater of Satu Mare ===
- Billy Flynn (Bob Fosse – Fred Ebb – John Harold Kander: Chicago, directed by Attila Keresztes)
- Kaa (Péter Geszti – Pál Békés – László Dés: The Jungle Book, directed by Regina Szilágyi)
- Prince Conti (David Hirson: La Bête, directed by Géza Bodolay)
- Mar-Szúr Prince, Bögöl Prince (Andor Szilágyi: Leander and Lenszirom, directed by Attila Keresztes)
- Polonius (Csaba Kiss: Return to Denmark, directed by István Albu)
- Vershinin, Alexander Ignatyevich, Lieutenant Colonel, Battery Commander (Anton Chekhov: Three Sisters, directed by Attila Keresztes)
- Harsányi Dénes Junior, Lawyer (István Tasnádi: Pork Preserve, directed by Csaba Tasnádi)
- Chiriac (Ion Luca Caragiale: A Stormy Night, directed by Árpád Árkosi)
- Kerekes Ferkó (Imre Kálmán: Countess Maritza, directed by Attila Keresztes)
- Zürcsev (György Aldobolyi-Nagy – József Romhányi: Mad Sunday, directed by György Aldobolyi-Nagy)
- Paja (Miklós Munkácsy: The Beatles to the End, directed by Csongor Csurulya)
- Master Builder Solness (Henrik Ibsen: Légvár, directed by Csongor Csurulya)
- Migraine (Michel André – Szabolcs Fényes – Iván Szenes: Lulu, directed by József Czintos)
- Almády (Ferenc Molnár: Play in the Castle, directed by Miklós Parászka)
- Kálmán Boér (Géza Csáth: Janika, directed by László Bérczes)
- Jóska Buga (Sándor Rideg – Péter Timár: The Bailiff Is Leaving, directed by Árpád Árkosi)
- Filiberto (Carlo Goldoni: A Strange Story, directed by Csongor Csurulya)
- Stentorian Voice, Captain Latzi, Othello, Firefighter (József Gaál: The Notary of Peleske, directed by András Schlanger)
- Antonio, Venetian Merchant (Shakespeare: The Merchant of Venice, directed by Miklós Parászka)
- Gabi, Agitator (János Háy: The Senák, directed by Zoltán Lendvai)
- Frantisek (Tibor Déry: Imagined Report on an American Pop Festival, directed by László Horányi)
- Alberto Saporito (Eduardo de Filippo: Internal Voices, directed by Alexandre Colpacci)
- John Proctor (Witch Hunt, based on The Crucible by Arthur Miller, directed by Péter Uray)
- Félix Hübner (Dezső Szomory: Györgyike, Dear Child, directed by Zoltán Lendvai)
- Jean, Butler (Mihály Szüle – László Walter – Imre Harmath: One Fool Makes a Hundred, directed by Miklós Parászka)
- II. Soldier (Yevgeny Grishkovets: Winter, directed by László Béres)
- Harry, the Prince of Wales (Falstaff, based on Shakespeare's Henry IV, directed by László Béres)
- Tartuffe (Molière: Tartuffe, directed by István Kövesdy)
- Turnip (Zoltán Egressy: Portuguese, directed by Zoltán Lendvai)
- Dr. Árva Kiss Endre (Zsigmond Móricz: Ear of Wheat, directed by Miklós Parászka)
- Lopakhin (Chekhov: The Cherry Orchard, directed by Árpád Árkosi)
- Révész, Barabás (Gábor Presser – Dusán Sztevanovity – Imre Horváth: The Attic, directed by László Horányi)
- Aljosa (Chekhov – Csaba Kiss: But What Happened to the Woman?, directed by Valentin Venczel)
- Tomao Nicomaco (K. Vajda: Ancona Lovers, directed by Andrei Mihalache)
- Scapin (Molière: Scapin the Schemer, directed by Gavril Pinte)
- Mercutio (Shakespeare: Romeo and Juliet, directed by Miklós Parászka)
- II. Joseph (Peter Shaffer: Amadeus, directed by István Kövesdy)
- Soap (Part I) (Zoltán Egressy: Nettle, French Fries, directed by Páll Miklós Tóth)
- Csató (Ferenc Molnár: Doctor, Sir, Miklós Parászka, Csíki Játékszín)
- Richárd (Mór Jókai: The Son of the Stone-Hearted Man, directed by Miklós Parászka, Csíki Játékszín)
- Count Pixi (Béla Szirmai – Lajos Bakonyi – Károly Békeffi – Lajos Kaszó: Count Miska, directed by Miklós Parászka, Csíki Játékszín)
- Fool (Shakespeare: King Lear, directed by Miklós Parászka)
- Wurm (Schiller: Intrigue and Love, directed by István Kövesdy)
- Kálmán (Áron Tamási: Illusory Rainbow, directed by Miklós Parászka)
- Aston (Harold Pinter: The Caretaker)
- Dorozsmay (Béla Zerkovitz – László Szilágyi: The Kissy Woman, directed by Miklós Parászka, István Bessenyei)
- Master (Sławomir Mrożek: Striptease)
- Ben (Harold Pinter: The Dumb Waiter)
- Lucien Ouvrier (Mihály Eisemann: Black Peter, directed by István Koncz)
- Boy (György Spiró: Chicken Head, directed by István Kövesdy)

== Solo Shows, Concerts ==
- Starry Wind (concert series from the children's poems of András Ferenc Kovács) – with Csongor Zsolt Nagy, Attila Zsolt Péter, and Csaba Cserey.
- The Beatles to the End (concert series from the songs of the performance of the same name) – with Csongor Zsolt Nagy, István István, and Attila Zsolt Péter.
- Cseh Tamás Evening with Gábor Rappert – solo performance.

== Awards ==
- 1993 – György Harag Memorial Plaque
- 2000 – György Harag Memorial Plaque
- 2001 – György Harag Memorial Plaque
- 2001 – István Nádai Memorial Plaque
- 2006 – EMKE György Kovács Prize

== Sources ==
- Rappert Gábor on the website of the Harag György Troupe
- Rappert Gábor in the database of Hamlet.ro
