= Gábor Tóth =

Gábor Tóth may refer to:

- Gábor Tóth (footballer) (born 1987), Hungarian footballer
- Gábor Tóth (politician) (born 1953), Hungarian politician
- Gábor Tóth (wrestler) (born 1964), Hungarian wrestler
