= Dennis Gabor University =

University in Hungary

Coordinates: 47.46520°N 19.03710°E

- Gábor Dénes Egyetem
- Former name: Dennis Gabor College
- Type: Private university
- Established: 1992; 34 years ago
- President: Dr. Ferenc Dietz
- Rector: Dr. Krisztina Zimányi
- Location: Budapest, Hungary
- Website: gde.hu/lang/en

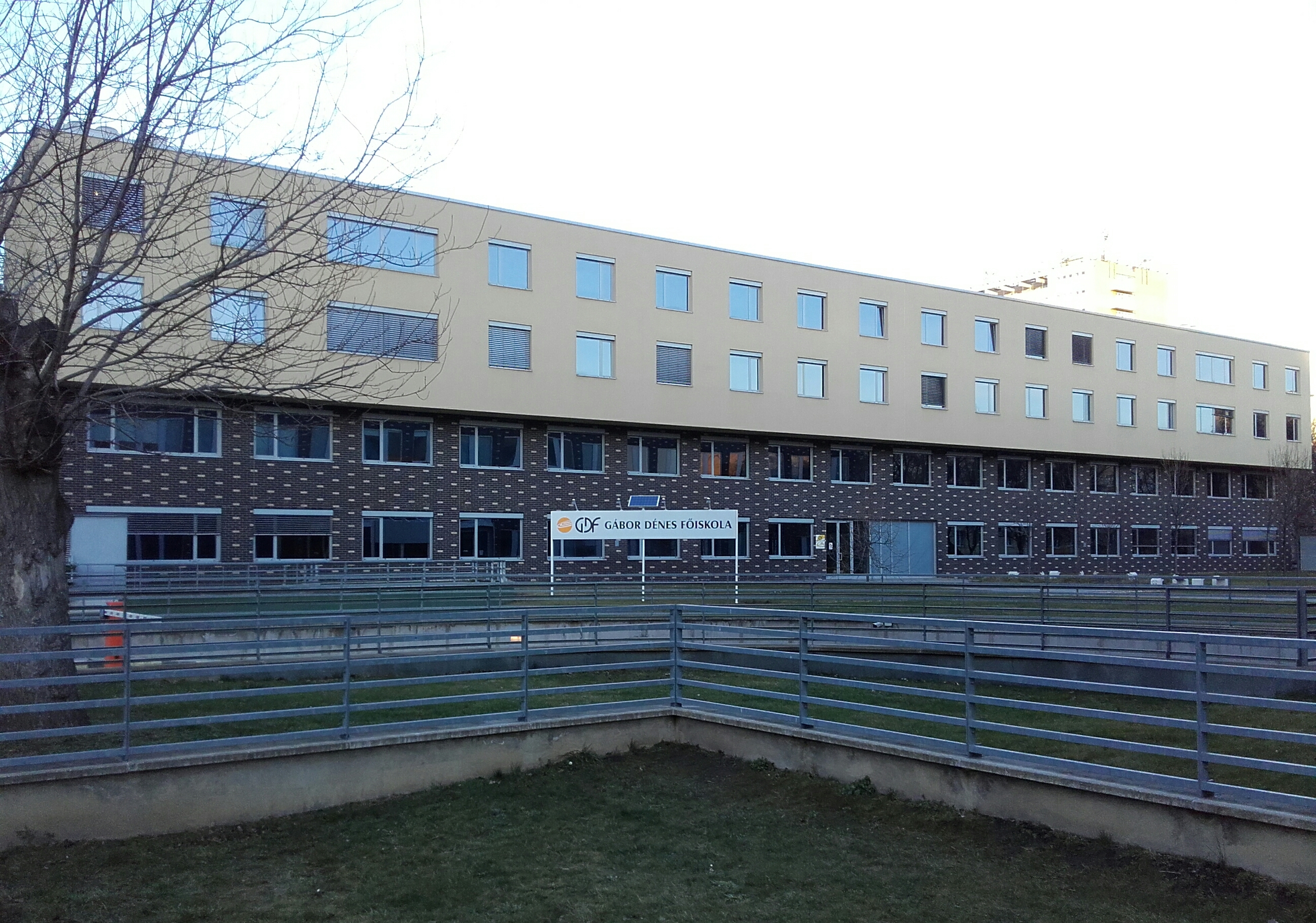
The university's building in 2018, with before becoming a university, with the college logo

Dennis Gabor University (DGU) (Hungarian: Gábor Dénes Egyetem, GDE) is a private educational institution in Budapest, Hungary. It was established in 1992 as a college, and named after the Hungarian physicist Dennis Gabor (Hungarian: Gábor Dénes). It attained the rank of university in 2023. Since its foundation the University has been operating programs that teach IT-themed courses. Currently the school offers three different BSc courses, five post-secondary vocational training courses and four postgraduate courses to Hungarian applicants. Since 1992 more than 15,000 students have graduated at Dennis Gabor University.

Dennis Gabor University was among the first few higher education institutions which introduced distance education, and certain e-learning methods. Both of the College's education courses (full-time and distance) are supported with online study content.
