= Gábor Szabó (disambiguation) =

Gábor Szabó (1936–1982) was a Hungarian jazz guitarist.

Gábor Szabó may also refer to:

- Gabor Szabo (cinematographer) (born 1950), Hungarian cinematographer
- Gábor Szabó (judoka) (born 1967), Australian judoka
- Gábor Lisznyai Szabó (1913–1981), Hungarian composer
- Gábor Mádi Szabó (1922–2003), Hungarian actor
- Gábor P. Szabó (1902–1950), Hungarian footballer
- Gábor Szabó (canoeist), Hungarian sprint canoer
