= Isoionic point =

Term used in protein sciences

The isoionic point is the pH value at which a zwitterion molecule has an equal number of positive and negative charges and no adherent ionic species. It was first defined by S.P.L. Sørensen, Kaj Ulrik Linderstrøm-Lang and Ellen Lund in 1926 and is mainly a term used in protein sciences.

It is different from the isoelectric point (pI) in that pI is the pH value at which the net charge of the molecule, including bound ions is zero. Whereas the isoionic point is at net charge zero in a deionized solution. Thus, the isoelectric and isoionic points are equal when the concentration of charged species is zero.

For a diprotic acid, the hydrogen ion concentration can be found at the isoionic point using the following equation

$$[H^+]=\sqrt{{K_1 K_2 C + K_1 K_w} \over {K_1 + C}}$$

- $[H^+]$ = hydrogen ion concentration
- $K_1$ = first acid dissociation constant
- $K_2$ = second acid dissociation constant
- $K_w$ = dissociation constant for water
- $C$ = concentration of the acid

Note that if $K_1 K_2 C \gg K_1 K_w$ then $K_1 K_2 C + K_1 K_w \approx K_1 K_2 C$ and if $C \gg K_1$ then $K_1 + C \approx C$. Therefore, under these conditions, the equation simplifies to

$$[H^+]=\sqrt{{K_1 K_2 C + K_1 K_w} \over {K_1 + C}} \approx \sqrt{{K_1 K_2 C} \over {C}} \approx \sqrt{K_1 K_2}$$

The equation can be further simplified to calculate the pH by taking the negative logarithm of both sides to yield

$$pH = {{pK_1 + pK_2} \over {2}}$$

which shows that under certain conditions, the isoionic and isoelectric point are similar.
