= Téglás (surname) =

Téglás is a Hungarian surname. Notable people with the surname include:

- Gábor Téglás (1848–1916), Hungarian archaeologist
- Zoltán Téglás (born 1969), American singer

== See also ==
- Téglás, town in Hungary
- Ferenc Tégla (born 1947), Hungarian discus thrower
