= List of fellows of the Royal Society elected in 1956 =

Fellows of the Royal Society who were elected in 1956.

== Fellows ==
1. Norman Percy Allen
2. John Baker, Baron Baker
3. Richard Maling Barrer
4. Robert Brown
5. John Alfred Valentine Butler
6. Dennis Gabor
7. Hans Gruneberg
8. Charles Skinner Hallpike
9. John Edward Harris
10. Walter Kurt Hayman
11. Nicholas Kemmer
12. Nicholas Kurti
13. Robert Gwyn Macfarlane
14. Roy Markham
15. John Wesley Mitchell
16. Sir William D.M. Paton
17. Sir Alfred Brian Pippard
18. Helen Porter
19. George Salt
20. Charles William Shoppee
21. Frederick William Shotton
22. Errol White
23. Sir Maurice Wilkes
24. Sir Denys Haigh Wilkinson
25. Arthur Wormall

== Foreign members ==
1. Kaj Ulrik Linderstrøm-Lang
2. Hans Pettersson
3. Robert Burns Woodward
4. Frits Zernike

== Royal Fellow ==
- Queen Elizabeth The Queen Mother
