= Gábor Tóth (politician) =

Hungarian politician

Member of the National Assembly
- In office 18 June 1998 – 5 May 2014

Personal details
- Born: 31 January 1953 (age 73) Jászfényszaru, Hungary
- Party: Fidesz (since 1997)
- Profession: politician

Gábor Tóth (born 31 January 1953) is a Hungarian politician, member of the National Assembly (MP) for Aszód (Pest County Constituency V) between 1998 and 2014. He was elected mayor of Bag in 2006.

== Early life ==
Gábor Tóth pursued his secondary school studies in Jászberény and Szombathely. He qualified as a plumber and central heating technician in 1970. He worked as a mechanic in the Refrigerator Factory in Jászberény. Later he took up the position of chief technician at the Building Construction Company in Budapest, then went on to work in the same position in the Repair Works of the Jászfényszaru Council. In 1985 he qualified as a business manager for catering facilities with hot food kitchens. He started his own business; he opened the Ablánci Mill Restaurant in Acsád and bought Hotel Csisztó in Bag.

He took part in national triathlon competitions between 1966 and 1970 and was placed second and third within his age group.

== Political career ==
In 1997 Tóth was a founder of the Aszód branch of Fidesz, where he was vice president from 1997 to 1999. He ran in the 1998 parliamentary election for the seat of Aszód (Constituency V, Pest County). He came second in the first round, but received more than 58% of the votes in the second round and thus secured a seat in Parliament. He again secured a mandate running as an individual candidate in Aszód in the April 2002 general election. From the middle of May 2002, just as during his previous term as an MP, he was working as a member of the Environment Committee. In the parliamentary election held in 2006, he was elected MP for Aszód for the third time. He was appointed a member of the Defence and Internal Security Committee on 30 May 2006.

He was elected mayor of Bag in the 2006 local elections. He became MP for the fourth time during the 2010 Hungarian parliamentary election and was re-elected mayor in the 2010 local elections. He became a member of the Defence and Internal Security Committee on 14 May 2010.
