= North Theatre (Satu Mare) =

The North Theatre
- Teatrul de Nord
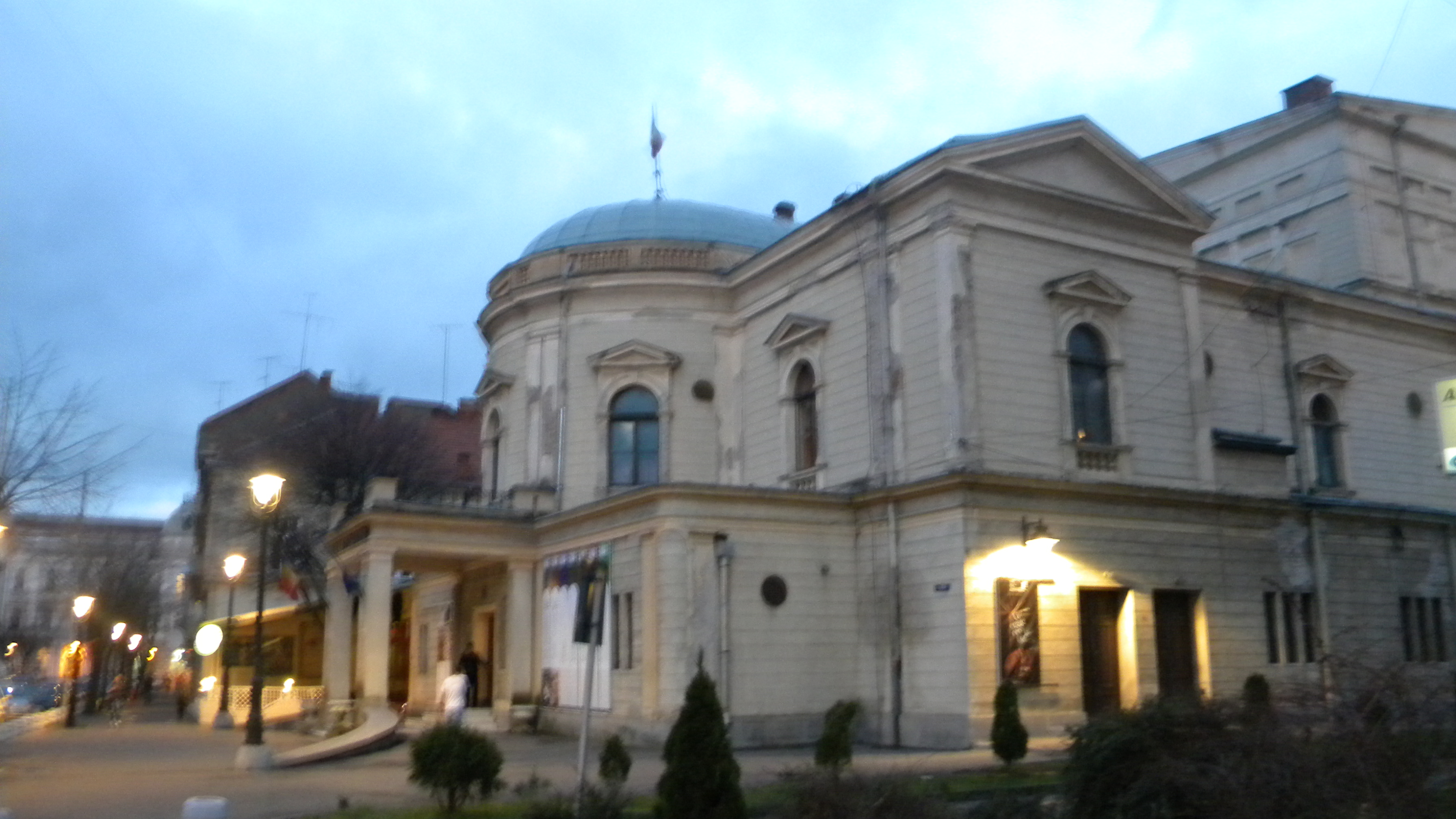
- Side view of the North Theatre, Satu Mare
- Interactive map of the The North Theatre area

General information
- Type: Theatre
- Location: Satu Mare, Romania
- Coordinates: 47°47′39″N 22°52′38″E
- Construction started: 1889
- Owner: Satu Mare City Hall

Technical details
- Floor count: 1

Design and construction
- Architects: Voijta Adolf, Szikszay

The North Theatre (Romanian: Teatrul de Nord) is a theatre in Satu Mare, Romania.

== History ==
The first theatre from Satu Mare was inaugurated on 20 March 1848, but in 1887 it was demolished. The new theatre was built in 1889. In order to keep something from the old theatre in the walls of the building were buried coins, a history of the theatre and a list with the names of the officials from that time.

The first show of the local theatre took place in 1790 under the guidance of Moricz Gyrogy. Between 1814 and 1816 are attested shows performed by troupes from Oradea and Debrecen and in 1918, theatre groups conducted by Bernat Filep.

Until 1848, the shows were performed at the "Green Tree" Tavern (Romanian: Hanul "Arborele Verde"), but also in places like Jena’s House (Romanian: Casa Jenei) built in 1790 and the Kotro Garden (Romanian: Grădina Kotro), where the famous artist Kornélia Prielle started her career.

After 1 December 1918, the theatrical movement from Satu Mare was under the direction of G. M. Zamfirescu, who between 1922 and 1924 organizes shows with amateur actors from the city. In 1932 the theatre group from The Bucharest National Theatre comes to Satu Mare and performs Hamlet by Shakespeare.

After years of Hungarian theatre (since 1956), in 1968 the Romanian theatrical department is being established under the guidance of George Matache. Together, the two departments will form the cultural institution The North Theatre.

== Architecture ==
The North theatre was built in a neoclassical style with one floor. The façade is made up of three parts and the central part is detached in a semicircular profile, with a dome type roof. The entrance is supported by piles. The windows of the façade are arched and framed by decorative triangular gables. The auditorium is decorated with details specific to the era and can hold up to 440 people. The architects of the theatre were Voijta Adolf and Szikszay and the interior designers were Spanraft and Hirsch.
