= Gábor Nagy =

Gábor Nagy may refer to:

- Gábor Tamás Nagy (born 1960), Hungarian jurist and politician
- Gábor Nagy (footballer, born 1981), Hungarian football player for Gyirmót SE
- Gábor Nagy (footballer, born 1985), Hungarian football player for Újpest FC
- Gábor Nagy (chess player) (born 1994), Hungarian chess grandmaster
