= Gábor Horváth =

Gábor Horváth may refer to:

- Gábor Horváth (canoeist, born 1985), Hungarian sprint canoeist, competed since 2006
- Gábor Horváth (canoeist, born 1971), Hungarian sprint canoer, competed from 1993 to 2005 in kayak
- Gábor Horváth (footballer, born 1985), Hungarian football player
- Gábor Horváth (footballer, born 1983), Hungarian football player
- Gábor Horváth (general), Deputy Director General of the European Union Military Staff
