= Gábor Lisznyai Szabó =

Hungarian organist

Gábor Lisznyai-Szabó (Budapest, 8 December 1913 – 22 May 1981) was a Hungarian composer and - although a Catholic - a regular organist at the Dohány Street Synagogue.

== Works, editions and recordings ==
- Missa "Szentkereszt" (Holy Cross mass) 1938
- Missa Et unam sanctam 1942
- Missa simplex 1945
- Requiem 1945
- Oratorio: István királyhoz, King Stephen
- Oratorio: Karácsonyi, Christmas oratorio
- Kantáta Bethlen - Bethlehem cantata
- Magyar istenes énekek - 5 Hungarian religious songs 1975
- organ works
- Ösz for cello and piano

Recording

- Puer natus in Bethlehem
