= International Dennis Gabor Award =

Hungarian scientific award

The International Dennis Gabor Award was established by the NOVOFER Foundation of the Hungarian Academy of Sciences to recognize scientific achievements with practical applications. The award is named after Nobel Prize laureate Dennis Gabor.

The award is presented to Hungarian and international researchers working in applied science and technology. It was first awarded in 1993 and has been conferred periodically, depending on the selection process and availability of candidates.

Each award includes a pure silver medal featuring a hologram portrait of Dennis Gabor, a charter of honor, and a monetary prize. Award ceremonies have been held at the Hungarian Parliament.

After 2010, the NOVOFER Foundation continued to present awards associated with Dennis Gabor’s legacy, including the Dennis Gabor in Memoriam Award and the Dennis Gabor Lifetime Achievement Award.

The Dennis Gabor Award presented annually by SPIE (the International Society for Optics and Photonics) is a separate and unrelated award. It recognizes contributions to diffractive wavefront technologies, including holography and optical metrology.
