= Gabor atom =

In applied mathematics, Gabor atoms, or Gabor functions, are functions used in the analysis proposed by Dennis Gabor in 1946 in which a family of functions is built from translations and modulations of a generating function.

== Overview ==
In 1946, Dennis Gabor suggested the idea of using a granular system to produce sound. In his work, Gabor discussed the problems with Fourier analysis. Although he found the mathematics to be correct, it did not reflect the behaviour of sound in the world, because sounds, such as the sound of a siren, have variable frequencies over time. Another problem was the underlying supposition, as we use sine waves analysis, that the signal under concern has infinite duration even though sounds in real life have limited duration – see time–frequency analysis. Gabor applied ideas from quantum physics to sound, allowing an analogy between sound and quanta. He proposed a mathematical method to reduce Fourier analysis into cells. His research aimed at the information transmission through communication channels. Gabor saw in his atoms a possibility to transmit the same information but using less data. Instead of transmitting the signal itself it would be possible to transmit only the coefficients which represent the same signal using his atoms.

== Mathematical definition ==
The family of Gabor functions is defined by

$$g_{\ell,n}(x) = g(x - a\ell)e^{2\pi ibnx}, \quad \ell,n \in \mathbb{Z}$$

where a and b are constants and g is a fixed function in L^{2}(R), such that ||g|| = 1. Depending on $a$, $b$, and $g$, a Gabor system may be a basis for L^{2}(R), which is defined by discrete translations and modulations. This is similar to a wavelet system, which may form a basis through dilating and translating a mother wavelet.

When one takes

$$g(t) = A e^{-\pi t^2}$$

one gets the kernel of the Gabor transform.

== See also ==
- Gabor filter
- Gabor wavelet
- Fourier analysis
- Wavelet
- Morlet wavelet
