= Gábor Téglás =

Hungarian archaeologist (1848–1916)

Gábor Téglás (March 23, 1848–February 4, 1916) was a Hungarian archaeologist.

Born in Brassó (Brașov), in the Principality of Transylvania, he attended primary and secondary school in his native city. Téglás then studied law at the Royal University of Pest. Returning to Transylvania in 1871, he became a teacher at the state high school in Déva.

After settling in Déva, Téglás began to undertake archaeological research in the surrounding Hunyad County. Meanwhile, he set up the high school's annual journal, where his first research appeared. In 1888, he was elected a corresponding member of the Hungarian Academy of Sciences. The same year, he became director of the high school, serving until 1904.

At that point, he left for Budapest, leading a withdrawn existence in his house while continuing to publish. His research focused on prehistory and Roman Dacia in southwest Transylvania.
