= Sasha Gabor =

Hungarian-Norwegian actor and director

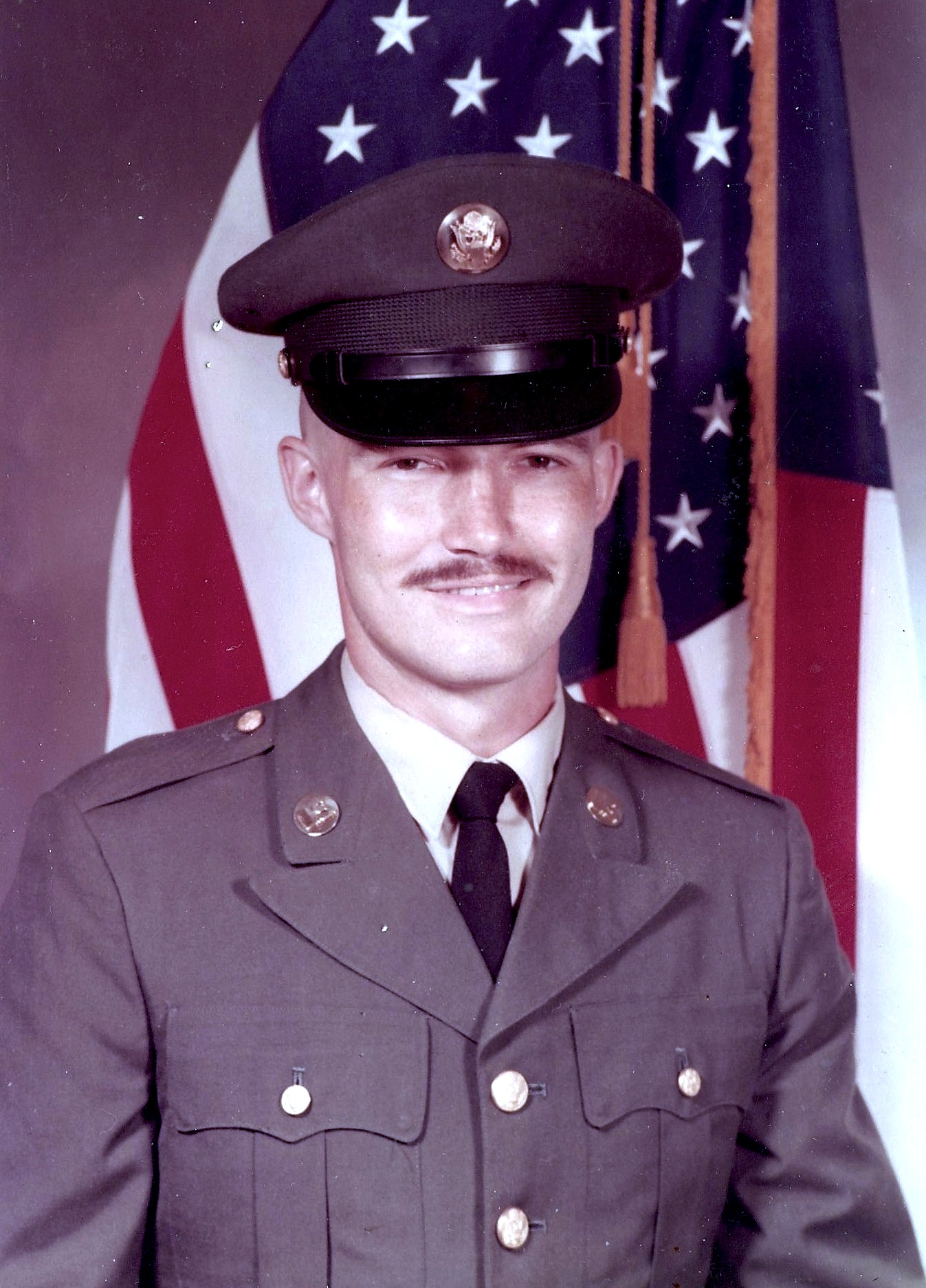
- Gabor in the 1970s when he was in the United States Army
- Born: Sámuel Guttmann; 6 June 1945; Hungary
- Died: 27 June 2008 (aged 63); Bangkok, Thailand
- Citizenship: Norway
- Occupation: Actor
- Years active: 1982–2001
- Style: Pornography; Film director
- Children: 5

Gábor Sárközy or Gabor Sarkøzy (born Sámuel Guttmann; 6 June 1945 – 27 June 2008), known professionally as Sasha Gabor, was a Hungarian-Norwegian actor and director. As a youth, he moved to Norway as a Hungarian refugee, eventually moving to the United States to pursue a career as a pilot, which eventually led to a career in film. While he acted in mainstream films, he was a look-alike for Burt Reynolds and Sean Connery, which popularized him in adult films, including parodies. He started making pornography at age 38 and retired in his sixties, with over 500 films in his canon. Labelled Norway's most famous porn actor by Morgenbladet, the three-times-married Gabor was described as "a womanizing alcoholic who played accordion, spoke eight languages, and was one of Ron Jeremy's best friends."

== Early life ==
Gabor was born Sámuel Guttmann in Hungary in 1945. He moved to Lillestrøm, Norway in 1957 as a refugee in the wake of the Hungarian Revolution. He left school and he played accordion, trumpet, and double bass for Cirkus Arnardo. He eventually moved to the United States, where he joined the United States Army and went to school to become an airplane pilot.

== Career ==
Prior to acting, Gabor worked as a commercial airline pilot. He eventually lost his commercial pilot license due to alcohol-related arrests.

In the early 1980s, Gabor was acting in small parts in mainstream films in Los Angeles. He was a Burt Reynolds lookalike, which he capitalized on, including working as a stand in for Reynolds in films. In 1982, he met Ron Jeremy while filming the Jerry Lewis comedy Cracking Up. Gabor and Jeremy saw each other again at an Adult Film Association of America gala in 1983. Attendees usually dressed in costumes and Gabor did his Burt Reynolds shtick including arriving in a black sports car complete with a vanity license plate reading "Bandit". He told Jeremy he was interested in the porn industry and Jeremy introduced him to his adult film industry contacts. He was 38 when he made his first adult film.

Gabor acted regularly in films by Bobby Bouchard. He performed in Burt Reynolds parody porn films, using the stage name Turd Wrenolds. He co-starred in the Smokey and the Bandit parody All-American Girls in Heat. He had plastic surgery to appear more like Reynolds.

Gabor was also a regular in Jeremy's films in the late 1980s, when Jeremy was a director for Leisure Time Entertainment. They filmed many films together, including 20 to 30 films on houseboats at Lake Mead with Samantha Strong and Tracey Adams, the result of having to film out of state due to obscenity laws in Los Angeles. Gabor's alcohol abuse often impacted his ability to get an erection, and Jeremy would often stand in for Gabor. Jeremy estimated that one-third of Gabor's films showed Jeremy's circumcised penis in lieu of Gabor's uncircumcised penis. Jeremy would serve as one of Gabor's best friends throughout Gabor's life.

Gabor traveled frequently to Thailand, where he would vacation and also have plastic surgery, which he documented in photographs. He stopped dying his hair black and let it go gray and had plastic surgery to look more like Sean Connery. Back in the United States, he worked as a Connery lookalike outside of porn, attending special events. He lived in Marina del Rey, California followed by Tampa, Florida.

Gabor retired from acting in 2001 and moved back to Norway after too many alcohol-related arrests and to escape from paying child support. In Norway, he planned to direct the first Norwegian professional porn film. In 2007, he said he was going to direct a Sámi-themed adult film in Kautokeino, Norway. The film was never made.

=== Views on the film industry ===
Gabor believed pornographic films were beneficial for men and women to watch, suggesting one can learn that "there is no one way to make girls climax" and that one can "learn many things from porn movies."

== Later life and legacy ==
Gabor was an alcoholic, which Ron Jeremy called "the bane of [Gabor's] existence." Gabor had been arrested for driving under the influence multiple times, having his license suspended indefinitely.

After retiring in 2001, Gabor moved back to Norway. Norwegian journalist Alex Rosén featured Gabor in his documentary series People on the Move for NRK1. The film was supposed to be aired in February 2001, but was delayed until March due to the controversial nature of the program. The film featured Gabor participating in a gang bang. Gabor died of cardiac arrest on 27 June 2008 on vacation in Bangkok, Thailand. Gabor was married three times and had five children.
