= Dennis Gabor =

Hungarian-British physicist (1900–1979)

Dennis Gabor CBE FRS
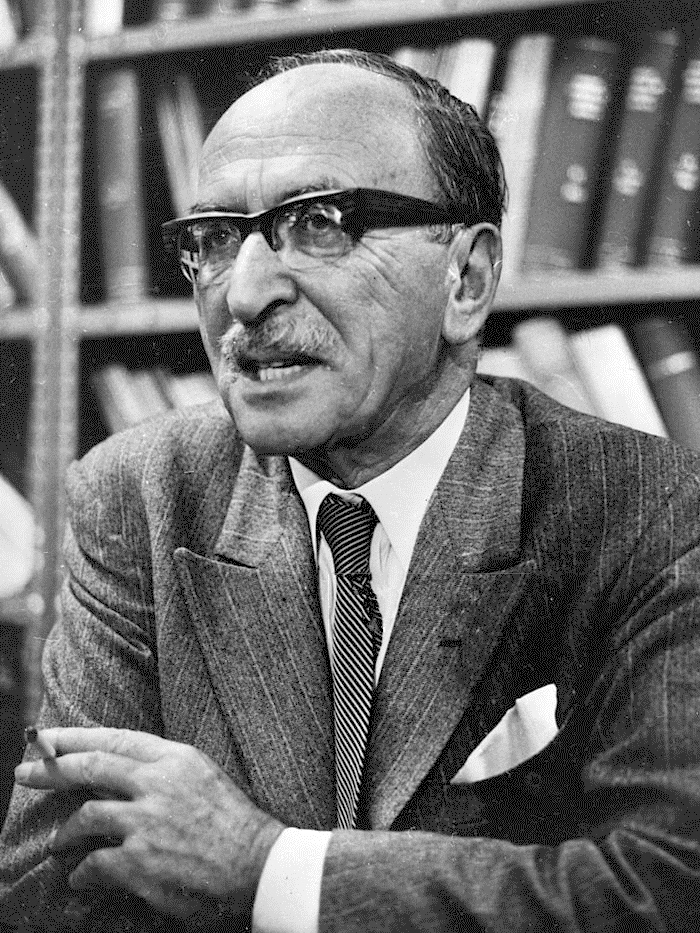
- Gabor in 1971
- Born: Günszberg Dénes; 5 June 1900; Budapest, Austria-Hungary
- Died: 9 February 1979 (aged 78); London, England
- Citizenship: Hungary; United Kingdom (1946–1979)
- Education: Technische Universität Berlin; Technical University of Budapest
- Occupation: Physicist
- Known for: Inventing holography; Gabor atom; Gabor filter; Gabor limit; Gabor transform; Gabor wavelet
- Spouse: Marjorie Louise Butler (m. 1936)
- Awards: FRS (1956); Young Medal and Prize (1967); Rumford Medal (1968); IEEE Medal of Honor (1970); Nobel Prize in Physics (1971)
- Scientific career
- Fields: Physics
- Workplaces: Imperial College London; British Thomson-Houston
- Doctoral students: Anthony G. Constantinides; Eric Ash

Dennis Gabor (Note: /ˈɡɑːbɔːr, ɡəˈbɔːr/ GAH-bor, gə-BOR; Hungarian: Gábor Dénes [ˈɡaːbor ˈdeːnɛʃ]) (5 June 1900 – 9 February 1979) was a Hungarian-British physicist who received the Nobel Prize in Physics in 1971 for his invention of holography. He obtained British citizenship in 1946 and spent most of his life in England.

== Life and career ==
Gabor was born as Günszberg Dénes, into a Jewish family in Budapest, Austria-Hungary. In 1900, his family converted to Lutheranism. Dennis was the first-born son of Günszberg Bernát and Jakobovits Adél. Despite having a religious background, religion played a minor role in his later life and he considered himself agnostic. In 1902, the family received permission to change their surname from Günszberg to Gábor. He served with the Hungarian artillery in northern Italy during World War I.

He began his studies in engineering at the Budapest University of Technology and Economics in 1918, later in Germany, at the Technische Hochschule Charlottenburg in Berlin, now known as Technische Universität Berlin. At the start of his career, he analysed the properties of high voltage electric transmission lines by using cathode-beam oscillographs, which led to his interest in electron optics. Studying the fundamental processes of the oscillograph, Gabor was led to other electron-beam devices such as electron microscopes and TV tubes. He eventually wrote his PhD thesis on Recording of Transients in Electric Circuits with the Cathode Ray Oscillograph in 1927, and worked on plasma lamps.

In 1933 Gabor fled from Nazi Germany, where he was considered Jewish, and was invited to Britain to work at the development department of the British Thomson-Houston company in Rugby, Warwickshire. During his time in Rugby, he met Marjorie Louise Butler, and they married in 1936. He became a British citizen in 1946, and it was while working at British Thomson-Houston in 1947 that he invented holography, based on an electron microscope, and thus electrons instead of visible light. He experimented with a heavily filtered mercury arc light source. The earliest visual hologram was only realised in 1964 following the 1960 invention of the laser, the first coherent light source. After this, holography became commercially available.

Gabor's research focused on electron inputs and outputs, which led him to the invention of holography. The basic idea was that for perfect optical imaging, the total of all the information has to be used; not only the amplitude, as in usual optical imaging, but also the phase. In this manner, a complete holo-spatial picture can be obtained. Gabor published his theories of holography in a series of papers between 1946 and 1951.

Gabor also researched how human beings communicate and hear; the result of his investigations was the theory of granular synthesis, although Greek composer Iannis Xenakis claimed that he was actually the first inventor of this synthesis technique. Gabor's work in this and related areas was foundational in the development of time–frequency analysis.

In 1948 Gabor moved from Rugby to Imperial College London, and in 1958 became professor of Applied Physics until his retirement in 1967. His inaugural lecture on 3 March 1959, 'Electronic Inventions and their Impact on Civilisation' provided inspiration for Norbert Wiener's treatment of self-reproducing machines in the penultimate chapter in the 1961 edition of his book Cybernetics.

As part of his many developments related to CRTs, in 1958 Gabor patented a new flat screen television concept. This used an electron gun aimed perpendicular to the screen, rather than straight at it. The beam was then directed forward to the screen using a series of fine metal wires on either side of the beam path. The concept was significantly similar to the Aiken tube, introduced in the US the same year. This led to a many-years patent battle which resulted in Aiken keeping the US rights and Gabor the UK. Gabor's version was later picked up by Clive Sinclair in the 1970s, and became a decades-long quest to introduce the concept commercially. Its difficult manufacturing, due to the many wires within the vacuum tube, meant this was never successful. While looking for a company willing to try to manufacture it, Sinclair began negotiations with Timex, who instead took over production of the ZX81.

In 1963 Gabor published Inventing the Future which discussed the three major threats Gabor saw to modern society: war, overpopulation and the Age of Leisure. The book contained the now well-known expression that "the future cannot be predicted, but futures can be invented." Reviewer Nigel Calder described his concept as, "His basic approach is that we cannot predict the future, but we can invent it..." Others such as Alan Kay, Peter Drucker, and Forrest Shaklee have used various forms of similar quotes. His next book, Innovations: scientific, technological, and social which was published in 1970, expanded on some of the topics he had already earlier touched upon, and also pointed to his interest in technological innovation as mechanism of both liberation and destruction.

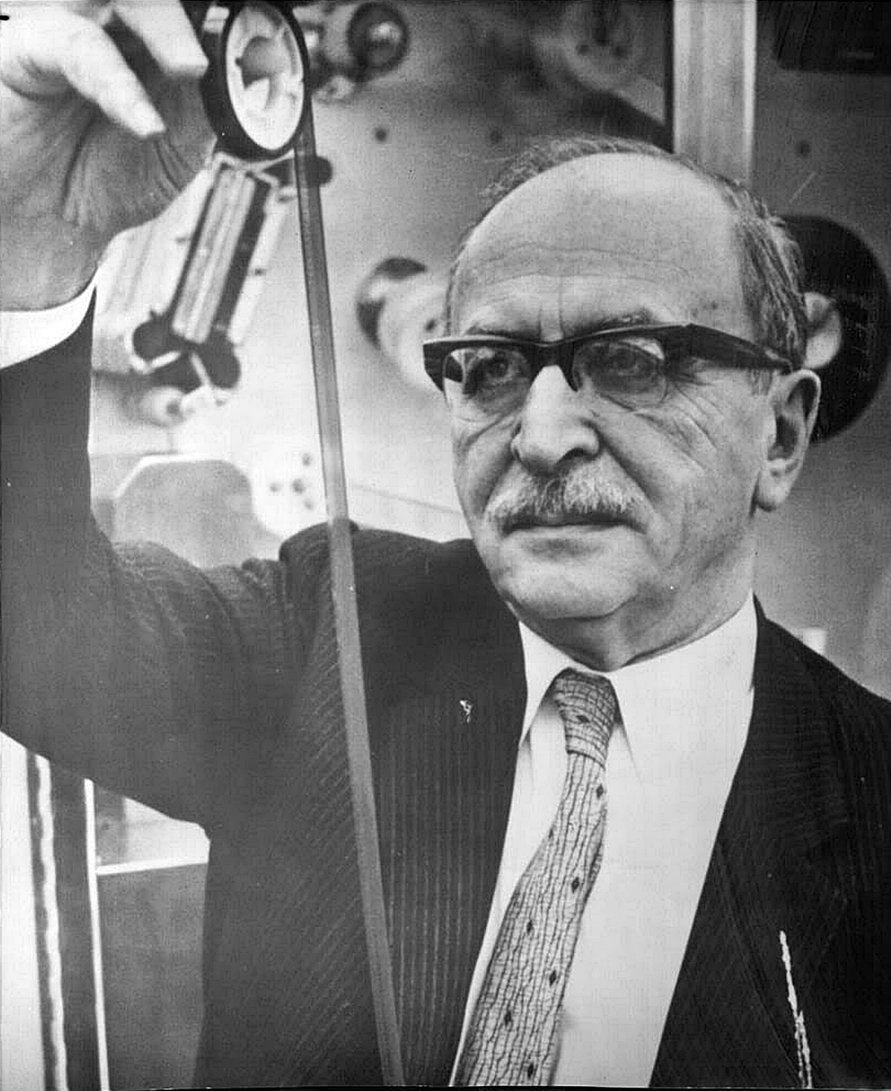
Gabor in 1971

In 1971 he was the single recipient of the Nobel Prize in Physics with the motivation "for his invention and development of the holographic method" and presented the history of the development of holography from 1948 in his Nobel lecture.

While spending much of his retirement in Italy at Lavinio Rome, he remained connected with Imperial College as a senior research fellow and also became staff scientist of CBS Laboratories, in Stamford, Connecticut; there, he collaborated with his lifelong friend, CBS Labs' president Dr. Peter C. Goldmark in many new schemes of communication and display. One of Imperial College's new halls of residence in Prince's Gardens, Knightsbridge is named Gabor Hall in honour of Gabor's contribution to Imperial College. He developed an interest in social analysis and published The Mature Society: a view of the future in 1972. He also joined the Club of Rome and supervised a working group studying energy sources and technical change. The findings of this group were published in the report Beyond the Age of Waste in 1978, a report which was an early warning of several issues that only later received widespread attention.

Following the rapid development of lasers and a wide variety of holographic applications (e.g., art, information storage, and the recognition of patterns), Gabor achieved acknowledged success and worldwide attention during his lifetime. He received numerous awards besides the Nobel Prize.

Gabor died in a nursing home in South Kensington, London, on 9 February 1979. In 2006 a blue plaque was put up on No. 79 Queen's Gate in Kensington, where he lived from 1949 until the early 1960s.

== Personal life ==
On 8 August 1936, he married Marjorie Louise Butler. They did not have any children.

== Publications ==
- 1944 - The electron microscope at the Internet Archive
- 1963 - Inventing the Future at the Internet Archive
- 1970 - Innovations: Scientific, Technological, and Social at the Internet Archive
- 1972 - The Mature Society at the Internet Archive
- 1972 - The proper priorities of science and technology - OL 5460593M
- 1978, with Umberto Colombo, Alexander King and Ricardo Galli - Beyond the Age of Waste: A Report to the Club of Rome at the Internet Archive

== Awards and honors ==
- 1956 – Elected a Fellow of the Royal Society (FRS)
- 1964 – Honorary Member of the Hungarian Academy of Sciences
- 1964 – D.Sc., University of London
- 1967 – Young Medal and Prize, for distinguished research in the field of optics
- 1967 – Columbus Award of the International Institute for Communications, Genoa
- 1968 – The first Albert A. Michelson Medal from The Franklin Institute, Philadelphia
- 1968 – Rumford Medal of the Royal Society
- 1970 – Honorary Doctorate, University of Southampton
- 1970 – Medal of Honor of the Institute of Electrical and Electronics Engineers
- 1970 – Commander of the Order of the British Empire (CBE)
- 1971 – Nobel Prize in Physics, for his invention and development of the holographic method
- 1971 – Honorary Doctorate, Delft University of Technology
- 1972 – Holweck Prize of the Société Française de Physique
- 1972 – Honorary Member of the Optical Society of America

== Legacy and commemoration ==
- 1983 – the International Society for Optical Engineering (SPIE) established the annual Dennis Gabor Award, "in recognition of outstanding accomplishments in diffractive wavefront technologies, especially those which further the development of holography and metrology applications."
- 1989 – the Royal Society of London began issuing the Gabor Medal for "acknowledged distinction of interdisciplinary work between the life sciences with other disciplines".
- 1992 – Dennis Gabor University (until 2023, Gábor Dénes College), was founded in Budapest, Hungary, named after Gabor.
- 1993 – the NOVOFER Foundation of the Hungarian Academy of Sciences established its annual International Dennis Gabor Award, for outstanding young scientists researching in the fields of physics and applied technology.
- 2000 – the asteroid 72071 Gábor is named after Gabor.
- 2006 – English Heritage erected a blue plaque at Gabor's former residence, 79 Queen's Gate, South Kensington, London.
- 2008 – the Institute of Physics renamed its Duddell Medal and Prize, established in 1923, into the Dennis Gabor Medal and Prize.
- 2009 – Imperial College London opened the Gabor Hall, named in the scientist's honour.
- Dennis-Gabor-Straße in Potsdam is named in his honour and is the location of the Potsdamer Centrum für Technologie.

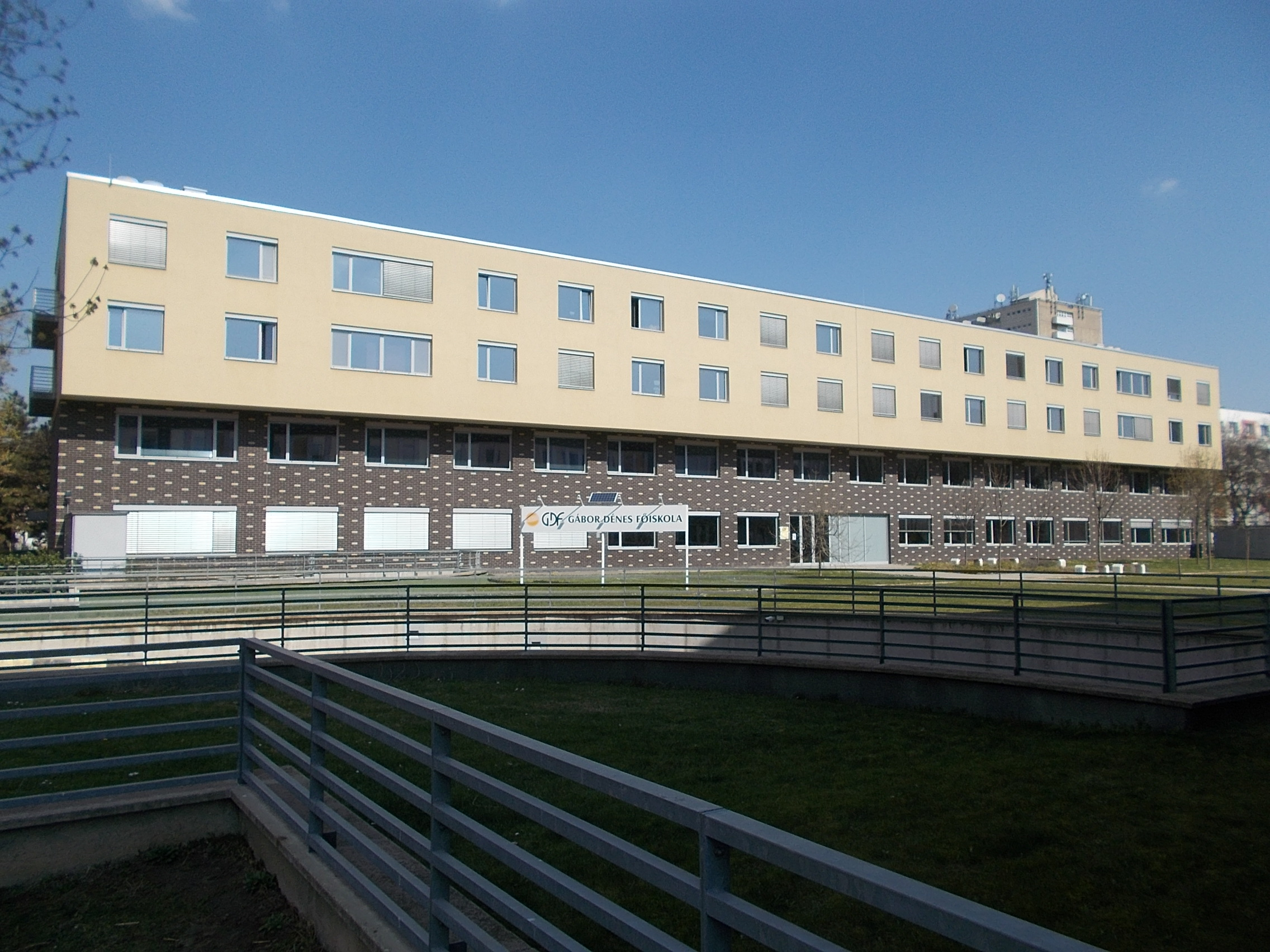
Dennis Gabor University in 2019 (then known as Dennis Gabor College)

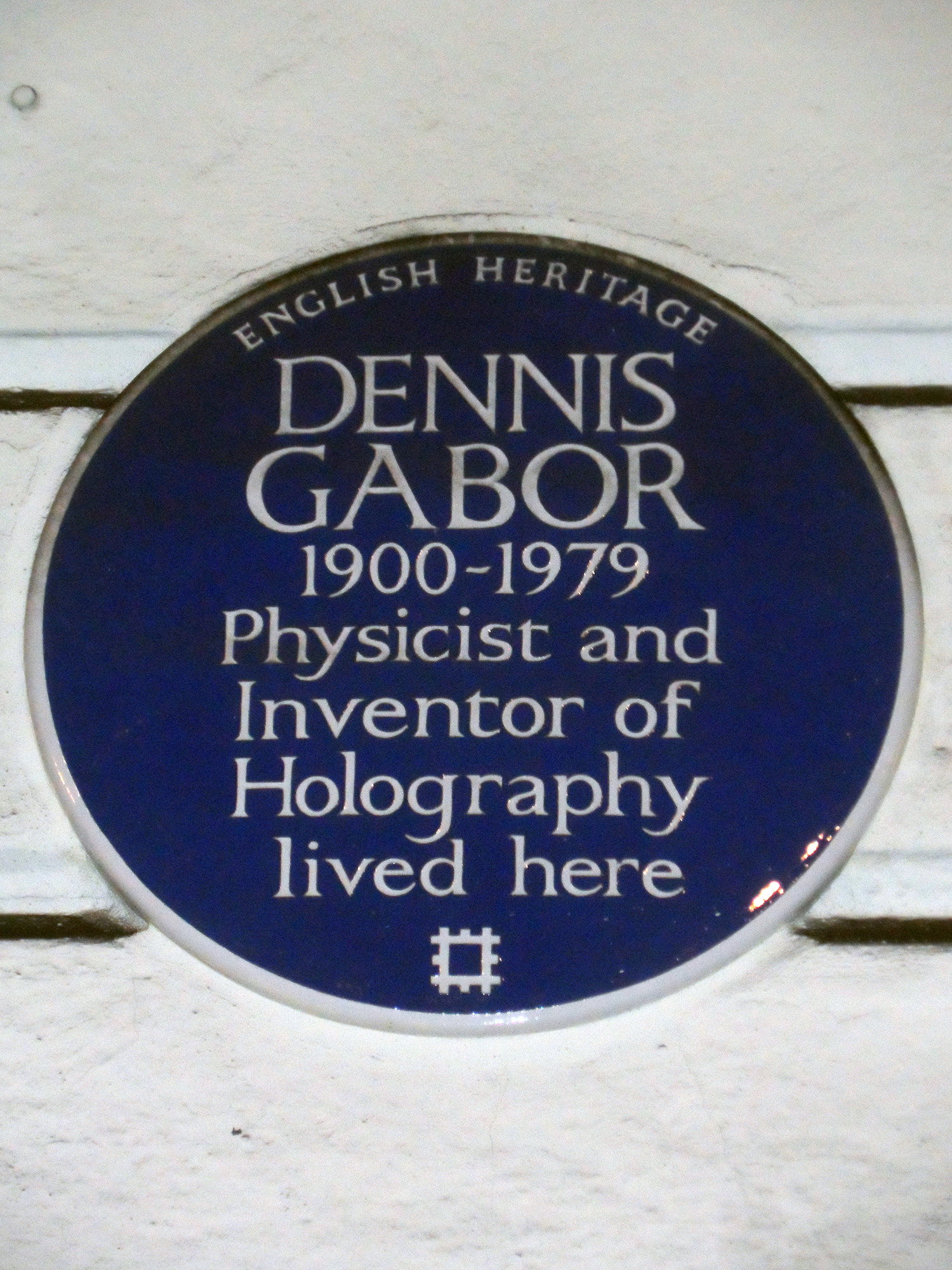
English Heritage's blue plaque at Gabor's former residence in South Kensington

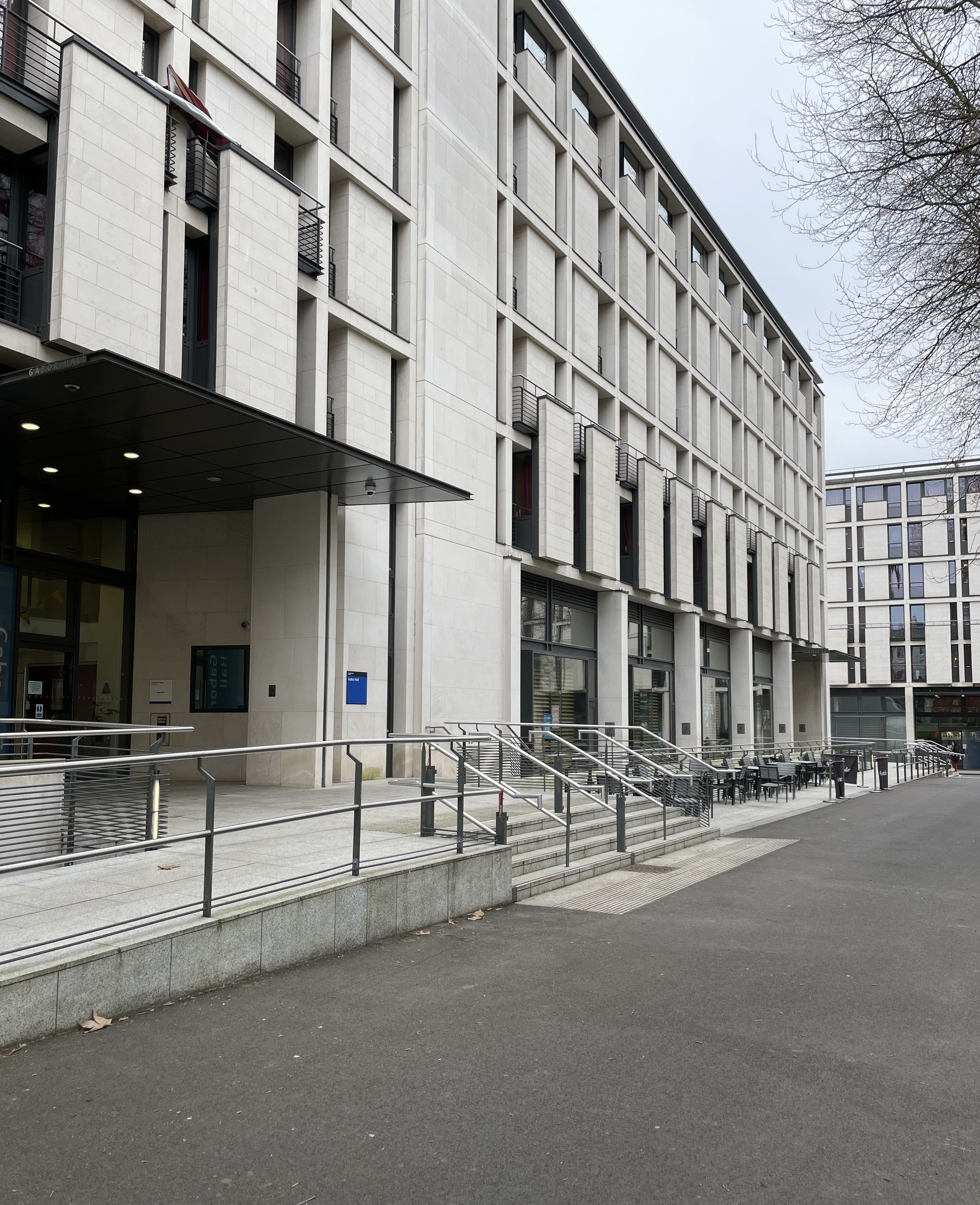
The front entrance of Gabor Hall, Imperial College London (opened in 2009)

== In popular culture ==
- The Gabor family from the animated TV series Jem and The Holograms was named after Dennis Gabor.
- On 5 June 2010, the logo for the Google website was drawn to resemble a hologram in honour of Dennis Gabor's 110th birthday.
- In David Foster Wallace's Infinite Jest, Hal suggests that "Dennis Gabor may very well have been the Antichrist."

== See also ==
- Adaptive Gabor representation
- Gabor expansion
- Gabor frame
- Microsound
- Meniscus corrector
- Gábor Dénes College
- List of Jewish Nobel laureates
