= Armada =

Armada is the Spanish and Portuguese word for naval fleet. Armáda is the Czech and Slovak word for armed forces.

Armada may also refer to:

== Military ==
=== Explorations and military campaigns ===
- Portuguese India Armadas (armadas da Índia), fleets of ships dispatched from Portugal to India, following the sea route opened up by Vasco da Gama in 1497–1499
- 2nd Portuguese India Armada (Cabral, 1500)
- 3rd Portuguese India Armada (Nova, 1501)
- 4th Portuguese India Armada (Gama, 1502)
- 5th Portuguese India Armada (Albuquerque, 1503)
- 6th Portuguese India Armada (Albergaria, 1504)
- 7th Portuguese India Armada (Almeida, 1505)

=== Military campaigns ===
- Spanish Armada or Great Armada, an unsuccessful attempted invasion of England by Spain in 1588
- English Armada or Counter Armada, an unsuccessful English naval campaign in 1589 aimed at capturing Lisbon and other coastal towns from Spain
- 2nd Spanish Armada, a second unsuccessful Spanish invasion of England in 1596
- 3rd Spanish Armada, a third unsuccessful Spanish invasion of England in 1597
- 4th Spanish Armada, a fourth unsuccessful Spanish invasion, this time via Ireland in 1601
- Armada of 1779, an unsuccessful attempt to invade England by France and Spain in 1779

=== Ships ===
- HMS Armada, two ships in the British Royal Navy
- USS Armada (AM-145), a World War II minesweeper of the US Navy

=== Armed forces ===
- Armada, the Spanish Navy
- Armada Bolivariana de Venezuela, the Bolivarian Navy of Venezuela
- Armáda České republiky, the Military of the Czech Republic
- Armada de Chile, the Chilean Navy
- Armada Ecuatoriana, the Ecuadorian Navy
- Armada Nacional, the Colombian National Armada
- Armada Portuguesa, the Portuguese Navy
- Armada de la República Argentina, the Argentine Navy
- Marina Armada, the Mexican Navy
- Armada de Barlovento, a subdivision of the Spanish Navy assigned to the Windward Islands during the 1700s
- Komando Armada Barat (Western Fleet Command) and Komando Armada Timur (Eastern Fleet Command), fleets of the Indonesian Navy

== Arts and entertainment ==
=== Music ===
- Armada (album), an album by black metal band Keep of Kalessin
- The Armada (band), a band formed by ex-The Tea Party lead singer Jeff Martin
- Armada Music, a music label created by Armin van Buuren
- La Armada, Dominican-American hardcore punk band
- Groove Armada, English electronic duo

=== Gaming ===
- Armada (video game), a video game
- Star Trek: Armada, a Star Trek video game
- Wing Commander: Armada, a video game by Origin Systems
- Battlefleet Gothic: Armada, a Warhammer 40,000 game

=== Publishing ===
- Armada (novel), a 2015 novel by Ernest Cline
- The Armada (book) (1959), a Pulitzer Prize-winning history of the Spanish Armada by Garrett Mattingly
- Armada (comics), a division of Acclaim Comics Inc., which published licensed own properties
- Armada Books, a defunct publishing house

== Television ==
- Transformers: Armada
- "Armada", an episode of Transformers: Prime

== Businesses ==
- Armada (company), a company that produces alpine skis and outerwear
- Armada Centre, a shopping centre in Plymouth, England

== People ==
- Armada (gamer) (Adam Lindgren, born 1993), professional Super Smash Bros. player
- General Alfonso Armada, a Spanish military officer condemned as one of the plotters of the 23-F attempted coup
- Juan Armada y Losada (1861–1932), Spanish politician
- Yolexis Rodríguez Armada (born 1971), Cuban politician

== Places ==
- Armada, Arkansas, a ghost town
- Armada, Michigan, a small village in the US
- Armada House, Bristol, in Bristol, England
- Armada Road Multi-Family District, a U.S. historic district in Venice, Florida
- Armada Towers, in Dubai, U.A.E.
- Armada Township, Buffalo County, Nebraska

== Sports teams ==
- Armada Rijeka, a football-fan club from Rijeka, Croatia
- La Armada, a nickname for the Spain Davis Cup team
- Long Beach Armada, a professional baseball team based in Long Beach, California
- Blainville-Boisbriand Armada, a junior ice hockey team based in Boisbriand, Quebec
- Jacksonville Armada FC, a professional soccer team based in Jacksonville, Florida

== Transportation ==
- Mahindra Armada, an Indian SUV/MUV
- Nissan Armada, a Japanese-American full-size SUV

== Other uses ==
- Armada (Bas-Lag), the name of a fictional floating city in China Miéville's novel The Scar
- Armada (Capoeira), a move in the Brazilian martial art capoeira
- Armada (moth), a genus of moths of the family Noctuidae
- Armada de Molucca, a 1519 exploration fleet led by Ferdinand Magellan
- Compaq Armada, a model of laptop computer

== See also ==
- Armado (disambiguation)
- Armata (disambiguation)
