= Amaryllis (disambiguation) =

Amaryllis is a small genus of flowering bulbs, with two species.

Amaryllis may also refer to:

== People ==
- Amaryllis Chanda Feldman (born 1976), American poet; better known as Chanda Feldman
- Amaryllis Fleming (1925–1999), British cello performer and teacher
- Amaryllis Garnett (1943–1973), English actress
- Amaryllis (Ryllis) Llewellyn Hacon, pseudonym of Edith Hacon, later Mrs Robichaud (1875–1952), British suffragist, WWI nursing hospital volunteer and socialite
- Amaryllis Knight, co-owner and operator of Falcon Motorcycles
- Amaryllis Tremblay, Canadian actress
- Amaryllis, a character in Vergil's Eclogues
- Amaryllis, a character in Meredith Willson's The Music Man

== In biology ==
- The amaryllis family, a monocot plant family formally known as Amaryllidaceae
- Amaryllis berteroi, also known as Zephyranthes robusta
- Schinia amaryllis, a moth of the family Noctuidae
- Hippeastrum, a genus of South American bulbs whose cultivars are commonly sold as "amaryllis"
- Amaryllis (crustacean), a genus of amphipods

== Music ==
- Amaryllis Chamber Ensemble, in Boston
- Amaryllis (Marilyn Crispell album), 2000
- Amaryllis (Shinedown album), a 2012 album by Shinedown and its title track
- "Amaryllis" (song), a 1988 by the Japanese band Wink
- "Amaryllis", a 1581 gavotte from the Ballet Comique de la Reine by Balthasar de Beaujoyeulx
- "Amaryllis", a 17th-century air de cour composed by Louis XIII of France; see Ballet Comique de la Reine

== Other uses ==
- Amaryllis (catamaran), a catamaran sailboat by Nathanael Greene Herreshoff launched in 1876
- Amaryllis (given name)
- Amaryllis (restaurant), in Glasgow, Scotland
- Amaryllis (ship), which wrecked on the coast of Palm Beach County, Florida in 1965
- Amaryllis (yacht), built in 2011 by Abeking & Rasmussen
- 1085 Amaryllis, a minor planet orbiting the Sun
- "Amaryllis", an award-nominated short story by Carrie Vaughn
- "Opp Amaryllis!", a 1791 song by Carl Michael Bellman

== See also ==
- Amarillo (disambiguation)
- Amarilis (disambiguation)
