= Amarillo =

Amarillo, yellow or golden in Spanish, may refer to:

== Places ==
- Amarillo, Texas, city in the US
- Amarillo, Western Australia, former name for Keralup, Western Australia

== People ==
- Amarillo Slim (1928–2012), American poker player
- Eric Amarillo (born 1971), Swedish singer
- Moses Amarillo (18th century), Greek rabbi

== Music ==
=== Record labels ===
- Amarillo Records, a record label

=== Songs ===
- "Amarillo" (Gorillaz song), 2011
- "Amarillo" (J Balvin song), 2020
- "Amarillo" (Shakira song), 2017
- "(Is This the Way to) Amarillo", a 1971 song written and released by Neil Sedaka as "Amarillo"
- "Amarillo", a 1975 song from the album Elite Hotel by Emmylou Harris
- "Amarillo", a 1999 song from the album Escorpión de Primavera by Anasol

== Other uses ==
- Amaryllis, a plant commonly referred to as amarillo
- "Amarillo" (Better Call Saul), an episode of Better Call Saul

== See also ==
- Amaryllis (disambiguation)
- Armadillo (disambiguation)
