= AGR =

AGR may refer to:

== Finance ==
- Adjusted Gross Revenue, an accounting term related to revenue
- Agere Systems, a ticker symbol on the New York Stock Exchange

== Technology ==
- Accessory gene regulator, genes that control the virulence of Staphylococcus aureus
- Adaptive Gabor representation
- Advanced gas-cooled reactor, a type of nuclear reactor
- Advanced Graphics Riser, a type of slot found on some computer motherboards
- A US Navy hull classification symbol: Radar picket ship (AGR)

== Transport ==
- AGR (automobile), an English automobile
- Agra Airport in India, in its International Air Transport Association (IATA) code
- Alabama and Gulf Coast Railway, in its reporting mark
- Angel Road railway station in the UK, in its three-letter station code
- Avon Park Air Force Range in the US, in its Federal Aviation Administration location identifier (FAA LID)

== Language and linguistics ==
- Agr (linguistics), a functional category that heads AgrP and that syntactically manipulates morphological agreement
- Agreement (linguistics), morphological change depending on other words
- Aguaruna language, a language spoken in Northern Peru

== Other uses ==
- Agr. (profession), abbreviation and title for a professional agriculturist
- Active Guard Reserve, a restricted and specialized active duty program of US military reserves
- Agenzia Giornalistica RCS, an Italian news agency
- Agrippa (praenomen)
- Agritubel, a French professional road race cycling team
- Alpha Gamma Rho, the largest social-professional fraternity in the US
- Amstel Gold Race (disambiguation), a Dutch cycling classic
- Andretti Green Racing, a racing team in the IndyCar Series
- Architectural gear ratio, also known as anatomical gear ratio
- Asheville Global Report, an independent weekly newspaper
- Association of Graduate Recruiters
