= INGRADA =

The International Network of Graduate Recruitment And Development Associations (INGRADA) consists of a number of associations from around the globe which represent professionals involved in the recruitment and development of university and college graduates.

INGRADA is a non-political, non-profit organisation which provides its members with the capacity to network and share information about graduate recruitment and development across international boundaries.

Existing members of INGRADA include the National Association of Colleges and Employers (NACE), the Association of Graduate Recruiters (AGR), the Canadian Association of Career Educators and Employers (CACEE), the South African Graduate Recruitment Association (SAGRA) and the Australian Association of Graduate Employers (AAGE).
