= Graduate recruitment =

Process of employers hiring college grads

Graduate recruitment, campus recruitment or campus placement refers to the process whereby employers undertake an organised program of attracting and hiring students who are about to graduate from schools, colleges, and universities.

Graduate recruitment programs are widespread in most of the developed world. Employers commonly attend campuses to promote employment vacancies and career opportunities to students who are considering their options following graduation. In the United Kingdom, the process of employers visiting a series of universities to promote themselves is called the milk round. The COVID-19 pandemic brought about a significant switch in how employers engage with students on campus with many moving to virtual events to engage with university students. For many employers, not being able to hand out their brochures and other print literature brought about a wider reconsideration of their impact on the environment, with the establishment of the Sustainable Recruitment Alliance. For many employers, the switch to virtual campus engagement was not only more efficient from a time and resource perspective, but it was better for the environment. As such, many employers may look to continue with virtual engagement instead of campus visits.

Selection methods used by employers include interviews, aptitude tests, role plays, written assessments, group discussions and presentations.

Many schools, colleges and universities provide their students with independent advice via a careers advisory service which is staffed by professional careers advisors. The careers advisory service often organizes a careers fair or job fair where a large number of employers visit the campus at once giving students the opportunity to meet a range of potential employers.

Employers involved in graduate programs often form themselves into professional bodies or associations to share best practice or to collaborate in setting a recruitment code of practice. Larger companies with high levels of graduate employment opportunities often install online recruitment devices to deal with the high number of applications. These can be made up of several question based screening stages in which the candidate has to pass before reaching an interview.

Careers advisors also form themselves into professional bodies or associations to ensure that current best practice is shared across members and passes onto students.

Examples of professional associations in the graduate recruitment sector include:

- National Association of Colleges and Employers (NACE) in the United States
- Canadian Association of Careers Educators and Employers (CACEE) in Canada
- Institute of Student Employers (ISE) and the Association of Graduate Careers Advisory Services (AGCAS) in the United Kingdom
- Australian Association of Graduate Employers (AAGE) in Australia
- New Zealand Association of Graduate Employers (NZAGE) in New Zealand
- South African Graduate Employers Association (SAGEA) in South Africa

Many of the national professional associations are members of the International Network of Graduate Recruitment and Development Associations (INGRADA).

== See also ==
- Job fair
- Simultaneous Recruiting of New Graduates
