= NACE =

NACE may refer to:

- NACE (region), North Atlantic and Central European region
- NACE (NAHL), a junior ice hockey team that played in the North American Junior Hockey League during the 1989–90 season
- "Nace" (song), by Colombian pop singer Anasol, 2006
- National Association of Colleges and Employers, US
- National Association of Collegiate Esports, North America
- National Association of Corrosion Engineers, US
- Statistical Classification of Economic Activities in the European Community – from the French, Nomenclature Statistique des activités économiques dans la Communauté européenne
