= Armado =

Armado may refer to:

- Armardeh, a city in Iran
- A character in Love's Labour's Lost
- Grupo Armado, a Nicaraguan rock band

== See also ==
- Armada (disambiguation)
- Armadillo (disambiguation)
