= Armada Way =

Commercial avenue in Plymouth, England

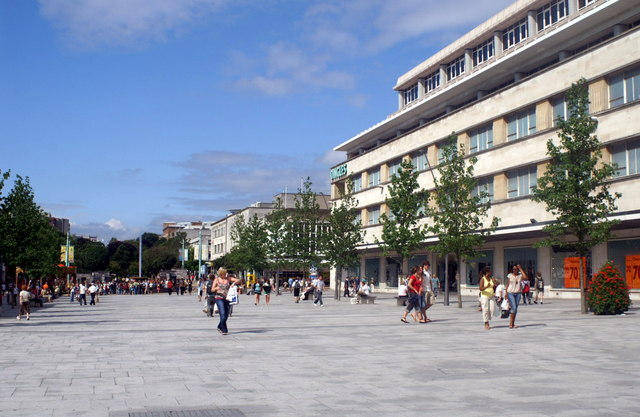
- Armada Way in 2006
- Interactive map of Armada Way
- Type: Pedestrian Avenue
- Location: Plymouth, England.
- Coordinates: 50.37141°N 4.14244°W
- Area: 0.042 square kilometres (4.2 ha)
- Established: 1994
- Designer: Sir Patrick Abercrombie, Plymouth City Council.
- Status: Open, under renovation.
- Parking: No on-site parking, multi-storey parking nearby at Drake Circus Shopping Centre
- Public transit: Large number of bus stops on Royal Parade.
- Facilities: Public toilets

Armada Way is a kilometre long, primarily pedestrian-only, commercial avenue and public plaza linking the Plymouth Hoe to the roundabout south of Plymouth railway station.

== Features ==
Armada Way is a major commercial high street in Plymouth, it contains a number of shops alongside it including the Armada Shopping Centre which contains a Sainsbury's, Wilko, Peacocks, and more.

Armada Way was called a "heritage asset of high significance" by Plymouth City Council in a report commissioned in 2014, and this claim has been repeated again by the council in 2019 and 2024.

== History ==
=== 1941–1950s: Initial planning and construction ===
In July 1941, Lord Mayor Waldorf Astor was told "not to worry about finances or local restrictions" when rebuilding Plymouth. He approached the architect Patrick Abercrombie who first visited Plymouth in 1941, when he established the idea for what is now known as Armada Way.

On 27 April 1944 Abercrombie's Plan for Plymouth, to rebuild the damage caused to the city by The Blitz, was published. It called for demolition of the few remaining pre-War buildings in the city centre to make way for their replacement with wide, parallel, modern boulevards aligned east–west linked by a north–south avenue linking the railway station with the of Plymouth Hoe. The road was originally designed to be a kilometre long tree-lined route running through the city centre. It was originally named Phoenix Way, but was later renamed.

Due to the scale of Armada Way and the post-war planning, the road was constructed in phases, extended as buildings were demolished. The original 1950s braille garden was the oldest section of the original road to still exist until 2023.

New ring roads were constructed around the city centre to divert traffic away from the new boulevard, allowing for pedestrians to access the area freely.

=== 1980s: First redevelopment ===
The majority of the modern-day Armada way was constructed in the 1980s when the a large number of the roads in the city centre were pedestrianised, and are yet to be updated.

Heavy landscaping was completed during phases the 1980s, giving Armada Way its unique piecemeal look. In 1988, a fire-beacon was lit on Armada Way to celebrate the 400th anniversary of the sighting of the Spanish Armada.

=== 2022–2024: Second redevelopment ===
Plymouth City Council announced a scheme to revamp the existing Armada Way to modernise the street. The scheme proved to be incredibly controversial due to a large number of trees being removed. During this time, renovations to the adjacent Old Town Street and New George Street also began. On 21 November 2022, the council announced that it would pause the scheme to review it following environmental concerns.

On 20 January 2023, the council published a revised scheme which prevented 7 of the trees from being felled, these plans called for 129 trees to be felled with 169 new trees to be planted. Local campaigning group Save the Trees of Armada Way (STRAW) responded saying the new plans were "extremely disappointing".

In the early hours of 15 March 2023 the council began felling the 129 tees on Armada Way, despite public outcry including a petition with over 12,000 signatures being sent to the council. STRAW received an emergency injunction from the courts preventing the felling of trees, however by the time it was approved 116 trees had already been felled, leaving only 13 standing. A judicial review was then called to investigate if the felling was lawful. At the end of march, a Mural was added to Armada Way depicting the damage taken by Plymouth during The Blitz.

After the 2023 Plymouth City Council election, the new Labour council withdrew the decision to fell the trees. Since the decision to fell the trees was revoked there was no reason the case against the council was dismissed. In November 2023, work began on cleaning up the felled trees.

On 19 February 2024, the council announced a new scheme for Armada Way had been approved following public consultation which includes the planting over 200 trees, new sustainable drainage systems, additional seating, installation of defibrillators, and a play village amongst other changes. However, STRAW launched legal action against the council which delayed the work in May 2024.
