= Passion pay =

Korean term satirising low youth wages

Passion pay (Korean: 열정페이; Hanja: 熱情pay) is a neologism used by young people in South Korea. The similar term in use in Japan is Yarigai sakushu (Japanese: やりがい搾取, Hepburn: Yarigai sakushu) where the translation would be closer to job satisfaction 'exploitation' (of labor).

The concept refers to low wages paid by employers to workers, particularly the younger or the relatively inexperienced ones, under the pretext that the job satisfaction compensates for the differential of the unpaid wages (which should be paid if the labor was to be fairly compensated). Young job seekers have coined the term "passion pay", which satirically refers to the reality that interns and apprentices are supposed to be passionate enough to put up with poor treatment. Desperate as job seekers, their use of this term denotes the phenomenon that interns have to put up with lower wages in hopes that this passion for the work could help brighten their prospects for decent jobs.

== History ==
The concept gained currency within Japan around 2007, when Japanese sociology researcher 本田由紀 (Yuki Honda) used the term yarigai sakushu (literally, 'job satisfaction exploitation', or It's rewarding exploitation) in her work. Within South Korea, the origin of the word is unclear, but it can be seen from the end of 2011 that the word was used mainly on the internet. In April 2011, Han Yun-hyung explained the case of 'passion labor' in his book. "Passion labor" is labor that takes passion for oneself and accepts the harsh environment naturally. Note that the Japanese and Korean terms have similar nuances although the word used for passion is different, and the Japanese word is stronger, with the insinuation of labor exploitation (搾取) while the Korean word is satirical, implying that passion constitutes the wages.

There is "Calculation method of Passion Fee" in the indie music magazine KarlfartZine (칼방귀) has been published in 2012 by Kim Kan-ji's article.

== Present ==
In 2016, according to Hyundai Research Institute, the number of workers aged 15–29 who received passion pay, which is below the minimum wage, totaled 635,000 as of the end of last year. The share of young workers who receive passion pay fell from 14.7 percent (539,000) in 2009 to 12.3 percent (449,000) in 2011 but has since surged back to 635,000 last year, an increase of 186,000 in just four years.

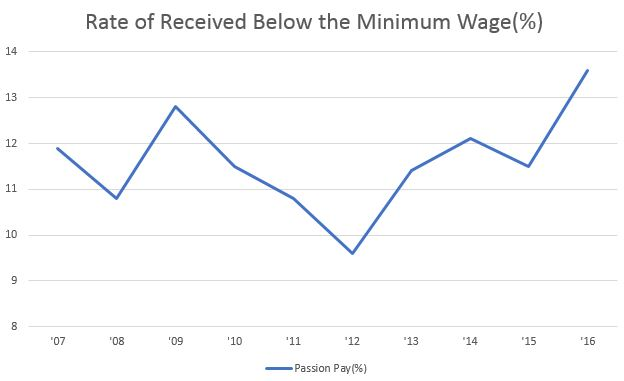
Rate of Received Below the Minimum Wage(%)

The ratio of workers receiving less than the minimum wage among all wage workers increased from 4.9% in 2002 to 13.6% in 2016. Compared to full-time and non-regular workers, the percentage of workers who did not receive the minimum wage differed by up to 9 times. Particularly, the ratio of persons who can not receive the minimum wage among the regular workers is 18.1%, dispatch and services (25.8%), calls (32.4%), irregular workers (26.9%) and part-time workers (41.2%) Were working at a substantial rate, well below the minimum wage. In particular, domestic industrial workers had 62.2% of the workers who were not able to receive the minimum wage, which was 9 times more than regular workers.

== Background ==
=== Broken law and social agreements ===
The reason why 'passion pay' happens easily is because it does not follow established laws and regulations. The most closely related law in South Korea is the Labor Standards Act. The Labor Standards Act sets minimum standards for working conditions in order to substantially protect workers who are relatively weak. There were about 1.36 million violations of the Labor Standards Act in South Korean workplaces from 2011–2015, and 5700 cases violating the minimum wage requirements.

=== Too many surplus workers ===
As of the year of 2016, the number of jobs in South Korea was 22.33 million, an increase of 220,000 (0.9%) over the previous year's 22.01 million. This is a very small increase. Out of 21 member countries of the OECD, Korea topped the list with the sharpest growth in youth unemployment. According to the National Statistical Office (NSO)'s annual employment trend for 2017, the number of employed workers increased by 317,000 last year (1.2%). The number of unemployed persons increased by 16,000 (1.6%) from a year ago to 1028,000 (unemployment rate of 3.7%). This is the highest level since the 2000. In particular, the increase in employment in the service industry, which is highly affected by the minimum wage, has slowed to 20,000.

=== Perception of cultural and artistic activity ===
The perception that culture and arts jobs do not have to pay wages for hours worked is widespread not only among employers but also among the general public. Perhaps this is because there is a kind of prejudice that culture and art jobs are different from other common jobs.

== Incidents ==
=== Japan ===
This concept is probably strongly imbued in the cultures of black companies.

The fine-print intended for volunteers of the Tokyo Olympics and Paralympics 2020 mentioned that the commutation and lodging/boarding will have to be paid for and arranged by the volunteer, inviting criticism in the media, and negative comparisons with black companies.

=== South Korea ===
==== Lee Sang-bong ====
Many young people engage in work with poor working conditions to earn work experience in the tough job market. In 2015, the Ministry of Employment and Labor of South Korea found 255 cases that went against labor regulations at 103 of 151 firms that hired interns. There were 19 companies that did not provide contracts and 50 that did not pay overtime. There were also 45 that paid less than the minimum wage.

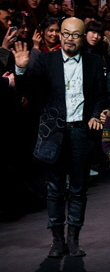
Lee Sang-Bong

Designer Lee Sang-Bong gave low wages of several hundred thousand won to apprentices and interns. Lee Sang-bong apologized on the afternoon of January 14, 2015 and promised to improve working conditions. Lee Sang-bong said in his apology, "We deeply apologize to young people and people in the fashion industry who are hurt by the work environment, treatment and operation of our company. ... I will take the lead in improving not only the salary but the problems of the fashion industry."

==== Nurses ====
Seoul National University Hospital is controversial because it pays 360,000 won as a starting point for new nurses. The hourly rate is about 1900 won, about one third of the minimum wage of 6470 won per hour (2017). This practice has been going on for nine years. Seoul National University laborer union said, "The new nurses received the initial salary of 300,000 won for the education cost, even though they worked 8 ~ 10 hours a day during the day and night, said the new nurse. It is difficult to accept a salary of 300,000 won because we have done formal medical act to write." According to the Seoul National University Hospital, new nurses will receive a formal education after receiving five weeks of pre-training from 2009. Nurses will receive an additional 4 weeks of education after their issuance and will receive a regular salary during this period. In addition to Seoul National University Hospital, the hospitals that forced no pay working for paying education wages instead of wages were revealed in the orientation period paychecks, which were confirmed by lawmaker Song Ok-joo, who received a report from the Seoul Regional Branch of the Public Transportation Union and the Health and Medical Unions. According to this data, Chungnam National University Hospital paid 300,000 won (3 weeks), National Central Medical Center 200,000 won (2 weeks), Ewha Womans University Hospital 280,000 won (4 weeks), Korea University Hospital 400,000 won (4 weeks), and Hanyang University Hospital and Busan Medical Center had no pay.

=== United Nations ===
At the heart of the controversy, the United Nations has more than 4,000 unpaid interns for two years, the British Guardian reported on August 14, 2015. According to UN data, the number of interns who worked unpaid in UN organizations during 2012–2013 was 4,18. Of these, 68% were women. The unpaid internship program of the United Nations became known to the world as a young man from New Zealand announced his resignation after six months of unpaid internship. David Hyde (22) began his internship at the UN headquarters in Geneva, Switzerland, without pay, but was forced to live in a tent because of expensive housing costs, according to reports published on August 13, 2015. He said the United Nations did not support interns for wages, transportation, food aid, or health insurance, so he had to go to sleep in a small blue tent with camping burners and mattresses. The story of the young man who resigned because he could not withstand the financial difficulties was known through the media, and the UN's "passion pay" dispute arose.

=== United States ===
According to the 2012 data from the National Association of Colleges and Employers, 55% of college graduates in 2012 experienced internships, nearly half of whom were unpaid interns. In the early years, non-profit organizations that demanded volunteer services had been employing unpaid internships for about one-third of companies seeking for-profit. Whether the unpaid internship is viewed as a valuable opportunity for young people to exploit their passion for the younger generation or to acquire actual job skills is a long-standing controversy in the United States. Under federal law, all employees are entitled to more than the minimum wage, except where there is an exception. If the employee's work is judged to be for the benefit of the employee rather than the benefit of the employer, that is to say, if the content or condition of the work is closer to the "training" of the training than to the actual work, it is not illegal. The US Department of Labor is concerned with wages and working hours that "internships are for interns' benefit and interns do not replace existing ones, but existing staff directs and manages internships, I understand that the internship is unpaid," and that the unpaid internship is not against the law at all. However, Judge William Foley Manhattan District Court in 2013 ruled that Fox Search light violated the Minimum Wage and Excess Allowance rules in a lawsuit filed by interns who participated in the films Black Swan and 500 Days of Summer. He was heated up by the interns' controversy when he ruled that the interns could receive wages. Judge Paul said that the work that interns did at that time was to bring immediate benefits to employers in the same way that existing paid employees did, and the knowledge gained by interns working was not training by education for training.

== Solution ==
The minimum wage is the minimum wage required for human life and the basic right guaranteed by the Constitution. Considering that low-wage work below the minimum wage is illegal, policy efforts must be followed to eradicate passion. First, the most fundamental measure is to create more good jobs for high-wage, which young people prefer. Second, in the recession period, as the pain is concentrated on small businesses and vulnerable workers, support for working conditions such as incentives for retention of employment and tax incentives for work should be backed up. Third, among young people, it is necessary to enhance the possibility of moving to a better job by strengthening education and training for vulnerable classes such as temporary workers, younger generations, and college students. Fourth, standard labor contract practices should be settled and legislated if necessary, and labor supervision and punishment for exterminating passion pay should be strengthened.

Another measure is imposing a strong penalty on entrepreneurs who engage in the practice of passion pay. There should be institutionalization to strictly comply with minimum wage. Even smaller companies should balance the market with the stability and development of venture companies. If the disparity in supply and demand in the job market is alleviated by eliminating the polarization of jobs, it means that passion pay will naturally disappear.

The Ministry of Employment and Labor announced that it plans to provide special work supervision of the wide-area unit to clothing and fashion design companies that are rampant in the practice of giving far lower wages to trainee and intern workers or part-timers. At Dongdaemun Design Plaza in central Seoul, where the 2015 F/W Seoul Fashion Week will be held on March 20, 2015, about 10 members of the Fashion Union, Part-time job Union, Youth Union and Jang Graphic Campaign Headquarters held a joint press conference to denounce Yeoljeong-Pay. "We oppose the 'passionate pay' of exploiting young people's labor at a bargain price," he said.

== See also ==
- Gapjil
- Hell Joseon
- Unpaid work
- Voluntary slavery
