= B. armata =

B. armata may refer to:

- Banksia armata, the prickly dryandra, a shrub species endemic to Western Australia
- Brahea armata, the Mexican blue palm or blue hesper palm, a palm species native to Baja California

== See also ==
- Armata (disambiguation)
