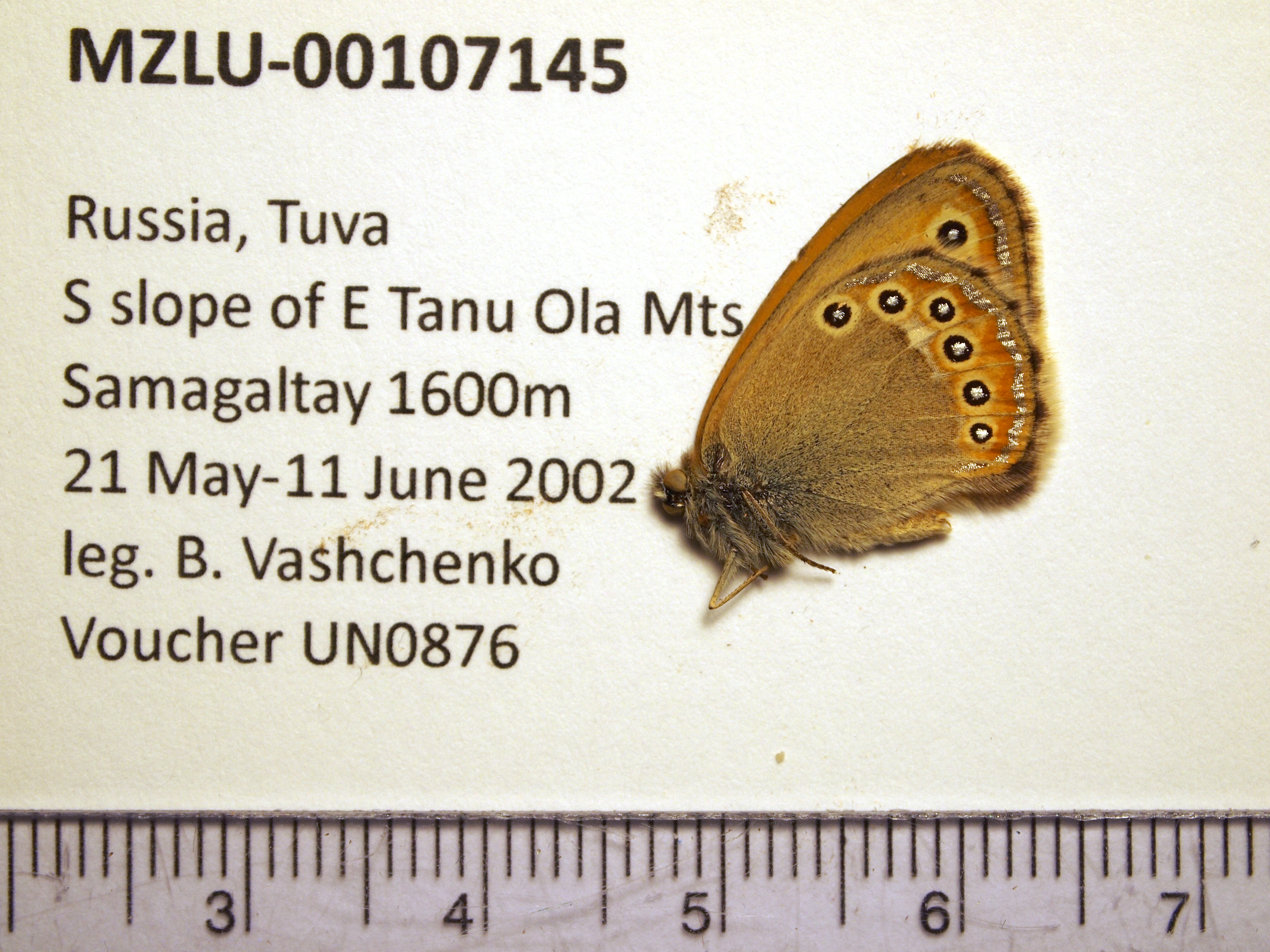
- Coenonympha amaryllis verso

Scientific classification
- Kingdom: Animalia
- Phylum: Arthropoda
- Clade: Pancrustacea
- Class: Insecta
- Order: Lepidoptera
- Family: Nymphalidae
- Genus: Coenonympha
- Species: C. amaryllis

Binomial name
- Coenonympha amaryllis (Stoll, 1782)

= Coenonympha amaryllis =

Species of butterfly

Coenonympha amaryllis is a small butterfly found in the East Palearctic that belongs to the browns family.

== Description from Seitz ==
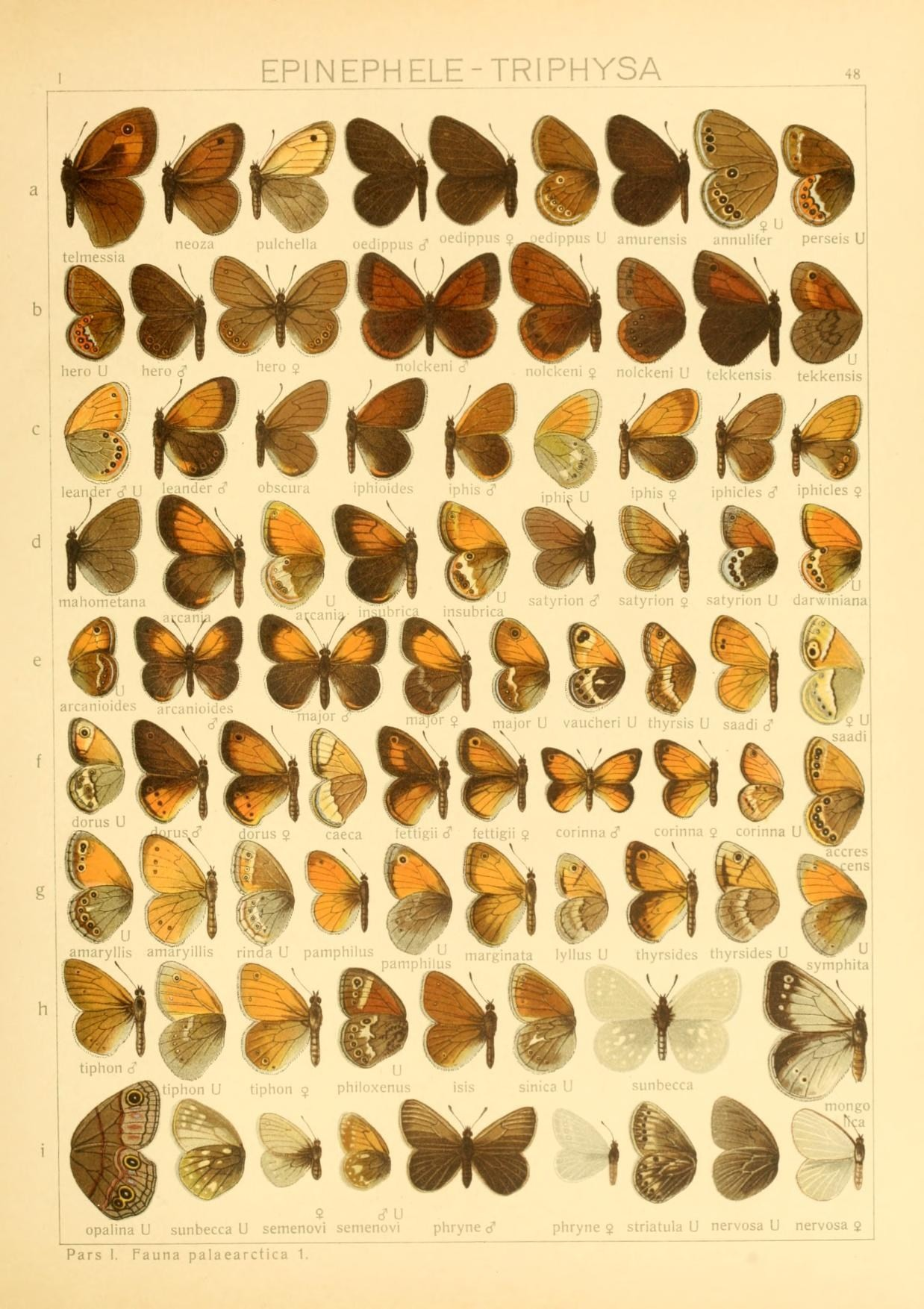
Seitz plate 48g

C. amaryllis. Upperside uniformly sandy yellow as in pamphilus, sometimes, especially in the female, slightly shaded at the distal margin. Underside pale honey-yellow, hindwing washed with greyish green; a faint line runs through the disc of the forewing. Rows of ocelli of very diverse development are situated before the distal margin. These are most distinct in the form accrescens Stgr. from North China and Corea. This form, which is especially common around Pekin (where specimens are found flying about in gardens, yards, and even in the streets), bears on the underside of the forewing 3 or 4 and on the hindwings 6 almost similar large ocelli with a metallic centre, which appear above as heavy black spots or small rings. — The first-described form, amaryllis Cr. (= amarillis Hbst.) (48 g), which occurs throughout Siberia and Mongolia, from the Ural to the Amur, has still the complete number of ocelli, but they are rather smaller, and only a few of them shine through above as minute black dots. — In rinda Men. [forma] (48 g), from Central and Eastern Siberia, the black ground of the ocelli has almost disappeared, so that the latter are very light, and the whole underside of all the wings is strongly dulled with grey. — In evanescens Alph. [forma], finality, the ocelli on the underside are obsolete except for a few traces, and on the upperside no pupils can be seen shining through. The metallic line on the underside is also absent. Amdo. — Small specimens from Ordos with especially washed-out markings on the underside have been designated ordossi [forma] by Alpheraky. — The butterflies are on the wing in June and July, are common and fond of settling on sandy places and stony mountain-roads or field-paths.

- f. accrescens occurs in North China, Korea and in Russia on the Ussuri . Seitz writes that the butterflies are particularly common in the Beijing area, "where they can be seen fluttering about in gardens, courtyards, and even on the streets."
- f. rinda is found in central and eastern Siberia.
- f. borisovi occurs in the vicinity of Lake Baikal

== Distribution ==
The range of the species extends from the Southern Urals through the steppe and forest-steppe zones of Southern Siberia and Kazakhstan to the Upper Amur Region, Primorye, China, and north to the Kolyma basin . The species is distributed in the forest-steppe and northern steppes.

== Biology ==
Butterflies inhabit rocky steppes and steppe meadows in the forest-steppe. In the mountains, the species is found on alpine meadows to heights up to 1500 m above sea level. The larva feeds on Poa. It develops in one generation per year. The flight time is from mid-June to mid-July. Butterflies fly near grasses, perching on stones. The caterpillar is green, with a white stripe along the back and two dark lines in a light stripe on each side. Wintering stage - caterpillar.

== Etymology ==
Named in the Classical tradition. Amaryllis is beloved of shepherds in the poetry of Theocritus and Virgil.

== See also ==
- List of butterflies of Europe
