= Gapjil =

South Korean neologism term for power harassment

- Hangul: 갑질
- Hanja: 甲질
- RR: gapjil
- MR: kapchil

Gapjil (Korean: 갑질) is an expression referring to an arrogant and authoritarian attitude or actions of people in South Korea who have positions of power over others. Gapjil is a neologism made by combining the word gap (갑; 甲)—the first of Heavenly Stems, which is used to introduce the first party in a contract, but also refers to superior status—and jil (-질), a suffix that negatively refers to particular actions. It is a phenomenon associated with the hierarchical nature of contemporary South Korean society and work culture, a structure which results in the social superiority of those with higher wealth.

== Causes ==
Song Jae-ryung, a professor of sociology at Kyunghee University, points out that gapjil is not simply a matter of an individual's morality, but a societal problem. As the bottom of Korean society is constituted by the repressive role of gap and submissive attitude of eul, individuals follow the culture of the elite. In other words, the cause of gapjil is a cultural tendency for people to merely perform the roles which are shaped by the high power distance in Korea. This is why an individual who was eul in another situation does the same thing (gapjil) in another relationship when he or she becomes another gap. In order to solve the gapjil problem, Prof. Song says that each individual needs to admit the social position that is different horizontally, not vertically, and the social atmosphere that fosters this awareness needs to be formed.

== Types and examples ==
According to Korean magazine Economic Review, there are some obvious types of gapjil depending on the context: owner gapjil, push-driven distribution gapjil, and passion-pay.

=== Owner gapjil ===
Owner gapjil is the most common type of gapjil, where representatives or executive family members of a company treat their employees with contempt, using abusive language or even physical assault. Owner gapjil reflects the attitude that employers can treat employees however they want because of the extreme vertical relationship between the two.

==== Monggo Food Kim Man-sik scandal ====
On 23 December 2015, there was a report that Kim Man-sik, honorary president of Monggo Food, had used abusive language and assaulted his chauffeur, known anonymously as 'B'. The assaulted employee said, "President Kim indulges in violence and hurl abuses almost like a habit, if his mood is bad". After Monggo Food posted an apology on its website on 23 December, Kim Man-sik and Kim Hyeon-seung, CEO of the firm, apologized to the public and to the person directly involved on 25 December in a press conference. Although there had been a disagreement with victims concerning a problem of reinstatement, an amicable settlement was made with the victims of the assault. On 19 April 2016, the Masan Branch of the Changwon District Public Prosecutor's Office requested that Kim Man-sik issue a summary order of 7,000,000 won (about 6,300 USD at the time) in fines relating to habitual assaults, violence and violation of labour standards.

==== Might & Main Choi Cheol-won scandal ====
In October 2010, Choi Cheol-won was the CEO of Might & Main, a division of SK Group. At that time, he called a tank truck driver who had gone on a demonstration in front of the SK headquarters to his office, and assaulted him with such objects as a baseball bat. As a result, the driver suffered injuries requiring two weeks of medical treatment. This incident was reported in the editorial program of MBC, which aired on 28 November 2010. Huge amounts of public criticism, particularly resulting from a memorandum that had been written to certify that the driver was given 20,000,000 won (about 18,000 USD at the time) as compensation for the violence. After Choi Cheol-won had been charged on 30 November, the police started to investigate the scandal. On 8 February 2011, the Seoul Central District Court sentenced him to 18 months in prison and the appellate tribunal sentenced him to 18 months in prison with three years of probation and 120 hours of community service. The judgement of the court's decision, saying "Social criticism is a reason for the sentence," caused controversy.

==== Nut rage and Korean Air scandals ====
The nut rage incident was an air rage incident that occurred on December 5, 2014 at John F. Kennedy International Airport in New York City. Korean Air vice president Heather Cho (Cho Hyun-ah), a daughter of the company chairman, dissatisfied with the way an attendant served nuts, ordered the aircraft to return to the gate before takeoff. After a heated confrontation with the cabin crew chief, Cho assaulted him and ordered him fired and removed from the plane, requiring a return to the gate and delaying the flight. The airline claimed that the chief had voluntarily resigned until he took his situation to the press, causing a media furor. Cho and Korean Air were heavily criticized, and in the aftermath Cho resigned from one of her several executive positions at Korean Air. She was subsequently found guilty in a South Korean court of obstructing aviation safety. The flight attendant and cabin crew chief returned to their positions by April 2016.

Korean Air executive Cho Hyun-min, another daughter of the company chairman, allegedly sprayed water on company's employees, and in March 2018 the allegations of yelling and spraying water on an advertising agent caused rising controversy. When concerns over Cho's behavior became widespread, Korean Air explained, "It is true that during the meeting, the water rose and splashed when the bucket fell on the floor, but it did not spray water on the staff".

Cho apologized for her behavior. This incident caused international media to start using the word gapjil.

In a similar incident in December 2018, a Korean Air pilot attempted to take a glass of champagne and was blocked by the cabin crew chief, again demanding a cup of wine from cabin crew later on during the flight to Amsterdam—in violation of generally very strict rules in the flight industry prohibiting alcohol consumption by pilots. The airline gave only a mild reprimand to the captain, but demoted the cabin crew chief who rebuffed him and reported the incident.

=== Push-driven distribution gapjil ===
'Push-driven distribution gapjil' is a type of gapjil where large corporations make pressing delivery (or supply) demands to small businesses (franchises).

==== Namyang Dairy Products Corporation high-pressure sales to franchises scandal ====
In May 2013, Namyang Co. was criticised following an accusation that the firm had pressed local franchises to buy products for a long time, as well as a tape-recording of rough words to local owners. Namyang Co. caused more than 20 billion won (about 18,000,000 USD at the time) worth of damage through illegal activities—such as high-pressure sales and shifting wages of salesmen to local franchises—for the past seven years, for which the Seoul Central District Court convicted it in January 2014. There was also a boycott against Namyang Corporation.

==== Hyundai Mobis high-pressure sales scandal ====
In September 2017, Hyundai Mobis was suspected of pressure to achieve sales goals and forced sales by 1600 branches of local maintenance shops from January 2010 to November 2013. The manager of the local shops was pressed to buy unnecessary parts of an automobile under the description of "Random Sales" and "Negotiated Sales" in order to achieve the goal of the head office. Hyundai Mobis admitted carrying out these acts and since then has been establishing a plan to ensure they do not reoccur.

=== Passion-pay ===
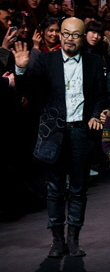
Lie Sang Bong

Passion-pay is a type of labour extortion where a business or enterprise pays less than minimum wage, or even nothing, for the labor of young job seekers on the excuse that the position will be prestigious or advantageous.

==== Lie Sang Bong Design Studio's passion-pay scandal ====
In January 2015, Lie Sang Bong design studio, which is managed by Korean fashion designer Lie Sang Bong, was embroiled in controversy about passion-pay. Although the studio imposed excessive workloads on workers, the studio offered relatively low wages: 100,000 won (about 92 USD at the time) for apprentices, 300,000 won (about 276 USD) for interns and 1,100,000 won (1,012 USD) for regular workers. After the controversy, Lie Sang Bong said "I deeply apologized to the youths of the fashion industry who get hurt with working environment and treatment, and I'll try to improve the overall problem of the fashion industry in this opportunity".

==== Jo Min-ah's Bakery's "Meal instead pay" ====
In January 2015 "The Space Goddess Jo Min-ah's Bakery", run by a former member of K-Pop band Jewelry, posted a job offer at 5,500 won per hour, less than the legal minimum hourly wage of 5,580 won.

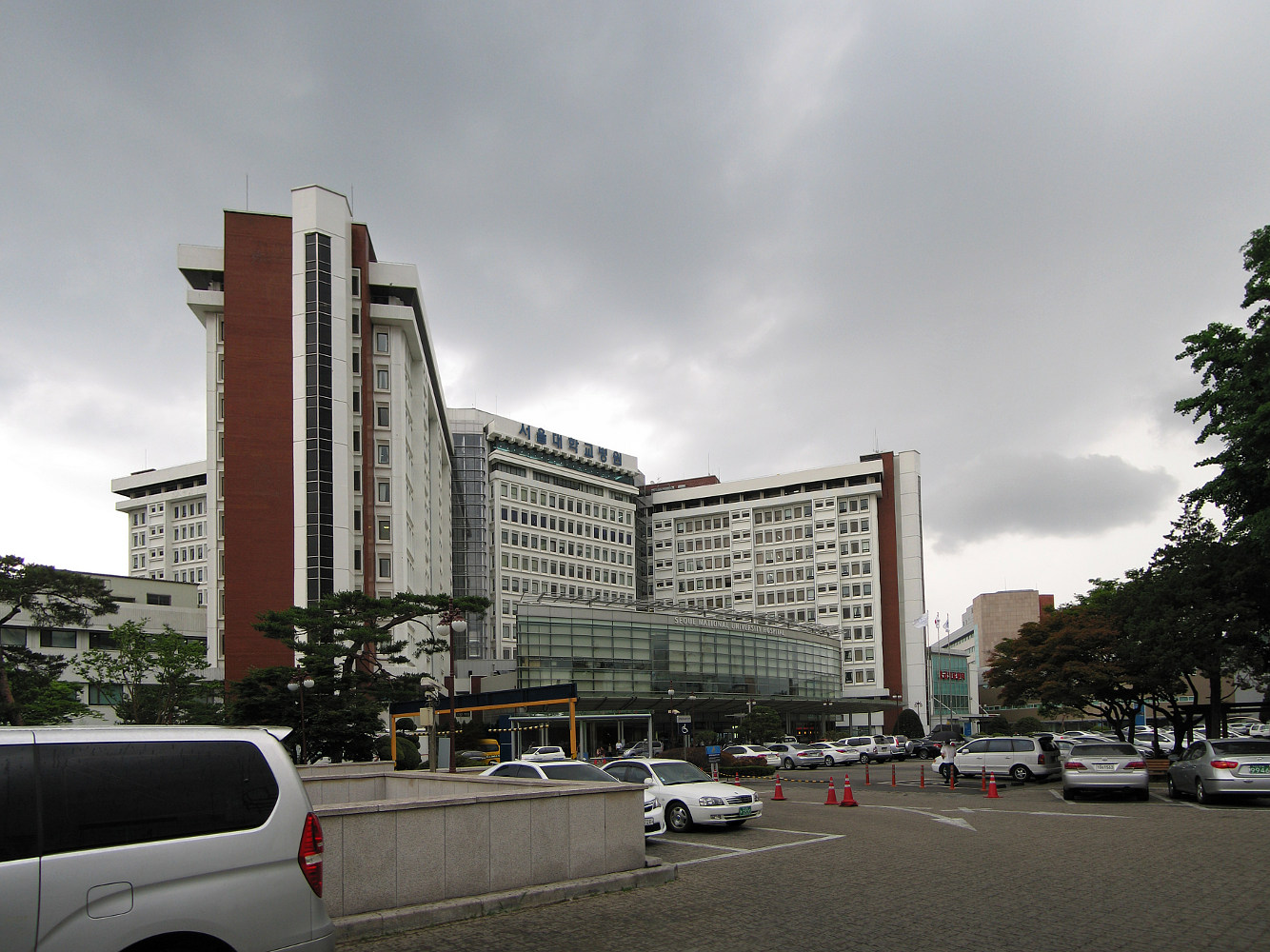
Seoul National University Hospital

==== Seoul National University Hospital nurse passion-pay scandal ====
In September 2017, Seoul National University Hospital (SNUH) was in a controversy because it had inflicted passion-pay on newly graduated nurses for five years since 2012, for a "probationary education period". It turned out that SNUH only paid 360,000 won (about 324 USD at the time) for 24 days work to 1,212 nurses in their period of education. Based on an eight hour working day, the sum of 360,000 won is equivalent to an hourly rate of 1,800 won (about 1.62 USD), which is far below the minimum wage of 6,470 won (about 5.82 USD). The hospital explained that they did not know whether they should pay full wages during the training session. In addition, they plan to provide retroactive payment to nurses under three years, which is a period appointed by the recent labor standard law.

== Social responses ==
=== Boycott ===
Boycott can be defined as a movement of consumers' refusal to buy a particular item in order to accomplish a specific purpose.

Unlike gapjil (which is a structural problem between 'Gap' and 'Eul', like the franchise-maker and the retailer), the boycott campaign showed that it can explode instantly when the problem touches consumer's feelings. This is because consumers think that not consuming products of gapjil firms is the best thing they can do. This movement suggests that the gapjil of company owners or executives is becoming a 'self-harm' activity which decreases corporate profits. Experts emphasize that in order to reduce corporate ethical problems, such as gapjil, consumers need to change their perception as a consumer in a larger frame of mind. Corporations will be changed when consumer involvement such as resentment at gapjil and boycott is increased. A consumer movement group staged boycott campaigns and received favourable responses from consumers, but there has not yet been a massive and organised boycott.

=== 24-hour call center for reporting damages by gapjil ===
On 11 April 2016, the Korean civil society organisation Public Welfare Committee (PWC) opened a 24-hour call centre for reporting gapjil damages and behavior. It is operated for rooting out irregular practices. PWC explained that the purpose of the call center was to prevent gapjil behavior, which is prevalent in South Korean society, and to conduct criminal and civil measures through case verification.

== Governmental responses ==
=== Investigation of gapjil ===
After Kim Sang-jo was inaugurated as chairperson of the Korean Fair Trade Commission (FTC), the FTC started an investigation of all industrial head offices and franchises to resolve all gapjil cases in four major areas: distribution, affiliate, subcontract, and franchise.

Beginning 10 August 2017, the FTC began investigating the transactions between headquarters and agencies, which targeted about 4,800 headquarters, 70 franchises, and groups of franchises in all domestic industries. The investigation was conducted as a survey targeting the headquarters between August and September, and since then targeted the franchises and groups of franchises from September to December. The FTC said the purpose of the investigation was to secure basic data to prevent unfair trade practices between headquarters and franchises, in order to prepare policies and improve the system.

=== Ombudsman ===
In July 2017, the FTC established an ombudsman for permanent surveillance of protection measures about franchises. The ombudsman was organised with former and current merchants with experience in franchise trading and 13 members of the FTC. They planned to expand the members to 30, including wholesale, retail, and service sectors. The ombudsman regularly monitors trading practices in franchise sectors and reports to the FTC when signs of unfair trade are detected. In addition, they state their opinion in policy enforcement, and they suggest ideas to improve the system by collecting problems information on the field.

=== Unfair damage counseling center in Seoul ===
For the first time in local government, the Seoul Metropolitan Government started to eradicate unfair practices in the franchise industry, declaring, "2016 economic democratisation city, Seoul". The Seoul Metropolitan Government has operated an unfair damage counselling centre, where anyone who suffered from unfair damages can report their case through the member's office.

Not only the franchiser who is operating the franchise but also an ex-franchiser and groups of franchisers can report unfair cases of members. When the report is received, first, the government identifies the exact facts of the incident through an in-depth consultation with the franchiser who reported the incident, then meets with a group of franchisers. According to the issue, the government recommends to the headquarters of the franchise a voluntary corrective action or handles arrangements. Depending on the degree of violation of the law, the investigation request to the FTC or the prosecution are reviewed.

== Media responses ==
In December 2014, the nut rage incident was covered by numerous international media, and gapjil reached a level of global prominence. In February 2015, the Reuters news agency reported about Korean gapjil culture and the judgement of the nut rage incident. The article suggested that Korean gapjil originates in the traditional vertical hierarchy in Korean society. In May 2015, British newspaper The Independent reported on the No-Look Pass issue of Korean politician Kim Moo-sung, and pointed out that most gapjil is committed by Korean adult men in positions of authority, especially middle-aged men.

== See also ==
- Power (social and political)
- Power harassment
- Abuse of power
- Rankism
