= Sentimiento (song) =

Single by Anasol

from the album Anasol
- Released: 2005
- Recorded: 2004
- Genre: Electropop
- Length: 4:18
- Label: Universal Latin
- Songwriters: Anasol Escobar, David Cardenas
- Producer: Luis Fernando Ochoa

Anasol singles chronology
"Amantes Invisibles" (2003)	"Sentimiento" (2005)	"Nace" (2006)

"Sentimiento" (English: "Feeling") is a song by the Colombian pop and electronic singer-songwriter Anasol. The song was released in 2005 as the first single from her third studio album, Anasol (2005). It was written, produced and recorded by Anasol and David Cardenas, and the music video was directed by Gustavo Garzon.

== Video ==
The music video shows Anasol in what seems to be a night club crowded with teenagers. It is performed by Anasol in various places, angles and positions while she dances along. The music video was directed by the Argentine music video director Gustavo Garzón and first shown in May 2005.

== Track listings ==
CD single

1. "Sentimiento (Album Version)"
2. "Sentimiento (Club Remix)"
3. "Sentimeinto (Club Remix Extended)"

== Chart performance ==
Chart (2005)	Peak position
U.S. Latin Pop Airplay (Billboard)	31
