= Sol Escobar =

Colombian singer

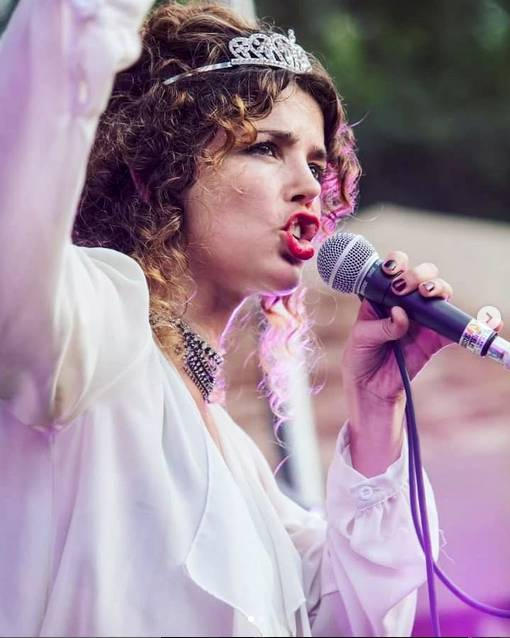
- Sol Escobar opening for Yann Tiersen Spain 2017 at Jardín de Pedralbes Music Festival

Background information
- Also known as: Sol Escobar, Anasol
- Born: Ana Sol Escobar; November 5, 1976 (age 50); Buenos Aires, Argentina
- Origin: Cali, Colombia
- Genres: Latin folk, Latin Pop, Latin Jazz, Soul, Electropop
- Occupations: Singer-songwriter, musician, record producer, actress
- Instruments: Vocals, guitar, piano
- Years active: 1999–present
- Labels: Sony Music, Univision, Universal Music
- Website: http://www.solescobar.com

Sol Escobar (born Ana Sol Escobar; 5 November 1976), previously known professionally as Anasol, is a Colombian-Argentine folk-latin singer-songwriter.

== Early life and education ==
Escobar was born in Buenos Aires, Argentina in 1976 to Colombian parents. She began formal dance instruction at the age of five. She spent most of her childhood in between, Colombia, Argentina, Spain and the U.S. In her teens she spent most of the time in Colombia but spent one year in Florida. She studied music at Universidad Javeriana of Bogotá. Colombia, with an emphasis in music production and sound engineering. She completed a diploma degree in screenwriting for cinema and television at Blackmaria.

== Career ==
=== As Sol Escobar (2026–present) ===
Escobar performs as Sol Escobar, fusing Latin folk with soul, pop, and jazz. Her songwriting frequently incorporates gothic imagery and themes of astrology. In April 2026, she released the studio album De Padre: Soñadora, featuring eight tracks entirely written, produced, and visually directed by Escobar.

Her single "Disparo", from her previous album La Dama Oscura, was featured on the official soundtrack of the HBO Max film Del Otro Lado del Jardín. La Dama Oscura also earned Escobar a nomination at the MIN Awards (Premios MIN), Spain's leading independent music awards. Her single "Ese Amor" was included in the soundtrack of the film Brizna, which was selected for the Cartagena International Film Festival.

Escobar has performed at international music festivals, including Oslo World (Norway), BIME City (Bilbao), Noches del Botánico (Madrid), Arrecife de las Músicas (Canary Islands), LAMC (New York), WOMAD (Gran Canaria), Festival América Late at Casa de América (Madrid), and Mas i Mas (Barcelona). She has served as the opening act for Fito Páez during his "Ciudad Liberada Tour" in Colombia, as well as for Yann Tiersen in Spain.

Her collaborative work includes the single "La Mariposa y el Farolero" with Manuel García, "Overflowing" with Monsieur Shwill, and a Catalan-language version of Los Planetas' "Brigitte, encara ací" with Verdcel.

=== As Anasol (1999–2006) ===
In 1999, using the artistic name Anasol, she released her debut studio album Escorpión de Primavera (Scorpion of Spring). The leading single, "Pensando en Desorden", reached the top 10 charts in Colombia.

Anasol's second studio album, Astros, was released in 2002 under Sony Music Colombia and produced by Luis Fernando Ochoa. The album achieved commercial success in Colombia, being certified gold during its first week of sales and subsequently reaching platinum status. Three singles were released to promote the record: "Sin Miedo A Caer" (August 2002), "Voy volando", and "Amantes Invisibles".

Her self-titled third studio album, Anasol, was released in 2005 through Univision Records, comprising 11 tracks and a bonus dance mix of the single "Sentimiento", which peaked at number 31 on the Billboard Hot Latin Songs chart.

== Discography ==
=== Studio albums ===
- De Padre: Soñadora (2026)
- La Dama Oscura (2018)
- Anasol (2005)
- Astros (2002)
- Escorpión de Primavera (1999)

=== Singles and collaborations ===
- "Amor Vampiro" (2026)
- "Lion Is Out" (with Antonio Grande Ensemble) (2025)
- "Khala" (2025)
- "Ave Rapaz" (with Joan Chamorro) (2025)
- "Mujer Unicornio" (2025)
- "Matria" (2022)
- "Brigitte, encara ací" (with VerdCel) (2022)
- "La Mariposa y el Farolero" (with Manuel García) (2020)
- "Overflowing" (with Monsieur Shwill) (2020)
- "Disparo" (2018)
- "Pajaro Negro" (2018)
- "Ese amor" (2016)
- "Nace" (2006)
- "Sentimiento" (2005) – Billboard Hot Latin Songs no. 31
- "Búscame" (2003)
- "Voy volando" (2002)
- "Sin Miedo A Caer" (2002)
- "No Dejes...no dejes" (1999)
- "Pensando en Desorden" (1999)
