= Astros (album) =

Studio album by Anasol
- Released: 21 June 2002
- Recorded: 2001–2002
- Genre: Latin pop, electropop, acoustic, adult contemporary
- Length: 48:42
- Label: Columbia
- Producer: Anasol, Luis Fernando Ochoa

Anasol chronology
Escorpión de Primavera (1999)	Astros (2002)	Anasol (2005)

Singles from Astros
- 1. "Sin Miedo a Caer" Released: 2002; 2. "Voy Volando" Released: 2002; 3. "Búscame" Released: 2003

Astros (English: Stars) is the second studio album by Colombian singer-songwriter Anasol, released on 21 June 2002 by Sony Music Colombia.

== Track listing ==
All tracks are written by Anasol; except where indicated.

No.	Title	Writer(s)	Length
1.	"Sin Miedo a Caer"	Anasol Escobar, Luis Fernando Ochoa	3:42
2.	"Voy Volando"		3:35
3.	"Estés Dónde Estés"		4:07
4.	"Gracias"		3:38
5.	"Astros"		3:18
6.	"Amantes invisibles"	Anasol Escobar, Luis Fernando Ochoa	4:14
7.	"Buscame"	Anasol Escobar, Luis Fernando Ochoa	4:01
8.	"Despierta"		3:59
9.	"Si No Llego"	Anasol Escobar, Luis Fernando Ochoa	3:53
10.	"Siluetas"		3:07
11.	"Pensando En Desorden (Second Version)"		4:30
12.	"Del Otro Lado"		1:57
