= Anasol (album) =

Studio album by Anasol
- Released: August 30, 2005
- Genres: Latin Pop, electropop
- Labels: Universal Records; Univision
- Producers: Anasol, Luis Fernando Ochoa, David Cardenas

Anasol chronology
Astros (2002)	Anasol (2005)	La Dama Escobar (2017)

Singles from Anasol
- 1. "Sentimiento" Released: 2005; 2. "Nace" Released: 2006

Professional ratings
Review scores
Source	Rating
AllMusic	3/5 stars

Anasol is the third album by Colombian pop singer Anasol.

The album was released on August 30, 2005. The album contains 12 songs, including her first hit single "Sentimiento", which reached number 31 on the Billboard Hot Latin Songs chart.

== Track listing ==
All songs written by Anasol Escobar, except where noted.

1. "Sentimiento" – 4:18
2. "Nace" – 3:57
3. "Sube el Alma" (Escobar, Luis Fernando Ochoa) – 3:30
4. "Dame" (Escobar, Ochoa) – 3:28
5. "Sin Miedo a Caer" (Escobar, Ochoa) – 3:40
6. "Amantes Invisibles" (Escobar, Ochoa) – 4:17
7. "Voy Volando" – 3:36
8. "Buscame" (Escobar, Ochoa) – 3:36
9. "Siluetas" – 3:11
10. "Astros" – 3:17
11. "Si No Llego" (Escobar, Ochoa) – 3:54
12. "Sentimiento" (Club Mix) – 7:51
