= Amarilis =

Amarilis may refer to:

== People ==
- Amarilis (poet), a 16th-century Peruvian poet
- Amarilis (actress), an American actor
- Amarilis Fuentes, an Ecuadorean teacher and suffragist
- Amarilis Savón, a Cuban judoka
- Amarilis de Varennes, a Portuguese professor
- Amarilis Villar, a Venezuelan volleyball player

== Places ==
- Amarilis District, a district in Huánuco, Peru

== See also ==
- Amaryllis, a genus of flowering bulbs
