= Waking Dream =

2002 book by Rhiannon Lassiter

- First edition cover
- Author: Rhiannon Lassiter
- Language: English
- Genre: Young adult fantasy
- Publisher: Pan Macmillan
- Publication date: 5 July 2002
- Publication place: United Kingdom
- Media type: Print
- Pages: 312
- ISBN: 0-333-96007-6

Waking Dream is a young adult novel by Rhiannon Lassiter, first published in 2002. It is a dark fantasy about magic, dreams and another world.

== Plot summary ==
While attending the reading of her father's will with her mother and stepfather, Bethany meets her cousin Poppy, a spoiled girl who is believed to have magic powers. Bethany is left a mysterious painting in the will; it does not look like a piece he would normally paint. Bethany is unwillingly sent to stay at Poppy's house for the summer. A strange boy called Rivalaun turns up, claiming to be Bethany and Poppy's cousin.

Later on in the book, Poppy gets fed up with all the lies and secrets, so she steals Bethany's painting from her room and paints it on her wall. Poppy uses some kind of magic so that she can walk through into the world of the painting: a world of dreams. Rivalaun and Bethany follow to rescue her. They then cannot get back to the normal world unless they complete a quest.

== Characters ==
- Bethany- the protagonist
- Poppy- Bethany's cousin
- Rivalaun- Bethany and Poppy's cousin
- Ceily- Bethany's mother
- David- Bethany's stepfather
- Emily- Poppy's mother
- Sylver- Poppy's father
- Daanan- Rivalaun's father
