= Milk round =

Annual job recruitment of UK college students

The milkround in the UK is a period, typically between October and February, of companies touring universities each year to advertise their companies and recruit students as employees.

The website Milkround is an online version of this practice.

== Etymology ==
Home milk delivery is a long-standing practice in Great Britain. So, in the mid-1960s, when companies began touring universities to promote and advertise their job opportunities directly to candidates, the visits became known informally as "the milk round".

== History ==
Milk rounds were purported to have been promoted initially by Unigate Dairies as their formal recruitment programme for graduates; it grew organically by the association of other recruiters as they happened to do the same thing at the same time. As each University (there were few then) held its Careers Fair, the same recruitment teams toured each one, there was no coordinated effort, but that the fairs were held over a period of time permitted all recruiters to visit all universities. It wasn't a central resource, but it was a seasonal habit of the firms with significant graduate recruitment policies.

Often the recruiters are large organisations with specific graduate training schemes, designed to train graduates and expose them to as many aspects of the business as possible, often over a number of years. In many cases the initial training scheme involves mentoring by a more senior member of the organisation.

The milk round is not managed by a central organisation, but each university careers service usually provides services to assist their students with company research, job applications and careers advice. Careers services also liaise with companies, to prevent clashes and help advertise the events.

=== Move online ===
Since the late 1990s, activity generally associated with the milk round has moved online with the creation of web-based graduate job boards, CV databases and agencies. These websites perform many of the functions of the traditional milk round. Graduates can apply for specific jobs and compare different graduate training schemes. Web-based job boards overcome one of the major disadvantages of the traditional milkround; namely that students attending universities not visited by a recruiter's milkround can still gain access to that recruiter's jobs.

== See also ==
- Graduate recruitment
