= Rhiannon Lassiter =

British children's books author

- Born: 1977 (age 48–49); London
- Occupation: Novelist
- Relatives: Mary Hoffman (mother)
- Writing career
- Genre: Young adult fiction
- Notable works: Hex, Bad Blood
- Website: www.rhiannonlassiter.com

Rhiannon Lassiter (born February 1977) is a British children's books author.

== Biography ==
Rhiannon Lassiter was born on 9 February 1977 in London to children's books author Mary Hoffman and Stephen Barber.

She started writing the first book of the Hex trilogy, set in a totalitarian futuristic Europe, when she was seventeen, and sent the first chapters to Douglas Hill (a friend of the family) and Pat White (her mother's agent). She was stunned when Pat wrote back saying that she loved it and would like to represent Rhiannon and Douglas said she should send it to his editor, Marion Lloyd, at Macmillan. Macmillan accepted the first two Hex books shortly after her nineteenth birthday.

As well as writing she also runs her own web-design business, writes articles and reviews of children's books and is part of the production team of Armadillo, her mother's children's books review publication.

== Selected works ==
=== Books ===
- Hex (1998)
- Hex: Shadows (1999)
- The Supernatural (1999)
- Hex: Ghosts (2000)
- Waking Dream (2002)
- Rights of Passage: Borderland (June 2003)
- Lines in the Sand (June 2003)
- Rights of Passage: Outland (October 2004)
- Rights of Passage: Shadowland (January 2005)
- Super Zeroes (July 2005)
- Roundabout (2006)
- Bad Blood (August 2007)
- Ghost of a Chance (2010)
- Little Witches Bewitched (2013)

=== Short stories ===
- White Walls (1997)
- Walking the Wire (1999)

== See also ==
- Rhiannon Lassiter's home page
- Interview of Rhiannon Lassiter by ACHUKA—Children's Books UK
