= Armadillo (magazine) =

- Editor-in-Chief: Louise Ellis-Barrett
- Former editors: Mary Hoffman
- Categories: Children's literature
- Frequency: Quarterly
- Format: Web-based
- Circulation: Worldwide
- Founder: Mary Hoffman
- Founded: 1999
- Final issue: 2004
- Country: United Kingdom
- Language: English
- Website: www.armadillomagazine.co.uk

Armadillo is a web-based magazine currently owned and edited by Louise Ellis-Barrett. It was founded in 1999 by Mary Hoffman and her daughter Rhiannon Lassiter.

The magazine is hosted online and the web editor is Simon Barrett. Sarah Lovett is the current (2021) illustrations editor and Jess Zara the Blog editor.

Its purpose is to promote children's books through reviews and articles, many of which are contributed by children’s authors and illustrators. Reviewers include children's librarians and many people who have experience in the publishing world. The magazine has grown in recent years to include event reports, special features and competitions, generously supported by publishers.

Armadillo was founded in 1999 as a print-based magazine, but moved to its current web-based format in 2004. Initially readership was by subscription, but in September 2007 the decision was taken to allow free access; Armadillo is now funded by donations. It is published quarterly in March, June, September and December.

Armadillo aims to be an independent voice promoting children's literature to children and adults. It is supported by daily Instagram and Twitter posts as well as a weekly Blog to which Louise Ellis-Barrett, her team and guests contribute reviews, event reports, feature author exclusives, and author tours.
