= Stravaganza (series) =

Series of novels by Mary Hoffman

- City of Masks; City of Stars; City of Flowers; City of Secrets; City of Ships; City of Swords
- Author: Mary Hoffman
- Country: United Kingdom
- Language: English
- Genre: Fantasy, young adult fiction
- Publisher: Bloomsbury
- Published: 2002–2012
- Media type: Print
- No. of books: 6

Stravaganza is a series of novels written by children's author Mary Hoffman. The books are set alternatively between Islington, an area of London, England, and various cities in Talia, an alternate version of Renaissance Italy.

The series originally consisted of a trilogy of books: City of Masks, City of Stars, and City of Flowers. The popularity of the trilogy allowed the series to be extended for three more books: City of Secrets, City of Ships, and City of Swords.

== Inspiration and Development ==
Mary Hoffman was originally inspired to write the Stravaganza series after a family trip to Venice and an incident involving a gondola ride. The subsequent books developed from the original idea. The country of Talia reflects Hoffman's own imagining of what Italy is like. Further inspiration of the settings for each of the books came from Hoffman's regular trips to Italy.

Though the series was intended to be a trilogy, it was later expanded into six books. For continuing the series, the fourth book in the series, City of Secrets, derived from the theme of secrets and knowledge while continuing on the open-ended plot at the end of City of Flowers, where Luciano Crinamorte is due to attend university in the city of Padavia. Each book in the series introduces a new protagonist as a Stravagante, a traveler between England and the parallel world of Talia, while maintaining previously introduced characters as part of the supporting cast.

== Setting ==
The Stravaganza series is primarily set in Talia, which is based on Italy during the Renaissance in the 16th century. Most notably, the primary antagonists in the series, the di Chimici family, were inspired by the de Medici family. In the series, it is established that a number of differences exist between Talia and Italy in the 16th century in both historical, religious, and scientific ways.

The existence of Talia parallels the contemporary 21st century world of England, which serves as a secondary setting and the origin of the protagonists of each book in the series. Individuals capable of moving between worlds are known as Stravaganti; a Stravagante's ability to move between worlds is facilitated by a talisman, an object that originally came from the world opposite to the traveler's own world.

The country of Talia comprises twelve city-states, each which have their own equivalents in this world, and appellations referring a unique quality of the city. Half of these city-states are under the political control of members of the di Chimici family, whose strongholds lie in Giglia and in Remora, which is also home to a di Chimici Pope. The few cities which remain outside di Chimici control are either still negotiating political treaties with the di Chimici (Montemurato), or remain independent (Bellezza, Classe, Romula, Padavia, and Cittanuova).

=== City-States ===
Talian City State	Title	Italian Equivalent
Bellezza	City of Masks	Venice
Montemurato	City of Towers	Monteriggioni
Padavia	City of Secrets	Padua
Volana	City of Music	Ferrara
Bellona	City of Dreams	Bologna
Fortezza	City of Swords	Lucca
Classe	City of Ships	Ravenna
Giglia	City of Flowers	Florence
Moresco	City of Mermaids	Pisa
Remora	City of Stars	Siena
Romula	City of Dragons	Rome
Cittanuova	City of Fire	Naples

== Stravaganza Publications ==
=== City of Masks ===
Lucien Mulholland, a teenager recovering from chemotherapy, is given a red and purple marbled notebook by his father so that Lucien can write in it since Lucien's throat hurts. When he falls asleep holding the book, he wakes up in the enchanting Bellezza, a Renaissance Venice-like city in the country of Talia (which resembles Renaissance Italy), ruled by a beautiful and imperious Duchessa. Here he meets the adventurous Arianna Gasparini and the mysterious Rodolfo Rossi. Rodolfo is a Stravagante, a traveller of a secret order who can move between Lucien's world and Rodolfo's by use of a talisman (an object from the other's world). However, Bellezza for all its beauty also has many dangers, especially for those who become close to the Duchessa.

=== City of Stars ===
Georgia O'Grady is a girl who is frequently bullied by her stepbrother, Russell. Her only escape is to go horse riding. When she falls asleep holding a miniature winged horse figurine, she wakes up in a stable in Talia in the city of Remora (Renaissance Siena), a city divided in twelve sections for each of the signs of the western zodiac. Here, she meets the Montalbani family, which includes the Horsemaster Paolo and his son Cesare. Paolo, like Rodolfo, is a Stravagante and reveals to Georgia (who is mistaken initially for a boy and retains this as a disguise throughout the book, her name is Giorgio) that she has come at a very important time: a horse race known as the Stellata is about to take place. The Twelfth of the Ram, which holds ties to the city of Bellezza and is the twelfth of the Montalbanis, has not won the race in twenty-five years. The Twelfth place their hopes in the birth of a special horse in the Twelfth of the Ram, one that may actually bring about the luck the twelfth needs to break their losing streak.

The di Chimici family (antagonists in the first book) intend them to lose again to prove to the new Duchessa of Bellezza, Arianna Rossi (formerly Arianna Gasparini), and her father, Rodolfo, the advantages of joining their alliance by marrying Gaetano di Chimici, the homely but charming third son of the head of the family, Duke Niccolo of Giglia. Gaetano, while willing to submit to his father's ambitions, would rather study and is more concerned about the well-being of his younger brother, Falco, who was crippled in a riding accident.

Lucien, the protagonist of the first book, now known as Luciano and living as a full-time resident of Bellezza — as well as other important supporting characters, such as Silvia (the old Duchessa), Rodolfo, and Arianna, appear again.

=== City of Flowers ===
Sky Meadows, a teenager whose mother is recovering from a longtime illness, is shy and reclusive, partly because he feels he needs to protect his mother, and doesn't seem to have the nerve to tell the girl he likes how he feels (mostly because she has a pair of rather familiar tough looking friends, a girl with tiger-striped red hair and the school's fencing champion). Everything changes when Sky finds a blue perfume bottle and falls asleep with it in his hand. He awakes in Giglia (the Talian version of Florence) where the pharmacist-friar and Stravagante Sulien is waiting for him. Sky, given the name Celestino Pascoli, finds himself embroiled in a world of art and intrigue as the di Chimici family prepares for four weddings. Once again Bellezza's young Duchessa becomes involved as she has been invited as a guest by Gaetano di Chimici, one of the grooms and a personal friend of hers, and also to commission a statue of her sculpted by the great Giuditta Miele, another Stravagante.

Meanwhile, the di Chimici family and its rival, the Nucci family, have reached a point in their age old blood feud where the flood gates are about to open.

Luciano, Arianna, Georgia, Falco di Chimici (now Nicholas Duke, foster-son of the Mulhollands), and other important characters from the previous books appear again, such as Silvia, and Rodolfo.

=== City of Secrets ===
The City of Secrets continues the story of Luciano and Arianna as Luciano goes to study at a university in Padavia (the Talian version of Padua). Another Stravagante from the modern world appears, a dyslexic but extremely intelligent young man named Matt, whose talisman happens to be a book. Transported to the Scriptorium of Padavia University, where Matt works as a printer of forbidden texts under the guidance of the Stravagante Constantin, who is known amongst the public as a professor of Rhetoric at the university.

During his visits, Matt meets Luciano, who is studying at the university, and Arianna, who is secretly visiting Luciano while disguised as a boy. However, insecurities regarding his ability to read puts on a strain on Matt's life and the discovery of other Stravaganti in his world result in more trouble than Matt can deal with.

Meanwhile, the di Chimici continue their attempts to unify northern Talia under their rule and attempt to convince the ruler of Padavia to enforce new rules against occult practices that the di Chimici will hope to single out the Stravaganti. Both Matt and Luciano, who remains the object of the di Chimici grudge after the death of Duke Niccolò, find themselves in terrible peril, especially as the di Chimici are verge of making a dangerous breakthrough into the modern world.

=== City of Ships ===
Isabel, nicknamed "Bel", is the younger twin by ten minutes and has spent her entire life in the shadow of her brother Charlie, who is naturally more talented than she is at anything and is genuinely nice. Unable to compare to her brother, Isabel avoids drawing attention to herself and concentrates on her only unique talent: art. However, when she is transported to the Talian city of Classe (the Talian version of Ravenna) with a tesserae mosaic fragment, she finds herself in a world with mosaics, pirates, and traders. As the city prepares for an attack from the Gate people from the east, Isabel finds that she is a crucial element for defending the city and realizes the opportunity to finally find her true strengths and impress her brother.

=== City of Swords ===
Desperately unhappy, Laura has resorted to secretly self-harming. But Laura is a Stravagante, somebody who can travel in time and space. When she finds her talisman, a small silver dagger, she stravagates with it to sixteenth-century Fortezza, a town similar to Lucca in Italy, where she meets her Stravagante, who is a swordsmith. But Laura also meets the charming and attractive Ludo, and falls for him. Their love for each other is tested when Ludo lays claim to the crown of Fortezza, and Laura finds herself fighting on the side of the Stravaganti opposing him.

== Characters ==
Characters are grouped according to geographical association, either by the city-state they are primarily associated with or where the character's first appearance in the series occurred.

=== Bellezza ===
Lucien Mulholland (Luciano Crinamorte)

The protagonist of City of Masks, Lucien is recovering from cancer when he receives his talisman, a marbled notebook from his father. Upon traveling to Bellezza, he becomes a close friend of Arianna Gasparini and apprenticed to the Stravaganti, Rodolfo Rossi. With his arrival in the city, he soon becomes involved with more political matters relating to Silvia, the imperious Duchessa of Bellezza, whom he saves from assassination. This act later earns him the title of "Cavaliere", a kind of knight. However, his involvement in Bellezza's affairs cause him to be kidnapped for a long time (in the climax of City of Masks). As in his other world he seems to be in a coma without any brain activity, he dies there and is forced to live his whole life in Talia. He plays a key supporting role in subsequent books, and proposes to Arianna Rossi in City of Flowers.

Arianna Gasparini (Arianna Rossi)

The heroine of the City of Masks, Arianna is a spirited and strong-willed girl who seeks adventure beyond the lagoon islands where she was raised. Known as the Figlia del’Isola (Daughter of the Island), she is supposedly the only child to be born on the island of Torrone for 20 years and has been treasured and spoiled by her family and the islanders. In City of Masks, she wishes to become a mandolier, a job only done by young men, but her plan to become one goes awry when Lucien appears in Bellezza and she is forced to discard her disguise to save his life. The two eventually become friends and she is his guide in the city. Arianna's true heritage is later revealed when the di Chimici attempt to use her against the Duchessa; she is actually the daughter of the Duchessa and Rodolfo and was adopted by the Duchessa's older sister, Valeria, and husband, Gianfranco, the curator of a museum on Torrone. At the end of City of Masks, she becomes the new Duchessa of Bellezza. She continues to play a key secondary role in subsequent books, eventually becoming Luciano's fiancée, and later wife, and disguising herself as the youth "Adamo" while visiting Luciano at University in Padavia. She becomes engaged to Luciano in the City of Flowers.

Rodolfo Rossi

Lucien's master and a powerful Stravagante. Rodolfo is a well-respected and distinguished citizen of Bellezza as a scientist and Senator as well as a close confidante and lover of the Duchessa. He is kind and understanding, but can appear serious and intimidating. He has two older brothers, Fiorentino and Edigio, and is later revealed to be Arianna's father and acts as her regent when she becomes Duchessa. Rodolfo plays a key supporting role in all the Stravaganza books.

Silvia Bellini (Silvia Rossi)

The beautiful and imperious Duchessa of Bellezza for twenty-five years. Beloved by all of Bellezza, she is extremely strong willed, dangerous to her enemies, and loyal to her friends. While she has had a number of lovers in her life, she takes a shine to Rodolfo and sends him to university; when he returned an established scholar, he becomes her sole lover and the father of her secret child, Arianna, though he did not find out about her for fifteen years. After a near successful assassination attempt, Silvia decides not to reveal the truth and arranges for her daughter to become her successor. She moves to Padavia under the guise of a wealthy widow and lives with her loyal maid, Susanna, and a devoted reformed assassin, Guido Parola. She visits Rodolfo and Arianna whenever she has a chance and plays a supporting role in the City of Stars and City of Flowers; she eventually openly marries Rodolfo and returns to Bellezza as Arianna's stepmother, continuing to advise her daughter on statecraft.

William Dethridge (Gugliemo Crinamorte)

The first Stravagante, an alchemist from the Elizabethan era. He first arrived in Bellona, but relocated to Montemurato when he "translated" and then to Bellezza. Eventually becomes foster-father to Luciano and marries Leonora Gasparini, the widowed sister-in-law of Arianna's adopted father Gianfranco. In Talia, he is an astronomer and natural philosopher.

Leonora Gasparini (Leonora Crinamorte)

Arianna's aunt, the widowed sister-in-law of Arianna's foster father, Gianfranco. After Arianna's failed attempt to become a mandolier, her foster-parents send her to live with Leonora in hopes of satisfying Arianna's desire to live in Bellezza. Leonora marries Dr. Dethridge at the end of City of Masks and becomes Luciano's foster mother.

=== Remora ===
Georgia O'Grady

The protagonist of City of Stars, Georgia is a withdrawn girl who lives with her mother Maura, stepfather Ralph, and an abusive stepbrother Russell. She loves riding horses and obtains a small winged horse sculpture from an antique shop, which turns out to be a talisman. She arrives in the city of Remora and becomes involved in the Stellata, a significant horse race, as well as developing a complicated friendship with Falco di Chimici, a crippled prince of the most powerful family in Talia. Because of her unfeminine features, Georgia is mistaken as a boy and ends up accepting the name "Giorgio Gredi" as a disguise in Talia. She plays a supporting role in subsequent books, becoming more confident and taking on a more feminine appearance.

Paolo Montalbani

The Horsemaster for the Twelfth of the Ram in Remora, Paolo is Stravagante in Remora. He is the last victorious winner of the Stellata from the Twelfth of the Ram. He is Cesare's father and is married to Teresa and the father of three little girls and twin boys with her. In addition to becoming Georgia's mentor, he becomes a surrogate father-figure and tries to help her with her troubling family situation.

Cesare Montalbani

The oldest son of the horsemaster of the Twelfth of the Ram in Remora, Cesare is not a Stravagante, though is aware of their existence. A humble and passionate young man who is fond of his stepmother and half-siblings, he becomes Georgia's guide to Remora and becomes quite fond of her. A superb horseman, he is the rider chosen by the Twelfth to compete in the Stellata and carries all of the Ram's hopes for a victory after nearly twenty years. He eventually attends university in Padavia with Luciano.

Falco di Chimici (Nicholas "Nick" Duke)

The youngest son of Niccolò di Chimici, the current head of the di Chimici family. Due to a riding accident, his legs were mangled, which is a source of unhappiness for him and his family. With help from Georgia and Luciano, Falco permanently translates into Georgia's world to obtain medical attention. He becomes the foster-son of Luciano's parents, Vicky and David Mulholland, under the identity of Nicholas Duke. Though he thrives in the modern world, his relationship with Georgia and feeling of displacement results in homesickness and a reckless desire to return to Talia.

Gaetano di Chimici

The third son of Niccolò di Chimici, who was originally ordered to court Arianna Rossi. He is not handsome, but is kind, charming, unambitious and is more interested in becoming a scholar. He cares deeply for his younger brother Falco and becomes a trusted friend of the Stravaganti and the Duchessa of Bellezza. He is the only member of the di Chimici family to know the truth behind his younger brother's "death". Gaetano loves his cousin, Francesca of Bellona, who he eventually proposes to and marries. After the death of his older brother Carlo, Gaetano becomes heir to the title of Prince of Remora.

Ferdinando di Chimici (Pope Lenient VI)

The younger brother of Duke Niccolò, Ferdinando is Pope Lenient VI and also the current Prince of Remora. Unlike his brother, he is good man but is generally weak-willed and defers to his brother's commands. He is not ambitious and tries to uphold his position as the head of the Reman Church with appropriate honour, though he does indulge somewhat in the comfort his position brings and enjoys debating theology with his cardinals.

=== Giglia ===
Sky Meadows

The protagonist of City of Flowers, Sky is the quiet biracial son of Rosalind, an aromatherapist single mother recovering from Myalgic Encephalomyelitis, and black rock singer Rainbow Warrior. After acquiring a small perfume bottle as a talisman, he is transported to Giglia, the political stronghold of the di Chimici family, during a series of weddings for the illustrious clan at which Arianna, as the new Duchessa of Bellezza, is an honoured guest. He is entangled in a series of complex relationships both in and out of Talia, particularly issues regarding his absentee father. In Talia, Sky is known as "Celestino Pascoli", less formally "Brother Tino", as he adopts a disguise of a Franciscan novice monk and begins to show a strong interest in art.

Niccolò di Chimici

Introduced in City of Stars and the main antagonist of City of Stars and City of Flowers, Niccolò di Chimici is the duke of Giglia and older brother of Ferdinando di Chimici, the Prince of Remora and Pope Lenient VI. He is the father of four sons, Fabrizio, Carlo, Gaetano, and Falco, and one daughter, Beatrice. Like Silvia Bellini, he is kind and loyal to his friends and family, but dangerous to his enemies. An ambitious and ruthless man, he seeks to unite all the city states of northern Talia under di Chimici rule. The loss of his son Falco drives him even more to attempt to gain control over Bellezza and crush the Stravaganti, whom he believes are responsible for Falco's death. He is killed by Luciano in a duel in City of Flowers.

Sandro

Sky's guide to Giglia, an orphan boy raised in the streets and an apprentice to Enrico Poggi. He adopts a mongrel dog he names "Fratello" (Talian for "Brother"). Though he initially aids both the Stravaganti and the di Chimici, Sandro becomes frightened and disconcerted when he witnesses Carlo di Chimici kill Davide Nucci. He gradually spends more time with Brother Sulien instead of Enrico, viewing Sulien as a father figure, and becomes a novice at the Church of St. Mary-among-the-Vines.

Sulien Fabriano

Fratello Sulieno Fabriano, or Brother Sulien, the pharmacist-friar of the Church of St. Mary-among-the-Vines in Giglia. A Dominican black monk who runs the church's pharmacy, he is an expert on both medicine and poisons. He is Sky's mentor in Giglia, and also becomes a father figure to Sandro. Like Giuditta Miele, he is a resident Stravagante of Giglia.

Giuditta Miele

A skilled and respected sculptor in Giglia, commissioned to create a statue of the young Duchessa of Bellezza. She is also a Stravagante and becomes a confidante of sorts to Arianna Rossi during Arianna's stay in Giglia. As an artist, she recognizes Sky's interest and potential in art and encourages him, becoming a mentor to Sky alongside Sulien. Giuditta is a descendant of Girolamo Miele, one of the greatest architects in all of Talia and the older brother of Donato Miele, the sculptor of the bronze Sugar Fox statue in Padavia.

Fabrizio di Chimici

Introduced in City of Stars, Fabrizio is Duke Niccolò's eldest son and heir to the titles of Duke of Giglia and Grand-Duke of Tuschia. He shares his father's political ambitions, but his youth and inexperience mean that he has not earned the respect of the followers of the di Chimici family. Fabrizio is utterly driven to avenge his father's death and learn the secrets of the Stravaganti, and is disappointed that Gaetano and Beatrice do not support him in this respect. Like his father, he loves his family deeply; he is devastated by the deaths of his brothers and is extremely loving towards his wife, Caterina of Volana, and their infant son, Falco Niccolò Carlo, affectionately nicknamed "Bino."

=== Padavia ===
Matt Wood

The protagonist of City of Secrets, Matt is intelligent and well liked by his friends and family, but as a result of dyslexia, he feels shy about expressing himself and insecure about his relationship with his girlfriend Ayesha. When he buys a strange book from an antique shop, he arrives in Padavia, a city independent of the di Chimici family but has chosen to enact laws forbidding the occult. Though guided by Professor Constantin and Luciano, Matt becomes involved in several plots regarding forbidden magic and must save the lives of people who become implicated. In Talia, Matt is referred to as "Matteo Bosco" and works as a printer's apprentice. His dyslexia disappears when he is in Talia. Matt's mother, Jan Wood, is the English teacher at Barnsbury Comprehensive.

Professore Constantin

A professor at the Scriptorium at University of Padavia, Constantin is not native to Talia, though is a Stravagante and student of Dr. Dethridge like the other Stravaganti. He becomes Matt's mentor as well as Luciano's lecturer in rhetoric. In addition, Constantin is a printer and secretly prints banned books on topics including the occult in a secret scriptorium in Padavia.

=== Classe ===
Isabel Evans

The protagonist of City of Ships, Isabel tries hard to be unnoticeable so she is never compared to her older twin brother, Charlie, but often feels even worse because she winds up being forgotten. She has a strong interest in art, one of the few areas her brother is not interested in, and is transported to Classe after she finds a red velvet bag of silver tesserae. As a Stravagante, Isabel becomes more confident through her adventures in Talia and from being supported by a new group of friends, especially as she grows closer to Sky, whom she takes an interest in. However, her newfound sense of self is tested as she becomes a critical individual in saving the city of Classe from an alliance between the di Chimici and the Gate people. Notably, Isabel is the first Stravagante to use one talisman to travel to different cities in Talia, thanks to the efforts of Dr. Dethridge. While nicknamed "Bel" by her friends in London, Isabel is referred to as "Isabella" in Talia.

Flavia

A respected and wealthy trader and merchant in city of Classe, as well as a Stravagante. She is Isabel's mentor and is well-connected to numerous figures in Classe, including the noble Duke Germano and the mosaic-maker Fausto Ventura. As a trader, Flavia is the owner of the Silver Lady, a merchant ship, and trades many exotic goods, including spices, silk, and silver tesserae for the mosaics Classe is renowned for. While she is an insightful woman, Flavia has a strained relationship with her son, Andrea.

Andrea

Flavia's son, a pirate. He takes an instant liking to Isabel, often calling her "Bella Isabella", though has an unfortunate habit of abducting her whenever they meet. His strained relationship with Flavia is the result of Andrea's own disgust at Flavia's abusive husband, a man that haunts Andrea as the person he recognizes as his father. A daring man apparently indifferent to danger, he works as a double agent for Classe, pretending to ally himself with the Gate people in order to learn their secrets and then reveal them to Flavia and Germano.

Filippo Nucci

The only surviving son of Matteo and Graziella Nucci, whose family once lived in Giglia and were the di Chimici's greatest rivals. Since the family's exile to Classe, Filippo has become restless in hopes of finding a useful profession and does not wish to become a banker like his father. After a brief stint as a mosaic designer under Fausto Ventura, Duke Germano eventually delegates him to become a diplomat to Bellezza. Though he bears painful injuries from the massacre during the di Chimici weddings in City of Flowers, he holds no resentment towards the di Chimici family and retains strong feelings for Beatrice di Chimici.

Beatrice di Chimici

The only daughter of Niccolò di Chimici, Beatrice is the Principessa of Giglia, a gentle and capable young woman who wants her family and others to live peacefully rather than become obsessed with ambitious intrigues and vendettas. While her brothers are married off, she is initially content to remain by her father's side until his unexpected death. With her brother Fabrizio's growing desire to avenge Niccolò and learn the secrets of the Stravaganti, Beatrice becomes disconcerted, despite the love she has for her family. She is eventually pushed to the brink at Fabrizio's desperate plea for her to marry her cousin Filippo of Bellona and she flees to Bellezza, where she finds an ally in Arianna Rossi and the Stravaganti and her relationship with Filippo Nucci is gradually renewed.

Germano Mariano

The elected Duke of Classe, a respected and honourable man who has ruled over Classe for many years and is well loved by his citizens. He and his wife, Anna, have several children, though they are grown and show little interest in politics. His city and Bellezza have strong ties, not only as cities independent from di Chimici rule but also as coastal cities. With an impending threat of invasion from the Gate people by sea and the di Chimici army by land, Germano is left in a difficult position and wants to protect Talia and his city from impending destruction. However, despite the chaos around him, he continues to help others, such as Filippo Nucci and Andrea, to find their place in the world.

=== Fortezza ===
Laura Reid

The protagonist of City of Swords, initially introduced in City of Ships as a close friend of Isabel Evans and Ayesha. Deeply unhappy and stressed, and she has secretly resorted to self-harming to cope. After obtaining a silver paper knife from Mr. Goldsmith's shop, she is confronted by Isabel, Ayesha, Matt, and Sky, who all suspect that she will be the next Stravagante to Talia. Soon after stravagating to Fortezza, she falls in love with Ludo Vivoide, whose claim to the Fortezzan crown forces Laura to become his enemy when the Stravaganti elect to support Princess Lucia.

Fabio della Spada

A swordsmith from Fortezza and its Stravagante, who becomes Laura's mentor. However, with the city embroiled in a civil war and besieged by the di Chimici family attempting to restore Princess Lucia's rule over the city, Fabio soon finds himself preoccupied with forging weapons for the rebel army.

Ludovico Vivoide

A cousin of Aurelio and Raffaella Vivoide, Ludovico (Ludo) is only half-Manoush; unlike most Manoush, who have dark hair, Ludo stands out with his red hair, which is a result of his mixed heritage. His father is supposedly a di Chimici, though he does not know who. His arrival in Padavia comes at the most inconvenient time, when the Governor has banned the occult, including the practices of the Manoush. He rejoins his cousins in Classe, perceptively observing that Isabel is more than she appears. In City of Swords, he challenges Lucia's claim for the crown of Fortezza, revealing himself as the illegitimate son of Prince Jacopo. However, when his claim is rejected by the governing council, he joins the faction opposed to a woman ruling Fortezza and besiege the Princess and her supporters.

Lucia di Chimici

The elder daughter of Jacopo the Elder, the Prince of Fortezza. In City of Flowers, she marries her distant cousin and Duke Niccolo's second son, Carlo, but is widowed during the massacre that follows the di Chimici weddings. She returns to Fortezza and as the elder of Jacopo's two legitimate daughters, she is his heir. Though she is eventually declared the sovereign ruler of Fortezza with her father's death, her crown is threatened by Ludo and a faction that does not support a female ruler.

Guido Parola

A reformed assassin who tried to kill Silvia when she was Duchessa. He is noble by birth, but his family's fortune has been squandered away by his estranged older brother and his father has become ill; he reluctantly agreed to assassinate Silvia out of desperation for money to treat his father. When the Duchessa secretly pardons him, Guido becomes her loyal servant and bodyguard until he risks his life to save Arianna in City of Flowers. For trying to save her daughter, Silvia releases him from her service and promises to fund his education in Fortezza. During City of Swords, he becomes Lucia's most loyal protector and develops a strong relationship with her.

Jacopo the Elder

The Prince of Fortezza, the father of Princess Lucia and Bianca, the Duchessa of Volana. He is known as a kind man who loves his daughters dearly and willingly worked alongside Rodolfo Rossi to bring food and warmth to victims of the floods in City of Flowers. However, he was notorious in his youth for stabbing Donato Nucci in the heart when the young Nucci insulted Jacopo's sister Eleanora by failing to appear at their wedding in order to marry another woman.

=== Other Talians ===
Enrico Poggi

Known as the man in the blue cloak or the "Eel", Enrico is a spy and assassin under the employ of the di Chimici. He is not native to Bellezza, but had come to live there in order to marry a young woman named Giuliana. Enrico is notorious for numerous acts including the assassination attempts on Silvia and kidnapping both Luciano and Cesare at critical moments. During his second attempt on Silvia's life, he unwittingly kills his fiancée, Giuliana, who is being used as a double for the Duchessa at the time. The mysterious circumstances of her disappearance haunt him until he realizes that he was responsible for her death as a result of working for the di Chimici. He abruptly ends his service with the di Chimici family and forces his help upon Luciano and the other Stravaganti.

Rinaldo di Chimici

Introduced as a diplomat from the di Chimici to Bellezza, Rinaldo is a humourless and physically unattractive man delegated by the head of the family to persuade Silvia, the Duchessa of Bellezza, to join in an alliance with the di Chimici. After multiple diplomatic attempts fail, Rinaldo resorts to underhanded tactics including murder and kidnapping to secure Bellezza, which also fail. He subsequently leaves Bellezza and is eventually assigned to become chaplain to his uncle, Pope Lenient VI, and quickly rises to the rank of Cardinal. However, he remains ambitious and underhanded, seeking to learn the secrets of the Stravaganti. Rinaldo is the younger brother of Duke Alfonso of Volana and the older brother of Caterina, the wife of Fabrizio di Chimici.

Francesca di Chimici

Gaetano's cousin, a beautiful young woman and the sister of Filippo of Bellona. She is initially introduced in City of Masks, married off to Albani, an elderly Bellezzan councillor, to qualify her as Bellezzan citizen to be Rinaldo's write-in candidate to become Duchessa of Bellezza after Silvia's apparent death. When she loses the election, she furiously demands an annulment to her marriage, which is granted at the end of City of Stars. For the remainder of her stay in Bellezza, she becomes a good friend to Arianna Rossi. She marries Gaetano in City of Flowers; she and her husband remain one of the most trusted members of the di Chimici family to the Stravaganti. Her brother Filippo, however, proves to be untrustworthy.

Aurelio and Raffaella Vivoide

A blind harp-player and his sister, Aurelio and Raffaella are Manoush, a wandering, Romani-like people that roam Talia. They are allies to Luciano, Georgia, and the other Stravaganti. Aurelio is more high-minded and idealistic towards the traditional beliefs of the Manoush while Raffaella is more practical.

=== England ===
Vicky and David Mulholland

Lucien's parents. Vicky is a violin teacher; her son plays the violin in the orchestra and Georgia is one of Vicky's students. David salvages architectural features from houses. After Lucien and Falco's respective translations, the Mulhollands become Nicholas's foster parents and consider him as a second son. The Mulhollands eventually learn that Lucien is alive in Talia; the revelation is particularly jarring for Vicky, who continues to mourn her son. Vicky is friends with Jan Wood, Matt's mother, and Celia Jones, the mother of Ayesha's ex-boyfriend Jago.

Alice Greaves

Sky's girlfriend and Georgia's best friend. She is, technically, a Stravagante, but only traveled to Talia once, to prove to herself that it existed. Her father, awkwardly enough, is involved with Sky's mother. Unlike most of the other Barnsbury students, she is uncomfortable with Stravagation and views her friends' parallel world adventures with distaste, which gradually drives a wedge in her relationships with Sky and Georgia.

Mortimer Goldsmith

An antique shopkeeper who Georgia befriends shortly after she buys her Etruscan horse model from him. He lends a sympathetic ear to her troubles and soon becomes friends with Nick when Georgia brings him to the shop. His shop becomes likely location for appearing talismans appearing after Matt also obtains his spellbook talisman from the shop.

Ayesha

Matt's girlfriend and a close friend of both Isabel and Laura. She is an intelligent and attractive young woman who is supportive of Matt, though Matt is frequently insecure about their relationship, particularly since her previous boyfriend is not only a rival of Matt and her childhood friend, but also very intelligent. When Matt begins to meet with Nicholas, Georgia, and Sky regularly, Ayesha feels that he is becoming distant, but like Alice, she learns about Talia and her boyfriend's involvement. Ayesha never stravagates herself, but is supportive of Matt as he leads his double life.

Charlie Evans

Isabel's older twin brother, a genuinely good and kind person who excels in a numerous areas, such as swimming. As Isabel becomes more assertive and outgoing, Charlie becomes suspicious of how quickly his sister has formed new friendships and worries that she is distancing herself from him. His concerns culminate in an accidental Stravagation to Classe with Isabel's talisman and a near disastrous failed attempt for them both to return to their own world. However, the incident leaves Charlie impressed with Isabel's resolve and ability and he chooses to support her, though his own stravagation has left him with little interest in returning to Talia.
