= Nace (song) =

Single by Anasol

from the album Anasol
- Released: 2005
- Recorded: 2004
- Genre: Pop, electronic
- Length: 3:57
- Label: Universal Latin, Univision
- Songwriter(s): Anasol Escobar, David Cardenas
- Producer(s): Luis Fernando Ochoa

Anasol singles chronology
"Sentimiento" (2005)	"Nace" (2005)	"Vampira" (2010)

"Nace" (English: "Born") is a song by Colombian pop and electronic singer-songwriter Anasol. The song was released on 2006 as the second and final single from her eponymous third studio album Anasol (2005). The song was written, produced and recorded by Anasol and David Cardenas, and the music video was directed by Gustavo Garzon. It was nominated for video of the year in Premios Lo Nuestro 2006.

== Music video ==
Anasol in the Alice in Wonderland-inspired music video for "Nace"

The accompanying colorful music video for 'Nace' was directed by Gustavo Garzon, who also directed her Sentimiento video the same year. It was filmed in Buenos Aires, Argentina in 2005. the music video is highly inspired in Alice's Adventures in Wonderland, the choreography of the music video was made by Anasol. It was released in 2005 in the US and 2006 in Latin America. The music video was nominated in the Spanish-language awards show Premios Lo Nuestro 2006 for video of the year but lost to Luis Fonsi 'Nada es para siempre'.

== Track listing ==
Digital download
No.	Title	Length
1.	"Nace"	3:42
2.	"Nace (Jez Colin Remix)"	4:17
