= Grupo Armado =

- Origin: Managua, Nicaragua
- Genres: Heavy metal, Rock en Español
- Years active: 2004 - 2006
- Members: Alejandro Mejía Lara; Bikentios Chávez Canales; Noel Portocarrero; Ernesto Rodríguez
- Website: Official Website

Grupo Armado was a popular Nicaraguan rock band formed by Alejandro Mejía (lead vocals and percussion), Bikentios Chávez (drums), Noel Portocarrero (bass) and Ernesto Rodríguez (lead guitar). This was actually the line up for the Ecosistema del Sistema Album's release but most of the album's tour was executed(guitars) by another guitarist named Arturo Vaughan who was the guitarist with more stability during the band's existence. Also some other musicians participated in the project. Among them: Andres Centeno (bass), Jose Alejandro Garcia (bass), Daniel Chavarria (guitars), Rob Vaughan (guitars). The group was an offspring of CPU, another popular rock band started by Mejía and Chávez.

The band was born in 2004 with musicians from different groups active at that time with an odd mixture of musical genres and backgrounds. They all had in common their opposition to the Establishment that was reflected in the band's lyrics.

Inspired by bands such as A.N.I.M.A.L., Hermética, Habeas Corpus, Metallica and diverse music genres such as Heavy metal, Hardcore hip-hop, Afro-Caribbean music and Nicaraguan folk music, they released their debut album Ecosistema del sistema in 2006 and broke up shortly after. Despite the later, Grupo Armado is still one of the most popular rock groups in the country, receiving a lot of airing time on local rock radio stations.

== Discography ==
=== Albums ===
- Ecosistema del sistema (2006)

=== Singles ===
- Güegüense falso
- Ecosistema del sistema
- Gárgola
- Chinchilillo
- Dónde
- Síndrome necromórbido audiovisualmente adquirido
- El tigre y el canario
