= HMS Armada =

HMS Armada was the name of two ships of the British Royal Navy:

- HMS Armada (1810) was a 74-gun third rate launched in 1810 that saw action in the War of 1812 and was sold in 1863.
- HMS Armada (D14) was a Battle-class destroyer launched in 1943 and scrapped in 1965.
