= Armadillo (disambiguation) =

An armadillo is a mammal with an armored shell.

Armadillo may also refer to:

== Film, literature, video games, music ==
- Armadillo (2010 film), a 2010 Danish documentary about the war in Afghanistan
- Armadillo (2001 film), a 2001 British TV film starring James Frain
- Armadillo (character), a Marvel Comics villain
- Armadillo (magazine), a web-based magazine
- Armadillo (novel), a novel by William Boyd
- Armadillo (video game), a 1991 NES/Family Computer game
- Armadillo (G.I. Joe), a fictional character in the G.I. Joe universe
- Armadillo Quintero, a villain from the television series The Shield
- The Armadillo, poem by Elizabeth Bishop

== Places ==
- Armadillo World Headquarters, a music hall and entertainment center in Austin, Texas between 1970 and 1980
- SEC Armadillo or Clyde Auditorium, an iconic concert venue in Glasgow, Scotland
- Forward Operating Base Armadillo, military base near Girishk, Afghanistan

== Military ==
- 16th Armored Division (United States), nicknamed Armadillo
- Armadillo (armoured truck), an extemporised armoured fighting vehicle, from Britain in 1940
- Armadillo-class tanker, a type of ship commissioned into the United States Navy
- Armadillo (APC), a Guatemalan built and operated armoured personnel carrier

== Other ==
- Armadillo (crustacean), a genus of woodlice in the family Armadillidae
- Armadillo (protein), a Drosophila protein that is homologous to mammalian beta-catenin
- Armadillo (C++ library), a software library for linear algebra
- Armadillo Aerospace, an aerospace company led by John Carmack that has ceased operations
- Armadillo Formation, a geologic formation in British Columbia, Canada
