= Institute of Student Employers =

The Institute of Student Employers (ISE) is an independent, not-for-profit professional body that represents over 750 organisations which recruit and develop graduates in the United Kingdom.

ISE was first established in October 1968, and is also one of the founding members of the International Network of Graduate Recruitment and Development Associations (INGRADA). Its offices are based in London.

== Research ==
ISE publishes two flagship reports each year the Student Recruitment Survey and the Student Development Survey from the largest group of early talent employers in the UK.

It also produces pulse surveys, guides, toolkits and weekly Insights articles for its members and limited access for the public. It is frequently asked for comment on the student employment landscape from the press.

== Publications and Events ==
ISE publishes all content online via its Knowledge Hub, having stopped printing the Student Employer magazine in journal format. The ISE continues to distribute a weekly email newsletter.

ISE also hosts an annual two-day conference for student recruitment professionals, the Student Recruitment Conference where winners of the yearly ISE Awards are announced.

ISE hosts many other events including the annual ISE Apprenticeships Conference and ISE Student Development Conference, plus webinars, member forums and courses.
