= Amarilis (poet) =

17th century Peruvian pseudonymous poet

Amarilis was a pseudonymous poet from Peru in the early 17th century. She is known from a single poem in the form of an epístola, or epistle, titled Amarilis a Belardo. The title, which translates to Amarilis to Belardo in English, refers to Amarilis' polite manner of addressing "Belardo," whose true identity is known as Spanish playwright Lope de Vega. De Vega published this epistle in La Filomena (1621), which is a book of lyrical poems and epic poetry including both Amarilis' epistle and his response to it. While Lope de Vega defends himself from libel in the second half of La Filomena, the book can also be regarded as a look into the playwright's more personal life. Amarilis a Belardo is lengthy and conveys Amarilis' feelings of isolation due to her responsibilities as a nun, as well as her frustrations from being in Peru instead of Spain. Her identity remains a mystery, with certain scholars even doubting she ever existed, but Amarilis is generally believed to have been a woman.

== Life and identity ==
While Amarilis wrote "Amarilis a Belardo" in 1619, little is known about her date of birth. All that could be said about her age range was that she wrote her epistle as a young woman. It is likely that she was a nun living in a convent in either the small city of Huánuco or Peru's capital, Lima. In La Filomena, Lope de Vega introduces Amarilis to his readers as a Criolla, someone who was born in the Americas but is ethnically Spanish.

Everything else that could be gathered about her life is solely sourced from her poem. Amarilis claims to have been descended from two individuals close to conquistador Francisco Pizarro. After being orphaned as a toddler or small child, Amarilis was sent with her younger sister, Belisa, to live with her aunt. Amarilis describes both herself and her younger sister as having been gifted children in their own ways. Their relationship was close, and Amarilis further explains that her sister became famous and married un joven venturoso, or a fortunate young man. Amarilis was unmarried at the time her epistle was written, telling Lope de Vega that she was beautiful enough to marry well, but was pushed towards nunhood by inspiration from las dulces Musas, the sweet muses. Any further information about Amarilis would be pure conjecture.

The name Amarilis was credited to multiple different women over the years, but no particular theory has surfaced as more plausible than any other. Some historians and researchers believe that Amarilis was Doña Marta de Nevares Santoyo, a Spanish woman whom Lope de Vega met in 1616 and had a long-term affair with, or consider the possibility that her real identity was Isabel de Figueroa, María de Alvarado, or María Tello de Lara y de Arévalo y Espinosa. Other scholars. including Peruvian scholar Ricardo Palma, doubt that Amarilis was a woman; still others regard her as a total work of fiction.

According to American historian Irving Leonard, it is unlikely that Amarilis was one of Lope de Vega's fellow playwrights; she lived in a time when women playwrights were uncommon in Spain, let alone in its distant colonial lands such as Peru. It is far more plausible that Amarilis learned of de Vega's plays when she went to one of the local theaters, which were particularly common in the Lima at the time.

== Epistle ==
=== Summary ===
Amarilis a Belardo is a long epistle that, after revealing Amarilis' feelings for Lope de Vega, serves as a request for him to write a biography on Saint Dorothy, her patron saint. Amarilis also urges de Vega to end his affair with Marta de Nevares because he was supposed to uphold his spiritual duties as a priest. De Vega responded to this poem a year later, confessing his love to the unknown author.

=== Structure ===
The poem itself is split into 19 stanzas of varying lengths, each depicting a different category of content. It was written in canzone form, a traditionally Italian categorization usually given to poems that consist of stanzas with 10-12-syllable lines without a refrain, but this particular work has roughly 18 lines in each of its stanzas. Amarilis does not keep to one specific rhyme scheme, but does ensure that different line endings within a given stanza do rhyme; for example, one part of a stanza may have the ABCA rhyme scheme, while another may have a rhyming couplet. She was influenced by Italian theories about poetry, and also used her knowledge on the subject of Latin poets, especially of Virgil, to create her work.

=== Exegesis ===
While the epistle's content could point to its description as being a mere "fan letter," the remarkable genius behind its structure and overall quality set it apart. Amarilis uses various complex metaphors to describe her love towards de Vega, explaining that it extends far past anything physical or romantic. Aware of her status as a woman living in the Spanish colonies, Amarilis declares that a man in her position would not have dared to be so brave as to address a famous Spanish author such as Lope de Vega. She then goes on to say that "la mujer, que es fuerte, / no teme alguna vez la misma muerte" ("a strong woman is not fearful of death itself").

=== Reception ===
Amarilis' epistle is considered to be a literary masterpiece, and even Lope de Vega was so affected by her passionate and brilliantly crafted verse that he was driven not only to respond, but also to publish the epistle in one of his books. Author William Felker goes even further, stating that he considers the epistle to be "the finest of early Latin American lyrics." However, Amarilis remains largely unknown to world literature, especially in comparison to later poets such as Sor Juana Ines de la Cruz, whom Felker claims was the first Latin American lyricist to match Amarilis' literary prowess. In fact, the speculation about Amarilis' identity is one of the most debated questions about de Vega's whole career.
