= Armada, Arkansas =

Coordinates: 35.716749°N 94.195484°W

Armada is an extinct town in Crawford County, in the U.S. state of Arkansas.

== History ==
A post office called Armada was established in 1888, and remained in operation until 1943. Armada was a shipping point of timber and fruits.
