= Moses Amarillo =

18th-century Greek rabbi

(Ḥayyim) Moses Amarillo (Hebrew: (חיים) משה אמריליו), was a rabbi at Thessaloniki during the first half of the eighteenth century.

== Works ==
He edited, and often annotated, the works of his father, Solomon Amarillo, and is the author of a collection of hiddushim (novellæ) on legal questions treated of by Maimonides. To this are added two separate collections of opinions and comments on criminal law, the first dealing with the payment of indemnities, the second with the laws concerning the sale, loss, and robbery of property. The three parts appeared together, under the title "Halakah le-Mosheh" (The Decision of Moses), Thessaloniki, 1756. To a collection of his responsa which he had previously published, he gave the title "Debar Mosheh" (The Word of Moses), Thessaloniki, 1742–50.
