= AGR (automobile) =

The AGR was an English automobile built by Ariel & General Repairs of Brixton between 1911 and 1915.

The company offered a 10/12 hp 1540 cc four-cylinder model based on the French Hurtu, a marque for which they were agents. The car was slightly longer than the Hurtu and was sold at £255 for the chassis or £315 with open four-seater coachwork.
