= Escorpión de Primavera =

Studio album by Anasol
- Released: May 1999
- Recorded: 1997–1999
- Genre: Latin pop, latin rock, alternative pop, electronic
- Length: 45:04
- Label: Sony Records; PATO
- Producer: Anasol Escobar

Anasol chronology
| Escorpión de Primavera (1999) | Astros (2002) |

Singles from Escorpión de Primavera
- 1. "Pensando en Desorden" Released: 1999; 2. "No Dejes..." Released: 2000

Escorpión de Primavera (English: Scorpion of spring) is the debut studio album by Colombian singer-songwriter Anasol, released in 1999 on the independent label Pato Records.

== Track listing ==
All tracks are written by Anasol.

| No. | Title | Length |
|---|---|---|
| 1. | "Lluvia Azul" | 5:00 |
| 2. | "Pensando en Desorden" | 4:30 |
| 3. | "Preludio A Solas" | 3:05 |
| 4. | "A 25 Mil... Pies" | 3:22 |
| 5. | "Amarillo" | 4:35 |
| 6. | "Pasión Por Un Sueño" | 3:50 |
| 7. | "Más Allá" | 3:26 |
| 8. | "Parte De Mi" | 4:18 |
| 9. | "Respiro (Frío De Ciudad)" | 3:58 |
| 10. | "Un Ángel" | 4:23 |
| 11. | "No Dejes... No Dejes..." | 4:37 |
