= 1085 Amaryllis =

Background asteroid

Discovery
- Discovered by: K. Reinmuth
- Discovery site: Heidelberg Obs.
- Discovery date: 31 August 1927

Designations
- Pronunciation: /æməˈrɪlɪs/
- Named after: Amaryllis (flowering plant)
- Alternative designations: 1927 QH · 1964 CL; A908 HB · A915 QA; A921 RC
- Minor planet category: main-belt · (outer) background

Orbital characteristics
- Epoch 4 September 2017 (JD 2458000.5)
- Uncertainty parameter 0
- Observation arc: 109.40 yr (39,957 days)
- Aphelion: 3.3182 AU
- Perihelion: 3.0506 AU
- Semi-major axis: 3.1844 AU
- Eccentricity: 0.0420
- Orbital period (sidereal): 5.68 yr (2,076 days)
- Mean anomaly: 40.309°
- Mean motion: 0° 10^{m} 24.24^{s} / day
- Inclination: 6.6396°
- Longitude of ascending node: 139.98°
- Argument of perihelion: 127.53°

Physical characteristics
- Dimensions: 65.55±14.66 km 67.14±21.21 km 69.281±0.124 km 69.68 km (derived); 69.95±1.4 km 71.025±1.105 km 72.93±0.78 km
- Synodic rotation period: 18.111±0.025 h 18.2±0.1 h
- Geometric albedo: 0.04±0.02; 0.04±0.04; 0.0437 (derived); 0.058±0.002; 0.0608±0.0058; 0.0628±0.003; 0.067±0.013
- Spectral type: X · C (assumed)
- Absolute magnitude (H): 9.40 · 9.70 · 9.8 · 9.81 · 9.92±0.25

1085 Amaryllis /æməˈrɪlɪs/, provisional designation 1927 QH, is a background asteroid from the outer regions of the asteroid belt, approximately 69 kilometers in diameter. It was discovered on 31 August 1927, by astronomer Karl Reinmuth at the Heidelberg-Königstuhl State Observatory in southwest Germany. The asteroid was named after the flowering plant Amaryllis.

== Orbit and classification ==
Amaryllis is a non-family asteroid from the main belt's background population. It orbits the Sun in the outer asteroid belt at a distance of 3.1–3.3 AU once every 5 years and 8 months (2,076 days). Its orbit has an eccentricity of 0.04 and an inclination of 7° with respect to the ecliptic.

The asteroid was first identified as A908 HB at Taunton Observatory (803) in April 1908. A few days later, the body's observation arc begins at the United States Naval Observatory (786) in May 1908, or more than 19 years prior to its official discovery observation at Heidelberg.

== Physical characteristics ==
Amaryllis has been characterized as an X-type asteroid by Pan-STARRS photometric survey. It is also an assumed carbonaceous C-type asteroid.

=== Rotation period ===
In March 2004, a first rotational lightcurve of Amaryllis was obtained from photometric observations by French amateur astronomer René Roy. Lightcurve analysis gave a rotation period of 18.2 hours with a brightness variation of 0.20 magnitude (U=2). In May 2016, the Spanish amateur astronomer group OBAS (Asteroid Observers, Spanish: Observadores de Asteroids) measured a refined period of 18.111 hours with an amplitude of 0.19 magnitude (U=3-).

=== Diameter and albedo ===
According to the surveys carried out by the Infrared Astronomical Satellite IRAS, the Japanese Akari satellite and the NEOWISE mission of NASA's Wide-field Infrared Survey Explorer, Amaryllis measures between 65.55 and 72.93 kilometers in diameter and its surface has an albedo between 0.04 and 0.067.

The Collaborative Asteroid Lightcurve Link derives an albedo of 0.0437 and a diameter of 69.68 kilometers based on an absolute magnitude of 9.8.

== Naming ==
This minor planet was named after the flowering planet Amaryllis, also known as belladonna lily, Jersey lily, naked lady, or amarillo. The official naming citation was mentioned in The Names of the Minor Planets by Paul Herget in 1955 (H 102).

=== Reinmuth's flowers ===
Due to his many discoveries, Karl Reinmuth submitted a large list of 66 newly named asteroids in the early 1930s. The list covered his discoveries with numbers between (1009) and (1200) and also contained a sequence of 28 asteroids, starting with 1054 Forsytia, that were named after plants, in particular flowering plants (also see list of minor planets named after animals and plants § Plants).
