= Armada House, Bristol =

Grade II listed building in England

Armada House
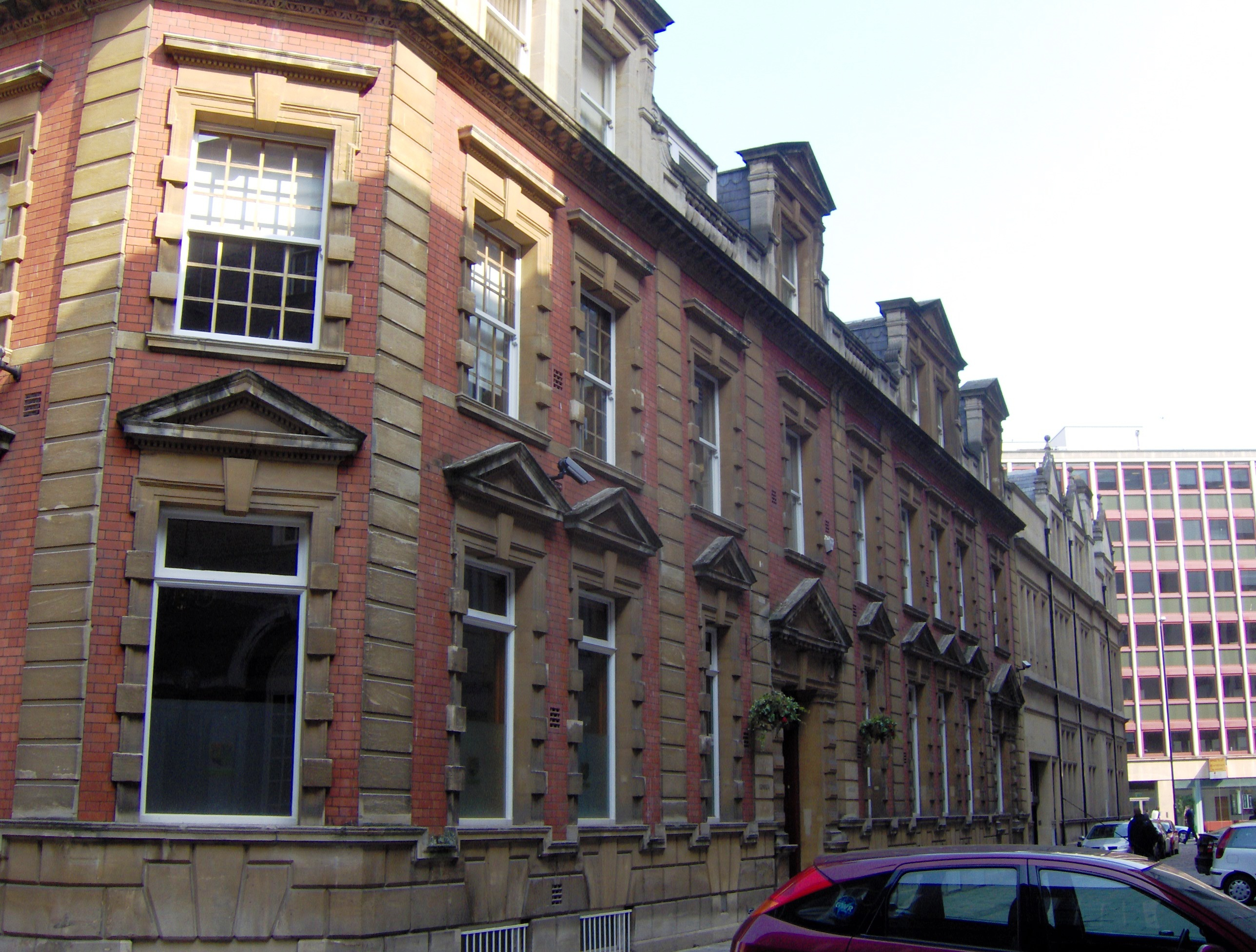

- Location within Bristol
- Former names: Avon House, Nova House

General information
- Architectural style: Edwardian Baroque
- Location: Bristol, England
- Coordinates: 51.4527°N 2.5958°W
- Completed: 1903

Design and construction
- Architect: Henry Williams

Website
- https://armadahousebristol.com/

Armada House (grid reference ST587728) (previously known as Avon House and Nova House) is on Telephone Avenue, off Baldwin Street, Bristol.

== History ==
It has been designated by English Heritage as a grade II listed building. It was built in 1903 by Henry Williams, who also designed Everard's Printing Works. It was first built for use by the Bristol Water Company and was also formerly the offices of the National Telephone Co. In 1971 one room was equipped by Post Office Telecommunications as a Confravision studio. From 1982 the second floor was used by British Telecommunications as "Telecom TAN", one of the first commercial call centres & messaging bureaux in the UK.

The building was built in the Edwardian baroque style and has two historic fireplaces. The first, located in the ground-floor lobby, is a Tudor fire surround from 1550. The second fire surround on the first floor is in the Jacobean style and is dated 1700. Both fireplaces were moved to Armada House from numbers 6 & 7 Small Street, which belonged to the Elton family.

== Current Use ==
Armada House was purchased by Bristol Venues in 2021 and the building has been renovated into a brand new meeting and events venue with two function rooms on the ground floor and five meeting rooms for hire on the first floor.

== Gallery ==
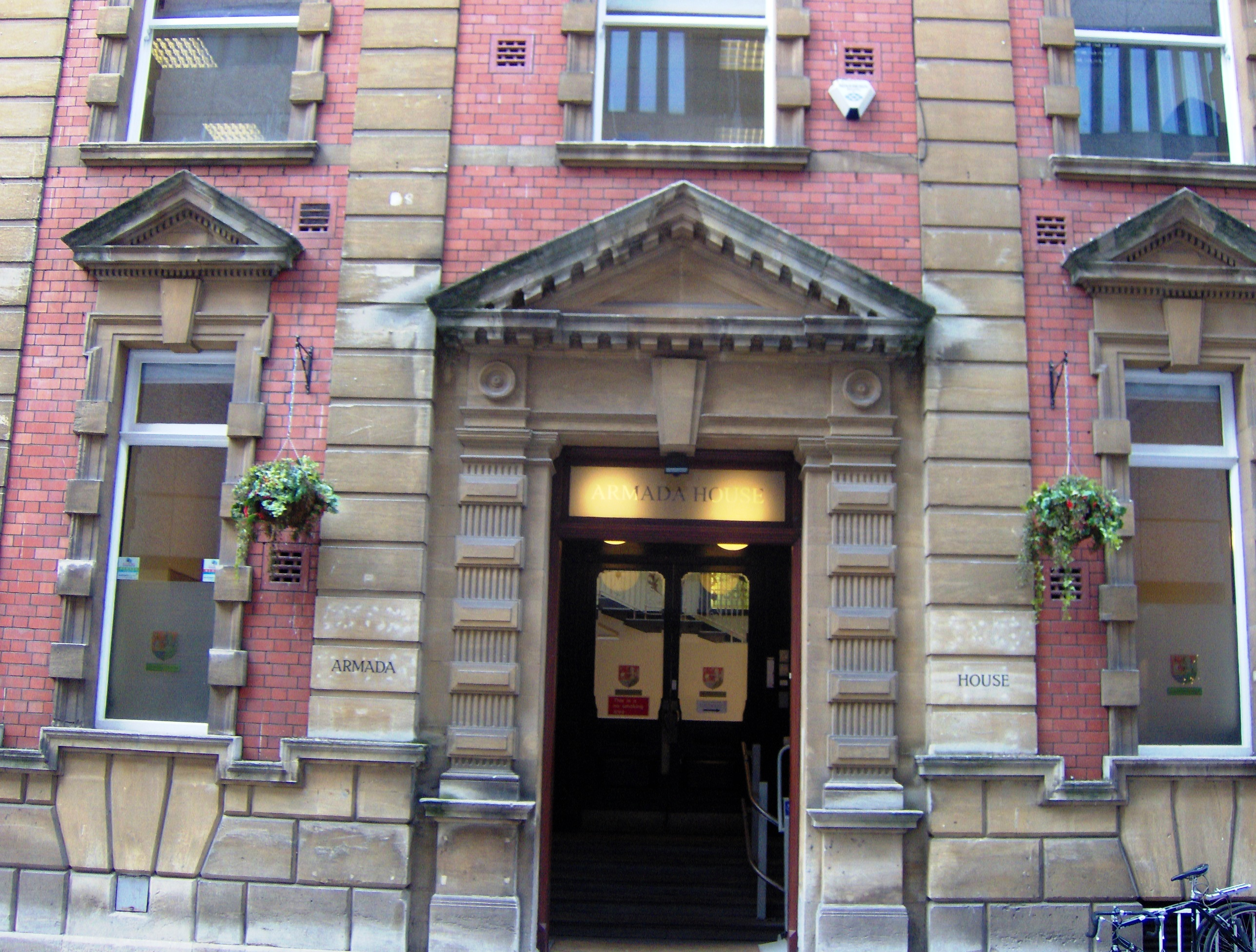
Doorway to Armada House
