= Amaryllis Chamber Ensemble =

The Amaryllis Chamber Ensemble is a Boston area chamber music ensemble. Founded in 2000, the group presents concerts of music for woodwind and stringed instruments throughout New England. They perform music from the standard chamber music repertoire as well as music by contemporary composers.

== History ==
The Amaryllis Chamber Ensemble was founded in 2000 by students from The Boston Conservatory. The original instrumentation of the ensemble was flute, violin and cello, however the group soon expanded to include other woodwind and stringed instruments. The ensemble took its name from flutist and composer Bonnie Cochran's piece entitled, Amaryllis—the first piece ever performed by the ensemble.
