= Armata =

Armata may refer to:

- Armata, a settlement in the municipality Konitsa, northern Greece
- Armata Corsa, an underground separatist terrorist organization in Corsica, today disbanded
- Armata Universal Combat Platform, a Russian platform for future heavy infantry fighting vehicle, main battle tank, and other heavy military machines.
  - T-14 Armata, the main battle tank based on the above platform
- Ludmila Armata (born 1954), Polish-born Canadian painter

== See also ==
- Armada (disambiguation)
