= Mary Hoffman =

British writer and critic (born 1945)

- Born: 1945 (age 80–81); Eastleigh, Hampshire, England
- Occupation: Novelist
- Spouse: Stephen Barber

Mary Lassiter Hoffman (born 1945) is a British writer and critic. She has had over 90 books published whose audiences range from children to adults. One of her best known works is the children's book Amazing Grace, which was a New York Times best-seller at 1.5 million copies and a finalist for the 1991 Kate Greenaway Medal. From 2002 to 2012, she wrote the teen fiction series Stravaganza.

== Background ==
Born in Hampshire, England in 1945, Mary Hoffman was the youngest of three daughters. From a young age, she enjoyed going underground to visit the office of her father who worked for the railway. Hoffman won a scholarship to James Allen's Girls' School in Dulwich. From there she went to the University of Cambridge to study English at Newnham College and then spent two years studying Linguistics at University College London.

In 1998, she was made an Honorary Fellow of the Library Association for her work with children and schools. She worked at the Open University for nearly five years, contributing to courses for teachers on reading, language and children's literature. For eighteen years she was Reading Consultant to BBC Schools TV's Look and Read series and wrote the teaching scripts. She has been a freelance, self-employed professional writer and journalist since the mid-90s. She has argued for the role of British Children's Laureate to encompass active lobbying against cutbacks to libraries and was a nominee for the 2011–2013 post.

Hoffman lives with her husband Stephen Barber, whom she married in 1972. She moved from London to West Oxfordshire in 2001. They have three daughters, including the writer Rhiannon Lassiter. Hoffman frequently works in Italy and speaks Italian. She has also lectured in Latin and Anglo-Saxon. Hoffman is a contributing blogger to Book Maven and The History Girls. In 2016, Hoffman and Barber founded The Greystones Press, an independent book publishing company.

== Writing ==
Mary Hoffman's first book was White Magic in 1975. At the suggestion of Richard Adams, she had it published by Rex Collings after it was rejected by several other publishers. Hoffman has written 24 picture books including the Amazing Grace series. When it was published, she received an award from Waldenbooks. Amazing Grace was adapted to the stage by Shay Youngblood and ranked as one of the 50 best culturally diverse children's books by Seven Stories. The 2015 anniversary edition features an afterword by LeVar Burton. The illustrator, Caroline Binch, hired members of a family in Gambia as models for Grace and other characters. Hoffman has described the trip to visit them as her first trip to Africa.

Hoffman began to focus more on teen fiction in the years since, becoming known for the Stravaganza series and the historical novel The Falconer's Knot, which won the French Prix Polar Jeunesse and was shortlisted for The Guardian Children's Book Award and North East Teenage Book Award.

Hoffman has written several re-tellings of myths, legends, fairy tales, nursery stories and biblical stories. These include Women of Camelot, which tells the King Arthur stories from the points of view of the female characters. She has also edited collections of stories, including Lines in the Sand (2003) – a response to the allied invasion of Iraq, with all funds raised donated to UNICEF in Iraq. She was nominated for the Astrid Lindgren Memorial Award in 2011. Her works for adults are published under a variety of names including Amy Lovell, Suzy Cavendish and Mary Lassiter.
