= Asheville Global Report =

American liberal independent media outlet

The Asheville Global Report (AGR) was an American liberal independent media outlet based in Asheville, North Carolina. Between 1999 and May 2007, the AGR published a free weekly newspaper. The organization also produced radio programming and a television show, The Global Report, which aired on Free Speech TV and public-access television cable TV channels throughout the US, including Asheville, Atlanta, Boone, Chapel Hill, Raleigh and dozens of other metropolitan areas. According to its website, the AGR's mission is to "cover news underreported by mainstream media, believing that a free exchange of information is necessary to organize for social change.

Since its inception in 1999, the Asheville Global Report received several awards, including ten Project Censored Awards. Additionally, the American Civil Liberties Union of Western North Carolina presented the AGR with its "Champion of Civil Liberties Award" and the Utne Reader has nominated the AGR for “Best International Coverage in the United States.”

According to anarchist blogger Chuck Munson the "AGR is an excellent example of what independent media activists could be doing in their local communities... [It] is mercifully free of the typical leftist rhetoric and jargon that one frequently finds in activist-run community newspapers."

“The Global Report is a favorite for International News among the 200 Project Censored students and faculty at Sonoma State University. For a readable digest of important international news stories I cannot think of a more comprehensive source.” —Peter Phillips, Director, Project Censored

“A good example of how motivated citizens can provide a hard news alternative to the mainstream media in their communities.” — Adbusters

On May 20, 2007, AGR editor Eamon Martin announced that the organization would cease publication of its newspaper after eight and a half years due to the "difficulties in sustaining a grassroots publishing enterprise." The non-profit news media project continued as a radio program, website, and as a television program broadcast nationwide via Free Speech TV on the Dish and Direct TV satellite networks until April 2011.
