= Australian Association of Graduate Employers =

Australian non-profit industry body

- Type: Not-for-profit
- Industry: Industry association
- Founded: 1988
- Headquarters: Sydney, Australia
- Key people: Shanan Green (Acting CEO)
- Products: Advice to members
- Revenue: A$1,094,000 (2015)
- Number of employees: 0
- Website: http://www.aage.com.au

The Australian Association of Graduate Employers (AAGE) is a non-profit industry body representing organisations that recruit and develop Australian graduates.

The AAGE was incorporated in 1988 and is headquartered in Sydney, Australia.

== Board of directors ==
The AAGE is led by a board of volunteer directors.

== Members ==
The AAGE has over 400 employer member organisations from large, medium and small employers in both the public and private sectors. A list of the AAGE's employer members can be found at www.aage.com.au/full-members.
