= Amaryllis (given name) =

Ancient female Greek name

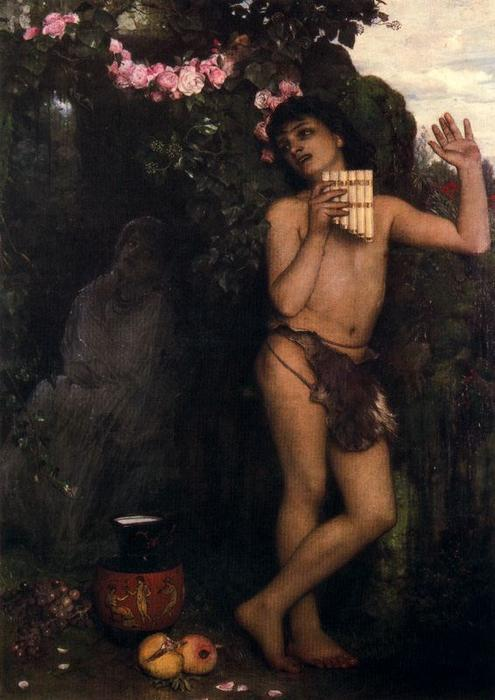
La Complainte du berger (Daphnis et Amaryllis) by Arnold Böcklin

Amaryllis (/ˌæməˈrɪlɪs/; Ancient Greek: Ἀμαρυλλίς) is a feminine given name derived from the Ancient Greek verb amarýssō (ἀμαρύσσω), meaning "sparkle, shine".

== Origin ==
The name appears in Ancient Greek and Roman literature. In Theocritus' Idylls, a goatherd sings a serenade outside the cave of the nymph Amaryllis. Amaryllis was also the name of a heroine in Virgil's pastoral poem Eclogues. The Amaryllis flower is named after her.

Amaryllis is not a very popular name in Greece, nor in other countries. It has been included in the Greek Orthodox calendar only recently, meaning there is a name day for Amaryllis, which is October 10.

The name rose in popularity in the United States in 1927 after the publication of The Magic Garden, a serialized fictional story by American author Gene Stratton-Porter in McCall's magazine, that featured a heroine named Amaryllis Minton. Usage of the name increased from seven in 1926 to 45 American girls named Amaryllis in 1927.

== Women ==
- Amaryllis Collymore (c. 1745–1828), Afro-Barbadian slave, plantation owner and businesswoman
- Amaryllis Fleming (1925 – 1999), British cello performer and teacher
- Amaryllis Garnett (1943 – 1973), English actress and diarist
- Amaryllis Fox Kennedy (born 1980), American writer and former CIA officer
- Amaryllis Tremblay, Canadian actress
