= Armada Centre =

Shopping centre in Plymouth, Devon

Coordinates: 50°22′25″N 4°08′39″W

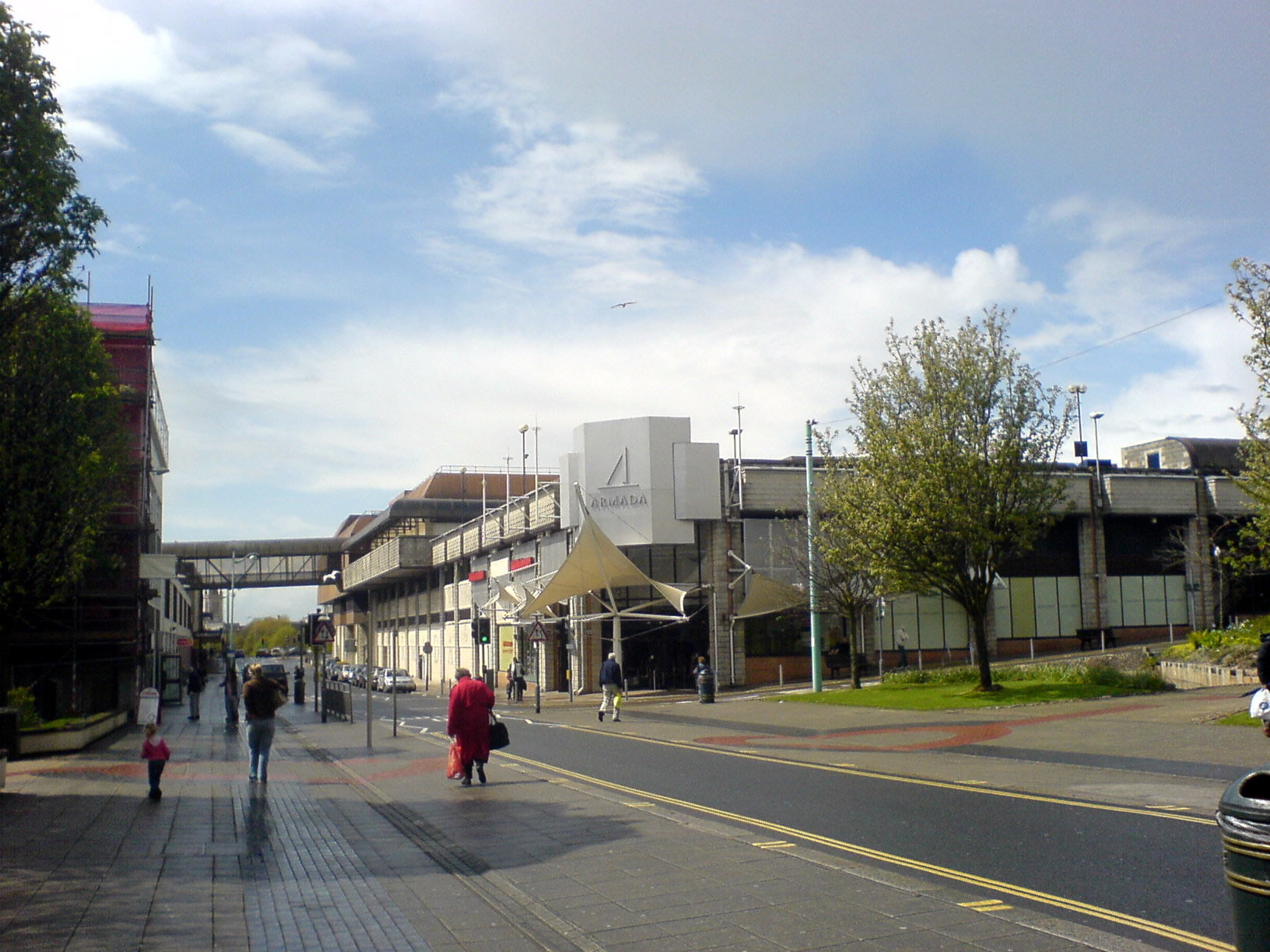
The main entrance

The Armada Centre is a shopping centre in Plymouth, England. It was established in 1986 and refurbished in 2004.

The centre is laid out on three floors, with Sainsbury's occupying the upper floor. Other retailers that are housed on the ground floor include Wilko and Laura Ashley. It had a skywalk to the Mayflower West car park, both since demolished after the car park was found to be structurally unsound.

== History ==
In 1996, a planning company based in Reading submitted an application to transform the Armada Centre into a new leisure centre, which would contain a 15-screen multiplex cinema, nightclub and bingo hall.

== Current owners ==
The freehold of the building is currently owned by the trustees of the BBC pension trust fund.
