= National Association of Colleges and Employers =

- Abbreviation: NACE
- Formation: 1956; 70 years ago
- Type: Non-profit, NGO
- Tax ID no.: 81-3526091
- Purpose: "The National Association of Colleges and Employers empowers and connects the community of professionals who support, develop, and employ the college-educated workforce."
- Headquarters: Bethlehem, Pennsylvania
- Members: 17,000 individuals, 2,800 organizations
- President and CEO: Shawn VanDerziel
- Website: www.naceweb.org

The National Association of Colleges and Employers (NACE) is an American nonprofit professional association established in 1956 in Bethlehem, Pennsylvania, for college career services, recruiting practitioners, and others who wish to hire the college educated.

== History ==
The College Placement Publications Council was founded on November 29, 1956. It was later renamed to College Placement Council and became the National Association of Colleges and Employers in 1956. In 1998, 1,600 companies and 1,700 tertiary institutions were members of the association.

== Standards ==
NACE members operate under the association's Principles for Professional Conduct, its code of ethics. The association provides its career services members with guidelines for their operations through the Professional Standards for College & University Career Services and employer members through Professional Standards for University Relations and Recruiting.

== Research ==
NACE conducts research into four main areas: benchmarks for members on their operations and professional practices; the hiring outlook for new college graduates; starting salary offers to new college graduates, and student attitudes about careers, job search and employers.

== Publications and events ==
NACE publishes a quarterly journal and biweekly newsletter for its members. It also publishes a survey of salary offers (Salary Survey) three times a year.

NACE hosts an annual conference, a five-day training management program for career services professionals (the Management Leadership Institute), a two-day management training program for university recruiters (Recruiter Leadership Institute), workshops, roundtables, and virtual seminars. NACE Professional Development provides an extensive selection of ICF-, CCE-, NBCC-, and HRCI-approved courses to satisfy continuing education requirements.

== Bibliography ==
- Flores, Will (May 2004). Philosophical orientation of career centers and career professionals in the National Association of Colleges and Employers (NACE) (PhD thesis). University of San Francisco. ProQuest 305034374.
