= Chroma feature =

Graphical representation of music

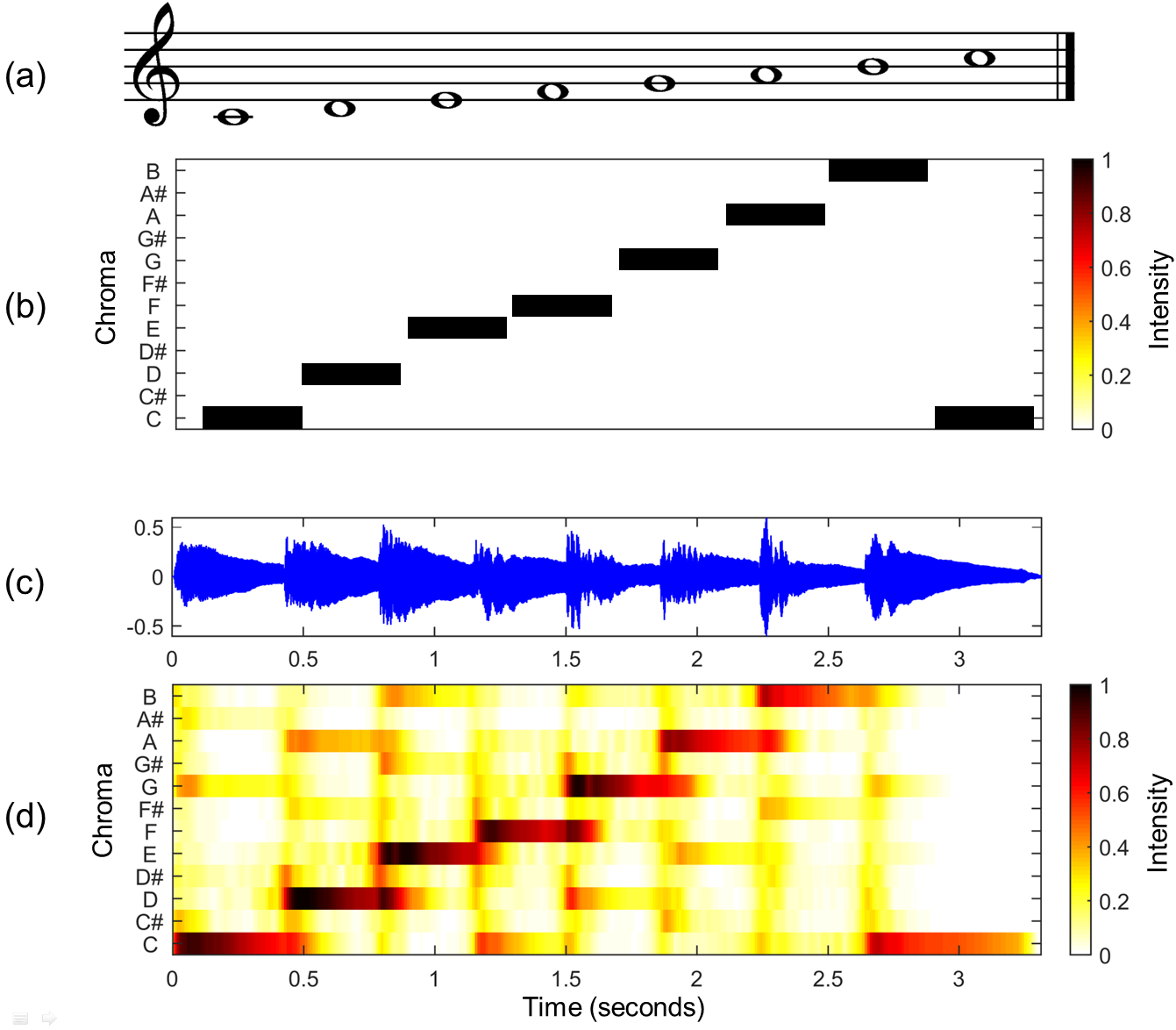
(a) Musical score of a C-major scale. (b) Chromagram obtained from the score. (c) Audio recording of the C-major scale played on a piano. (d) Chromagram obtained from the audio recording.

In Western music, the term chroma feature or chromagram closely relates to twelve different pitch classes. Chroma-based features, which are also referred to as "pitch class profiles", are a powerful tool for analyzing music whose pitches can be meaningfully categorized (often into twelve categories) and whose tuning approximates to the equal-tempered scale. One main property of chroma features is that they capture harmonic and melodic characteristics of music, while being robust to changes in timbre and instrumentation.

== Definition ==
The underlying observation is that humans perceive two musical pitches as similar in color if they differ by an octave. Based on this observation, a pitch can be separated into two components, which are referred to as tone height and chroma. Assuming the equal-tempered scale, one considers twelve chroma values represented by the set

{C, C♯, D, D♯, E, F, F♯, G, G♯, A, A♯, B}

that consists of the twelve pitch spelling attributes as used in Western music notation. Note that in the equal-tempered scale different pitch spellings such C♯ and D♭ refer to the same chroma. Enumerating the chroma values, one can identify the set of chroma values with the set of integers {1,2,...,12}, where 1 refers to chroma C, 2 to C♯, and so on. A pitch class is defined as the set of all pitches that share the same chroma. For example, using the scientific pitch notation, the pitch class corresponding to the chroma C is the set

{..., C_{−2}, C_{−1}, C_{0}, C_{1}, C_{2}, C_{3} ...}

consisting of all pitches separated by an integer number of octaves. Given a music representation (e.g. a musical score or an audio recording), the main idea of chroma features is to aggregate for a given local time window (e.g. specified in beats or in seconds) all information that relates to a given chroma into a single coefficient. Shifting the time window across the music representation results in a sequence of chroma features each expressing how the representation's pitch content within the time window is spread over the twelve chroma bands. The resulting time-chroma representation is also referred to as chromagram. The figure above shows chromagrams for a C-major scale, once obtained from a musical score and once from an audio recording. Because of the close relation between the terms chroma and pitch class, chroma features are also referred to as pitch class profiles.

== Applications ==
Identifying pitches that differ by an octave, chroma features show a high degree of robustness to variations in timbre and closely correlate to the musical aspect of harmony. This is the reason why chroma features are a well-established tool for processing and analyzing music data. For example, basically every chord recognition procedure relies on some kind of chroma representation. Also, chroma features have become the de facto standard for tasks such as music alignment and synchronization as well as audio structure analysis. Finally, chroma features have turned out to be a powerful mid-level feature representation in content-based audio retrieval such as cover song identification, audio matching or audio hashing.

== Computation of audio chromagrams ==
There are many ways for converting an audio recording into a chromagram. For example, the conversion of an audio recording into a chroma representation (or chromagram) may be performed either by using short-time Fourier transforms in combination with binning strategies or by employing suitable multirate filter banks. Furthermore, the properties of chroma features can be significantly changed by introducing suitable pre- and post-processing steps modifying spectral, temporal, and dynamical aspects. This leads to a large number of chroma variants, which may show a quite different behavior in the context of a specific music analysis scenario.

== See also ==
- Time-frequency analysis
- Time-frequency analysis for music signal
- Pitch (music)
- Musical theory
