= Choi–Williams distribution function =

Quadratic time-frequency representation

The Choi–Williams distribution function is a quadratic time-frequency representation belonging to Cohen's class. Introduced by H.-I. Choi and W. J. Williams in 1989, it uses an exponential kernel to reduce interference between signal components. The amount of attenuation depends on the positions of the interference terms in the ambiguity domain, and stronger smoothing can also change the concentration of the signal's auto-terms.

== Mathematical definition ==
Let $x(t)$ be a complex signal of finite energy, and use frequency measured in cycles per unit time. With the Fourier-transform convention
$$X(f)=\int_{\mathbb R}x(t)e^{-i2\pi ft}\,dt,$$
the centered correlation and ambiguity function are
$$R_x(u,\tau)=x(u+\tau/2)x^*(u-\tau/2),$$
$$A_x(\nu,\tau)=\int_{\mathbb R}R_x(u,\tau)e^{-i2\pi\nu u}\,du.$$
Here $\tau$ is delay, $\nu$ is Doppler frequency, and the asterisk denotes complex conjugation. The Choi–Williams distribution is
$$C_x^{(\alpha)}(t,f)=\iint_{\mathbb R^2}A_x(\nu,\tau)\Phi_\alpha(\nu,\tau)e^{i2\pi(\nu t-f\tau)}\,d\nu\,d\tau,$$
where
$$\Phi_\alpha(\nu,\tau)=\exp[-\alpha(\nu\tau)^2],\qquad\alpha>0.$$
This exponential-kernel convention is used in Ding's lecture notes on Cohen-class distributions. The multiplier acts on the ambiguity function before the inverse transform to the time-frequency plane. The constant multiplier $\Phi=1$ gives the Wigner distribution.

=== Equivalent time-lag representation ===
An equivalent representation is obtained by transforming the multiplier in its Doppler coordinate. For nonzero delay,
$$k_\alpha(v,\tau)=\int_{\mathbb R}\Phi_\alpha(\nu,\tau)e^{i2\pi\nu v}\,d\nu=\frac{\sqrt{\pi}}{\sqrt{\alpha}|\tau|}\exp\!\left[-\frac{\pi^2v^2}{\alpha\tau^2}\right].$$
The distribution can therefore be written as
$$C_x^{(\alpha)}(t,f)=\int_{\mathbb R}\left[\int_{\mathbb R}k_\alpha(t-u,\tau)R_x(u,\tau)\,du\right]e^{-i2\pi f\tau}\,d\tau.$$
The inner integral smooths the correlation in time using a Gaussian whose width depends on the delay. For each nonzero delay, the Gaussian kernel has unit integral in $v$. Its width tends to zero with the delay, and its zero-delay interpretation is the distributional limit $k_\alpha(v,0)=\delta(v)$. Thus the apparent division by $|\tau|$ is handled by a limiting kernel rather than by evaluating that quotient at zero.

== Kernel geometry and cross-term suppression ==
For a multicomponent signal, the quadratic correlation contains auto-terms from the individual components and cross-terms between different components. The Choi–Williams multiplier weights both types of terms in the ambiguity domain. On either coordinate axis it satisfies
$$\Phi_\alpha(0,\tau)=\Phi_\alpha(\nu,0)=1.$$
Away from the axes, its attenuation depends on the squared product $(\nu\tau)^2$. Consequently its pass region is cross-shaped rather than circular. Interference near either axis can remain prominent even when interference farther from the axes is strongly attenuated. The orientation of the signal components therefore affects the reduction of cross-terms. The Time-Frequency Toolbox tutorial illustrates this effect with Gaussian atoms arranged at different orientations in the time-frequency plane. In particular, components with equal time centers or equal frequency centers place their cross-ambiguity centers on an axis. Unit gain at such a center does not mean that every point of a finite-width cross-ambiguity lobe is unchanged: points away from the axis can still be attenuated. Increasing the attenuation may also change the auto-terms. Cross-term suppression and preservation of component concentration are therefore separate considerations.

Choi–Williams ambiguity-domain multiplier $\Phi(\nu,\tau)=\exp[-0.5(\nu\tau)^2]$. Its value is one on both coordinate axes.

Numerical illustrations for three pairs of Gaussian components. The columns use $\alpha=0$ (Wigner), $0.5$ and $8$ in $\Phi_\alpha(\nu,\tau)=\exp[-\alpha(\nu\tau)^2]$. Each row uses a common signed colour scale.

== Properties ==
=== Energy marginals ===
For sufficiently regular signals, the time marginal is
$$\int_{\mathbb R}C_x^{(\alpha)}(t,f)\,df=|x(t)|^2,$$
and the frequency marginal is
$$\int_{\mathbb R}C_x^{(\alpha)}(t,f)\,dt=|X(f)|^2.$$
The corresponding conditions on a Cohen-class multiplier are $\Phi(\nu,0)=1$ and $\Phi(0,\tau)=1$, respectively. The Choi–Williams multiplier satisfies both. These conditions follow by integrating the defining expression over one output coordinate. Integration over frequency selects zero delay, giving
$$\int_{\mathbb R}C_x^{(\alpha)}(t,f)\,df=\int_{\mathbb R}A_x(\nu,0)e^{i2\pi\nu t}\,d\nu=R_x(t,0).$$
Integration over time selects zero Doppler, giving
$$\int_{\mathbb R}C_x^{(\alpha)}(t,f)\,dt=\int_{\mathbb R}A_x(0,\tau)e^{-i2\pi f\tau}\,d\tau.$$
The latter expression is the Fourier transform of the signal's autocorrelation and equals its energy spectrum. In particular, the signed integral over the whole time-frequency plane equals the signal energy. Marginal preservation does not imply pointwise nonnegativity.

=== Reality and covariance ===
The ambiguity function satisfies the conjugate symmetry
$$A_x(-\nu,-\tau)=A_x(\nu,\tau)^*.$$
The exponential multiplier is real and unchanged by simultaneous reversal of its coordinates. The product $A_x\Phi_\alpha$ therefore has the conjugate symmetry required for a real-valued time-frequency distribution. For a translated and modulated signal
$$y(t)=e^{i2\pi f_0t}x(t-t_0),$$
the representation obeys
$$C_y^{(\alpha)}(t,f)=C_x^{(\alpha)}(t-t_0,f-f_0).$$
This is covariance under time and frequency shifts: the distribution shifts with the signal.

== Parameter conventions ==
Numerical parameter values must be interpreted using the kernel formula in which they appear. In the convention $\exp[-\alpha(\nu\tau)^2]$, larger $\alpha$ gives stronger attenuation away from the axes. As $\alpha\to0^+$, the multiplier tends to one, giving the Wigner limit. Hlawatsch and Boudreaux-Bartels use the convention
$$\Phi(\nu,\tau)=\exp\!\left[-\frac{(2\pi\nu\tau)^2}{\sigma_{\mathrm H}}\right].$$
Comparison of the exponents gives
$$\alpha=\frac{4\pi^2}{\sigma_{\mathrm H}}.$$
Their Gaussian time-lag kernel is the same kernel after this change of parameter. The Time-Frequency Toolbox tutorial uses
$$\Phi(\nu,\tau)=\exp\!\left[-\frac{(\pi\nu\tau)^2}{2\sigma_{\mathrm T}^{2}}\right],$$
which corresponds to
$$\alpha=\frac{\pi^2}{2\sigma_{\mathrm T}^{2}}.$$
In that convention, increasing $\sigma_{\mathrm T}$ reduces the attenuation. Parameters bearing the same name in different references thus need not represent the same degree of smoothing. The balance between interference reduction and auto-term distortion depends on the signal as well as on the chosen convention.

== See also ==
- Cone-shape distribution function
- Wigner distribution function
- Ambiguity function
- Short-time Fourier transform
