= Cone-shape distribution function =

Quadratic time-frequency representation

The cone-shape distribution function, also called the Zhao–Atlas–Marks distribution or ZAM distribution, is a quadratic time-frequency representation in Cohen's class. It was introduced by Yunxin Zhao, Les E. Atlas and Robert J. Marks II in 1990. Its name refers to the support of the smoothing kernel in the time-lag plane. The cone constraint permits temporal smoothing while retaining finite time support, and the choice of lag weighting affects interference suppression and spectral behavior. The original cone kernel and an interval-normalized cone have different ambiguity multipliers, so their marginal properties must be distinguished.

== Mathematical definition ==
For a complex signal $x(t)$, define the centered correlation
$$R_x(u,\tau)=x(u+\tau/2)x^*(u-\tau/2)$$
and its time Fourier transform
$$A_x(\nu,\tau)=\int_{\mathbb R}R_x(u,\tau)e^{-i2\pi\nu u}\,du.$$
The variables $\tau$ and $\nu$ denote delay and Doppler frequency, respectively. Using the Fourier convention $X(f)=\int x(t)e^{-i2\pi ft}\,dt$, a time-lag kernel $k$ defines
$$C_k(t,f)=\iint_{\mathbb R^2}k(t-u,\tau)R_x(u,\tau)e^{-i2\pi f\tau}\,du\,d\tau.$$
Its equivalent ambiguity-domain multiplier is
$$\Phi(\nu,\tau)=\int_{\mathbb R}k(v,\tau)e^{-i2\pi\nu v}\,dv,$$
where $v=t-u$ is a time displacement. Accordingly,
$$C_k(t,f)=\iint_{\mathbb R^2}A_x(\nu,\tau)\Phi(\nu,\tau)e^{i2\pi(\nu t-f\tau)}\,d\nu\,d\tau.$$
These are equivalent kernel descriptions of a Cohen-class representation.

=== Original cone kernel ===
The continuous kernel specified by Zhao, Atlas and Marks has the form
$$k_{g,a}(v,\tau)=g(\tau)\,\mathbf 1_{\{|v|\le |\tau|/a\}},\qquad a\ge2,$$
where $g$ is a lag weighting function and $a$ controls the cone opening. For $a=2$, this yields
$$Z_g(t,f)=\int_{\mathbb R}g(\tau)\left[\int_{t-|\tau|/2}^{t+|\tau|/2}R_x(u,\tau)\,du\right]e^{-i2\pi f\tau}\,d\tau.$$
The width of the inner integration interval is $|\tau|$. With the normalized sinc convention
$$\operatorname{sinc}(z)=\frac{\sin(\pi z)}{\pi z},\qquad\operatorname{sinc}(0)=1,$$
the ambiguity multiplier is
$$\Phi_g(\nu,\tau)=g(\tau)|\tau|\operatorname{sinc}(\nu\tau).$$
The factor $|\tau|$ is present in the cone-kernel multiplier tabulated by Hlawatsch and Boudreaux-Bartels.

=== Normalized cone and Gaussian lag weighting ===
An interval-normalized cone instead uses
$$\widetilde k_h(v,\tau)=\frac{h(\tau)}{|\tau|}\,\mathbf 1_{\{|v|\le |\tau|/2\}},\qquad\tau\ne0.$$
For $h(\tau)=\exp(-2\pi\alpha\tau^2)$, the corresponding multiplier is
$$\widetilde\Phi_\alpha(\nu,\tau)=\operatorname{sinc}(\nu\tau)\exp(-2\pi\alpha\tau^2),\qquad\alpha\ge0.$$
This normalized Gaussian form is given in Ding's course notes. The Fourier transform of the normalized interval is
$$\frac{1}{|\tau|}\int_{-|\tau|/2}^{|\tau|/2}e^{-i2\pi\nu v}\,dv=\operatorname{sinc}(\nu\tau).$$
The absolute value in the denominator is needed because the interval length is positive for both signs of the delay. At zero delay, the normalized average is interpreted by its limit; for continuous correlations and $h(0)=1$, this limit is $R_x(t,0)$.

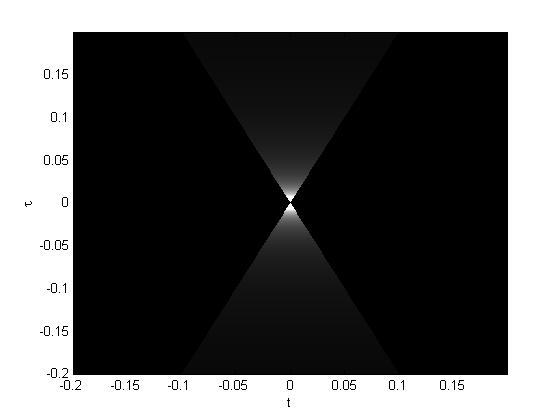
Magnitude illustration of a cone-shaped time-lag kernel.

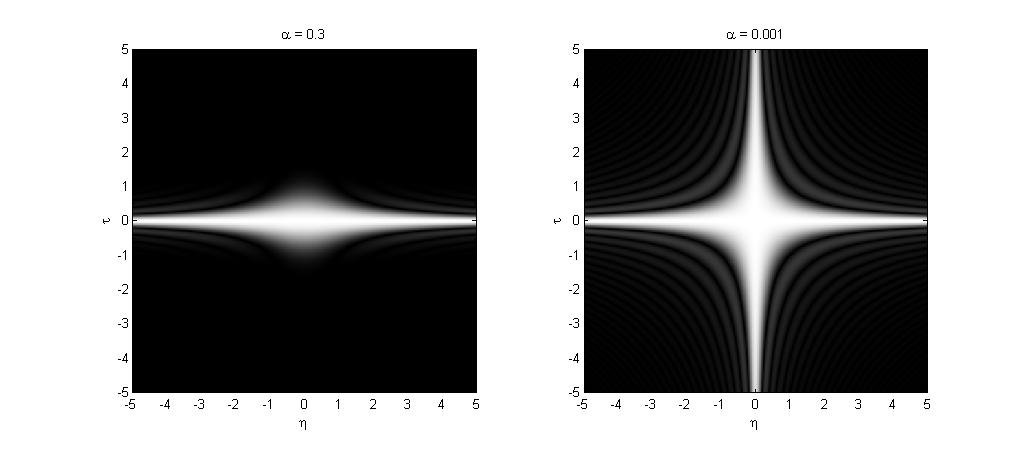
Magnitude illustrations of the normalized ambiguity kernel with different Gaussian weighting parameters.

=== Relationship to the Born–Jordan distribution ===
For $h=1$, the normalized interval kernel is the Born–Jordan distribution. Its ambiguity multiplier is
$$\Phi_{\mathrm{BJ}}(\nu,\tau)=\operatorname{sinc}(\nu\tau).$$
Published comparisons list this normalized kernel separately from the original regular-weight cone kernel $g(\tau)\mathbf 1_{\{|v|\le|\tau|/2\}}$. For a general lag taper, the normalized multiplier is
$$\widetilde\Phi_h(\nu,\tau)=h(\tau)\operatorname{sinc}(\nu\tau).$$
Multiplication by $h$ in delay corresponds to convolution in output frequency with the Fourier transform of $h$. For the Gaussian-normalized model, setting $\alpha=0$ therefore gives the Born–Jordan distribution. It does not give the Wigner distribution, whose multiplier is the constant one.

Normalized cone multipliers $\exp(-\beta\tau^2)\operatorname{sinc}(\nu\tau)$, with $\beta=0$ on the left and $\beta=2\,\mathrm{s}^{-2}$ on the right. The $\beta=0$ case is the Born–Jordan multiplier.

Four continuous time–frequency representations of the same Gaussian signal: Wigner, Born–Jordan, a normalized Gaussian-tapered cone, and an original regular-taper cone. Each panel has its own signed colour scale; the original and normalized kernels have different dimensional scaling.

== Properties ==
=== Marginals and normalization ===
For a Cohen-class representation, the time-marginal condition is $\Phi(\nu,0)=1$, whereas the frequency-marginal condition is $\Phi(0,\tau)=1$. For the normalized kernel with $h(0)=1$, the first condition gives
$$\int_{\mathbb R}\widetilde C_h(t,f)\,df=|x(t)|^2.$$
The frequency integral is a signed integral; it is not the integral of the magnitude of the distribution. The frequency marginal depends on the lag taper:
$$\int_{\mathbb R}\widetilde C_h(t,f)\,dt=\int_{\mathbb R}h(\tau)A_x(0,\tau)e^{-i2\pi f\tau}\,d\tau.$$
Without a taper, $h=1$, this equals $|X(f)|^2$. With Gaussian lag weighting, it is a frequency-smoothed energy spectrum. These statements concern the normalized model. The original regular-weight cone has the additional factor $|\tau|$ in its multiplier, so the same marginal statements cannot be assigned to it without checking its weighting convention.

=== Finite time support ===
The cone constraint relates the smoothing displacement to the delay:
$$|t-u|\le |\tau|/2.$$
It preserves finite time support outside a containing interval: if the signal vanishes outside $[a,b]$, a nonzero correlation requires
$$a+|\tau|/2\le u\le b-|\tau|/2.$$
Combining these inequalities with the cone constraint restricts the output time to $a\le t\le b$. This containing-interval property does not by itself guarantee that every gap inside the interval remains empty. The original work treats the relationship between lag-window length and the representation of separated signal segments.

=== Reality and shifts ===
A real even lag weighting gives the time-lag symmetry
$$k(v,-\tau)=k(v,\tau)^*,$$
which, together with the conjugate symmetry of the signal correlation, gives a real-valued distribution. Real-valuedness does not imply nonnegativity; negative spectral sidelobes occur in the original cone-kernel construction. For a fixed kernel and a signal $y(t)=e^{i2\pi f_0t}x(t-t_0)$, the distribution is covariant:
$$C_y(t,f)=C_x(t-t_0,f-f_0).$$
This property expresses a shift of the output with the input signal.

== Cross-term suppression ==
The behavior of the Gaussian-normalized cone is determined in part by its values on the two ambiguity axes:
$$\widetilde\Phi_\alpha(0,\tau)=e^{-2\pi\alpha\tau^2},\qquad\widetilde\Phi_\alpha(\nu,0)=1.$$
For positive $\alpha$, weighting decays along the delay axis, while the Doppler axis has unit gain. For two translated and modulated Gaussian components with center differences $\Delta t$ and $\Delta f$, the cross-ambiguity lobes are centered at opposite points with coordinates $(\nu,\tau)=(\Delta f,\Delta t)$. Equal-frequency components separated in time therefore have their cross-lobe centers on the delay axis. Equal-time components separated in frequency have their cross-lobe centers on the Doppler axis. These two arrangements should be distinguished when interpreting the directional behavior of the kernel. A Gaussian lag weighting attenuates finite nonzero delays but is not a compact cutoff. Complete suppression of a particular cross-term requires conditions on the correlation and weighting; it does not follow solely from choosing a positive Gaussian parameter. Changing the lag weighting also changes the signal's auto-terms and spectral resolution.

== Numerical implementation ==
The original discrete construction evaluates lag-dependent sums of signal products and then applies a Fourier transform in delay. The Time-Frequency Toolbox includes a ZAM routine, tfrzam, alongside a Born–Jordan routine. The two routines correspond to different kernel definitions; their names do not remove the need to specify normalization and delay sampling. In particular, the discrete lag index in products of the form $x[n+m]x^*[n-m]$ represents a physical separation of $2m$ sample intervals.

== See also ==
- Cohen's class distribution function
- Choi-Williams distribution function
- Wigner distribution function
- Ambiguity function
- Short-time Fourier transform
