= List of Portuguese words of Italian origin =

A list of loanwords from the Italian language into the Portuguese language, also called italianisms. According to the Dicionário Universal da Lingua Portuguesa, there are 535 known and registered italianisms in the Portuguese language.

== A ==
- ágio (agio)
- alarme (all'arme) - en.: alarm
- alerta (all'erta) - en.: alert
- andante (andante)
- antepasto (antipasto)
- arcada (arcate) - en.: arcade
- ária (aria)
- aquarela (acquarella) - en.: watercolour
- arlequim (Arlecchino)
- arpejo (arpeggio)

== B ==
- bagatela (bagatella) - en.: bagatelle
- baldaquim (baldacchino)
- banquete (banchetta) - en.: banquet
- barista (barista)
- batalhão (battaglione) - en.: battalion
- batuta (battuta)
- belvedere (belvedere)
- bisonho (bisogno)
- boletim (bollettino) - en.: bulletin
- bravata (bravata)
- brócolo (broccoli)
- bufão (buffone) - en.: buffoon

== C ==
- camerlengo (camerlengo)
- cantata (cantata)
- capricho (capriccio)
- capuchino (cappuccino)
- caricatura (caricatura)
- carnaval (carnevale) - en.: carnival
- carpete (carpita) - en.: carpet
- carroça (carrozza)
- carroceria (carrozzeria)
- cartucho (cartoccio) - en.: cartridge
- cascata (cascata) - en.: cascade
- cassino (casino)
- charlatão (ciarlatano)
- ciabata (ciabatta)
- cicerone (cicerone)
- comparsa (comparsa)
- concerto (concerto)
- contralto (contralto)
- coronel (colonnello) - en.: colonel
- cortejar (corteggiare) - en.: courting
- cortesã (cortigiana) - en.: courtesan

== D ==
- desenho (disegno) - en.: design
- desfaçatez (sfacciatezza)
- diletante (dilettante)
- diva (diva)
- doge (doge)
- dona (donna)
- domo (duomo) - en.: dome
- dueto (duetto) - en.: duet

== E ==
- embrulho (imbroglio)
- entalhe (intaglio)
- empresário (impresario)
- esbirro (sbirro)
- esboço (sbozzo)
- escaramuça (scaramuccia)
- escopeta (scopetta)
- escorchar (scorciare)
- esdrúxulo (sdrucciolo)
- esfumar (sfumare)
- esparguete (spaghetti)
- esquadra (squadra) - en.: squad
- esquadrão (squadrone) - en.: squadron
- esquete (schizzo) - en.: sketch
- esquife (schifo) - en.: skiff
- esquifoso (schifoso)
- estafar (staffare)
- estafermo (stafermo)
- estância (stanza)
- estileto (stiletto)
- estravagância (stravaganza)
- estropear (stroppiare)
- estudio (studio)
- estuque (stucco)
- espresso (espresso)

== F ==
- fachada (facciata) - en.: facade
- faiança (Faenza)
- fanal (fanale)
- farsa (farce) - en.: farce
- fascismo (fascismo) - en.: fascism
- feltro (feltro) - en.: felt
- festa (festa) - en.: fest, party
- festejar (festeggiare)
- fiasco (fare fiasco) - en.: fiasco
- filigrana (filigrana)
- fólio (foglio)
- fosso (fosso)
- fragata (fregata) - en.: frigate
- fresco (fresco)
- fuga (fuga)

== G ==
- galeria (galleria) - en.: wikt:gallery
- gazeta (gazzetta) - en.: gazette
- gesso (gesso)
- girafa (giraffa) - en.: giraffe
- gôndola (gondola)
- grafite (graffiti)
- granito (granito) - en.: granite
- grotesco (grottesco) - en.: grotesque
- grupo (gruppo) - en.: group
- gueto (ghetto)

== I ==
- Índigo (indaco) - en.: indigo
- infantaria (infanteria) - en.: infantry
- inferno (inferno)
- informática (informatica) - informatics

== L ==
- laguna (laguna)
- lasanha (lasagna)
- lava (lava)
- lazareto (lazaretto) - en.: lazaret
- libreto (libretto)
- loja (loggia)
- loteria (lotteria) - lottery

== M ==
- macarrão (maccherone) - en.: macaroni
- madona (madonna)
- madrigal (madrigale) - en.: madrigal
- maestro (maestro)
- máfia (mafia)
- mafioso (mafioso)
- magazine (magazzino) - en.: magazine
- magenta (Magenta)
- magnífico (magnifico) - en.: magnificent
- malandro (malandrino)
- malária (malaria)
- maneirismo (manierismo) - en.: mannerism
- maquiavélico (macchiavellico)
- marrasquino (maraschino)
- medalha (medaglia) - en.: medal
- melodrama (melodramma) - en.: melodrama
- merengue (Marengo)
- mezanino (mezzanino) - en.: mezzanine
- miniatura (miniatura) - en.: miniature
- moçarela (mozzarella)
- modelo (modello) - en.: model
- mortadela (mortadella)
- mosquete (moschetto) - en.: musket
- mussolina (mussolina) - en.: muslin

== N ==
- namorado (innamorato) - en.: enamored
- neutrino (neutrino)
- nhoque (gnocchi)

== O ==
- ocarina (ocarina)

== P ==
- palhaço (pagliaccio) - en.: clown
- panetone (panettone)
- parmesão (parmigiano) - en.: parmesan
- partitura (partitura)
- pastiche (pasticcio)
- pérola (perla) - en.: pearl
- pedante (pedante) - en.: pedant
- pelagra (pellagra)
- peperone (peperoni)
- pergola (pergola)
- piano (piano)
- pícolo (piccolo)
- pilastra (pilastro) - en.: pilaster
- piloto (pilota) - pilot
- pistáquio (pistacchio)
- pistola (Pistoia)
- pizza (pizza)
- pizzaria (pizzeria)
- polenta (polenta)
- Porcelana (porcellana) - en.: porcelain
- portifólio (portafoglio) - en.: portfolio
- postilhão (postiglione) - en.: postillion
- propaganda (propaganda)
- provolone (provolone)

== R ==
- raça (razza) - race
- ravióli (ravioli)
- regata (regata)
- ricota (ricotta)
- risoto (risotto)
- rúcula (rugola, rughetta)

== S ==
- salame (salame)
- salsicha (salsicce)
- saltimbanco (saltimbanco)
- sedã (sede) - en.: sedan
- semolina (semolino) - en.: semolina
- sentinela (sentinella) - en.: sentinel
- serenata (serenata)
- siena (Siena)
- sinfonia (sinfonia) - en.: symphony
- solfejo (solfeggio)
- solo (solo)
- sonata (sonata)
- soneto (sonneto) = en.: sonnet
- soprano (soprano)

== T ==
- tafetá (taffettà)
- talharim (taglierini)
- tarô (tarocchi) - tarot
- tchau (ciao)
- tenor (tenore) - en.: tenor
- terracota (terracotta)
- tômbola (tombola)
- torso (torso)
- trampolim (trampolino) - en.: trampoline
- travertino (travertino) - en.: travertine
- trombone (trombone)
- truco (trucco)
- tutifrúti (tutti-frutti)

== V ==
- viola (viola)
- violino (violino)
- violoncelo (violoncello)

== Z ==
- zero (zero)

== Sources ==
- Partially extracted and translated from: Sabbatini, R.M.E.: Contribuições do Idioma Italiano ao Português: Estrangeirismos que Ficaram. Monografia, Instituto Edumed, Campinas, Agosto 2007 (reproduced by permission of the author). Available on the Internet (In Portuguese).
- Dicionário Universal da Lingua Portuguesa. Editora Priberam, Portugal. Available on the Internet
