= List of Spanish words borrowed from Italian =

This is a list of Spanish words of Italian origin. It is further divided into words that come from contemporary Italian and from colloquial Italian in Spanish. Some of these words have alternate etymologies and may also appear on a list of Spanish words borrowed from a different language.

== Italian ==
Since the Middle Ages the Italian Maritime Republics (mainly the Republic of Genova) have influenced the Spanish language. But the biggest borrowings happened during the Italian Renaissance centuries. The following is a small list of these borrowings:

- alarme (all'arme) – en.: alarm
- alerta (all'erta) – en.: alert
- andante (andante)
- antepasto (antipasto)
- arcada (arcate) – en.: arcade
- ária (aria)
- aquarelo (acquarella) – en.: watercolour
- atarantar
- arpegio (arpeggio)
- azufre
- bajo
- balcón
- balón
- banquete (banchetto) – en.: banquet
- barista (barista)
- batallon (battaglione) – en.: battalion
- batuta (battuta)
- belvedere (belvedere)
- boletin (bollettino) – en.: bulletin
- bravada (bravata)
- birra (birra) – en.: beer
- brújula
- cantata (cantata)
- capitán (capitano) – .en: captain
- capricho (capriccio)
- capuchino (cappuccino)
- caricatura (caricatura)
- carnaval (carnevale) – en.: carnival
- centinela
- chelo
- charlar
- charlatan
- commando
- comparsa
- contrabando
- cúpula
- daga
- escorzo
- espagueti
- estropear
- fachada
- fiesta (festa) – en.: fest, party
- fiasco (fare fiasco) – en.: fiasco
- fragata (fregata) – en.: frigate
- galeria (galleria) – en.: wikt:gallery
- gazetin (gazzetta) – en.: gazette
- girafa (giraffa) – en.: giraffe
- gondola (gondola)
- grafito (graffiti)
- granito (granito) – en.: granite
- grotesco (grottesco) – en.: grotesque
- grupo (gruppo) – en.: group
- gueto (ghetto)
- laburar
- lasaña
- lava
- miniatura (miniatura) – en.: miniature
- modelo (modello) – en.: model
- millón
- mufa
- niña (nonna) Grandma or girl
- ñoqui
- novella
- opera
- pavana
- piano
- pizza
- porcelana (porcellana) – en.: porcelain
- radio
- remolacha
- sémola
- sentinela (sentinella) – en.: sentinel
- serenata (serenata)
- sinfonia (sinfonia) – en.: symphony
- solfejo (solfeggio)
- solo (solo)
- sonata (sonata)
- soneto (sonneto) = en.: sonnet
- soprano (soprano)
- tenor (tenore) – en.: tenor
- terracota (terracotta)
- tombola (tombola)
- torso (torso)
- trampolim (trampolino) – en.: trampoline
- travertino (travertino) – en.: travertine
- truco (trucco)
- tutifrúti (tutti-frutti)
- viola (viola)
- violino (violino)
- violoncelo (violoncello)
- zero (zero)

== Colloquial Italian-Spanish ==
The Italian emigrants in Argentina, Uruguay, Venezuela, Colombia, and Ecuador have enriched the local Spanish language. In countries like Argentina and Uruguay they even created their own dialects, like the Cocoliche and the Lunfardo. Indeed, the "lunfardo" word comes from a deformation of "lombardo", an Italian dialect (from Lombardia) spoken by northern Italian emigrants to the Buenos Aires region. Other local dialects in Latinoamerica created by the Italian emigrants are the Talian dialect in Brazil and the Chipilo dialect in Mexico.

The following is a small list:

- Anchoa (Italian dialect -Genoese- ancioa)
- Birra. Beer. From "Birra".
- Calarse. To digest (or sustain) something bad. From "Calarsi" with the same meaning.
- Chao. Friendly salute. From "Ciao" (English: Hi).
- Contorno. Side dish. From "Contorno".
- Fiaca. (Buenos Aires Lunfardo) Laziness, or lazy person (from the Italian fiacca "laziness, sluggishness")
- Fungi (Argentinian Cocoliche). Mushroom. From "Fungo"
- Gafo. Stupid. From "Cafone" (low class peasant).
- Laburar (Rioplatense Spanish), from Italian lavorare, = "to work"
- Mafioso. Criminal. From "Mafioso".
- Milanesa. Food. From "Milanese" (a food made with meat and bread).
- Mina. (Buenos Aires Lunfardo), an informal word for woman (from Lombard dialect)
- Mortadela. Food. From "Mortadella" (a food made from pork and chicken)
- Mufa (Rioplatense Spanish) = "bad luck", from Italian muffa (mildew)
- Pasticho. From "pasticcio" (a lasagna).
- Pibe (Rioplatense Spanish), from Italian dialect pive ("piccino")
- Salute (Argentinian Cocoliche). Greetings. From "Saluti"
- Terraza. Balcony. From "Terrazza".

== See also ==
- Linguistic history of Spanish
- List of Spanish words of French origin
- List of Portuguese words of Italian origin
- List of English words of Spanish origin
- Cocoliche
- Lunfardo
