= Informatics (disambiguation) =

Informatics is the study of the structure, behaviour, and interactions of natural and engineered computational systems.

Informatics may refer to:

- Computer science, the scientific study of algorithms, information and computation
- Computing, any goal-oriented activity requiring, benefiting from, or creating computers
- Computer engineering (called technical informatics), the creating of computing hardware
- Information science, an interdisciplinary study of information
- Data science, the field related to data analysis and data engineering
- Information technology, the study, design, development, implementation, support, or management of computer-based information systems,
- Cognitive science, study of information processing in natural systems (called 'cognitive informatics')
- Computational science, solving computational problems in natural sciences
- Information engineering
- Engineering informatics (not to be confused with informatics engineering, Southern European term)
- Library science
- Informatics (band) electronic band from Melbourne, Australia formed in 1978

== Other uses ==
- Informatics General, previously Informatics, Inc., leading independent software company 1962-1985
- Informatics Europe, an association for European PhD-granting computer and information science departments
- Informatics for Consumer Health, a U.S. governmental health body
- Informatics Corporation of America, a U.S. healthcare information company
- Informatics Forum, major building at University of Edinburgh
- Informatics.nic.in, a quarterly e-Governance publication
- Informatics Institute of Technology, educational entity in Sri Lanka
- Informatics Philippines, an educational institution

== See also ==
- Informetrics
- Info-metrics
