= Ioannis Amanatidis (politician) =

Greek politician and teacher

- Ιωάννης Αμανατίδης
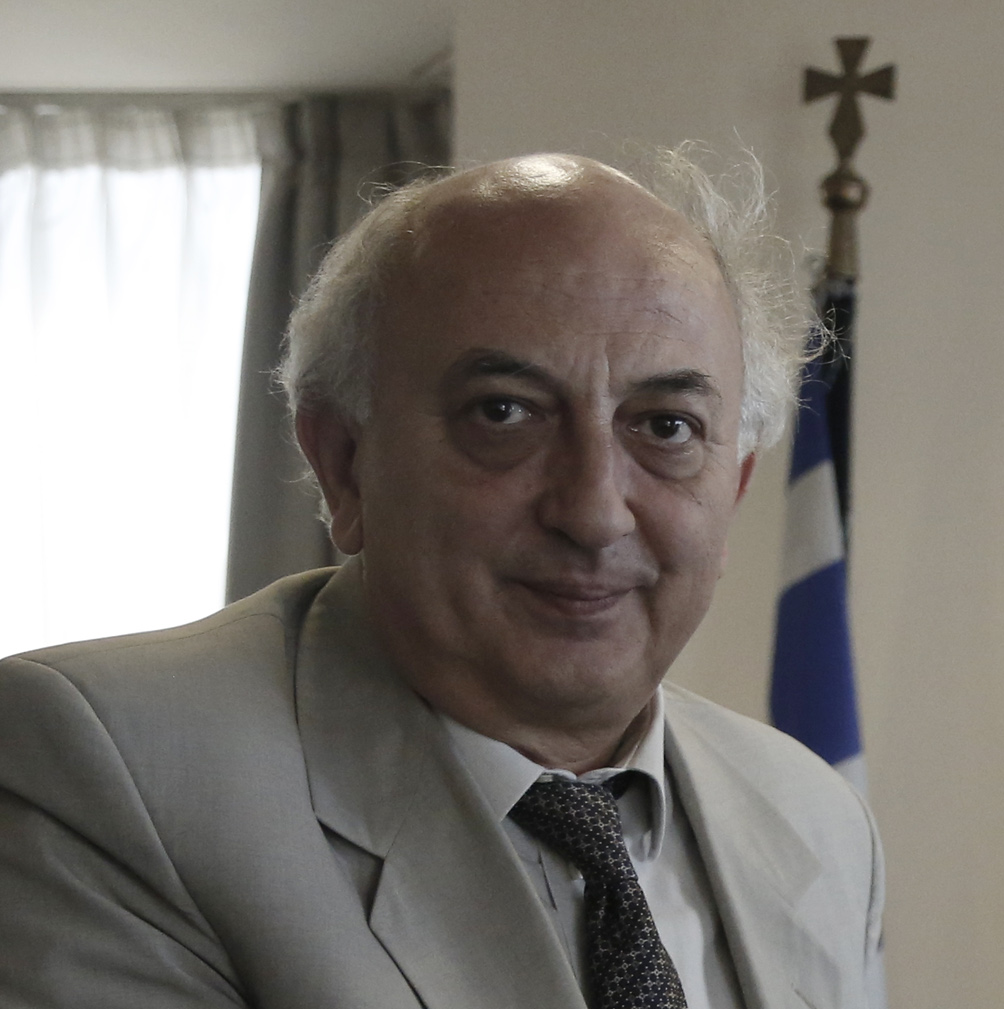

Deputy Minister of Foreign Affairs
- In office 23 September 2015 – 29 August 2018
- Prime Minister: Alexis Tsipras
- Minister: Nikos Kotzias

Alternate Minister of Foreign Affairs
- In office 17 July 2015 – 28 August 2015
- Prime Minister: Alexis Tsipras
- Minister: Nikos Kotzias

Member of the Hellenic Parliament for Thessaloniki A
- Incumbent
- Assumed office 6 May 2012

Personal details
- Born: 1961 (age 64–65) Kilkis, Greece
- Party: Syriza
- Education: TEI Kavala
- Profession: Teacher

Ioannis Amanatidis (born 1961) is a Greek politician and teacher who served as a Deputy Minister of Foreign Affairs in the second Tsipras cabinet and Member of the Hellenic Parliament (MP) for Thessaloniki A.

== Early life and education ==
Amanatidis was born in Kilkis in 1961. Both of his parents were teachers. He lived in Terpni, Serres until 1978, and has since lived in Thessaloniki. He graduated from the Oil and Chemical Department of the Technological Educational Institute of Kavala in 1981 and from the Teachers' Training College of Thessaloniki in 1985.

== Professional career ==
Amanatidis has worked as a primary school teacher in Thessaloniki since 1985. Since 1996, he has been a member of the Teachers' Association in Kalamaria, a General Secretary of the Teachers' Association in Thessaloniki, a member of the Executive Committee of EDOTH/Civil Servants' Confederation (ADEDY) and a representative in general meetings of the DOE, EDOTH and ADEDY.

== Political career ==
Amanatidis was a member of Synaspismos before joining Syriza. He currently sits on the Central Committee of Syriza. Amanatidis was first elected as a Member of the Hellenic Parliament (MP) for Syriza, representing Thessaloniki A, in the May 2012 election, and has been re-elected in every legislative election since. As an MP, Amanatidis served on the Parliamentary Standing Committee on Educational Affairs, the Special Permanent Committee on Research and Technology and chaired the Parliamentary Special Permanent Committee on Greeks Abroad. In opposition, he was Syriza's spokesman on religion and religious issues. He is currently the Alternate Secretary of the Interparliamentary Assembly on Orthodoxy.

Following a cabinet reshuffle on 17 July 2015 in the first Tsipras cabinet, Amanatidis was appointed as an Alternate Minister of Foreign Affairs. In the second Tsipras cabinet he was appointed as a Deputy Minister of Foreign Affairs.

== Personal life ==
Amanatidis is married to Stamatia Moustaka, a teacher, and is a father of two children.
