= Technological Educational Institute of Western Macedonia =

Institute of higher education based in Kozani, Greece

Coordinates: 40.322°N 21.791°E

- Τεχνολογικό Εκπαιδευτικό Ίδρυμα Δυτικής Μακεδονίας
- Former names: Technological Educational Institute of Kozani (1983–1999). Center for Higher Technical-Vocational Education (KATEE) of Kozani (1977–1983). Center for Higher Technical Education (ΚΑΤΕ) of Kozani in (1976–1977).
- Type: Public; Higher Education; Greece University System; University of Applied Sciences
- Active: 1976–2019
- Affiliations: University of Macedonia, Polytechnic University of Catalonia, Ternopil National Economic University
- Rector: Ganatsios Stergios
- Location: Kozani (main campus), Florina, Grevena, Kastoria, Ptolemaida, Greece
- Website: www.teiwm.gr

The Technological Educational Institute of Western Macedonia (TEIWM; Greek: Τεχνολογικό Εκπαιδευτικό Ίδρυμα Δυτικής Μακεδονίας, ΤΕΙΔΜ; formerly Technological Educational Institute of Kozani, TEIKOZ, Τεχνολογικό Εκπαιδευτικό Ίδρυμα Κοζάνης, TEIKOZ) was a state-run institute of highest education based in Kozani, Western Macedonia, Greece.

The institution also operated satellite campuses in the nearby towns of Kastoria, Florina, Grevena and Ptolemaida.

== History ==
The Technological Educational Institute of Kozani (TEIKOZ) had originally been founded as a Center for Higher Technical Education (ΚΑΤΕ) of Kozani in 1976 by Presidential Decree 748/13-10-1976 (Government Gazette 272/A/14-10-1976), after re-established as Center for Higher Technical-Vocational Education (KATEE) of Kozani (1977–1983) by the Law 576/7-4-1977 (Government Gazette 102/A/13-4-1977). It was established with its official name Technological Educational Institute of Kozani (TEIKOZ) in 1983 by the Law 1404/1983 (Government Gazette 173/Α/24-11-1983). After it renamed Technological Educational Institute of Western Macedonia (TEIWM). It was accredited as a Higher in 1983 and later Highest educational institution in 2001. A series of legislative acts solidified the equality of universities of applied sciences with Greek universities (Law 2916/2001, Law 3549/2007, Law 3685/2008, Law 3794/2009, Law 4001/2011).

On the 25th of February in 2019, Technological Educational Institute of Western Macedonia merged with the University of Western Macedonia with its main campus in Kozani.

== Schools and departments ==
The university includes four Schools, consisting of eleven Departments.

Schools	Departments
School of Engineering (Kozani)	Department of Mechanical Engineering and Industrial Design; Department of Electrical Engineering; Department of Environmental Engineering; Department Informatics Engineering (Kastoria); Department of Digital Media and Communication (Kastoria)
School of Business and Finance (Kozani)	Department of Business Administration; Department of Accounting and Finance; Department of International Trade; Department of Business Administration (Grevena)
School of Agriculture Technology, Food Technology and Nutrition	Department of Agricultural Technology (Florina)
School of Health and Welfare	Department of Midwifery (Ptolemaida)

== Academic evaluation ==
In 2016 the external evaluation committee gave TEI of Western Macedonia a Positive evaluation.

The ATHENA Reform Plan restructured the institute's departments in 2013.

== See also ==
- University of Western Macedonia
- List of universities in Greece
- TEI of Central Macedonia
