= International Hellenic University =

Greek institution of education

- Διεθνές Πανεπιστήμιο της Ελλάδος
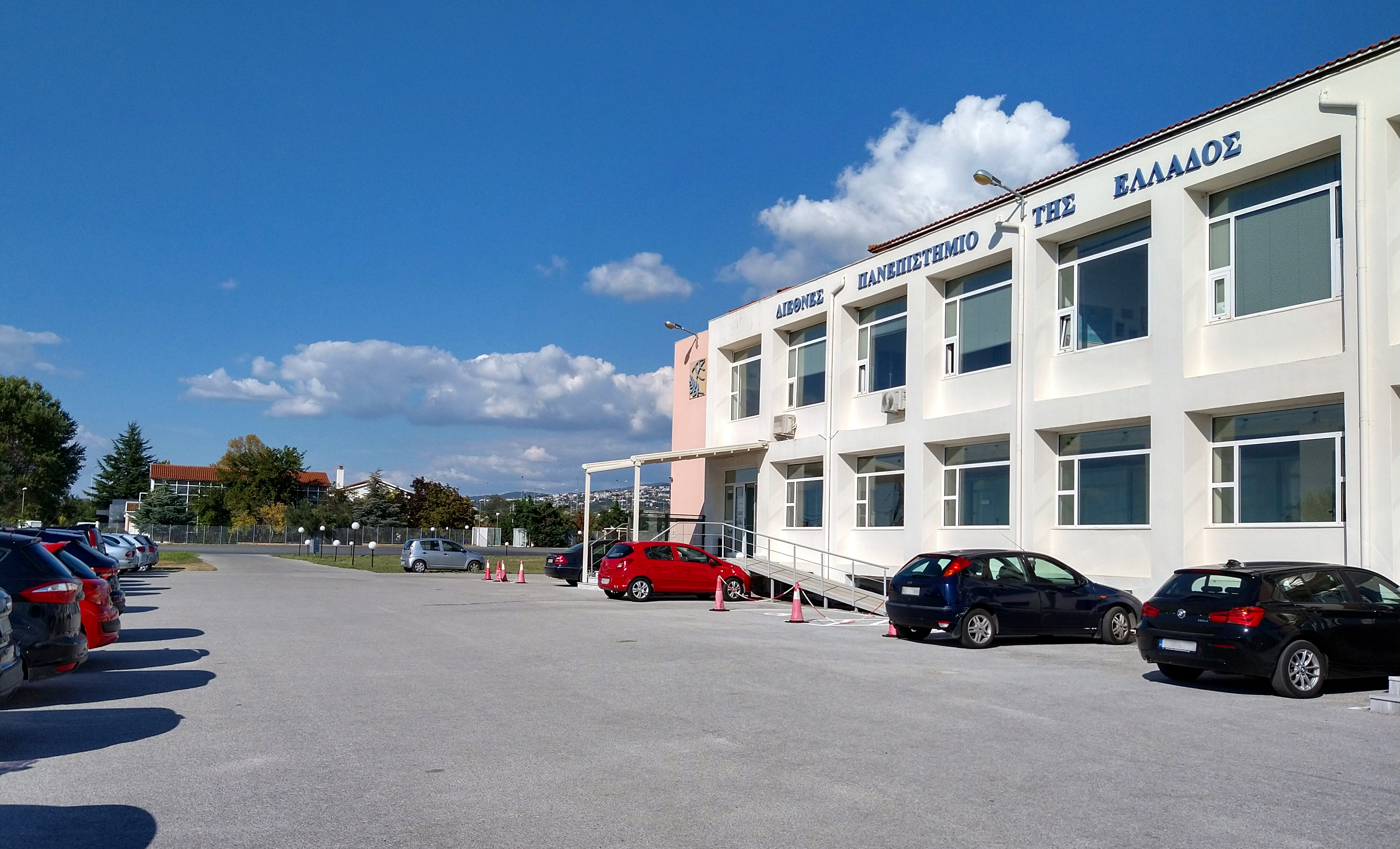
- Main campus in the outskirts of Thermi
- Type: Public higher education institution
- Established: 2005; 21 years ago / 2019; 7 years ago
- Budget: € 5.39 million (2021)
- Rector: Stamatis Angelopoulos
- Academic staff: 468
- Total staff: 1560 FTE
- Undergraduates: 53,000
- Postgraduates: 3,000
- Doctoral students: 300 (estimate)
- Location: Mainly Thessaloniki, Greece
- Campus: * Thermi (main and administrative site) - 16,000 square metres (170,000 ft^{2}); Sindos - 64.75 square kilometres (25.00 mi^{2}); Katerini; Kilkis - 28,000 square metres (300,000 ft^{2}); Serres - 233,650 square metres (2,515,000 ft^{2})
- Language: Greek, English
- Website: ihu.gr

The International Hellenic University (IHU; Greek: Διεθνές Πανεπιστήμιο της Ελλάδος, ΔΙΠΑΕ) is a public university in Greece. It was initially established in 2005 and was based solely in the Thermi suburb of Thessaloniki. Major structural reforms took place in 2019 and it now consists of several campuses across multiple cities in Central Macedonia, with the largest being in the Sindos suburb of Thessaloniki and the others in the cities of Serres, Katerini, and Kilkis.

== History ==
The International Hellenic University was initially established in October 2005 and was exclusively based in Thessaloniki, Greece. It was Greece's first public university where programmes were taught exclusively in English and it was composed of three schools, offering twenty-four master programmes.

The university's structure was reformed in 2019, now incorporating the three TEIs from Northern Greece (the Alexander Technological Educational Institute of Thessaloniki, the TEI of Central Macedonia and the TEI of Eastern Macedonia and Thrace). The final university structure resulted into nine schools and thirty-three departments, with campuses scattered across nine cities (Katerini, Kilkis, Sindos, Serres, Thermi). The main funds for the university operations come from the Greek state and the European Union.

== Organization ==
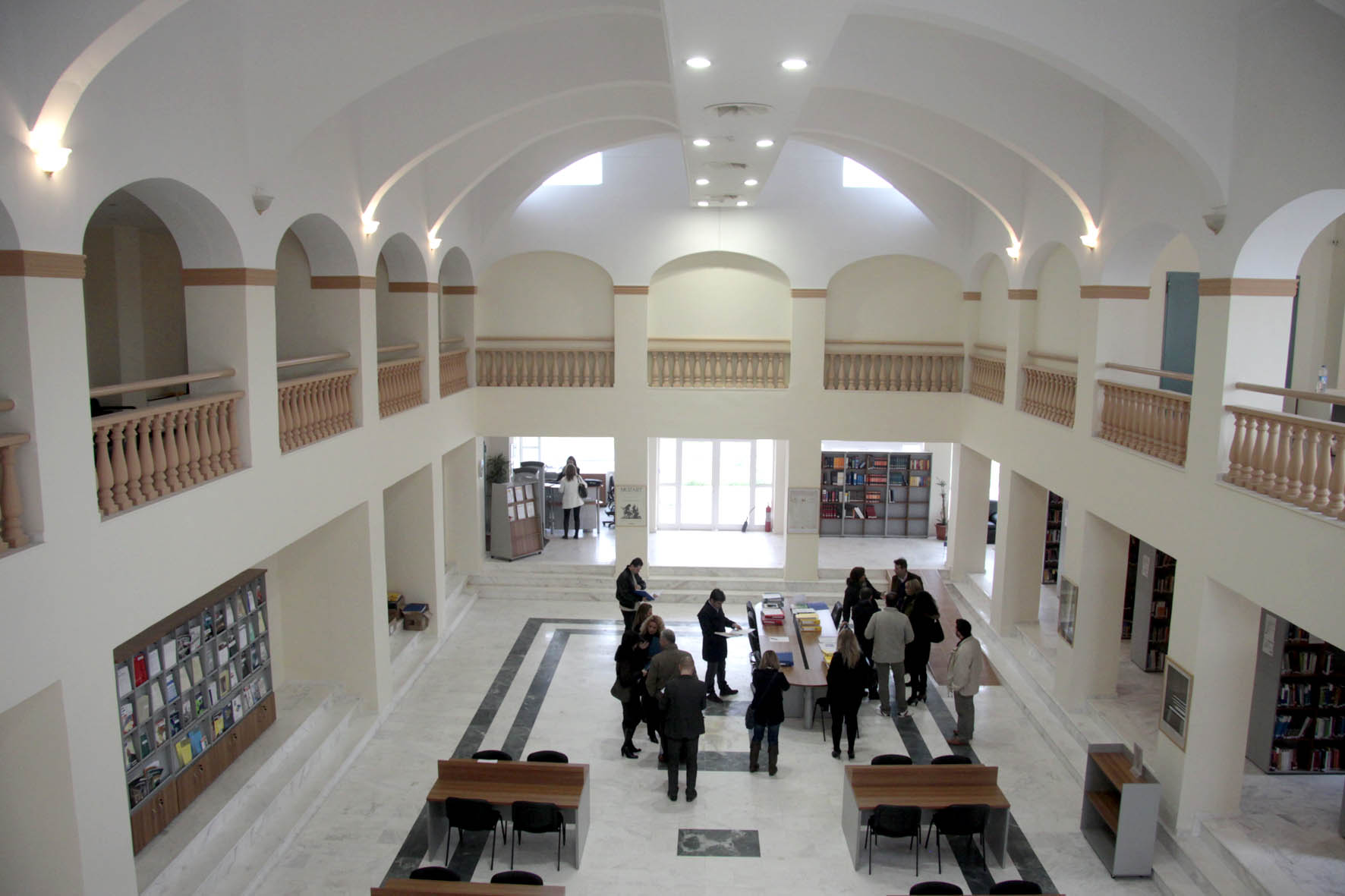
Library of the main campus

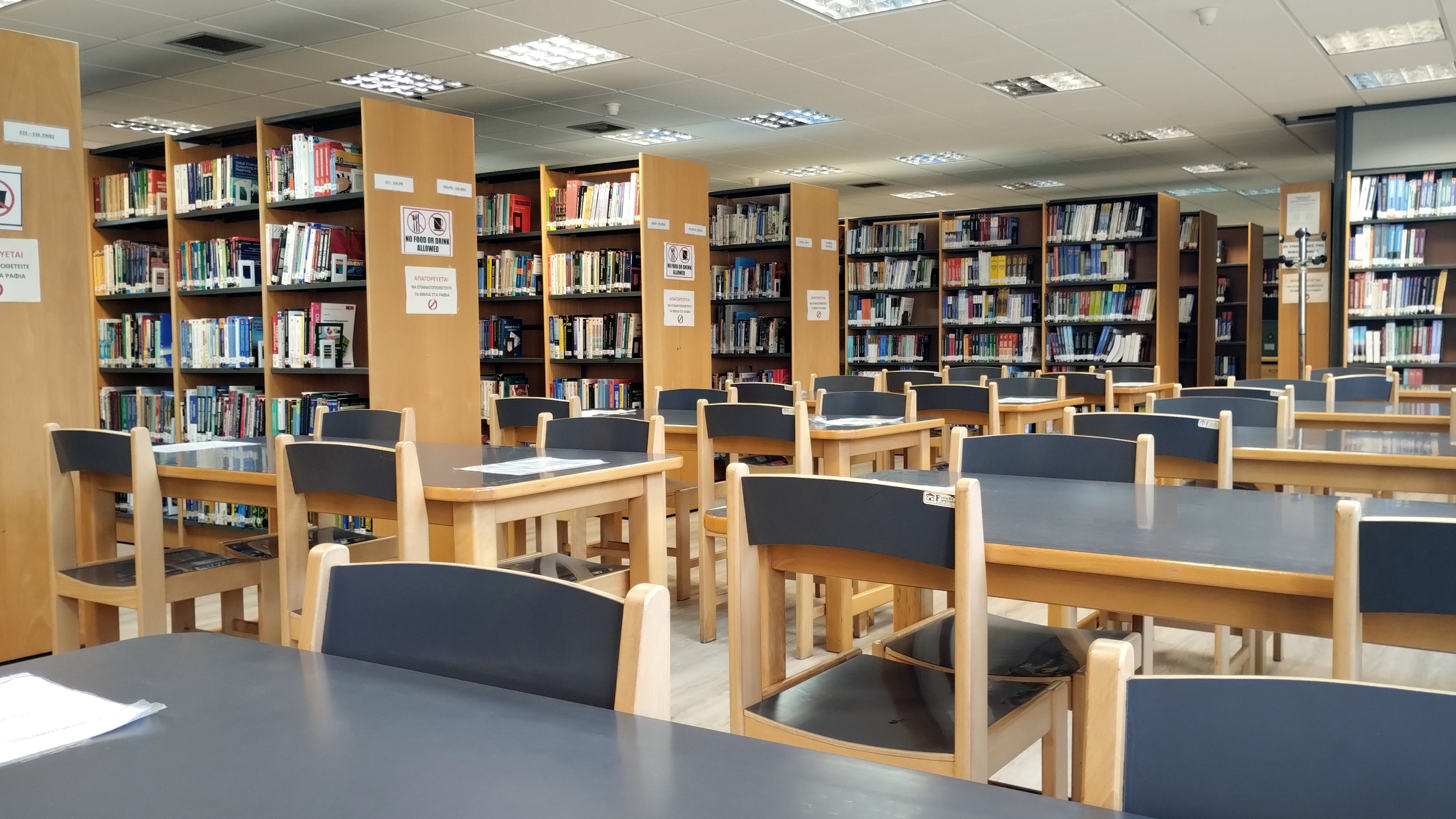
Library at the Alexander campus.

The university is composed of 6 schools:

Schools	Departments
School of Geosciences (est. in 2019, Thessaloniki)	Department of Agriculture (est. in 2019); Department of Food Science and Technology (est. in 2019)
School of Design Sciences (est. in 2019, Kilkis, Serres)	Department of Creative Design and Clothing (est. in 2019, Kilkis); Department of Interior Architecture (est. in 2019, Serres)
School of Health Sciences (est. in 2019, Thessaloniki)	Department of Biomedical Sciences (est. in 2019); Department of Nutritional Sciences and Dietetics (est. in 2019); Department of Midwifery Science (est. in 2019); Department of Nursing (est. in 2019); Department of Physiotherapy (est. in 2019)
School of Social Sciences (est. in 2019, Thessaloniki)	Department of Early Childhood Education and Care (est. in 2019); Department of Library, Archive and Information Science (est. in 2019)
School of Engineering (est. in 2019, Thessaloniki, Serres)	Department of Industrial Engineering and Management (est. in 2019, Thessaloniki); Department of Environmental Engineering (est. in 2019, Thessaloniki); Department of Information and Electronic Engineering (est. in 2019, Thessaloniki); Department of Computer, Informatics and Telecommunications Engineering (est. in 2019, Serres); Department of Surveying and Geoinformatics Engineering (est. in 2019, Serres); Department of Mechanical Engineering (est. in 2019, Serres); Department of Civil Engineering (est. in 2019, Serres)
School of Economics and Business Administration (est. in 2019, Katerini, Serres, Thessaloniki)	Department of Supply Chain Management (est. in 2019, Katerini); Department of Organization Management, Marketing and Tourism (est. in 2019, Thessaloniki); Department of Accounting and Information Systems (est. in 2019, Thessaloniki); Department of Economic Sciences (est. in 2019, Serres); Department of Business Administration (est. in 2019, Serres)

== Campuses ==
Since the 2019 merge with the TEIs in Northern Greece, the International Hellenic University has become one of the largest Greek universities. The total extension of its campuses is roughly 65.20 square kilometres (25.17 mi^{2}).

=== Thermi campus ===
The Thermi campus is the original International Hellenic University site, where the institution operated exclusively from 2005 until 2019. It is located in the outskirts of Thermi and is composed of two main buildings. After the 2019 merge, the campus was established as the administrative site for the entire university.

=== Alexander campus (former Alexander TEI of Thessaloniki) ===
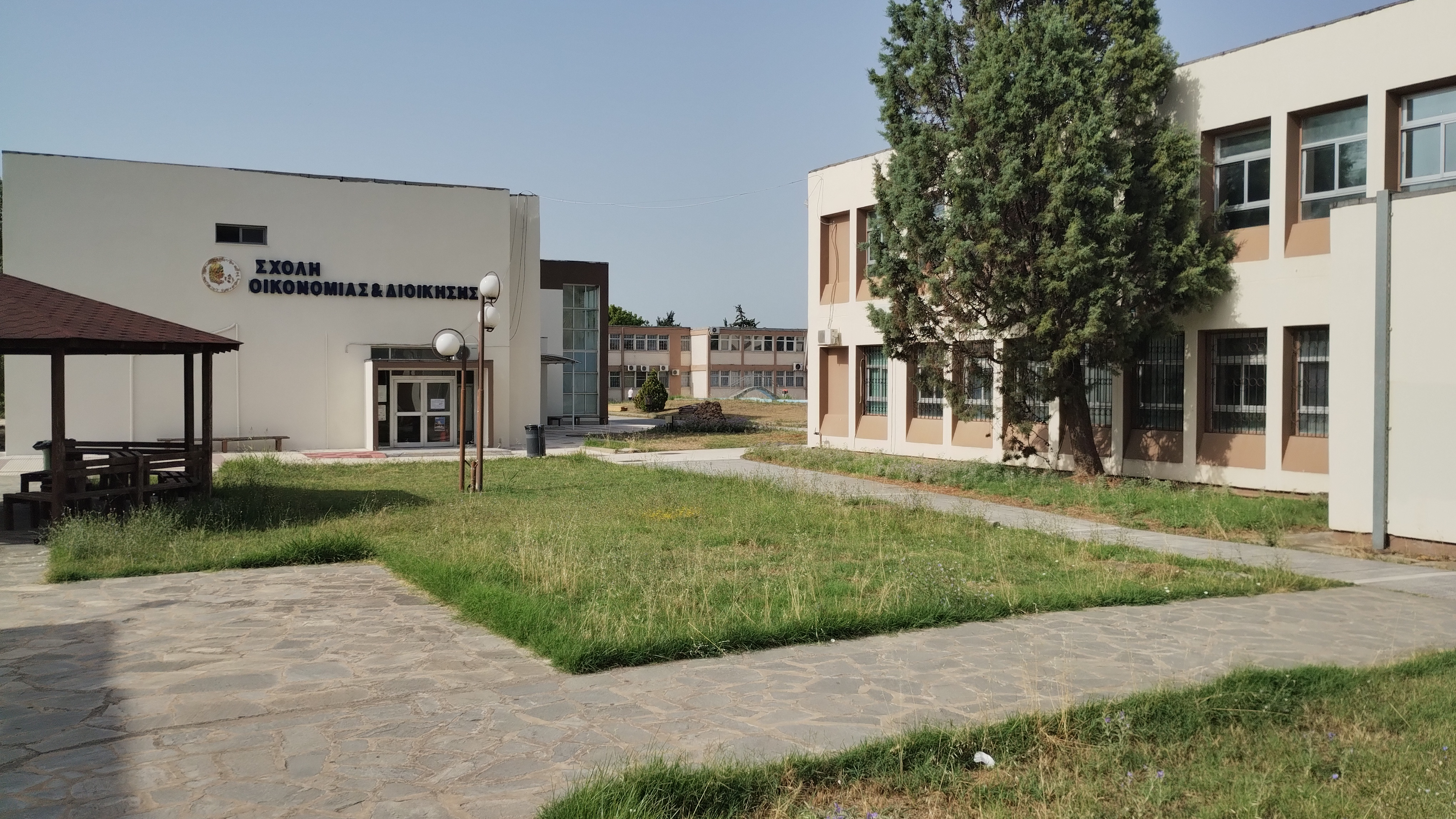
Alexander campus view from the staff cafeteria. On the foreground, the School of Economics and Business Administration building.

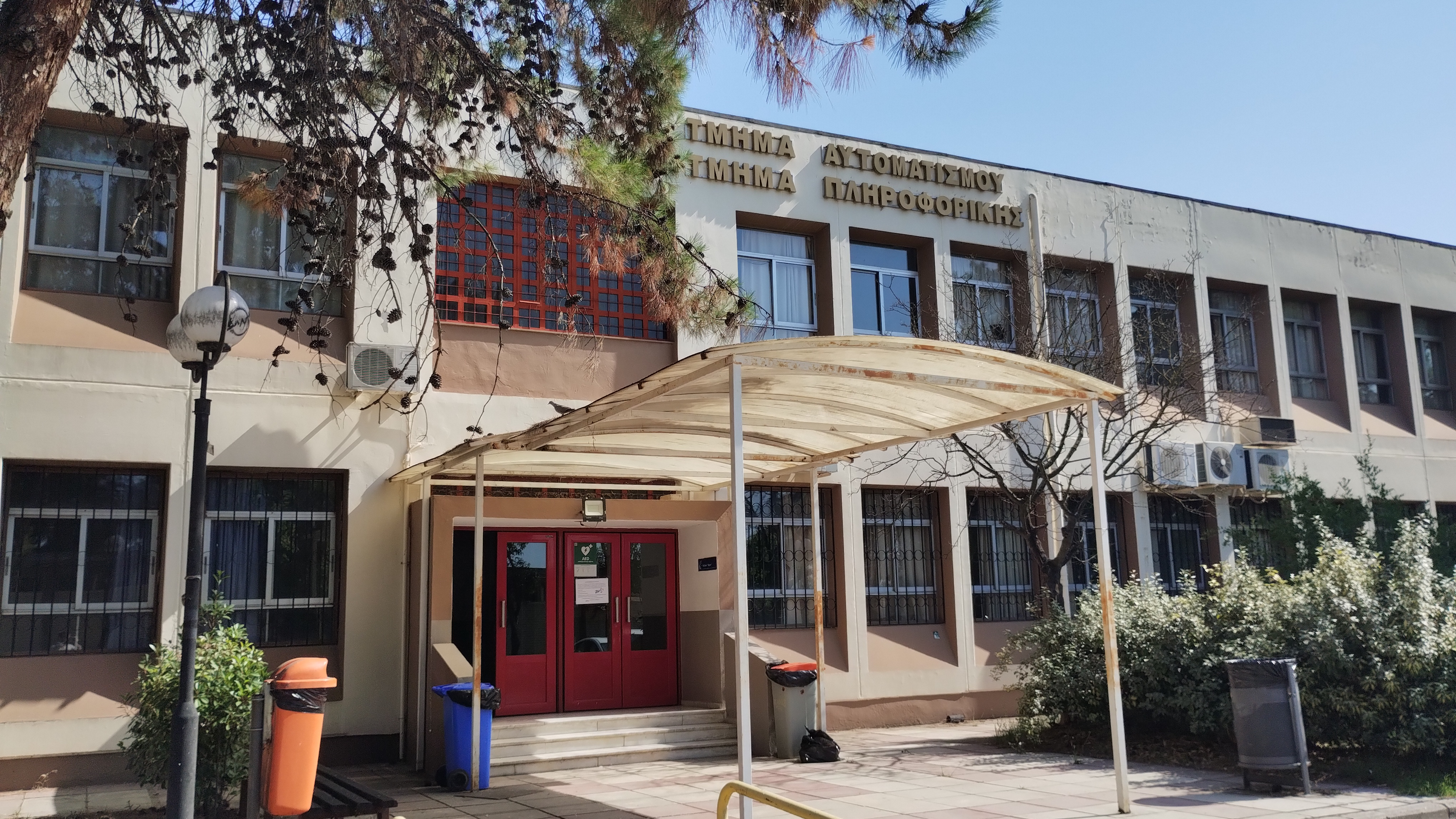
Informatics and Automation Departments building at the Alexander campus.

Located in the municipality of Sindos, 15 km west of Thessaloniki, the Alexander campus (Αλεξάνδρεια Πανεπιστημιούπολη) is built in an area of about 65 square kilometers, which makes it the biggest site among the university's ones. About 1000 acres are occupied by a farm.

The campus is equipped with two restaurants (one reserved to teaching and general staff and one for students), two basketball courts, a soccer field and an indoor gym.

=== Katerini campus (former TEI of Central Macedonia) ===
- Department of Supply Chain Management.

=== Kilkis campus (former TEI of Central Macedonia) ===
- Department of Creative Design and Clothing.

=== Serres campus (former TEI of Central Macedonia) ===
- Department of Computer, Informatics and Telecommunications Engineering.
- Department of Surveying and Geoinformatics Engineering.
- Department of Mechanical Engineering.
- Department of Interior Architecture.
- Department of Civil Engineering.

== Honorary doctorates ==
- Yiannis Boutaris.
- Margaritis Schinas.
- Kostas Grammenos.

== See also ==
- Open access in Greece
