= Alexander Technological Educational Institute of Thessaloniki =

Defunct tertiary education institute in Greece

Coordinates: 40.6572°N 22.8041°E

- Αλεξάνδρειο Τεχνολογικό Εκπαιδευτικό Ίδρυμα Θεσσαλονίκης
- Seal of the Alexander Technological Educational Institute of Thessaloniki (depicting Alexander the Great)
- Type: Public; Higher Education; Greece University System; University of Applied Sciences
- Established: 1970
- Parent institution: International Hellenic University (since 2019)
- President: Panagiotis Tzionas
- Academic staff: 430
- Administrative staff: 220
- Students: app. 30.000
- Location: Thessaloniki, Greece
- Website: www.teithe.gr

The Alexander Technological Educational Institute of Thessaloniki (Greek: Αλεξάνδρειο Τεχνολογικό Εκπαιδευτικό Ίδρυμα Θεσσαλονίκης), was a higher education public institute, part of the Greek tertiary education system, specialized on science. As of 2017, there was a student population of 30,000 registered students with more than 430 faculty members and 200 administrative staff. In 2019, the Alexander Technological Educational Institute of Thessaloniki merged with the Technological Educational Institute of Central Macedonia, the Technological Educational Institute of Eastern Macedonia and Thrace, and the International Hellenic University in order to form a new university, with the name of the latter.

== History ==
The Alexander Technological Educational Institute of Thessaloniki was founded in 1970 and started its operation in February 1974 as a Center for Higher Education. In 1983 Technological Educational Institutions were established as part of tertiary education in Greece.

The Department of Clothing Design and Production was added in the academic year 1999-2000 as an annex of the institute in Kilkis and in the academic year 2000-2001 the Department of Fisheries Technology - Aquaculture started operating, also as an annex of the A.T.E.I.TH., based in New Moudania Halkidiki. In addition, since the spring of 1998, two optional program studies have become available for admitting students outside the traditional way of examinations.

During 2019, the Alexander Technological Educational Institute of Thessaloniki was merged with the International University of Greece, and the Technological Educational Institutions of Central and Eastern Macedonia, Thrace to form the new International Hellenic University (www.ihu.gr).

== Schools and departments ==
The university includes four Schools, consisting of eighteen Departments.

Schools	Departments
School of Technological Applications	Department of Automation Engineering; Department of Information Technology; Department of Electronics Engineering; Department of Automotive Engineering; Department of Civil Infrastructure Engineering
School of Agricultural Technology, Food technology and Nutrition	Department of Food Technology; Department of Agricultural Technology; Department of Nutrition and Dietetics
School of Health and Medical Care	Department of Nursing; Department of Midwifery; Department of Physiotherapy; Department of Medical Laboratories Studies; Department of Early Childhood Care and Education; Department of Aesthetics and Cosmetology
School of Management and Economics	Department of Marketing; Department of Accounting; Department of Tourism Management; Department of Librarianship and Information Systems

== Campus ==
The institute has three campuses. The main campus is located 15 km outside the city of Thessaloniki in Sindos, the second campus is in the nearby city of Kilkis and the last campus is in Nea Moudania.

The institute's own facilities located at the 15th km of national road Thessaloniki - Athens, near the entrance of Sindos. Spread over an area of 1,600 acres, most of which approximately 900 acres, occupied the farm, with greenhouse crops, stables, poultry farm, plant personnel, training rooms and office service farm. The total building area reaches 35,000 m^{2}, which hosts the five schools currently operating in the institute. In the same area is, finally, one of the two homes available to the institute for the accommodation of students.

== Postgraduate education ==
The institution offers several postgraduate programmes:

M.Sc. in Tourism Management and Business Administration, M.B.A in Business Administration, M.Sc. in Money Management, Logistics and Informational Systems, M.Sc. in Web Intelligence, M.Sc. in Management and Organization of Educational Units, M.Sc. in Nutrition and Dietology, M.Sc. in Pediatrics Physiotherapy, M.Sc. in Innonative Systems of Sustainable Agricultural Production, M.Sc. in Quality Management and Organization of Production Systems in the Food Industry, M.Sc. in Neuromusculoskeletal Physiotherapy, M.Sc. in Bio-Medicinal Sciences in Diagnosis and Treatment of Patients.

== Academic evaluation ==
In 2016 the external evaluation committee gave the Alexander Technological Educational Institute of Thessaloniki a Positive evaluation.

All departments have published their internal evaluation reports.

== See also ==
- Open access in Greece
