= Computer science and engineering =

University academic program

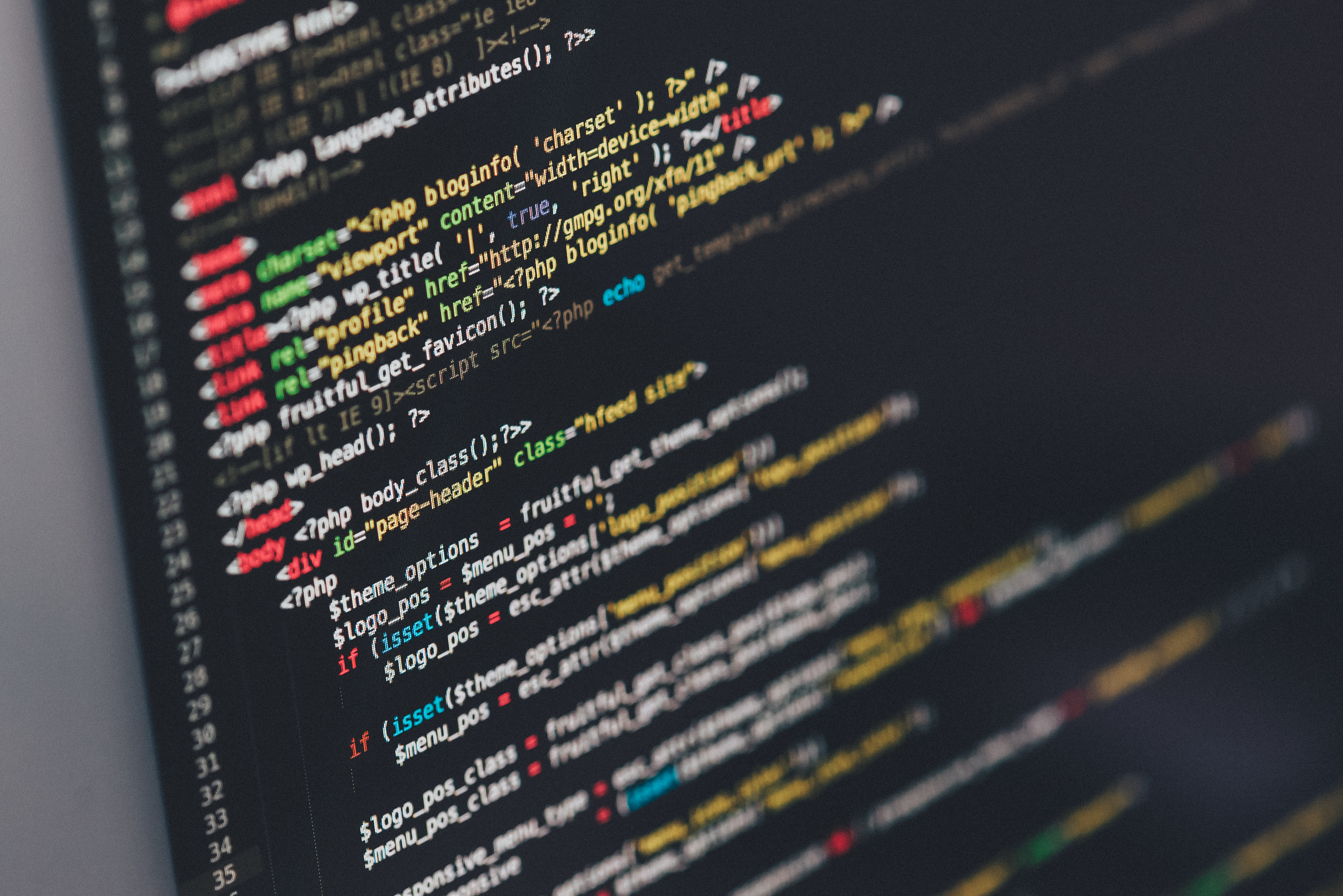
Computer programming, an essential component of CSE

Computer science and engineering (CSE) is an academic subject comprising approaches of computer science and computer engineering. There is no clear division in computing between science and engineering, just like in the field of materials science and engineering. However, some classes are historically more related to computer science (e.g. data structures and algorithms), and other to computer engineering (e.g. computer architecture). Some universities and institutions in India (like IITs) have academic departments named as Department of CSE. CSE is also a term often used in Europe to translate the name of technical or engineering informatics academic programs. It is offered in both undergraduate as well postgraduate with specializations.

So, CSE may refer to: academic subject, academic program, academic department.

== Academic courses ==
Academic programs vary between universities, but typically include a combination of topics in computer science, computer engineering and Electronics engineering. Undergraduate courses usually include subjects like programming, algorithms and data structures, computer architecture, operating systems, computer networks, embedded systems, Design and analysis of algorithms, circuit analysis and electronics, digital logic and design, software engineering, database systems and core subjects of theoretical computer science such as theory of computation, numerical methods, cloud computing, machine learning, programming theory and paradigms. Modern academic programs also cover emerging computing fields like Artificial intelligence, image processing, data science, robotics, bio-inspired computing, Internet of things, autonomic computing and Cyber security . Most CSE programs require introductory mathematical knowledge, hence the first year of study is dominated by mathematical courses, primarily discrete mathematics, mathematical analysis, linear algebra, probability and statistics, as well as the introduction to physics and electrical and electronic engineering.

== See also ==
- Computer science
- Computer engineering
- Computing
- Computer graphics (computer science)
- Bachelor of Technology
