= Technological Educational Institute of Eastern Macedonia and Thrace =

Former public institute

Coordinates: 40.929°N 24.379°E

- Τεχνολογικό Εκπαιδευτικό Ίδρυμα Ανατολικής Μακεδονίας και Θράκης
- Former names: Technological Educational Institute of Kavala (1983–2013)
- Type: Public; Higher Education; Greece University System; University of Applied Sciences
- Active: 2013–2019
- Endowment: €10,000,000/annum
- Chancellor: Dimitrios Bandekas
- Faculty: 104
- Administrative staff: 96
- Students: 13,500
- Location: Kavala (main campus), Didymoteicho, Drama, Greece
- Campus: Urban
- Website: www.teiemt.gr

The Technological Educational Institute of Eastern Macedonia and Thrace (TEIEMT; Greek: Τεχνολογικό Εκπαιδευτικό Ίδρυμα Ανατολικής Μακεδονίας και Θράκης, ΤΕΙΑΜΘ; formerly Technological Educational Institute of Kavala, TEIK; Τεχνολογικό Εκπαιδευτικό Ίδρυμα Καβάλας, TEIK) was a public higher institute providing university-level education in Eastern Macedonia and Thrace. The institute has three campuses; the main campus in St. Lukas, Kavala, and additional campuses in Drama and Didymoteicho. The TEI of Kavala had 13,500 registered students in the academic year 2007–08, ranking seventh among the 16 technological educational institutes in Greece in terms of students.

== History ==
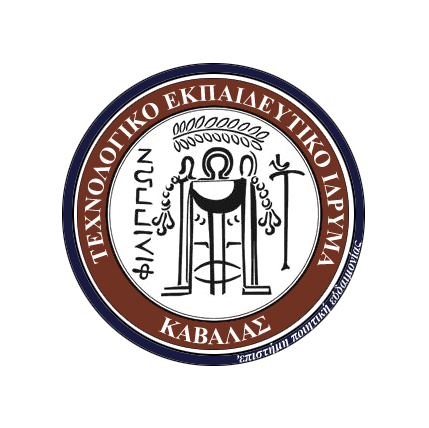
Technological Educational Institute of Kavala's official seal and emblem

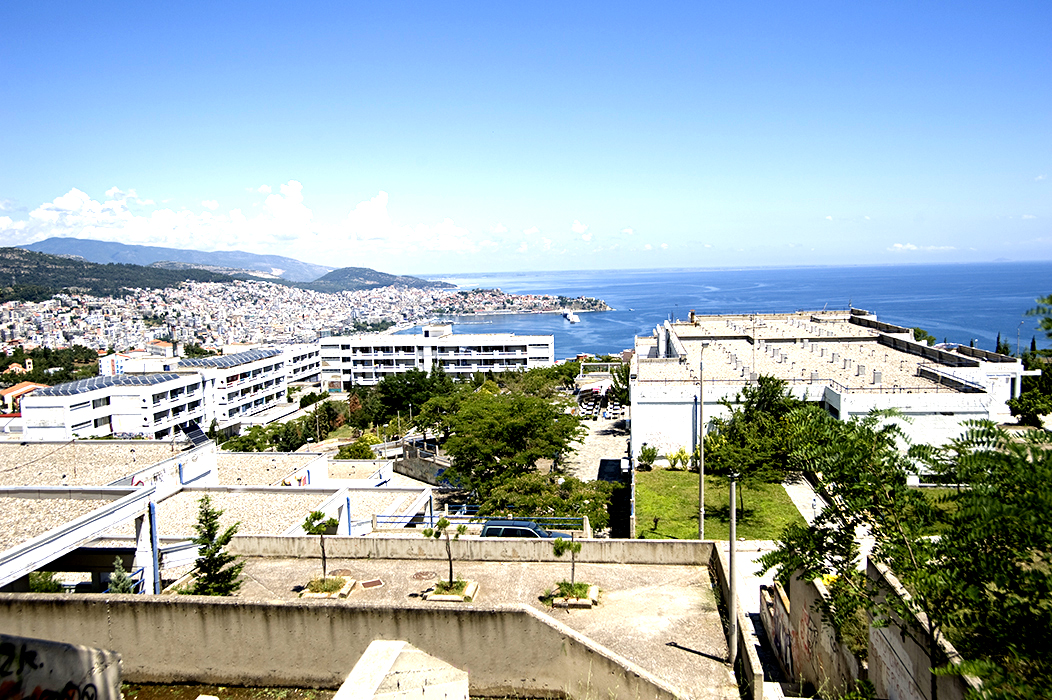
Panoramic view of the Technological Educational Institute of Kavala

The Technological Educational Institute of Eastern Macedonia and Thrace (TEIEMT) was founded in 2013 by the Presidential Decree 87/4-6-2013 (Government Gazette 129/A/5-6-2013). Originally established as Center for Higher Technical Education (ΚΑΤΕ) of Kavala in 1976 by Presidential Decree 748/13-10-1976 (Government Gazette 272/A/14-10-1976) and by the Legislative Decree 652/29-8-1970 (Government Gazette 180/A/29-8-1970), after re-established as Center for Higher Technical-Vocational Education (KATEE) of Kavala (1977–1983) by the Law 576/7-4-1977 (Government Gazette 102/A/13-4-1977), after re-established as Technological Educational Institute of Kavala (TEIK) by the Law 1404/22-11-1983 (Government Gazette 173/Α/24-11-1983). In 2001 it was upgraded to a higher educational institute by the Law 2916/1-6-2001 (Government Gazette 114/Α/11-6-2001), and its current form is a result of many institutional reforms and changes.

In 2019, the Technological Educational Institute of Central Macedonia, the Technological Educational Institute of Eastern Macedonia and Thrace, and the Alexander Technological Educational Institute of Thessaloniki merged into International Hellenic University.

=== Departments ===
In its earlier (1976–1983) forms, the TEI of Kavala consisted of six departments: Electrical Engineering, Mechanical Engineering, Petroleum Engineering, Sciences, Accounting, and the Foreign Languages and Physical Education Centre. In 1983, the first four were allocated to the newly formed School of Engineering Sciences and the remaining two to the School of Business and Economics. In 1985 the first campus outside of Kavala was established in the nearby city of Drama; the Department of Forestry and Natural Environment Management was the first department that established there. In 1986, the Department of Business Administration was founded and integrated into the School of Business and Economics.

During the period 1999–2007, the institute underwent an expansion, with the creation of four more departments, originally financed by the European Union through the Operational Programme for Education and Initial Vocational Training. The new departments are Industrial Informatics (1999) and Information Management (2000), located in Kavala; Landscape Architecture (2003), located in Drama; and Nursing (2007), located in Didymoteicho, in the eastern part of Evros regional unit of Thrace.

Following the establishment of the Department of Landscape Architecture, a third school, the School of Agricultural Technology, was established in the Institute. In 2009, the Department of Oenology was founded and integrated into the Drama Branch.

== Facilities ==
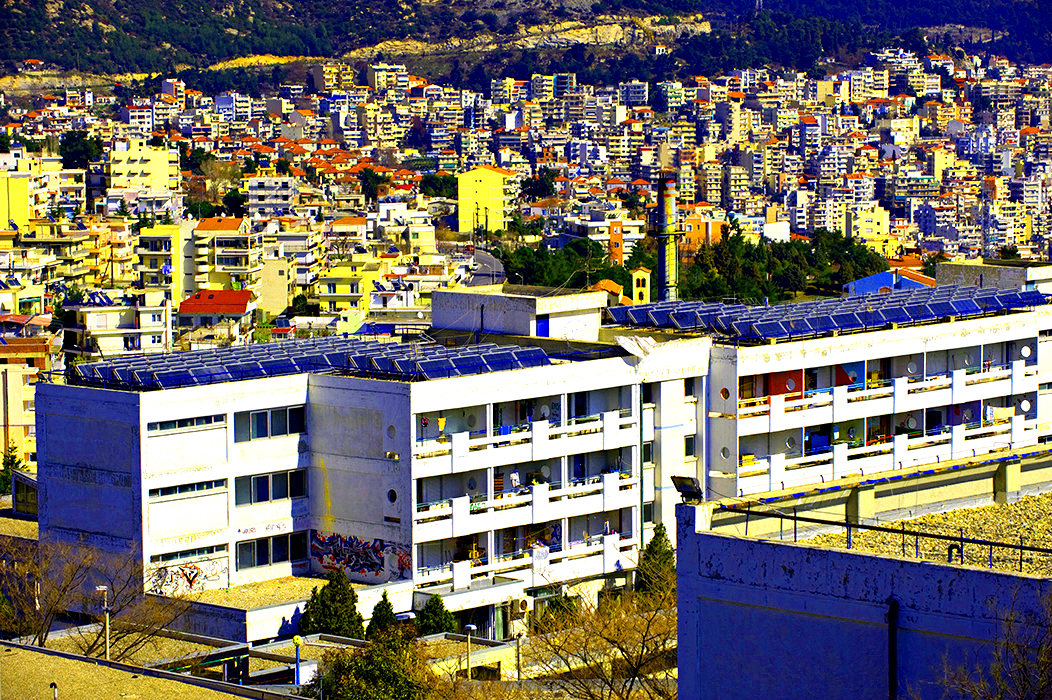
The Halls of Residence of the IHU (former TEI of Eastern Macedonia and Thrace)

Part of student residences and faculties of the IHU (former TEI of Eastern Macedonia and Thrace)

TEI of Kavala's facilities were originally located in leased buildings around Kavala. In 1992 these facilities relocated to the new main campus in St. Lukas. Developed by Michaniki S.A., the campus buildings were arranged in an amphitheatre-style structure, overlooking the gulf of Kavala. The campus area is approximately 132,000 square metres (1,420,000 sq ft) with buildings covering 36,000 square metres (390,000 sq ft).

The Drama Campus is located in Microchori, Drama. The Departments of Forestry and Oenology and administration services, the Museum of Natural History, and the Botanical Gardens are located within the campus area of 100,000 square metres (1,100,000 sq ft) with buildings covering 6,000 square metres (65,000 sq ft). The Department of Landscape Architecture is located in the city of Drama, in facilities granted by the regional unit of Drama. The Didymoteicho Campus is accommodated in the historic Primary School in the centre of Didymoteicho.

The main library, in operation since 1988, has a collection of over 32,000 volumes. It subscribes to 17 electronic sources (on-line databases, digital libraries, statistical databases) and provides access to 550 scientific journals. The study room area is 800 square metres (8,600 sq ft), has seating capacity for 200 people, and provides access to 22 computers. In comparison with other TEIs, the library in Kavala is ranked sixth in number of books. Libraries are also located at the Drama and Didymoteicho campuses.

== Academic evaluation ==
An external evaluation of all academic departments in Greek universities will be conducted by the Hellenic Quality Assurance and Accreditation Agency (HQAA) in the following years.

- Department of Information Management (2010)
- Department of Business Administration (2011)
- Department of Accounting (2011)
- Department of Oil and Natural Gas Technologies (2011)
- Department of Electrical Engineering (2012)
- Department of Forestry and Natural Environment Management (2010)
- Department of Landscape Architecture (2011)

== Academic structure and administration ==
The institute comprises three schools and thirteen departments. The following provides an overview of this structure and the number of students entering the institute per annum.

Kavala Campus (Main):

School of Engineering Sciences
Department of Petroleum Technology and Natural Gas (305)
Department of Electrical Engineering (300)
Department of Mechanical Engineering (300)
Department of Informatics Engineering (300)
Department of Sciences (–)

School of Business and Economics
Department of Accounting (500)
Department of Business Administration (330)
Department of Information Management (300)
Department of Foreign Languages and Physical Education Centre (–)

Drama Campus:

School of Agricultural Technology
Department of Forestry & Natural Environment Management (150)
Department of Landscape Architecture (150)
Department of Oenology and Beverage Technology (independent) (100)

Didymoteicho Campus:

Department of Nursing (150)

=== Postgraduate studies ===
The following Master's degree-level programmes are available:

1. Master of Science (MSc) in Oil and Gas Technology.
2. Master in Business Administration (MBA).
3. Master of Science (MSc) in Management of Water Resources in the Mediterranean.
4. Master of Science (MSc) in Management Science and Information Systems.
5. Master of Science (MSc) in Accounting, Audit and International Transactions.
6. Master of Science (MSc) in Innovation in Technology & Entrepreneurship.
7. Master of Education (MEd) in Distance Education.
8. Master of Philosophy (MPhil) in Nanotechnology.
9. Master in Planning and Urban Green Management. That is a Join-Master's degree-level programme between Department of Forestry & Natural Environment Management and School of Forestry and Natural Environment of the Aristotle University of Thessaloniki (AUTh).

=== Administration ===
The institute is governed by the senate, the academic council, the president, and three vice-presidents. The academic council is composed of the president, three vice-presidents, three deans, the general secretary, and the student representative. Each vice-president deals with one of the following areas: academic affairs, economic affairs, and European and international affairs. Each school is governed by a dean that answers to a school board. The department heads and the student representatives participate in the school board. Each department is governed by a general assembly, a board, a general assembly, a head, and the managers of the sectors. Each department acts independently and has two or more sectors to which the members of educational staff of the department are allocated. Each department board consists of a head, sectors managers, and a student representative.

=== Academic staff ===
Educational duties in TEI of Kavala are carried out by the members of the permanent academic staff, consisting of professors, associate professors, assistant professors, and lecturers. The members of academic staff cooperate with temporary staff such as scientific and laboratory associates, laboratory technicians, and administrative staff.

=== Ranking ===
Technological Educational Institute of Kavala (TEIK) is ranked first among the 16 Technological Educational Institutes and 16th among 40 universities and institutes throughout Greece. Globally, it is ranked in the first third (2,076th) of the world's top 12,000 universities as determined according to the indexes of the Cybermetrics Lab, which are based on the production and publication of scientific knowledge.

== Research and innovation ==
The TEI of Kavala is actively involved in a variety of research areas, including computer science chemistry, chemical engineering, and material science. TEI of Kavala publishes two English-language scientific journals. The Journal of Engineering Science and Technology Review is edited by Prof. D. Bantekas. The journal's board includes Prof. D. Nanopoulos and Prof. E. Gazis. The journal is registered in research databases such as EBSCO Publishing and the Directory of Open Access Journals, and is included in CERN's recognised scientific journals. The International Journal of Economics Science and Applied Research is edited by Prof. Α. Κarasavvoglou from the Department of Accounting. Both journals are published in electronic and printed form and access to the journals is free.

TEI of Kavala has made significant investments in research infrastructure, including laboratory equipment for the promotion of knowledge in specific fields. Among those, the small-angle X-ray scattering and the scanning electron microscope in the Centre for In-Situ Studies permits the in-situ combination of different experimental methods for the static and dynamic (in process) study of nanomaterials. Others laboratories include the Water Quality Laboratory, the Petroleum Chemistry Laboratory, the Materials Laboratory, the Photovoltaic Laboratory, and the Microcomputers Laboratory.

In 2004, the academic staff founded the Technology Research Centre of East Macedonia and Thrace (Presidential Decree 36/ΦΕΚ 30/06-02-04). This is a legal entity of private law focused on innovation in the areas of radiation, fuels, marbles, new products design, marketing, informatics, and environment. The centre has overseen the development of innovative technologies, including the survivor-detection robotic vehicle R.OX.AN.E, for which the centre was awarded a prize at the Athens Digital Week 2009 exhibition. The centre has organised an Innovation Festival since 2010. The centre is a regular participant in exhibitions in Thessaloniki and Thrace; at a recent exhibition in Thrace, the Prime Minister of Greece, George Papandreou, inspected recent technological advances made at the TEI of Kavala.

KavTech has been actively involved in many international cooperative programmes over the past ten years, such as ERASMUS, COMETT, LINGUA, PETRA, TEMPUS, EUROFORM, TEXT, EURASHE, SOCRATES, and bilateral international cooperation programs with Slovenia and Georgia. It has been also actively involved in international research projects such as Alpha, EU DG-Research Vth Framework, (Medmont /QLK5-2000-01031), (Controcam /QLK5-2000-01684), Interreg IIIB CADSES, (Governet/3B084), Interreg III A Phare CBC Greece-Bulgaria (Dra-Smo 2.1–67), Interreg III B Archimed (Acronym Managmed A.1 113.31), Greece-Jordan Hellenic Aid (YDAS 44.8), and Interreg IV-C South East.

== Student life ==
TEI of Kavala offers an active student life; students can participate in the institute's theatre group, music groups, and painting and hagiography ateliers. Available sports include football, basketball, and volleyball teams that participate with distinction in the Universiade. There is great interest in the martial-arts team, the aerobics team, and the traditional dances group in which the Pontian and Cretan Student Associations are active. Other active cultural associations are the Cypriot and Thessalian Student Associations as well as the Graduates of the Department of Forestry. The Pontian Student Association is the oldest in the Institute (1984), and has constructed a monument in memory of the genocide of Pontian Greeks that was inaugurated by the then-President of the Republic, Konstantinos Stefanopoulos. The association has represented the AEIs of Greece in the cultural festival of Santa Napa (1993).

=== Student exchange programs ===
TEI of Kavala is a member of a number of networks to enhance internationalisation. For instance, TEI of Kavala is highly active in Socrates, Erasmus Mundus, Leonardo da Vinci, Associations des Formations Européennes à la Comptabilité et l'Audit, Euroweek-Primenetworking, European Taxation and Accounting in Practice, International Student Olympias of Business Administration, and others. Student groups from TEI of Kavala regularly participate with distinction in Euroweek.

=== English for Specific Professional Purposes Certificate (E.S.P.P.C.) ===
The Technological Educational Institute of Kavala offers a chance to its students/graduates to certify their knowledge in English in their fields of study. To this end, the Centre of Foreign Languages & Physical Education of the TEI of Kavala has carried out an examination system, namely E.S.P.P.C., since 2009. The level of the test according to the Council of Europe's Vantage Level is (B2 +) for general language proficiency. E.S.P.P.C. is protected by copyright and its purpose is to test candidates’ ability to understand and produce written language in English in their own scientific domain.

Specifically the test examines:

- Technical and academic writing
- Reading comprehension
- Language awareness

Certificates for passing candidates are issued both by the Centre of Foreign Languages & Physical Education and the Administration of the Technological Educational Institute of Kavala (TEIK) with the general characterization "PASS".

=== Events ===
Many distinguished scientists and personalities have delivered lectures in TEI of Kavala. TEI of Kavala welcomed Professor Dimitris Nanopoulos to talk about the Large Hadron Collider in May 2009. Patriarch Theophilos III of Jerusalem presented "The Jerusalem Patriarchate and the meaning of Sacred Pilgrimages" in July 2009. Painter G. Kordis presented The art of image as a visual creation in November 2009. The Rector of Sorbonne, Eleni Glykatzi-Ahrweiler, presented "The Pontian Greeks and their intellectual life" in January 2010, and journalist S. Fyntanidis talked about Journalism and personality protection in March 2010. TEI of Kavala organises a variety of events, including international conferences.

== Seals and emblems ==
The TEI of Kavala's official seal is the Tripod of Philippi with lion's feet and three handles, two of which are side-handles decorated with strands by three beams. Above the tripod there is a laurel branch, and on the right side there is a long-handled axe. This tripod was originally used on the tetradrachma coin, dating from the period 356-345 B.C. The other side of the coin, that was the official seal and emblem of the Technological Educational Institute of Eastern Macedonia and Thrace (TEIEMT), depicts the head of the young Hercules wearing a lion's skin. When Philip II of Macedon conquered the Mount Pangaio goldmine in 358 B.C., he renamed the ancient Crenides to Philippi, and minted the race (drachma), the dolphin (half-drachma), the bow (silver stater), and the Phrygian cap (gold stater) coins, on which the tripod emblem was depicted.
