= Foglio =

Foglio is an Italian surname. Notable people with the surname include:

- Kaja Foglio (born 1970), American artist and writer
- Paolo Foglio (born 1975), Italian footballer
- Phil Foglio (born 1956), American cartoonist and comic book artist
- Valerio Foglio (born 1985), Italian footballer
