= Informatics for Consumer Health =

U.S. government initiative

Informatics for Consumer Health (ICH) is a government initiative coordinated by the National Cancer Institute (NCI) within the National Institutes of Health (NIH). ICH focuses on a coordination of health information, technology, and health care delivery that empowers providers to manage care and increases the ability of consumers to gain mastery over their own health. The ICH online initiative involved stakeholders from various sectors—commercial IT, government, health care, education, research, and advocacy—exchanging ideas and resources to bridge information technology and health care with the goal of improving behavioral support for all consumers. The Informatics for Consumer Health field is related to health informatics, medical informatics, consumer health informatics, eHealth, and health information technology.

== Background ==
Changing health behaviors is key to improving health outcomes. Research indicates that changes in basic preventive behavior - smoking cessation, better diet and exercise, and routine screenings—can lead to potential reductions in disability and death due to cancer, heart disease, and diabetes. Effective consumer health information technology (health IT) applications hold great promise for encouraging and supporting behavior change.

With the behavioral and population health evidence-base as a backdrop, the "Informatics for Consumer Health" came out of to two events that occurred in 2009. The first event occurred in early 2009, when the U.S.-based National Research Council released a report titled "Computational Technology for Effective Healthcare: Immediate Steps and Future Directions". This report concluded that many of the current deployments of health information technology had become disconnected from their primary objectives: to ensure the health of real consumers in real world settings. The research portfolio in health systems should be rebalanced, authors of the report argued, to emphasize cognitive support for providers, patients, and their families over technology development for its own sake.

The second event occurred in March 2009, when the U.S. Congress passed the American Recovery and Reinvestment Act (ARRA) of 2009. Title XIII of the Act, also referred to as the Health Information Technology for Economic and Clinical Health (HITECH) Act, gave authority to the Department of Health and Human Services to offer incentives. "Meaningful use", rather than "use" measured in technological terms, was to be gauged in terms of outcomes for patients and their families.

In this context, a number of Federal agencies came together to convene the "Informatics for Consumer Health: Summit on Communication, Collaboration, and Quality," in November 2009. The summit brought together nearly 200 leaders from commercial IT, government, health care, education, research, and advocacy organizations to open a dialogue and begin creating a blueprint for improving health care quality through enhanced behavioral support for consumers across the healthcare spectrum. Key Summit objectives to foster collaborations and spur innovation led to the publication of a special supplement on cyberinfrastructure for consumer health in the American Journal of Preventive Medicine and the development of the online Informatics for Consumer Health (ICH) platform in 2010.

For three years the platform, informaticsforconsumehealth.org, served as a rallying place for summit stakeholders representing a wide range of sectors to exchange resources that bridge information technology and health care, and improve behavioral support for all consumers. By sharing news, resources, and funding opportunities the ICH community helped disseminate information for facilitating collaboration among the public, private, and research communities to improve consumer health.

Goals of the ICH platform included:

1. Serving as a clearinghouse of knowledge for use in the development of high-quality evidence based consumer and clinical health IT products.
2. Creating an interactive portal where stakeholders could communicate and stay up to date on health IT research innovations and opportunities for collaboration and partnership.
3. Learning from key stakeholders about available resources, projects, opportunities, and partnerships in consumer and clinical health IT to disseminate on the ICH platform.
4. Providing a platform for conversation and collaboration around informatics for consumer health.

In 2013, the ICH platform was retired and all original content is now archived on the National Cancer Institute's Health Communication and Informatics Research Branch (HCIRB) website. As the science and practice of behavioral and public health informatics evolve, the activities and initiatives frequently aggregated and posted on the ICH platform continue to be a priority for the public and private sector.

== Partners ==
The Informatics for Consumer Health initiative is led by a collaboration of Federal agencies with active intramural and extramural programs focused on aspects of consumer health IT.

- Agency for Healthcare Research and Quality (AHRQ)
- Centers for Disease Control and Prevention (CDC)
- National Cancer Institute (NCI)
- National Institute of Standards and Technology (NIST)
- National Library of Medicine (NLM)
- National Science Foundation (NSF)
- Office of the National Coordinator for Health Information Technology (ONC)
