= Tutti Frutti =

Tutti frutti is confectionery containing candied fruits.

Tutti frutti may also refer to:

== Music ==
- "Tutti Frutti", 1938 novelty jazz song by Slim & Slam
- "Tutti Frutti" (song), 1955 song by Little Richard
- "Tutti Frutti" (New Order song), 2015 song by New Order
- Tutti Frutti (Brazilian band), Brazilian rock band
- Tutti Frutti (Croatian band), Yugoslavian rock band

== Theatre, film and television ==
- Tutti Frutti (1987 TV series), British television series
- Tutti Frutti (game show), German game show
- Mrs. Tutti Frutti, 1921 film directed by Michael Curtiz

== Other uses ==
- Tutti Frutti Frozen Yogurt, a California-based frozen yogurt outlet
- Tutti frutti; aus den Papieren des Verstorbenen, work by Hermann, Fürst von Pückler-Muskau
