= Tombola =

Tombola or variants may refer to:

- Tombola (game), a lottery-type game originating in Italy
- Tombola (bingo company), a UK-based online gaming company
- Tómbola (film), 1962 Spanish musical film with child singer and actress Marisol
- Tómbola (TV series), an American Spanish-language entertainment-news TV show
- Operation Tombola, a Second World War Allied operation in Italy
- Moussier Tombola, a French comedian

== See also ==
- Tombolo, an attached island formed by erosion and wave action
- Tombolo, Veneto, a municipality in the Italian region Veneto
- Bingo (United Kingdom) a game of chance originating in Italy
