= Technological Educational Institute of Central Macedonia =

Defunct tertiary education institute in Greece

Coordinates: 41.0750°N 23.5540°E

- Τεχνολογικό Εκπαιδευτικό Ίδρυμα Κεντρικής Μακεδονίας
- Former names: Technological Educational Institute of Serres (1983–2013)
- Type: Public; Higher Education; Greece University System; University of Applied Sciences
- Active: 2013–2019
- Rector: Dimitris Chasapis
- Academic staff: 400
- Students: 14,000
- Location: Serres (main campus); Katerini; Kilkis
- Website: www.teicm.gr

The Technological Educational Institute of Central Macedonia (TEICM; Greek: Τεχνολογικό Εκπαιδευτικό Ίδρυμα Κεντρικής Μακεδονίας, TEIKM) was a higher-educational institute supervised by the Ministry of Education, Lifelong Learning and Religious Affairs.

It was founded in 1983 as Technological Educational Institute of Serres (TEISER; Τεχνολογικό Εκπαιδευτικό Ίδρυμα Σερρών, ΤΕΙΣΕΡ) and is located in the city of Serres with campuses operate also in Katerini and Kilkis. The Technological Educational Institute of Serres (TEISER) was renamed Technological Educational Institute of Central Macedonia (TEICM; Τεχνολογικό Εκπαιδευτικό Ίδρυμα Κεντρικής Μακεδονίας, TEIKM) in 2013. It was consisted the School of Technological Applications, the School of Administration and Economics, and the independent Department of Graphic Arts and Design. The School of Graphic Arts and Design of the Technological Educational Institute of Serres was abolished in 2013, and then the Department of Graphic Arts and Design (2009-2018) became independent and since 2018-2019 academic year was incorporated into the School of Technological Applications. In 2019, the TEI of Central Macedonia, the TEI of Eastern Macedonia and Thrace, and the Alexander Technological Educational Institute of Thessaloniki merged into International Hellenic University.

== Schools and departments ==
The ATHENA Reform Plan restructured the institute's departments in 2013.

The university comprises three Schools and seven Departments, to be reduced tο six by 2018.

| Schools | Departments |
|---|---|
| School of Technological Applications | Department of Informatics Engineering; Department of Mechanical Engineering; Department of Civil Engineering and Surveying Engineering and Geoinformatics; Department of Clothing Design and Technology (Kilkis campus) |
| School of Administration and Economics | Department of Business Administration; Department of Accounting and Finance; Department of Supply Chain Management (Katerini campus) |
| School of Graphic Arts and Design | Department of Interior Architecture, Decoration and Design |

== Academic evaluation ==
In 2015 the external evaluation committee gave TEI of Central Macedonia a Positive evaluation.

An external evaluation of all academic departments in Greek universities was conducted by the Hellenic Quality Assurance and Accreditation Agency (HQA).

== See also ==
- List of universities in Greece
- List of research institutes in Greece
- ΤΕΙ of Eastern Macedonia and Thrace
- Education in Greece
- Academic grading in Greece
