= Information engineering =

Engineering discipline

Information engineering is the engineering discipline that deals with the generation, distribution, analysis, and use of information, data, and knowledge in electrical systems. The field first became identifiable in the early 21st century.

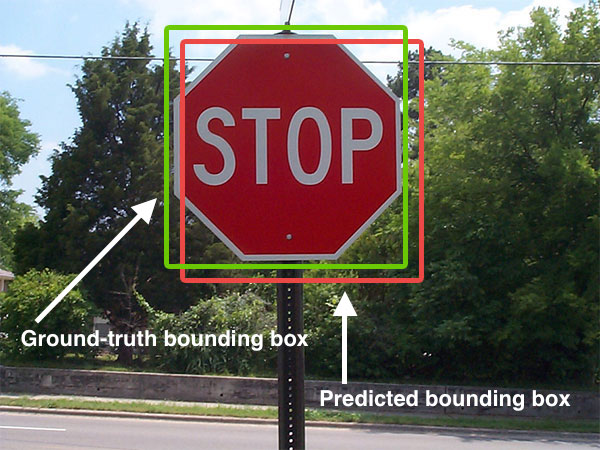
Object detection for a stop sign

The components of information engineering include more theoretical fields such as electromagnetism, machine learning, artificial intelligence, control theory, signal processing, and microelectronics, and more applied fields such as computer vision, natural language processing, bioinformatics, medical image computing, cheminformatics, autonomous robotics, mobile robotics, and telecommunications. Many of these originate from computer engineering, as well as other branches of engineering such as electrical engineering, computer science and bioengineering.

An example of clustering in machine learning

The field of information engineering is based heavily on engineering and mathematics, particularly probability, statistics, calculus, linear algebra, optimization, differential equations, variational calculus, and complex analysis.

Information engineers often hold a degree in information engineering or a related area, and are often part of a professional body such as the Institution of Engineering and Technology or Institute of Measurement and Control. They are employed in almost all industries due to the widespread use of information engineering.

== History ==
In the 1980s and 1990s, the term information engineering referred to an area of software engineering which came to be known as data engineering in the 2010s and 2020s.

== Elements ==
=== Machine learning and statistics ===
Machine learning is the field that involves the use of statistical and probabilistic methods to let computers "learn" from data without being explicitly programmed. Data science involves the application of machine learning to extract knowledge from data.

Subfields of machine learning include deep learning, supervised learning, unsupervised learning, reinforcement learning, semi-supervised learning, and active learning.

Causal inference is another related component of information engineering.

=== Control theory ===
Control theory refers to the control of (continuous) dynamical systems, with the aim being to avoid delays, overshoots, or instability. Information engineers tend to focus more on control theory rather than the physical design of control systems and circuits (which tends to fall under electrical engineering).

Subfields of control theory include classical control, optimal control, and nonlinear control.

=== Signal processing ===
Signal processing refers to the generation, analysis and use of signals, which could take many forms such as image, sound, electrical, or biological.

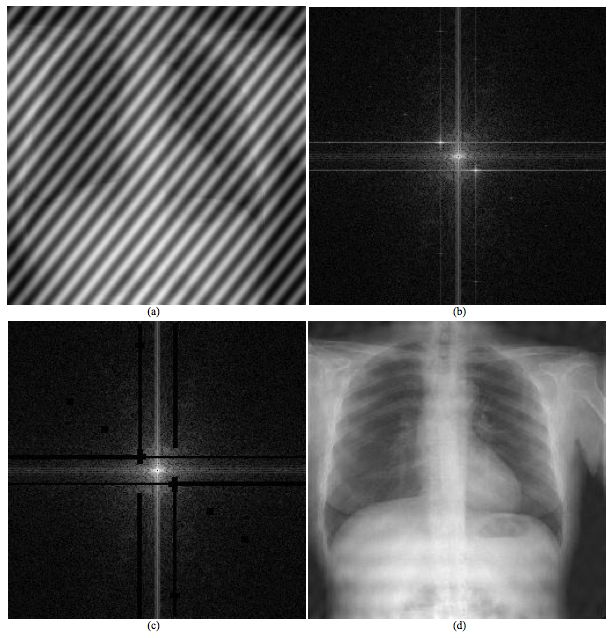
An example of how the 2D Fourier transform can be used to remove unwanted information from an X-ray scan

=== Information theory ===
Information theory studies the analysis, transmission, and storage of information. Major subfields of information theory include coding and data compression.

=== Computer vision ===
Computer vision is the field that deals with getting computers to understand image and video data at a high level.

=== Natural language processing ===
Natural language processing deals with getting computers to understand human (natural) languages at a high level. This usually means text, but also often includes speech processing and recognition.

=== Bioinformatics ===
Bioinformatics is the field that deals with the analysis, processing, and use of biological data. This usually means topics such as genomics and proteomics, and sometimes also includes medical image computing.

=== Cheminformatics ===
Cheminformatics is the field that deals with the analysis, processing, and use of chemical data.

=== Robotics ===
Robotics in information engineering focuses mainly on the algorithms and computer programs used to control robots. As such, information engineering tends to focus more on autonomous, mobile, or probabilistic robots. Major subfields studied by information engineers include control, perception, SLAM, and motion planning.

== Tools ==
In the past some areas in information engineering such as signal processing used analog electronics, but nowadays most information engineering is done with digital computers. Many tasks in information engineering can be parallelized, and so nowadays information engineering is carried out using CPUs, GPUs, and AI accelerators. There has also been interest in using quantum computers for some subfields of information engineering such as machine learning and robotics.

== See also ==
- Aerospace engineering – Branch of engineering
- Chemical engineering – Engineering discipline focused on the design and operation of chemical plants
- Civil engineering – Engineering discipline focused on physical infrastructure
- Engineering informatics
- Internet of things – Internet-like structure connecting everyday physical objects
- List of engineering branches – Disciplines into which the field of engineering is conventionally divided
- Mechanical engineering – Engineering discipline
- Statistics – Study of collection and analysis of data
