= Fiasco =

Fiasco may refer to:

- a failure or humiliating situation
- Fiasco (bottle), a traditional Italian straw-covered wine bottle often associated with Chianti wine

== Media ==
- Fiasco (novel), a 1987 science-fiction novel by Stanisław Lem
- Fiasco: The American Military Adventure in Iraq, a 2006 book by Thomas E. Ricks
- Fiasco (magazine), a British fashion magazine launched in 2010
- Fiasco (TV series), a 2024 French comedy TV mini-series
- "Fiasco" (Slow Horses), a 2022 television episode
- "Fiasco!" (SpongeBob SquarePants), a 2012 episode from season 8 of SpongeBob SquarePants
- Fíaskó (international title: Fiasco), a 2000 Icelandic film
- Fiasco, a podcast hosted by Leon Neyfakh

== People with the surname ==
- Lupe Fiasco (born 1982), American rapper

== Other uses ==
- Fiasco (band), a rock trio formed in Brooklyn, New York City in 2005
- Fiasco (role-playing game), a game designed to create a Coen-brothers-style story
- Fiasco, an open-source L4 microkernel family operating system developed at TU Dresden
- FIASCO, the name used by very early versions of PSPP, a free software application for analysis of sampled data
