= Persian Inscriptions on Indian Monuments =

Book by Hekmat E Shirazi

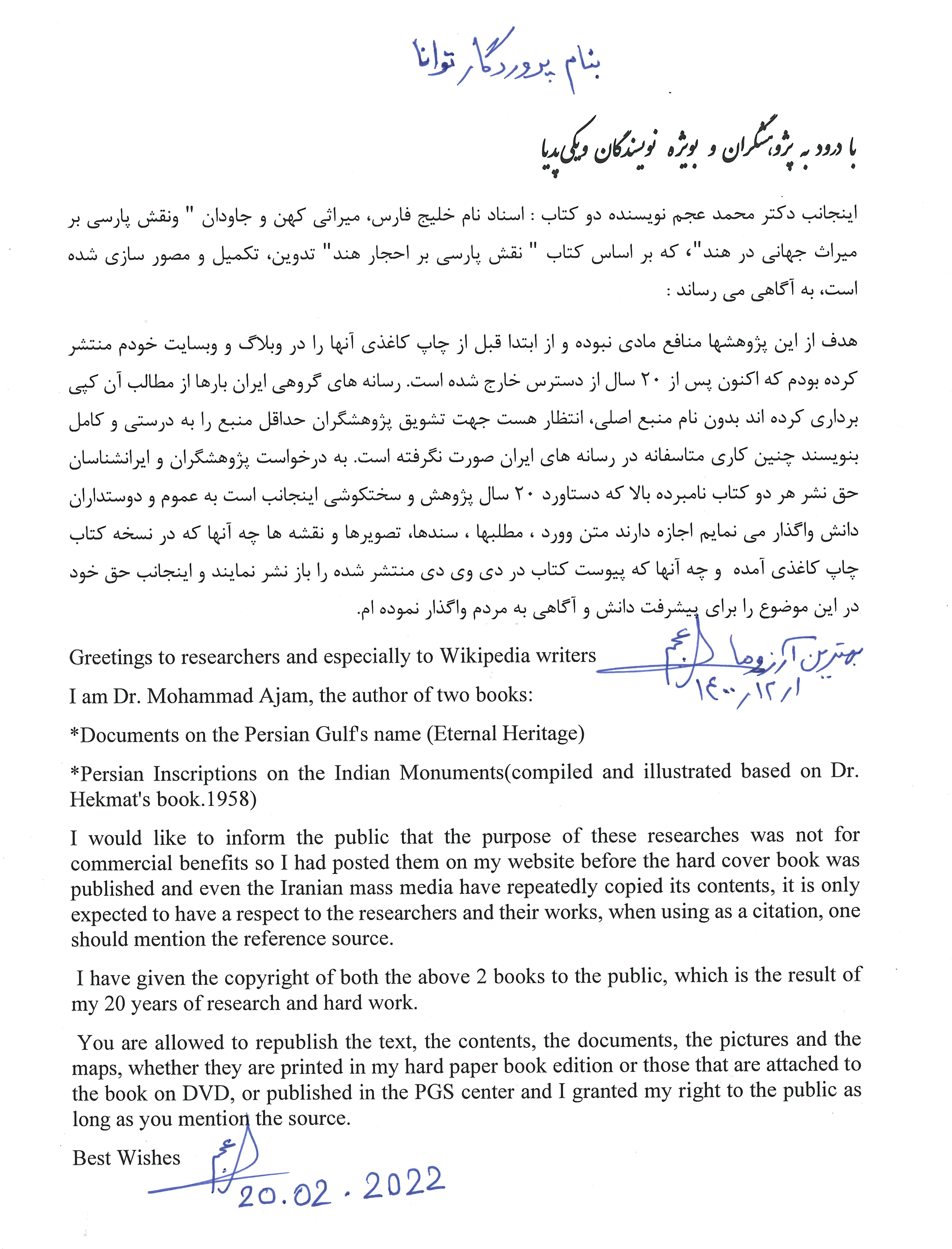
- Cover page for
- Author: Ali-Asghar Hekmat; Mohammad Ajam
- Original title: نقش پارسی بر احجار هند
- Illustrator: Mohammad Ajam
- Cover artist: Mohammad Ajam
- Language: Persian; English
- Subject: Persian Inscriptions on the Indian Monuments
- Published: 1956-1958-2013
- Publisher: Tehran University, Tehran
- Publication date: 1956- 1958 - 2013
- Website: web.archive.org/web/20201112200433/http://parssea.org/?p=3848

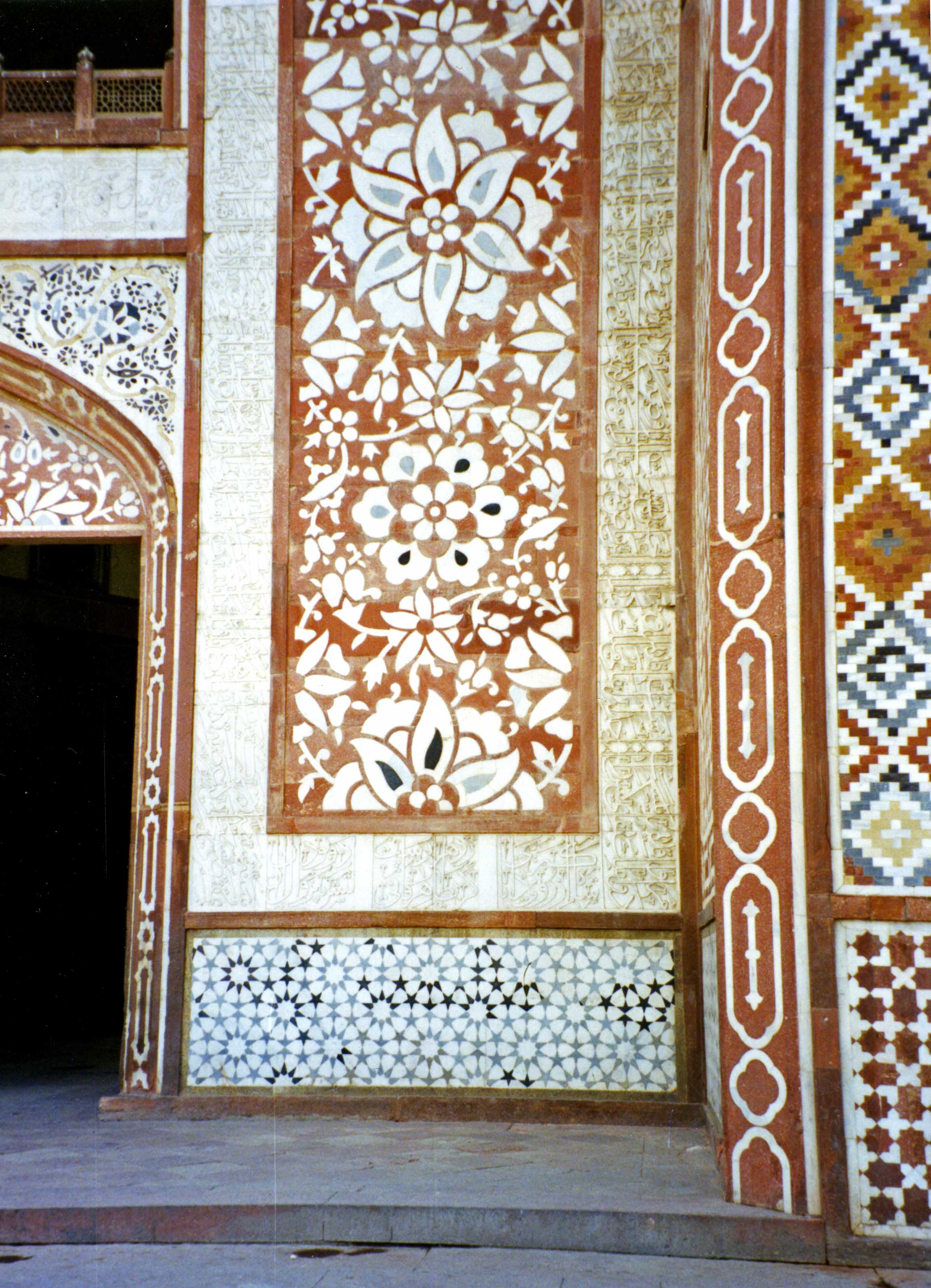
Akbar's tomb inscribed with Persian

Persian Inscriptions on Indian Monuments (Persian: نقش پارسی بر احجار هند, romanized: Naqš-i Pārsī dar Aḥjār-i Hind) is a book written in Persian by Ali-Asghar Hekmat and published in 1956 and 1958 and 2013. New edition contains the Persian texts of more than 200 epigraphical inscriptions found on historical monuments in India, many of which are currently listed as national heritage sites or registered as UNESCO world heritage, published in Persian; an English edition is also being printed.

== Third edition ==
After being forgotten for over 50 years, a third edition of the book has been printed by Mohammad Ajam. the absence of the book was felt particularly by students of the Persian language and literature, as well as linguistics. The new edition includes images of many of the inscriptions it describes, as well as a new seventh chapter consisting of five parts.The new edition of the book has been published under a different title: Persian Inscriptions on the Indian World Heritage Sites. because many of the stone inscriptions it describes have been preserved and registered as world heritage. The new edition contains more than 120 images.

== Book contents ==
In India, Persian inscriptions are usually found on buildings such as mosques and tombs, or on secular edifices including forts, palaces, gateways, water tanks, wells, gardens and bridges. Certain movable objects such as seals, signets, vases and eating utensils often bear inscriptions too. Most pre-Mughal Indian Islamic and Persian inscriptions in India date from the last decade of the 12th century AD, when Muhammad Ghori conquered Delhi and established his sultanate there. However, a small number of inscriptions have been found in Haryana, Gujarat and Kerala which bear earlier dates.

In Persian, Arabic and (more recently) Urdu inscriptions found in India, the dynasties represented most prominently are the Mamluks, the Khaljis, the Tughluqs, the Sayyids, the Lodis, the Mughals and Surids. Many other regional dynasties also receive prominent representation in inscriptions within India. When the powerful Mughals (and Khorasanid) dynasties assumed power, they used Persian as the main language for all academic and administrative matters, including inscriptions, coins, official letters and many others. Under the later Mughals, many of the regional principalities became autonomous and continued using Persian as their official language. Later, when Urdu came into wider use, its existence was also recorded in inscriptions.

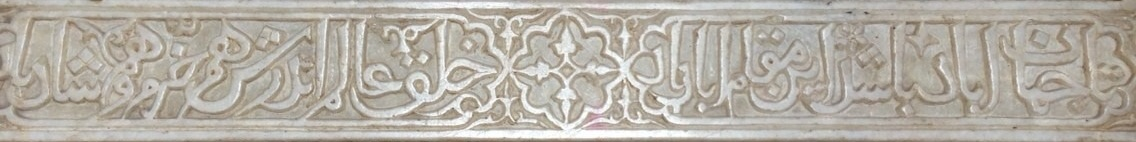
Persian inscriptions on Indian monuments

In addition to Arabic, Persian and Urdu inscriptions, there are also bilingual and even trilingual inscriptions (for example, in Arabic combined with regional languages such as Gujarati, Bengali, Tamil and Malayalam, or Persian combined with provincial languages such as Kannada, Telugu, Odia, Tamil, Gujarati and Marathi). Persian and mixed Quranic Arabic with Persian have been used alongside many other languages, including Sanskrit, Hindi, English, Portuguese and many others. Examples of such inscriptions can be found in Qutb Minar at New Delhi, the Akbar's tomb at Sikandara, Kanpur Dehat, Uttar Pradesh, the Adina Mosque at Pandua, Malda, West Bengal, the Taj Mahal at Agra and many other locations. In addition, Arabic and Persian inscriptions can be found written in various different popular scripts or styles of Islamic Persian calligraphy, including Kufi, Naskh, Thuluth, Ruqʿah and Nastaliq. The book describes many palaces, forts, tombs and mosques inscribed with Persian Inscriptions.

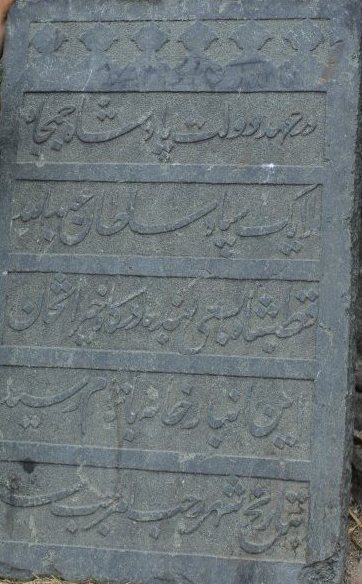
Persian inscriptions on Indian monuments

Mughal dynasty or Mughal Persian dynasty who originally came from the Greater Khorasan and are known in Iran and Afghanistan as the Gurkanid dynasty also had link to the Ghurid dynasty. Mughal Persian dynasty begins with Babur (a Persian word meaning "tiger"). His grandson Akbar I developed Indo-Persian culture and the Mughal architecture style developed vigorously during his reign. Among his accomplishments were Agra Fort, the fort-city of Fatehpur Sikri, and the Buland Darwaza. Akbar's son Jahangir commissioned the Shalimar Gardens at Dal Lake, Srinagar, Jammu and Kashmir and Humayun's Tomb at Delhi.

Indo-Persian culture reached its zenith during the reign of Shah Jahan, who constructed Taj Mahal at Agra, Uttar Pradesh, the Jama Masjid at Delhi; as well as the Shalimar Gardens , the Wazir Khan Mosque, and who renovated the Lahore Fort, all in Lahore, Punjab. The last of the great Mughal architects was Aurangzeb, who built the Badshahi Mosque in Lahore as well.

== First chapter ==
The first chapter of the book is dedicated to the history of Persian inscription in India, describing the history of epigraphy up to the initial development of Islam and beyond. Sasanian Persian inscriptions can be found in the Ajanta caves, on many coins dating from the reign of Pulakeshin II and on the crosses of churches such as St. Thomas Mount and St. Thome Cathedral Basilica in Chennai and St. Mary's Orthodox Diocese at Valiyapally, Bengaluru, Karnataka.

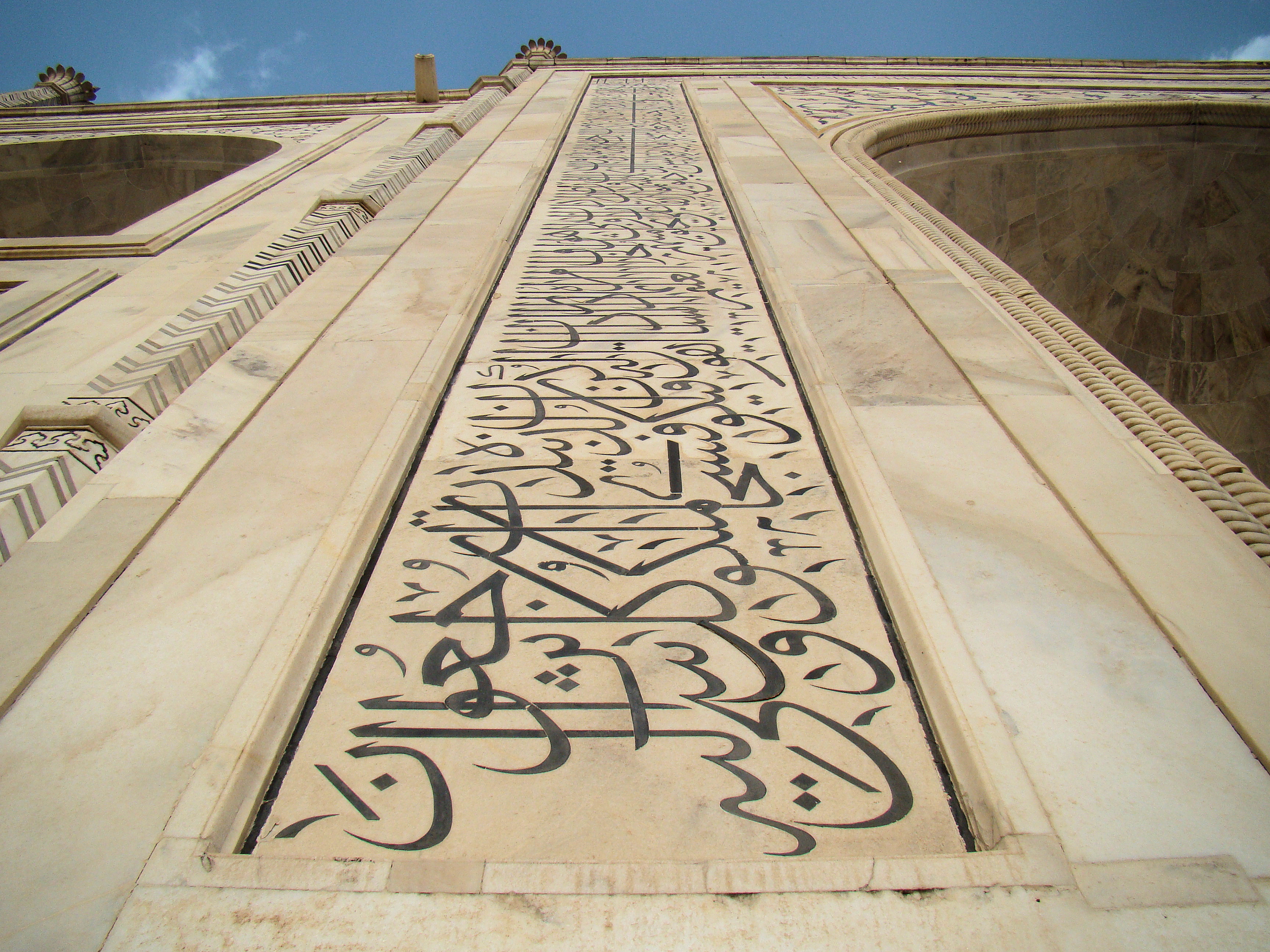
Islamic Persian calligraphy on a large pishtaq/iwan at the Taj Mahal, Agra, India

== Palaces, citadels ==
The book describes Persian Inscriptions on many palaces and fort in India including:

1. The Red Fort (or Red Castle) is a historic fort in the city of Delhi that served as the main residence of the Mughal emperors. Emperor Shah Jahan commissioned construction of the Red Fort on 12 May 1638, when he decided to shift his capital from Agra to Delhi. Originally red and white, Shah Jahan's favourite colours, its design is credited to architect Ustad Ahmad Lahori, who also constructed the Taj Mahal. It was constructed between May 1639 and April 1648. It was conquered by Nader Shah of the Afsharid dynasty in Iran during the Battle of Karnal.
2. In the Rashtrapati Bhavan and the buildings in this complex, there are many Persian inscriptions, especially in the hall of Ashoka (former Parsika). Rashtrapati Bhavan is the official residence of the President of India; it may refer to only the 340-room main building that has the president's official residence, including reception halls, guest rooms and offices, also called the mansion; it may also refer to the entire 130-hectare (320-acre) Presidential Estate that additionally includes huge presidential gardens (Amrit Udyan), large open spaces, residences of bodyguards and staff, stables, other offices and utilities within its perimeter walls.
  A short film about Rashtrapati Bhavan
  In terms of area, it is the largest residence of any head of state in the world.

== Mausoleums ==
The book describes 47 Mausoleum and tombs in India inscribed with Persian Inscriptions.

1. Mausoleum of Akbar or Akbar's tomb is the tomb of the Mughal emperor Akbar. This tomb is an important Mughal architectural masterpiece. It was built in 1605–1613 by his son Jahangir and is situated in 119 acres of grounds in Sikandra, a sub of Agra, the best marble stone inscribed with Persian Inscriptions and poem.

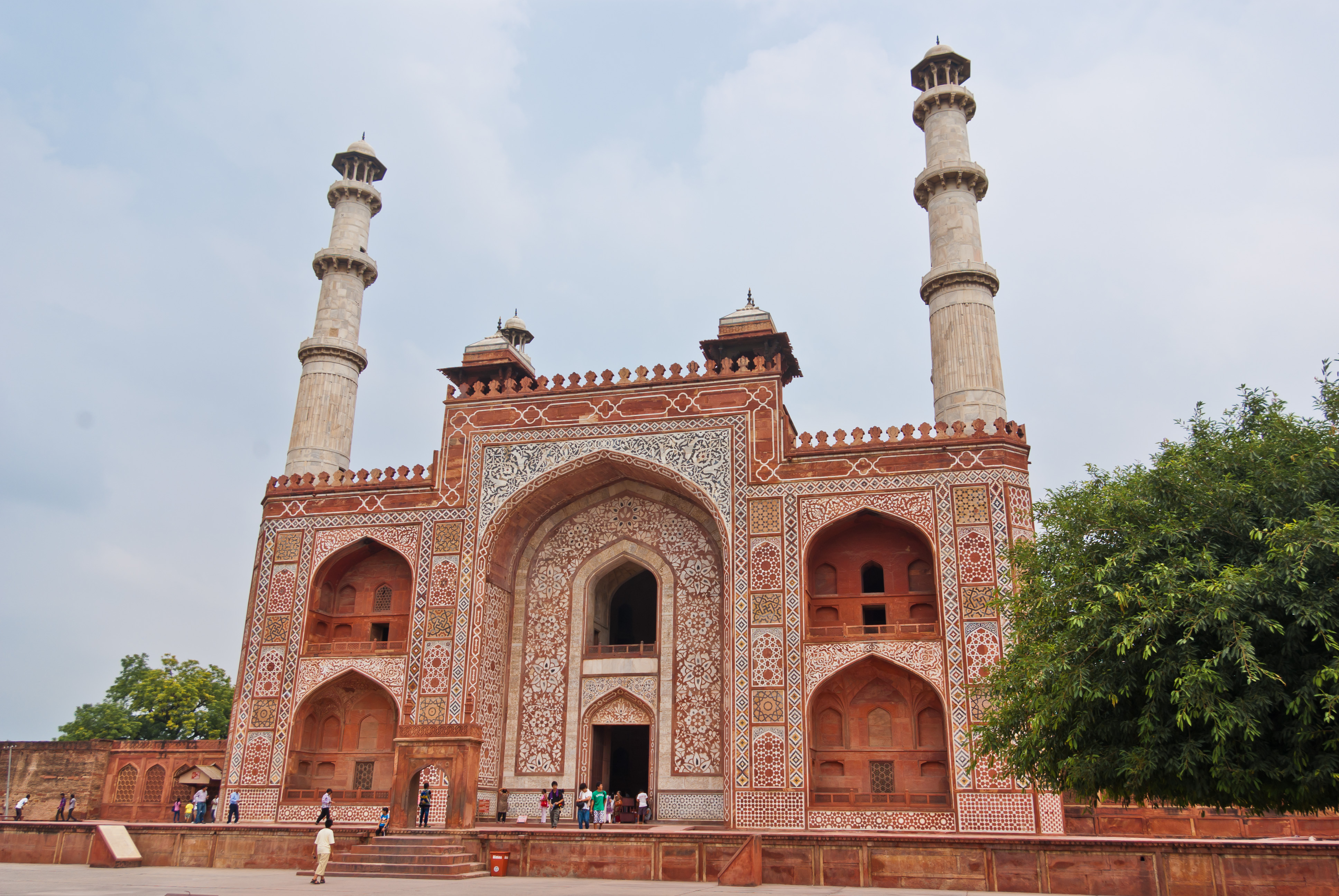
Akbar's tomb of external entrance from the road, built to imitate the Buland Darwaza at Fatehpur Sikri, the city that Akbar founded

== Persian inscriptions in mosques ==
The book had described Persian inscription in the 14 mosques in India including:

1. The Jama Masjid, Delhi of Delhi, is one of the largest mosques in India. It was built by the Mughal Emperor Shah Jahan between 1650 and 1656 The mosque was completed in 1656 AD with three great gates and two 40 metres high minarets constructed with strips of red sandstone and white marble. The courtyard can accommodate more than 25,000 people. There are three domes on the terrace which are surrounded by the two minarets. The architectural plan of Badshahi Masjid, built by Shah Jahan's son Aurangzeb at Lahore, Pakistan, is similar to the Jama Masjid.

. Shah Jahan also built the Taj Mahal, at Agra and the Red Fort in Shahjahanabad (i.e., Old Delhi), which stands opposite the Jama Masjid. It remained the royal mosque of the emperors until the end of the Mughal period.

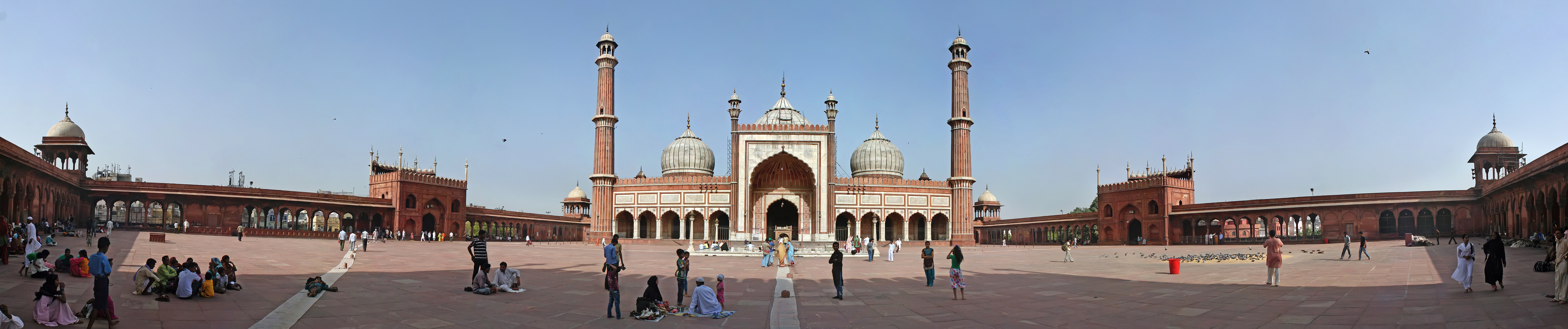
Jamamasjid

1. Jamia Masjid is a mosque in Srinagar, Jammu and Kashmir, India. Situated at Nowhatta in the middle of the Old City, the Mosque was commissioned by Sultan Sikandar in 1394 CE and completed in 1402 CE, at the behest of Mir Mohammad Hamadani, son of Mir Sayyid Ali Hamadani, and is regarded as one of the most important mosques in Kashmir.The Mosque is located in Downtown which remains a central zone to the religio-political life in Srinagar. Thronged by Muslims every Friday, it is one of the prime tourist attractions of Srinagar.
- Babri Masjid (meaning "mosque of Babur (tiger)") was a mosque in Ayodhya, Uttar Pradesh, India; at a site regarded by Hindus to be the birthplace (Rama Janmabhumi) of Hindu deity Rama (now the Ram Mandir stands in its place).

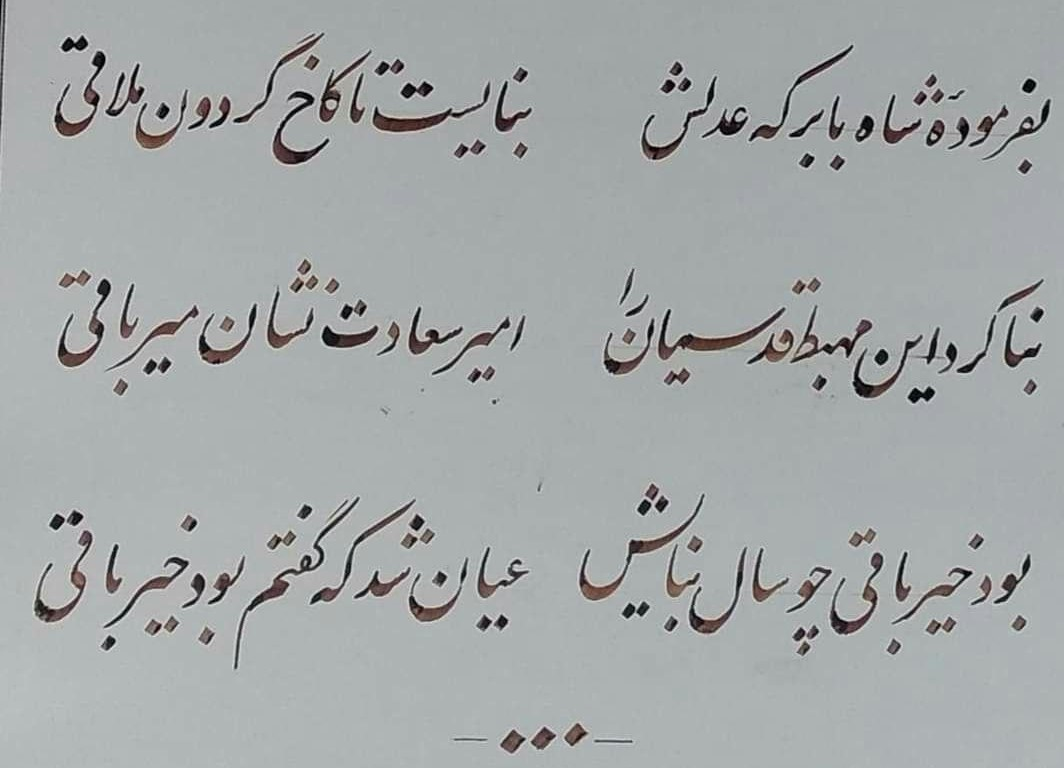
a replica from the Babri Mosque inscription

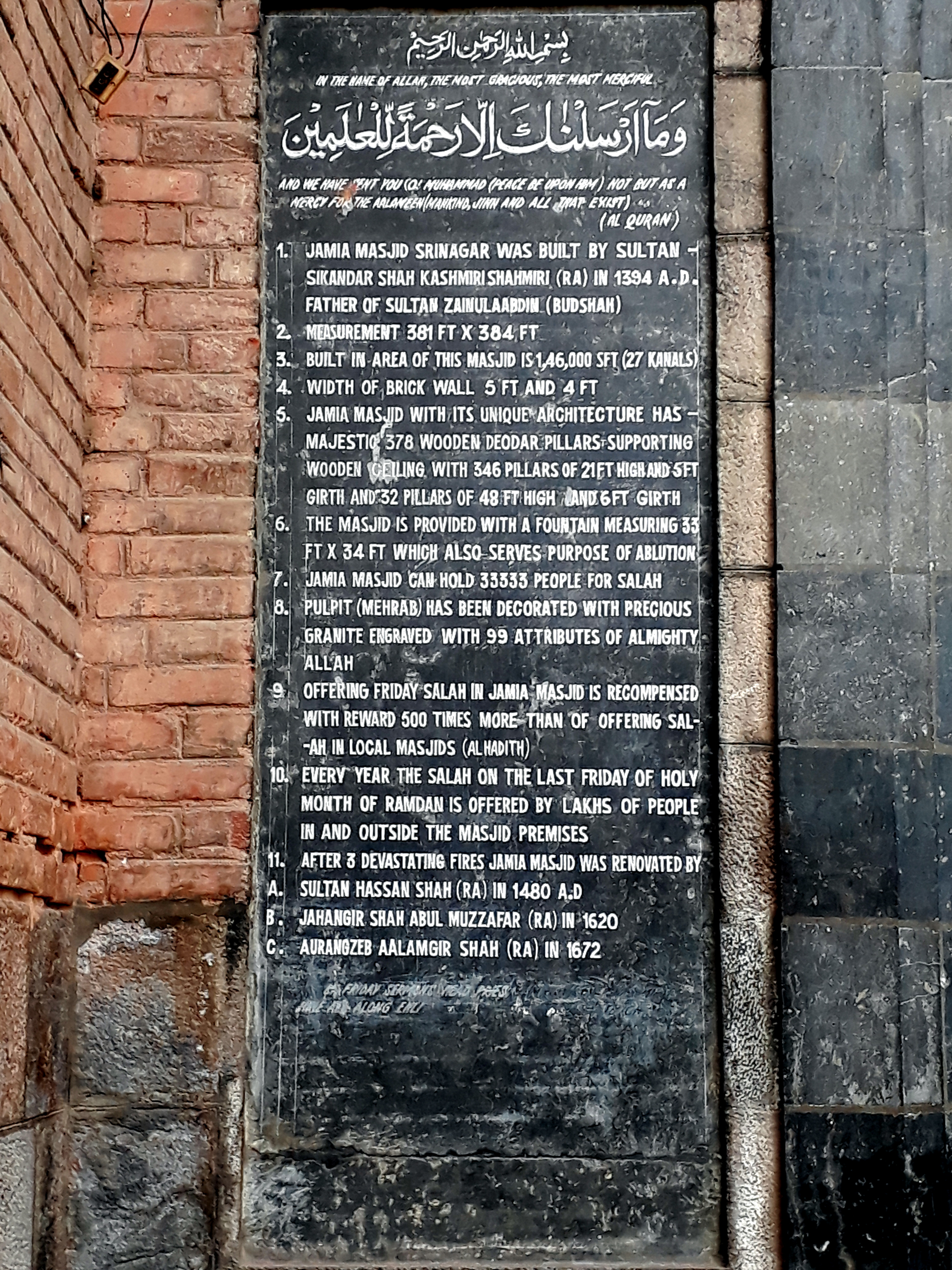
Plaque of Jamia Masjid another plaque is the order of the shahjahan in Persian

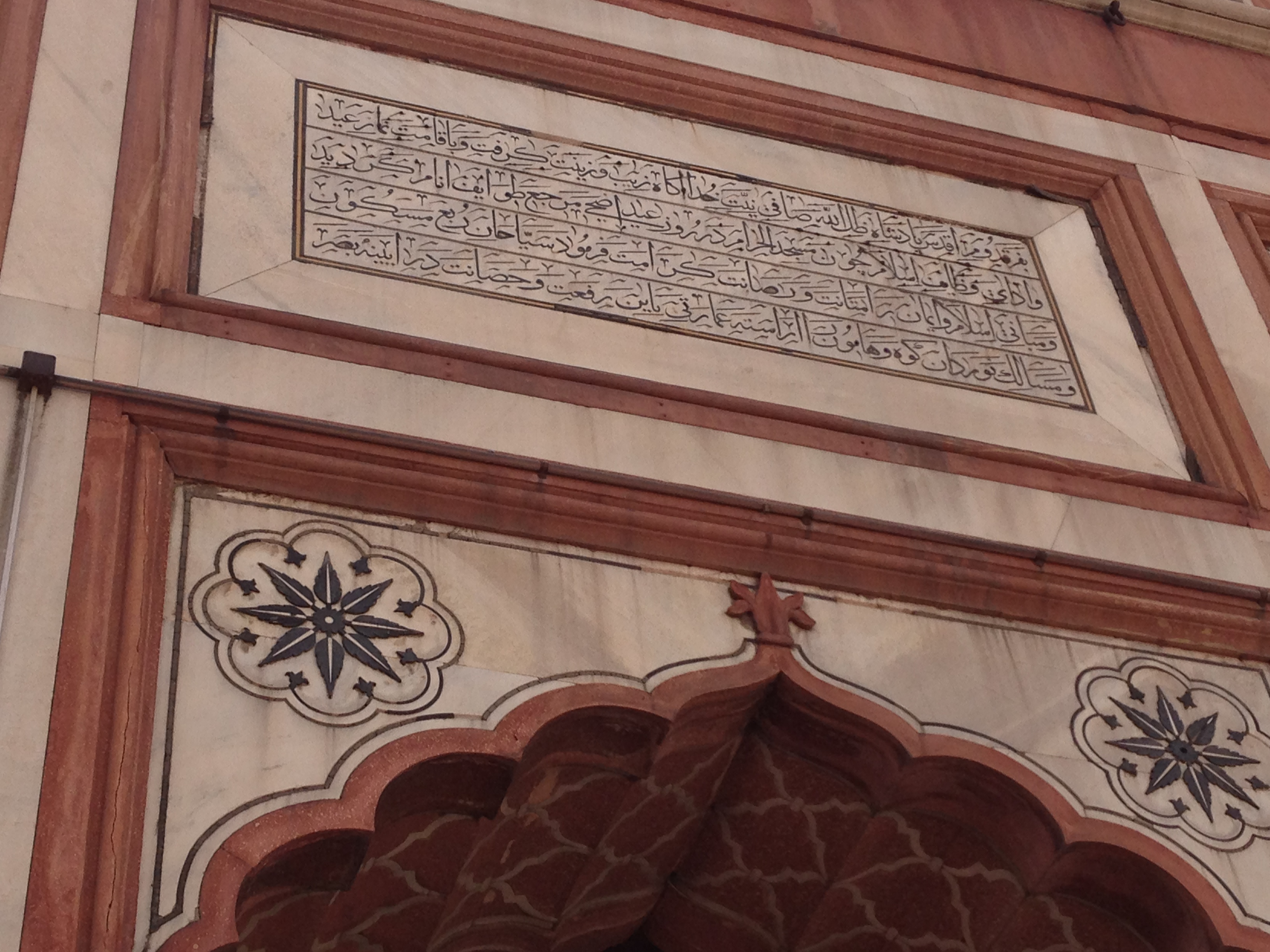
Jama Masjid with 10 Persian plaques

1. Jama Mosque, Agra
2. Jama Mosque, Fatehpur Sikri
3. Qutb Minar complex
4. Jama Mosque, Jaunpur
- Bahmani Sultanate

=== Akbar works to develop Indo-Persian culture ===
- Agra Fort Agra fort is a UNESCO world heritage site in Agra, Uttar Pradesh. Jahangiri Mahal and Humayun's Tomb Humayun’s Tomb, is often regarded as the first mature example of Mughal architecture.
- Fatehpur Sikri,
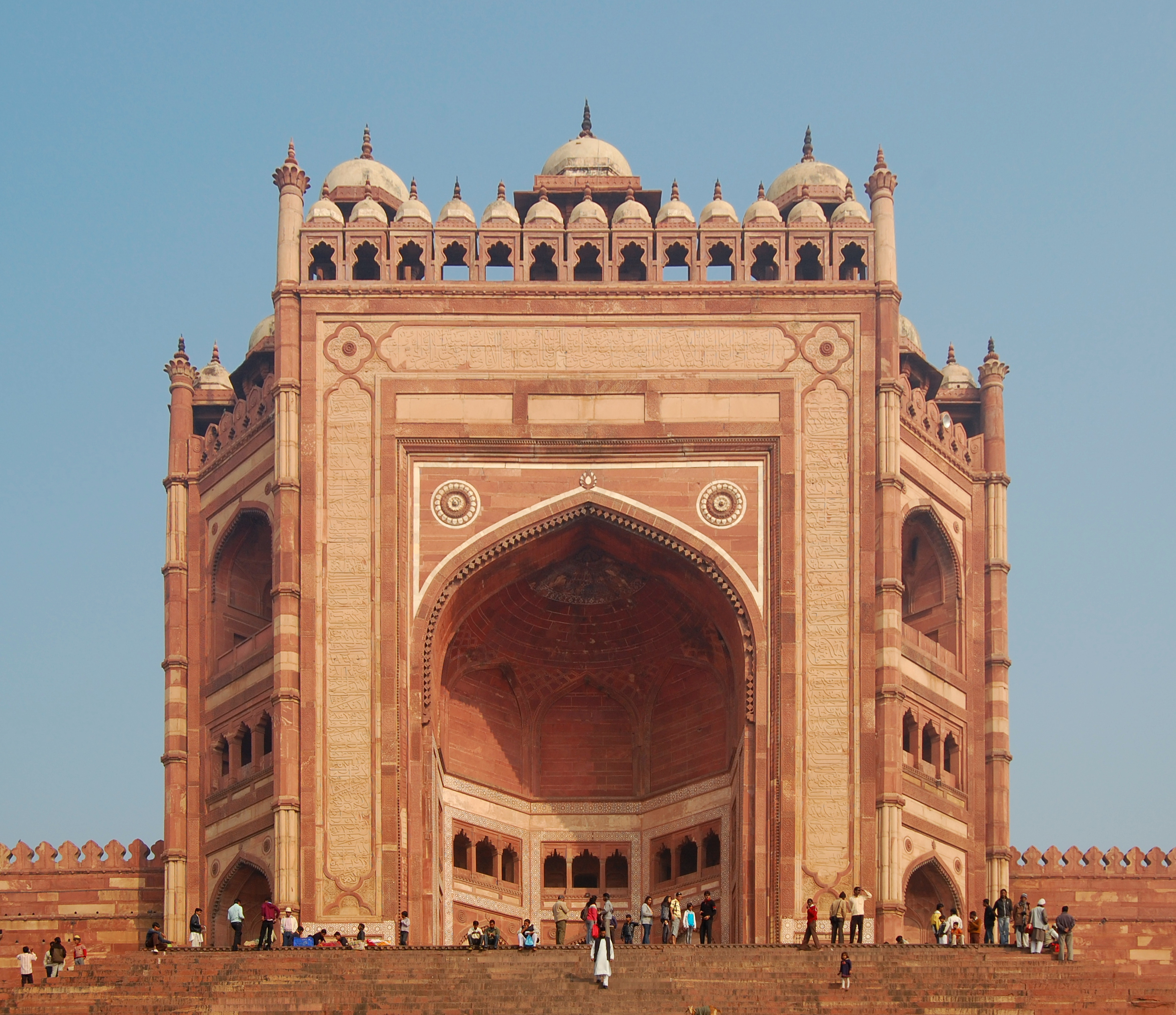
  Buland Darwaza, Agra was built by Akbar the Great to commemorate his victory.

The main religious buildings were the huge Jama Masjid and small Tomb of Salim Chishti. Buland Darwaza (also known as the "gate of magnificence"), was built by Akbar in 1576 to commemorate his victory over Gujarat and the Deccan. The tomb of Salim Chishti is famed as one of the finest examples of Mughal architecture in India, built during the years 1580 and 1581.

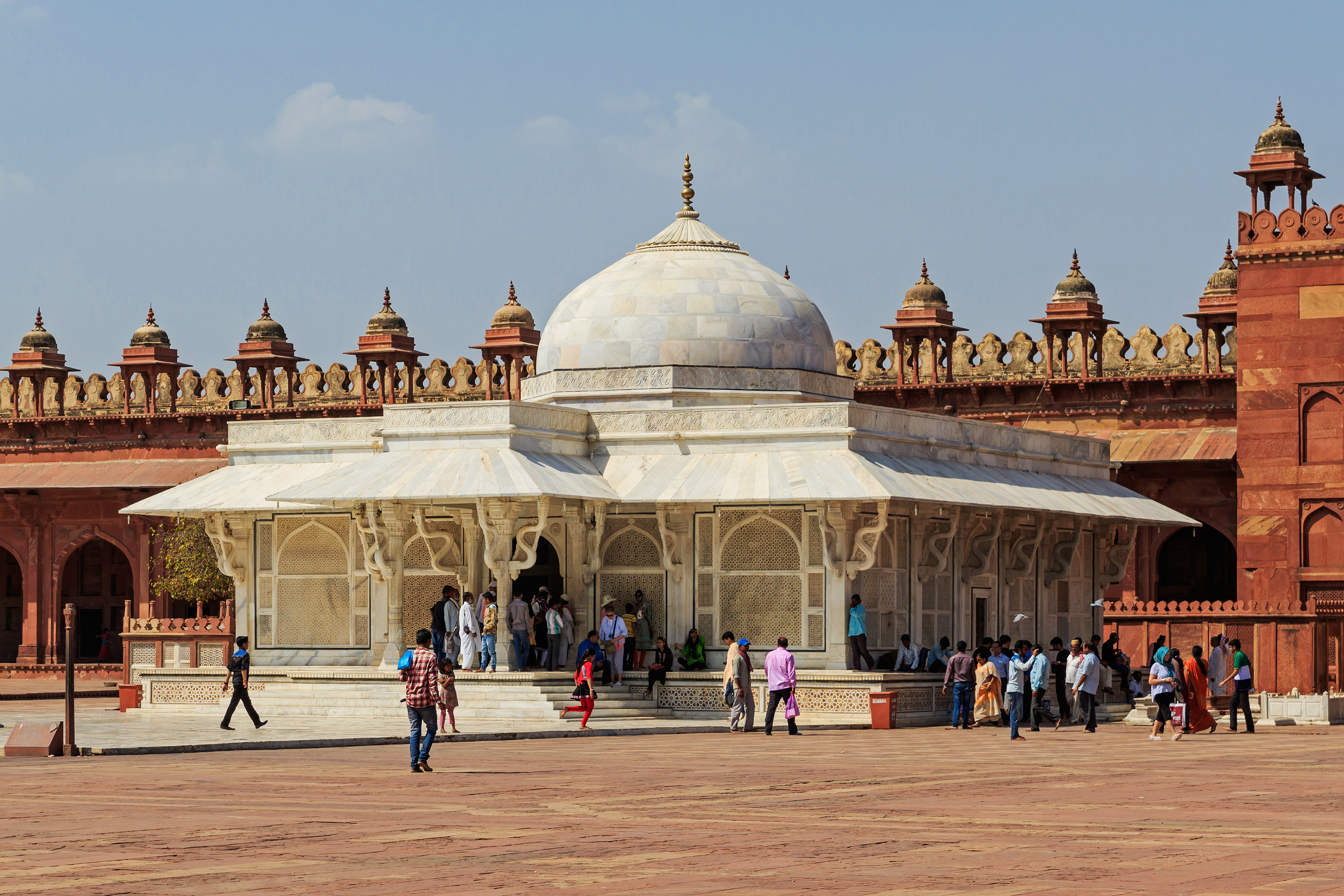
The tomb of Shaikh Salim Chisti is considered to be one of the finest examples of Mughal architecture

- The Begum Shahi Mosque is an early 17th-century mosque situated in the Walled City of Lahore, Pakistan. The mosque was built between 1611 and 1614 during the reign of Mughal Emperor Jahangir by his mother, Mariam-uz-Zamani, and is Lahore's earliest dated Mughal-era mosque. It is known for its exquisite fresco decoration of geometric and floral motifs painted on stucco, along with inscriptions of the names of God.

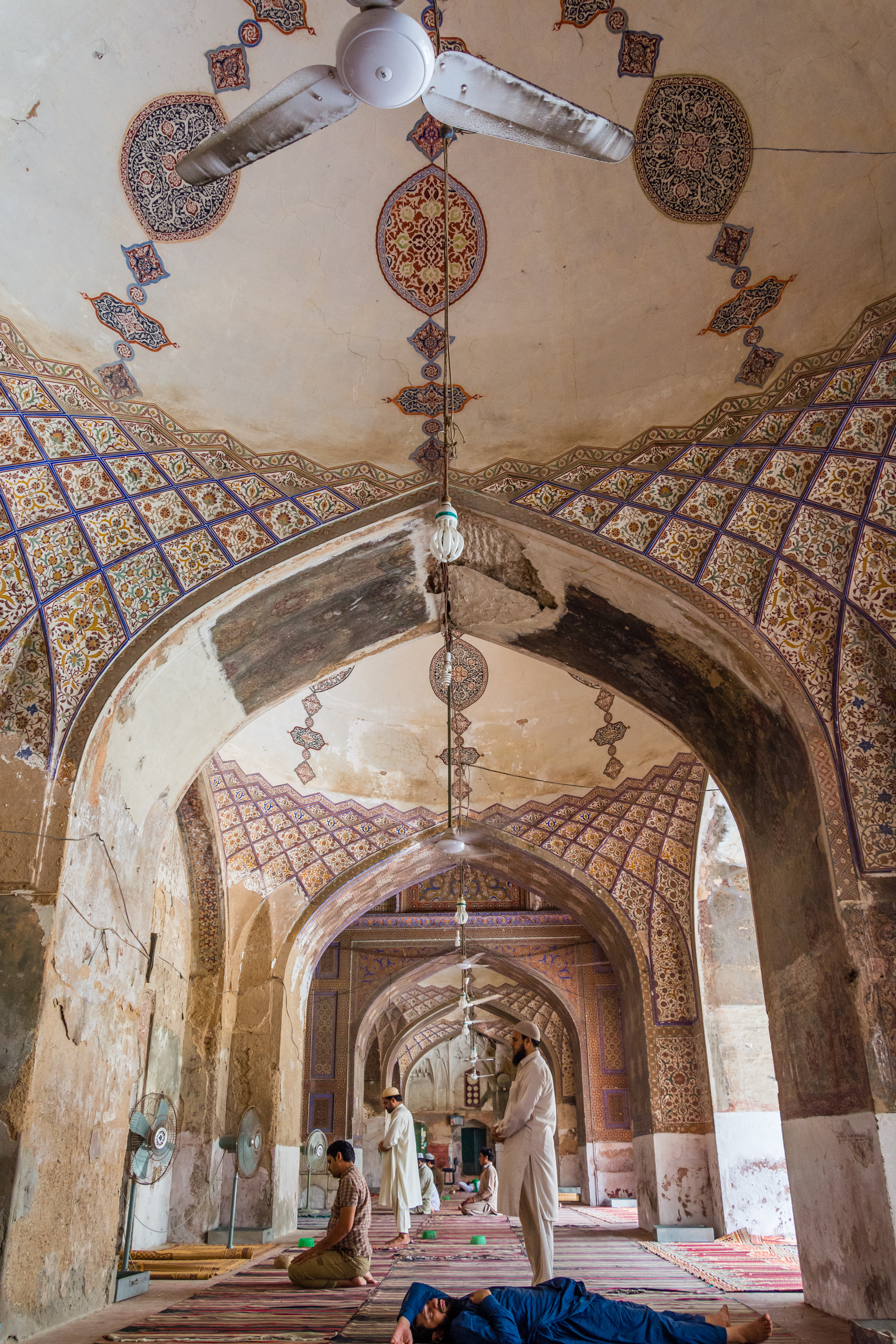
Begum Shahi Mosque is Lahore's earliest dated Mughal period mosque

- Tomb of I'timād-ud-Daulah
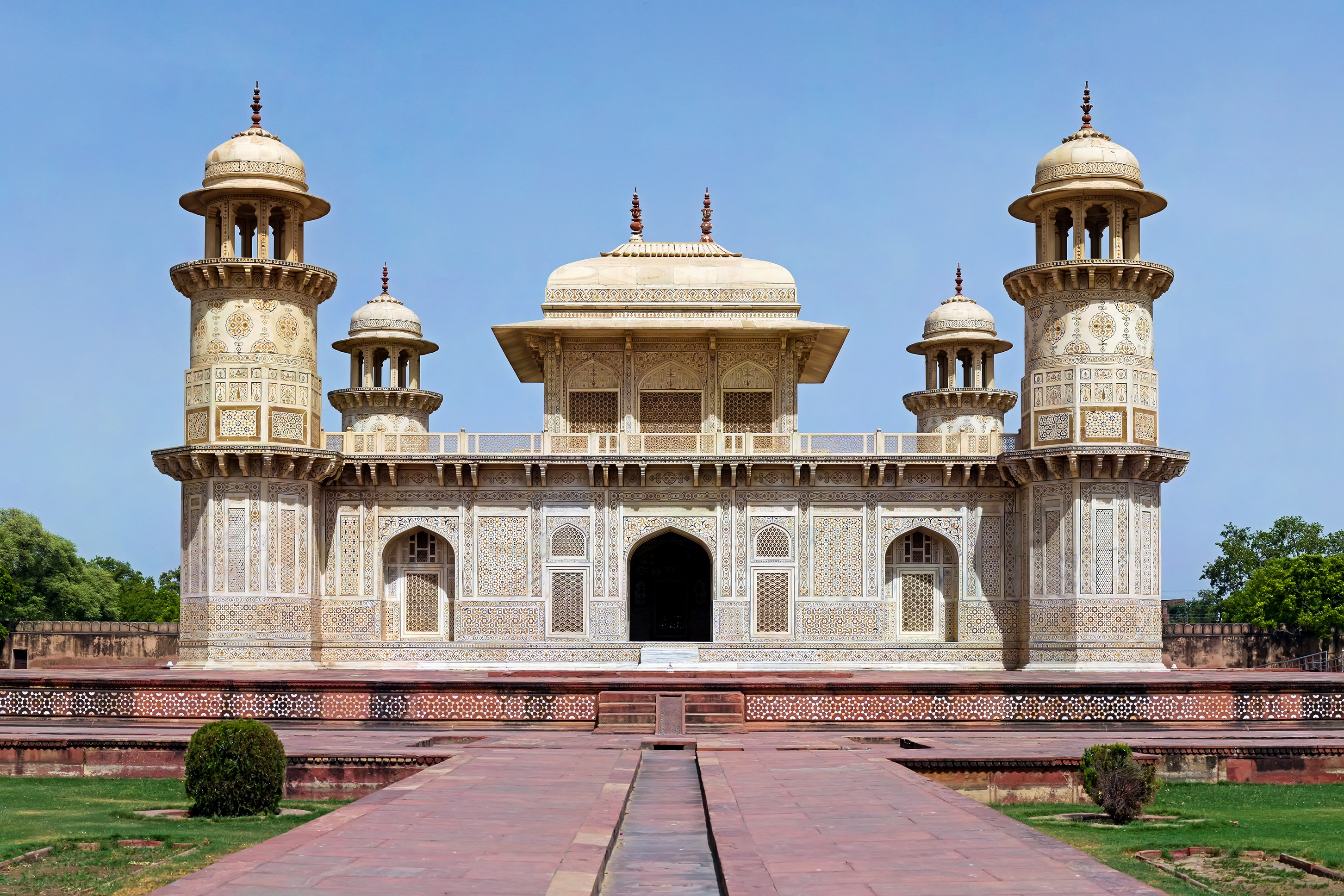
  The tomb of I'timād-ud-Daulah is often regarded as a draft of the Tāj Mahal.

The tomb of I'timād-ud-Daulah mausoleum in the city of Agra in the Indian state of Uttar Pradesh. the tomb of I'timād-ud-Daulah is often regarded as a draft of the Taj Mahal. Shahi Bridge, Jaunpur was also constructed during the reign of the Mughal Emperor Akbar.

=== Shah Jahan ===
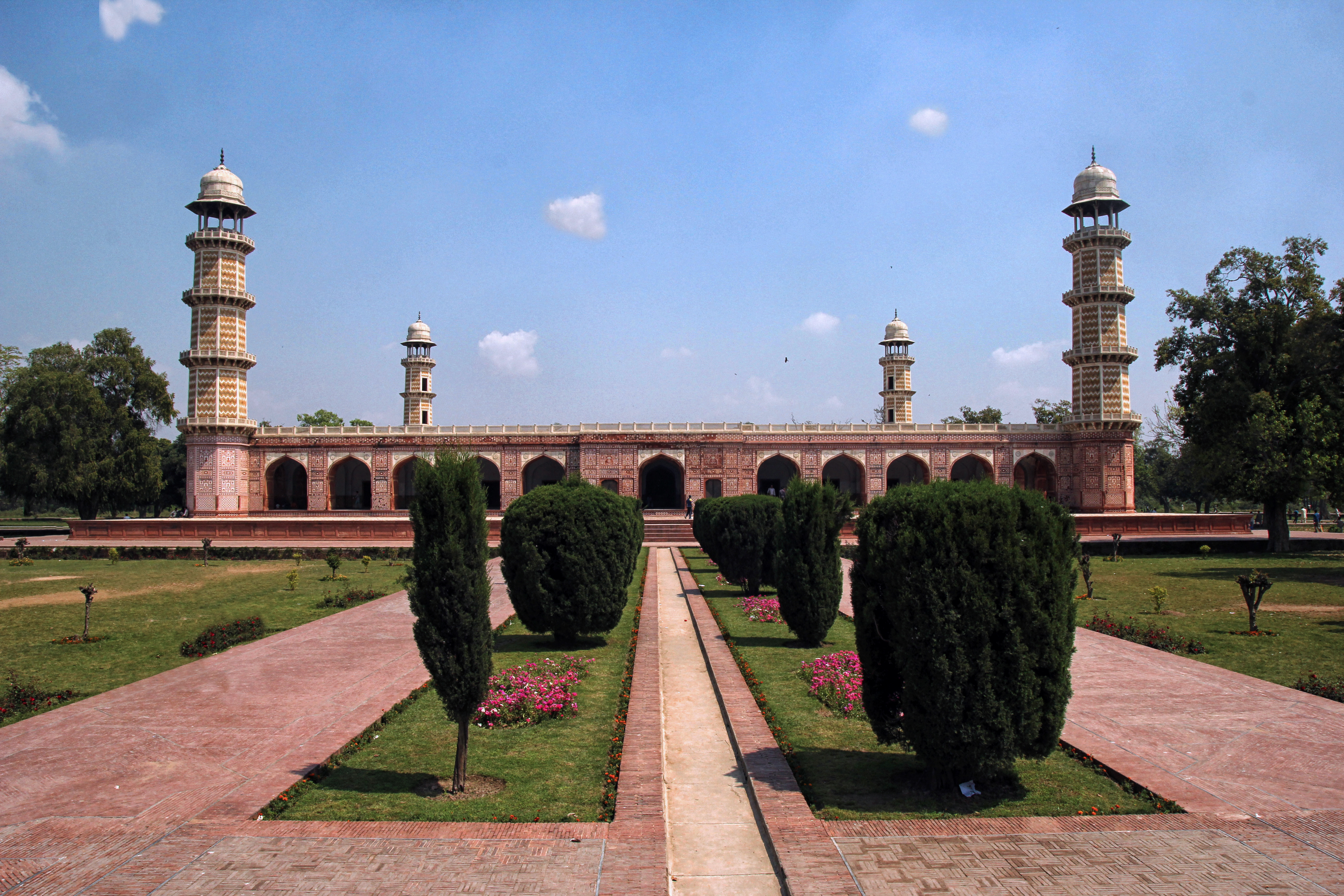
The Tomb of Jahangir at Lahore does not have a dome as Jahangir forbade construction of a dome over his tomb.

The Wazir Khan Mosque in Lahore was commissioned during the reign of Shah Jahan, his reign at Agra, Delhi and Lahore. Some examples include the Taj Mahal at Agra, the tomb of his wife Mumtaz Mahal. The Moti Masjid (meaning "pearl mosque") in the Lahore Fort and the Jama Masjid at Delhi are imposing buildings of his era, Shah Jahan also built sections of the Sheesh Mahal, and Naulakha pavilion, also in Thatta called Shahjahan Mosque. Shah Jahan also built the Red Fort in his new capital at Shah Jahanabad, now Delhi. The red sandstone Red Fort is noted for its special buildings-Diwan-i-Aam and Diwan-i-Khas.

- Taj Mahal The Taj Mahal, a World Heritage Site was built between 1630 and 1649
- Wazir Khan Mosque

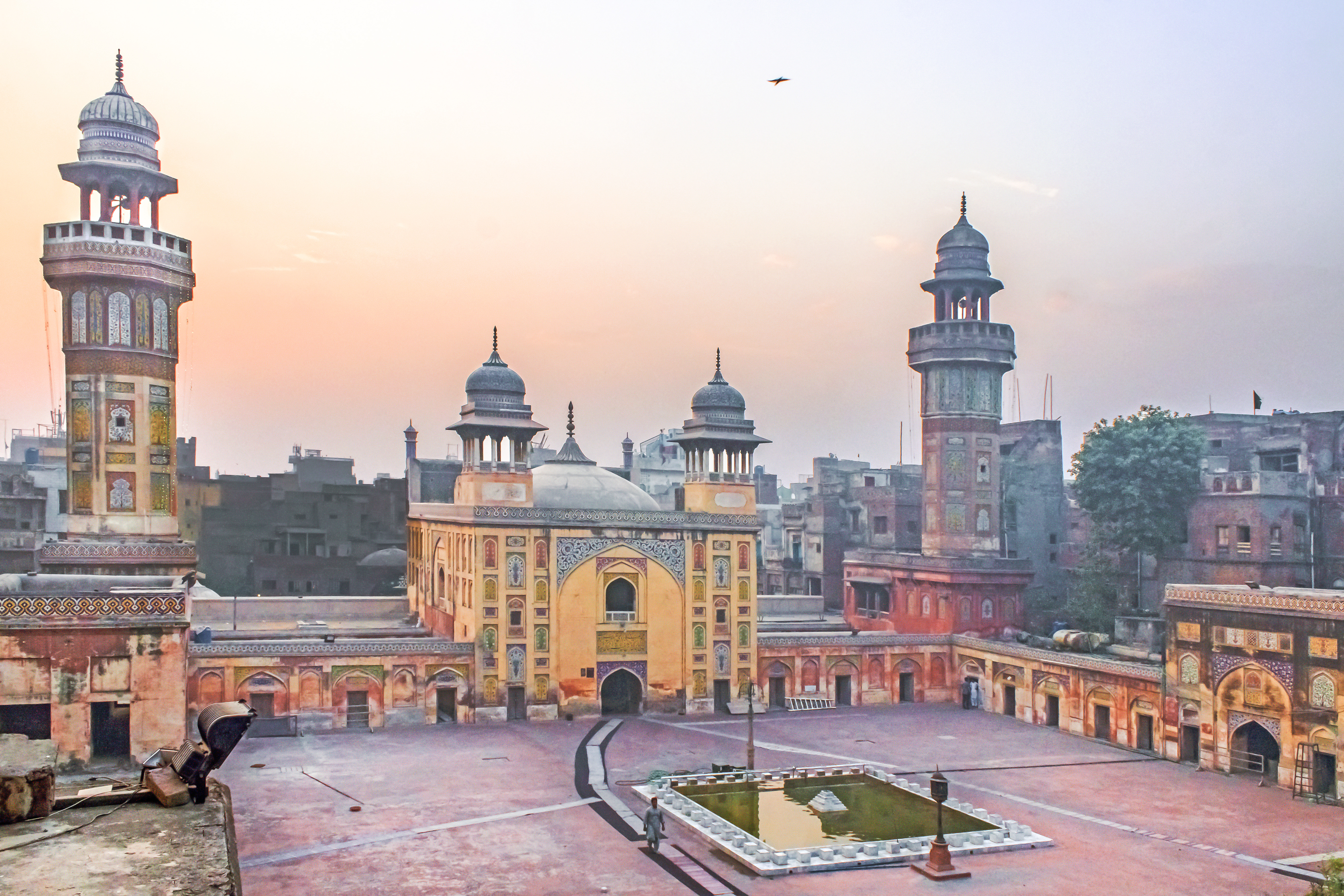
Wazir Khan Mosque in Lahore, Pakistan, is considered to be the most ornately decorated Mughal-era mosque

The Wazir Khan Mosque was commissioned during the reign of the Mughal Emperor Shah Jahan in 1634, and completed in 1642

- Shalimar Gardens
- The Shah Jahan Mosque is the jama masjid (congregational mosque) for the city of Thatta, in the Pakistani province of Sindh.
- Shahi Hammam is a Persian-style bath which was built in Lahore, Pakistan, in 1635 C.E. during the reign of Emperor Shah Jahan.

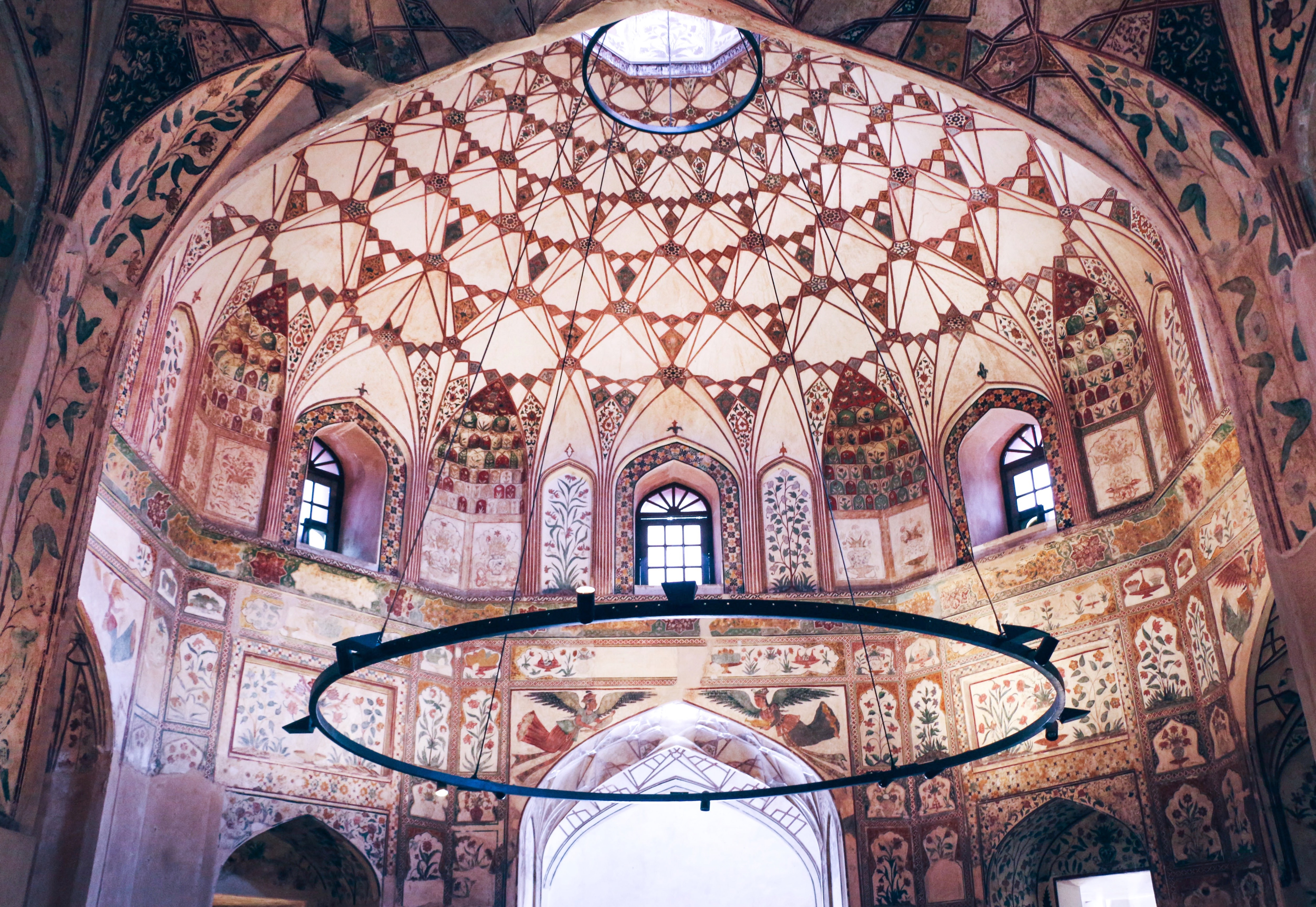
The central chamber of the Shahi Hammam is decorated with frescoes

In Aurangzeb's reign (1658–1707)

The Badshahi Mosque in Lahore, Pakistan was commissioned by the sixth Mughal Emperor Aurangzeb.

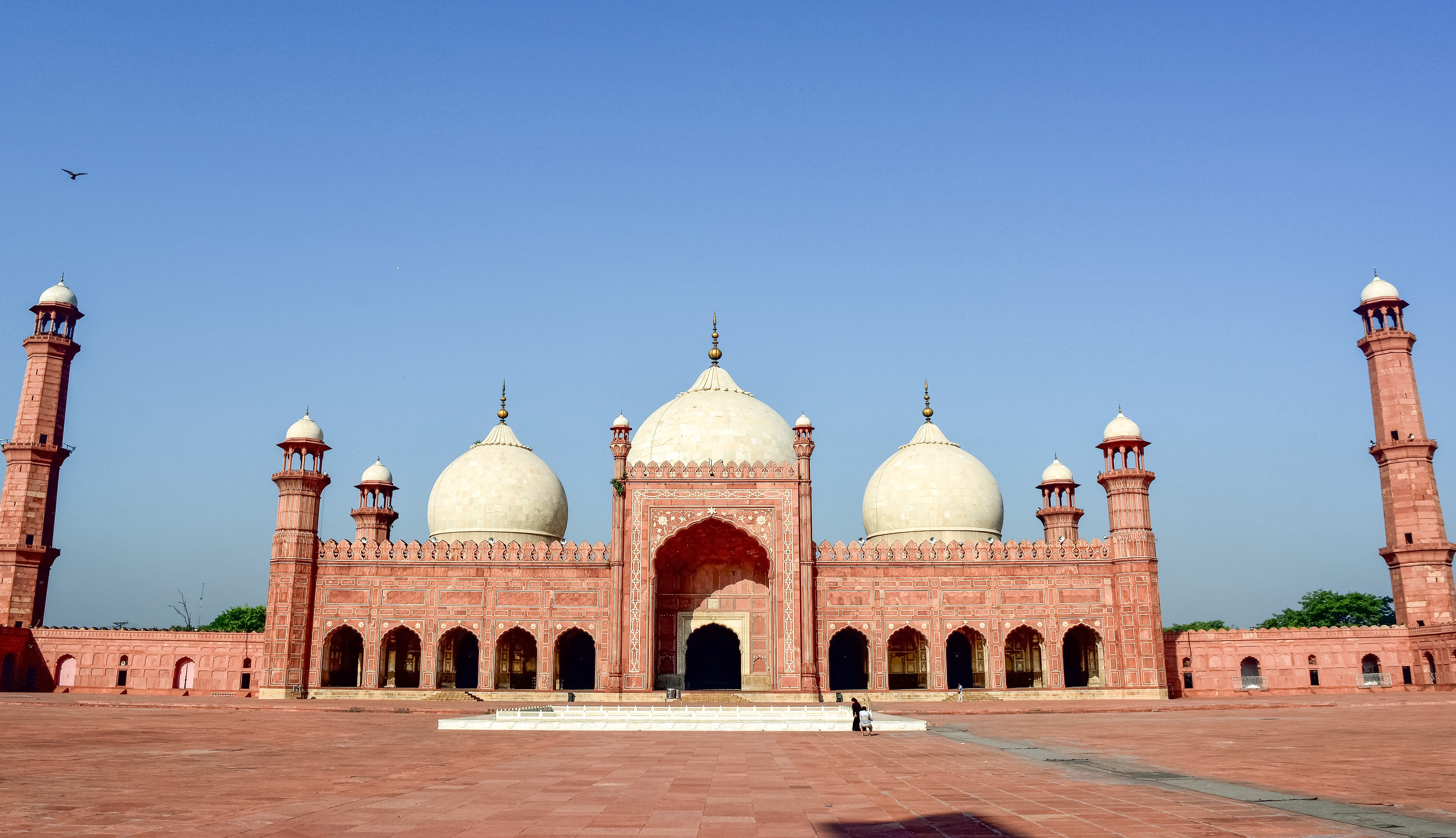
Badshahi Masjid, Lahore, Pakistan was the largest mosque in the world for 313 years, and is now the second largest mosque in the Indian subcontinent.

Additional monuments with Persian Mughal structure

Zinat al-Masjid in Daryaganj was overseen by Aurangzeb's second daughter Zinat-al-Nissa. Aurangzeb's sister Roshan-Ara who died in 1671. The tomb of Roshanara Begum

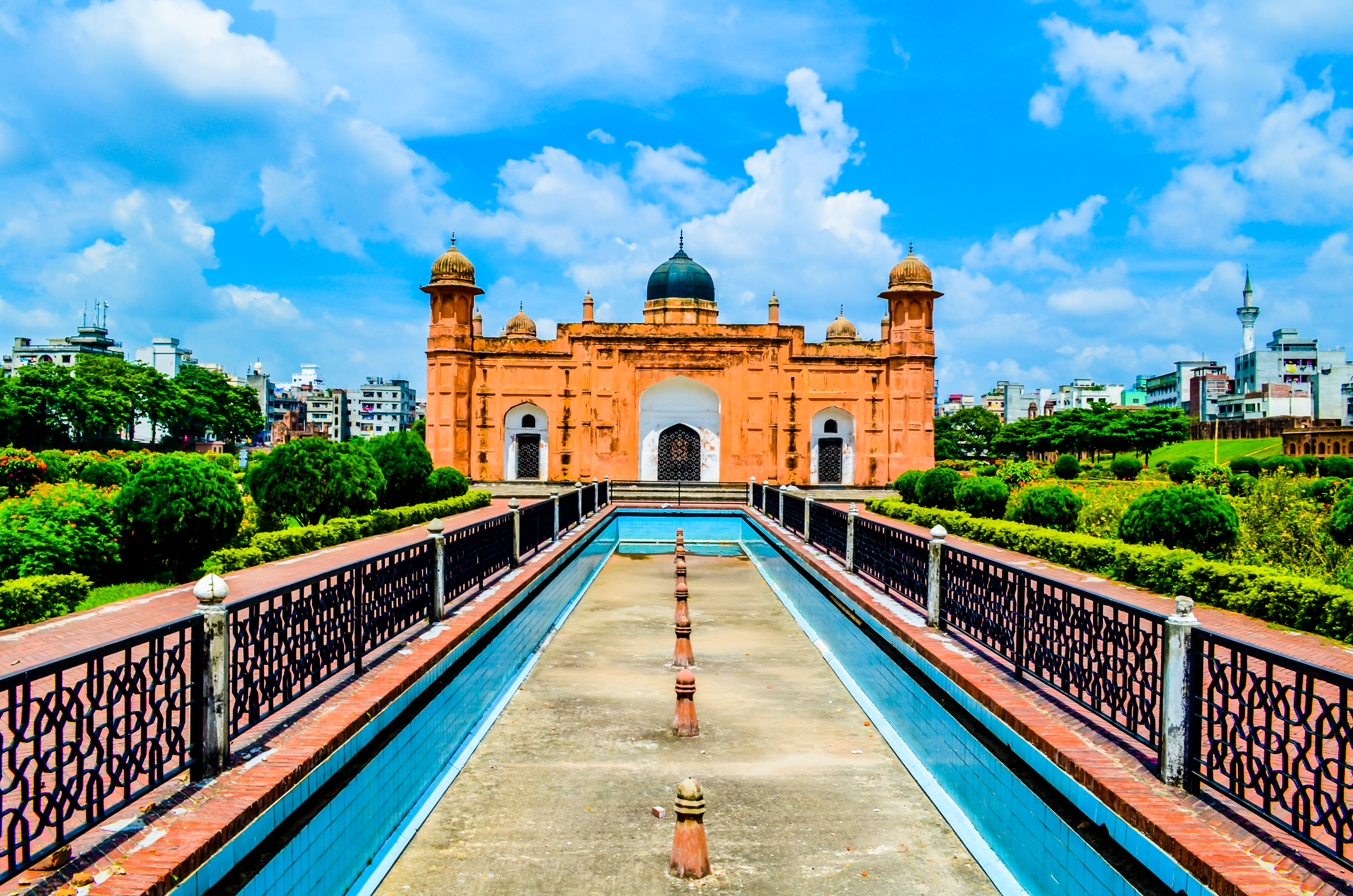
Lalbagh Fort in Dhaka was built in memory of Bibi Pari, the daughter of Shaista Khan who was governor of Bengal.

Lalbagh Fort (also known as "Fort Aurangabad"), Dhaka, Bangladesh, whose construction started in 1678 during the reign of Aurangzeb’s son Azam Shah.

- Sunehri Mosque
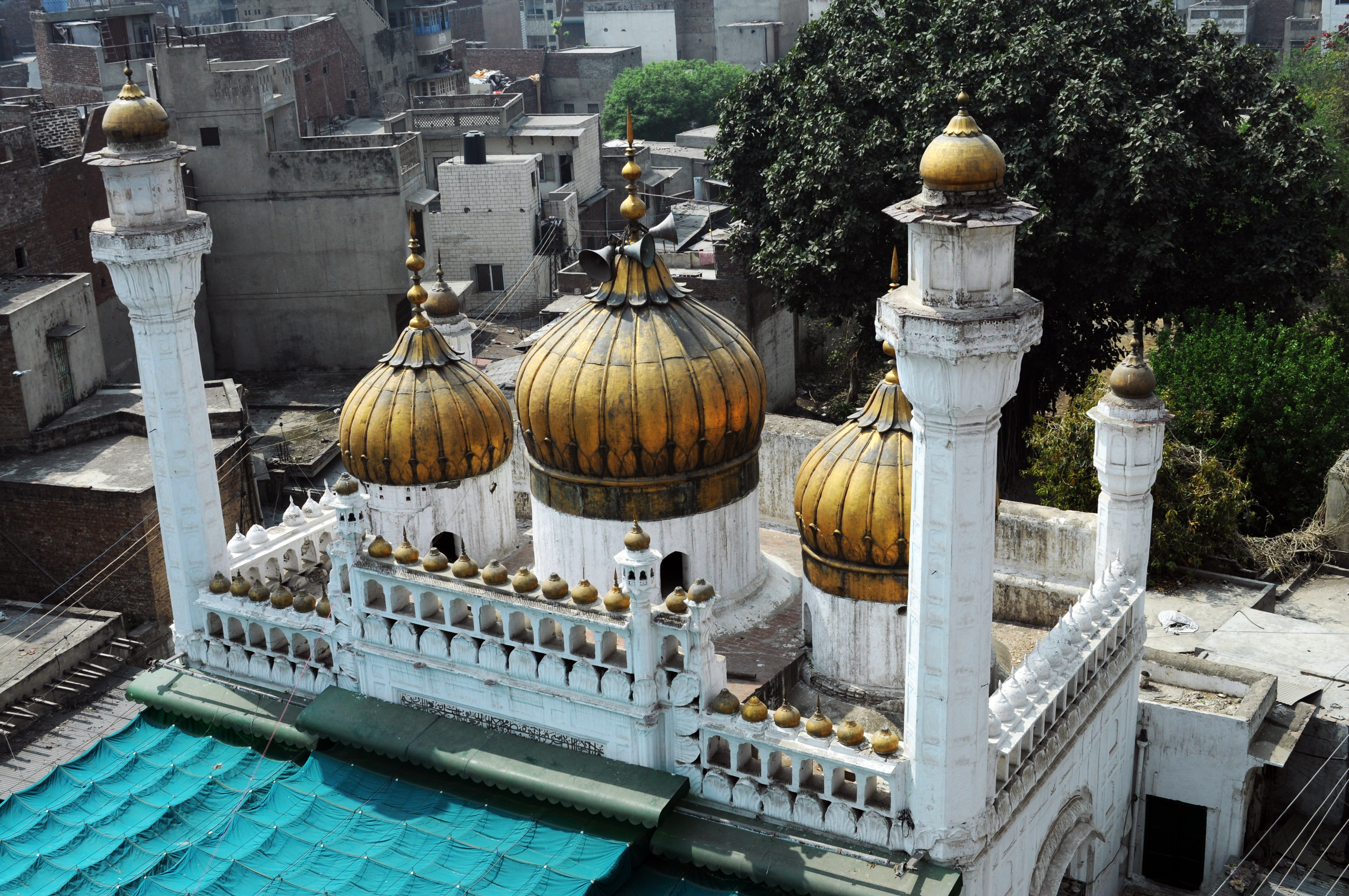
  The 18th Sunehri Mosque was built in 1753 when the empire was in decline, during the reign of Muhammad Shah.
- The Tomb of Safdar Jung completed in 1754 is one of the last examples of Mughal Architecture.

Mughal gardens This style was influenced by Persian gardens. Humayun's Tomb, was the first sample of later Mughal gardens.

=== First part of the Third edition ===
The first part from the new edition chapter added in 2013 contains a selection of Persian inscriptions found on the Hyderabad Monuments, dating from the time of the Qutb Shahi dynasty. It also contains inscriptions from the Golkonda fort and the Deccan in the Andhra Pradesh.

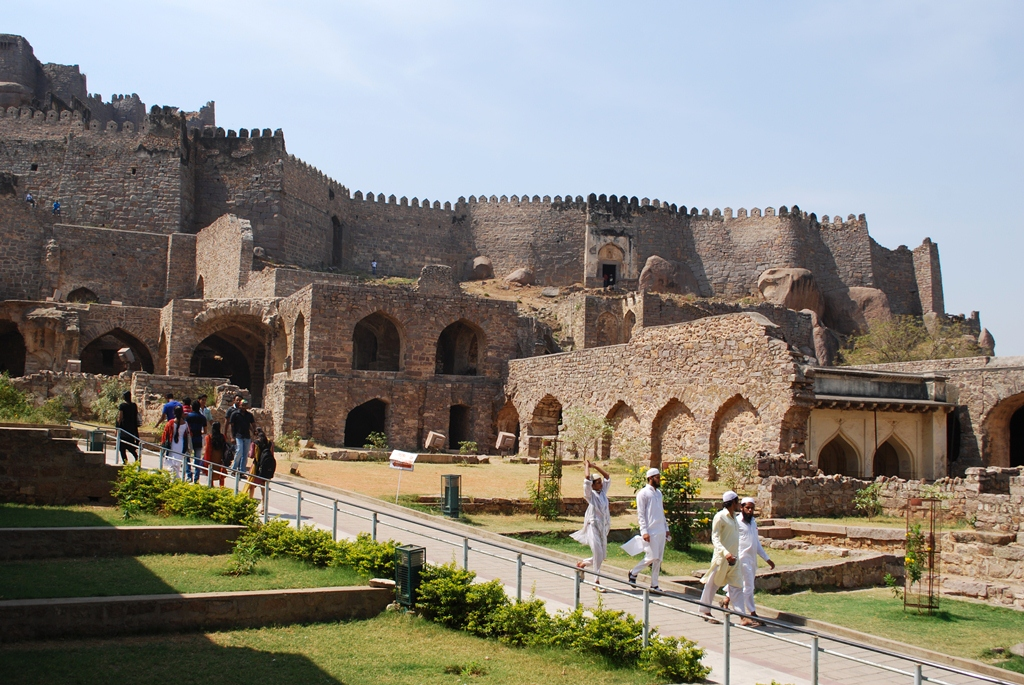
Golconda Fort, Hyderabad

Under the Mughals (1526-1858), Persian replaced Arabic almost throughout the region. The case is more or less the same in the southeastern and southernmost strip comprising the present Indian state of Tamil Nadu, which during a brief spell of Muslim authority there, in the mid-14th century, under the Madura sultanate, and then under the Qoṭbšāhī rulers and the Mughals in the 17th and 18th centuries, and the semi-independent nawwābs of Karnataka, saw extensive use of Persian. Likewise, in easternmost Bengal the epigraphic language was almost exclusively Arabic until the Mughal period, when it was totally replaced by Persian. In Orissa and Assam, which effectively came under Muslim authority in the 17th century, Persian was the language of epigraphs. In westernmost Gujarat, one encounters a curious phenomenon: both prose and verse epigraphs of the Delhi sultanate period (1296-1406), are generally in Persian, but later replaced by Arabic under the Gujarat sultans (1406-1580).The epigraphs of the 16th-17th century ʿĀdelšāhī (924-1097/1518-1686, q.v.) and Qoṭbšāhī (924-1098 /1518-1687) rulers of Bijapur and Golkonda-Hyderabad, respectively, who also had close relations with Persia, furnish better poetry. Surprisingly, in the above-mentioned small chiefdoms, as in parts of Tamil Nadu under the nawwābs of Karnataka, a considerable number of fairly high quality records is found.

== Second part of the new edition ==
Importance of the epigraphs, Calligraphic inscriptions constitute the most important decorative element in Indian Islamic Architecture which attained a high level of perfection in Qutb Minar at Delhi, Adina Mosque at Pandua (in Bengal), Atala Mosque at Jaunpur, Jami Mosques at Ahmedabad, Golconda and Hyderabad, Akbar’s tomb at Sikandra, Ibrahim Rauda at Bijapur and Taj Mahal at Agra.With the help of these epigraphs, we can prepare a list of calligraphers, region-wise and period-wise, whose beautiful calligraphy adorns so many buildings in the width and breadth of the country. Scripts employed in the Perso-Arabic epigraphs include Kufi, Naskh, Thulth and Nastaliq. The second part contains details of Persian epigraphy on Bengal stones.

== Third part ==
The third part deals with the Mughal/Persian architecture in India. The influence Persian-style architecture and language in India began with the Tughlaq dynasty; in addition, all the ruling dynasties after them were originally from Greater Khorasan, an area dominated by Persian language and culture. The Mughal dynasty also came from Greater Khorasan, which is why the book describes Mughal architecture as the Khorasanid or Persian style of architecture.

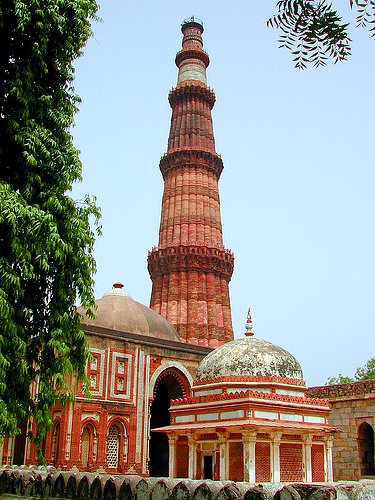
Qutub Minar, a prominent example of Islamic architecture in India.

Mughal tombs, made from sandstone and marble, emphasise the Persian influence. Among the architectural achievements of this era are the Red Fort at Agra (1565–74) and the walled city of Fatehpur Sikri (1569–74), as well as the Taj Mahal, which was built as a tomb for Queen Mumtaz Mahal by Shah Jahan (1628–58). With its double dome, its recessed archway, its white marble and its parks, as well as the emphasis on symmetry and detail, this building contains many of the key elements of architecture from the period of Shah Jahan. Verses from the Quran were inscribed on the walls of the buildings; problematically, though the depiction of living beings (which was an essential part of the pre-Islamic artistic tradition of India) is forbidden by the Islamic religion.

== Fourth part ==
The fourth part describes the Persian language and its influence over other languages such as Hindi, Urdu and Turkic. During the last four decades over 10,000 inscriptions have been copied from different parts of the India and duly accessioned, deciphered and listed in the Annual Reports on Indian Epigraphy (ARE) since 1952-53 onwards, under a separate Appendix with an exhaustive introduction. Among the Indian states, Uttar Pradesh has yielded the largest number of Perso-Arabic epigraphs (i.e. 2,175), constituting 21.4% of the aggregate, number-wise followed by Maharashtra (over 14%), Gujarat (over 9%), Andhra Pradesh and Madhya Pradesh (about 9%), Rajasthan (about 8%), Kamataka (7%), West Bengal (4%), Bihar, and Jammu & Kashmir (about 4% each), Tamil Nadu (2.55%), Haryana (2%), Delhi (about 2%). About 2,000 Perso-Arabic inscriptions have been published so far in Epigraphia Indo-Moslemica (ElM) and Epigraphia Indica-Arabic and Persian Supplement (EIAPS) from 1907–08 to 1977.[]

== Fifth part ==
The fifth part contains some samples of royal orders, including government instructions, and copies of the Persian drawings found in the museums of Hyderabad and Delhi. we also come across epigraphical texts composed by rulers like Adil Shahi king Ali II (1656–71), Mughal king BahadurShah II (1837–57) and Nawwab of Awadh Wajid Ali Shah (1848–56). A vast majority of these poets mentioned in epigraphs are unknown from available sources. those of the Sultanate period, covering approximately 12th to 15th centuries (7th -9th cent. H.) are particularly valuable. The places, to quote a few, where this phenomenon occurred are : Cambay in the 12th to 14th centuries, Karad (Maharashtra) in the 16th century, Hyderabad in the 17th century, Lucknow, Allahabad, Kashmir etc. in the subsequent period.

== Indian monuments with Persian inscriptions ==
According to the book Persian Inscriptions on Indian Monuments, there are nearly 15,000 examples of Persian and Quranic inscriptions in India, mostly found in cities such as Hyderabad, Delhi, Agra and Lucknow, amongst others. The list of historical Indian monuments containing Persian inscriptions and Persian calligraphy includes the following:

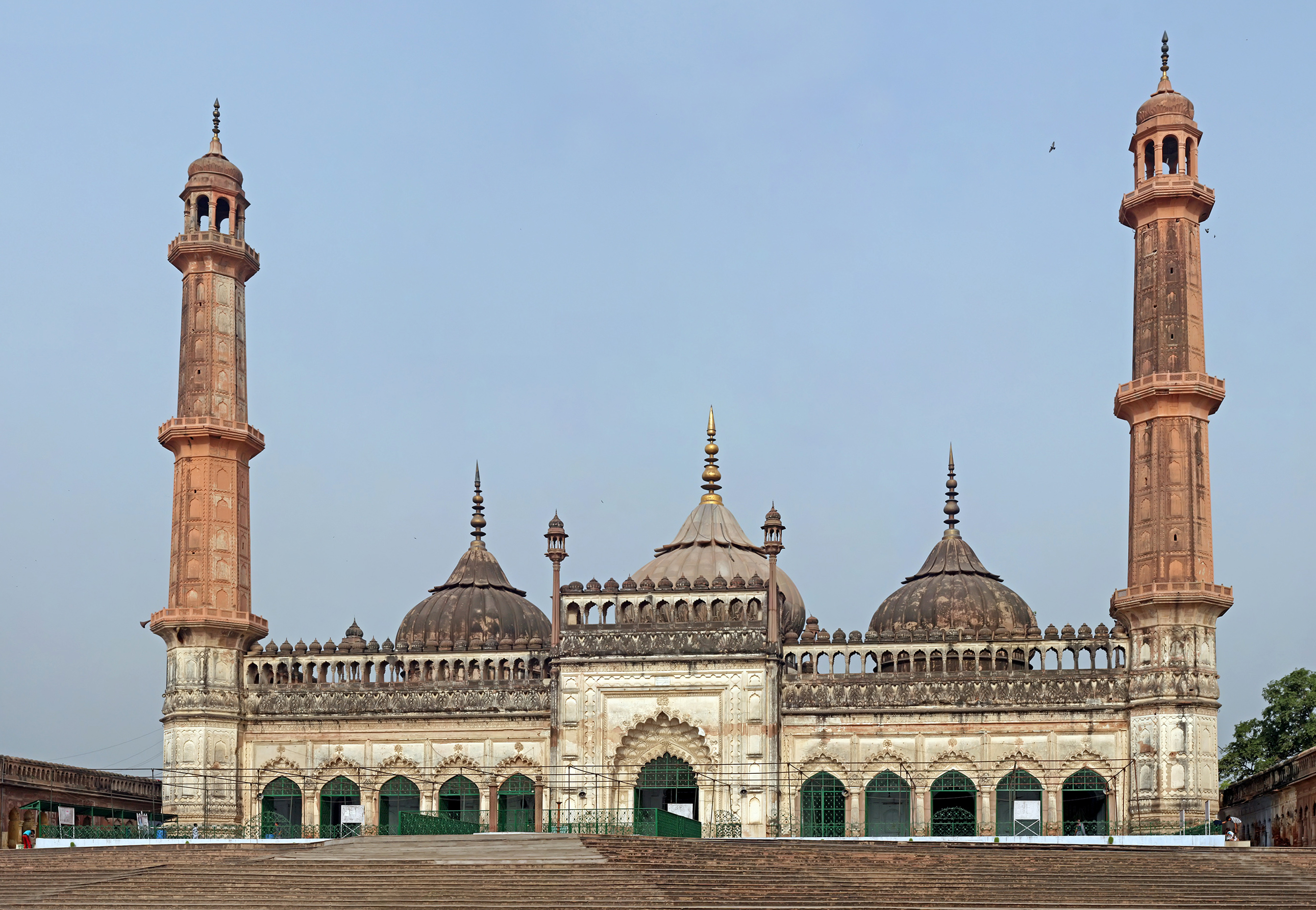
Asfi Mosque, Bara Imambara, Lucknow

- The Qutub Minar
- The Red Fort
- Humayun's Tomb
- Akbar's tomb
- Rashtrapati Bhavan
- The Lodi Gardens
- Purana Quila
- Safdarjung's Tomb
- Qutb complex
- Mehrauli in South Delhi.

Mehrauli was built by Qutub-ud-din Aibak and heralded the beginning of a new style of art and architecture which came to be known as the Indo-Islamic style. Other monuments included in the Qutub complex are the Jamali Kamali Mosque and Tomb, Balban's tomb, Quli Khan's Tomb, Rajon Ki Baoli in Mehrauli Archaeological Park. In addition, Jahaz Mahal and Adham Khan's Tomb are located on a hilltop nearby.

Other monuments with Persian inscriptions include the following:

- Tughlaqabad
- Bedil Dehlavi
- Amir Khusrow Dehlavi
- Lucknow
- St. James' Church
- Bara Imambara
- Buland Darwaza
- Lahore Fort
- Taj Mahal
- Bibi Ka Maqbara
- Fatehpur Sikri
- Moinuddin Chishti
- Badshahi Masjid
- Ataga Khan

== Gallery ==
Pictures of some of the Indian monuments which contain Persian inscriptions and have been explained in the book.

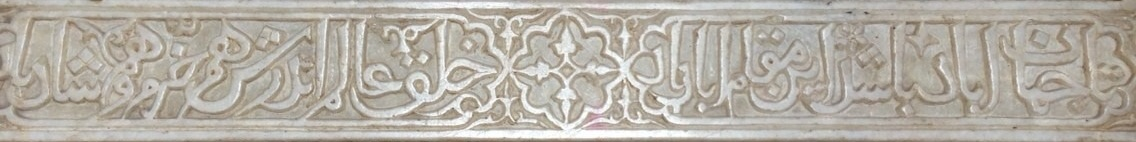
Persian inscriptions on Indian monuments

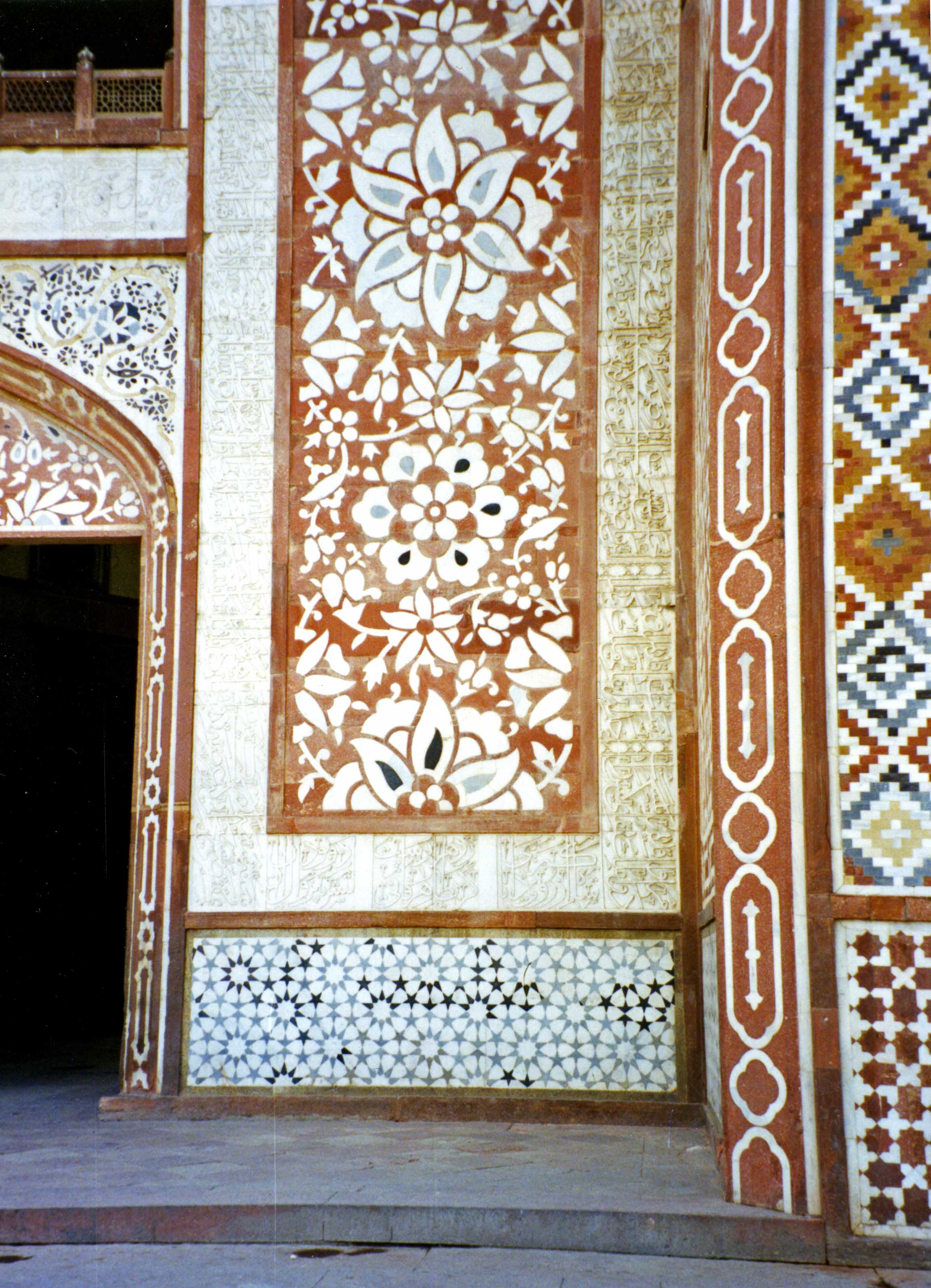
Akbar's tomb inscribed with Persian

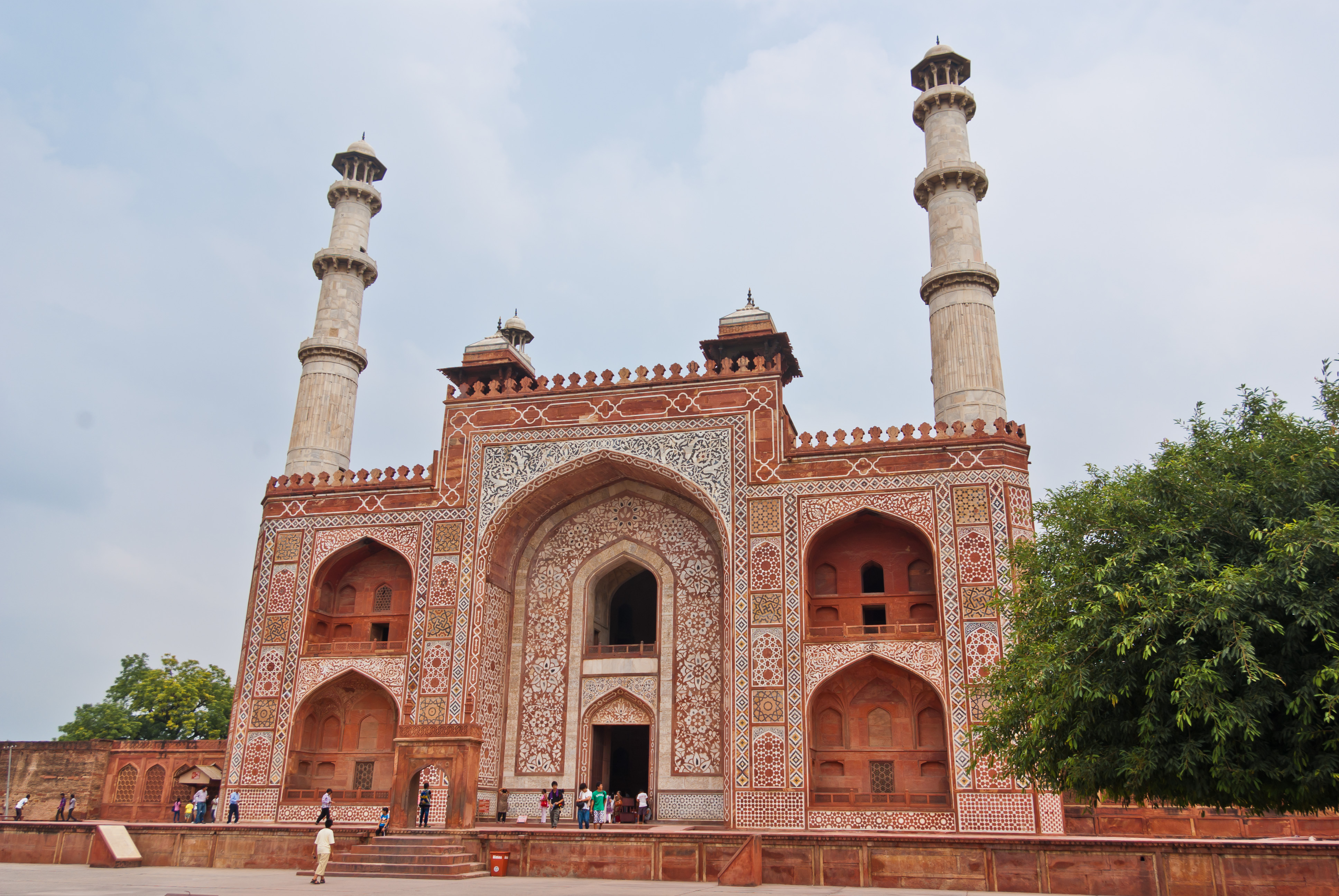
Akbar's tomb at Agra.

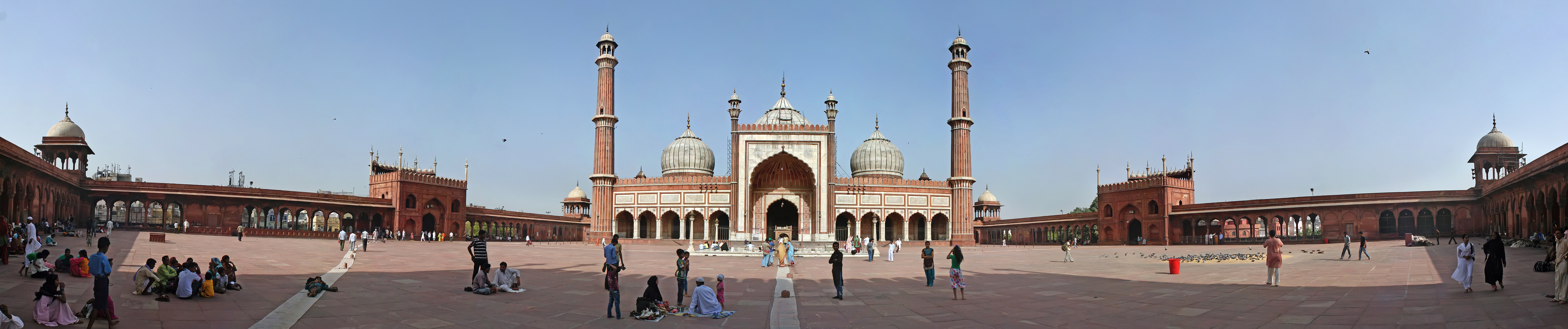
Jamamasjid

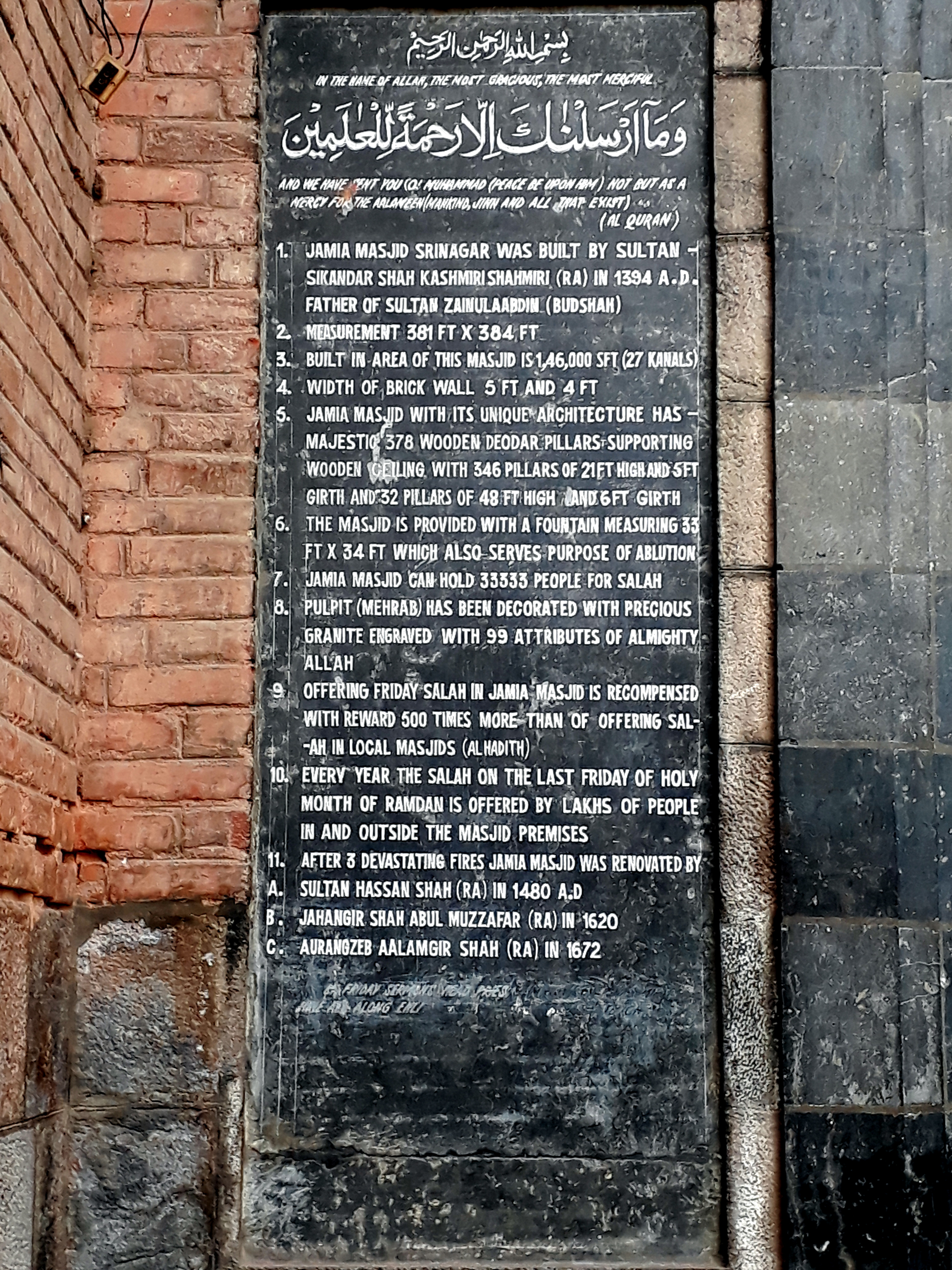
Plaque of Jamia Masjid another plaque is the order of the shahjahan in Persian

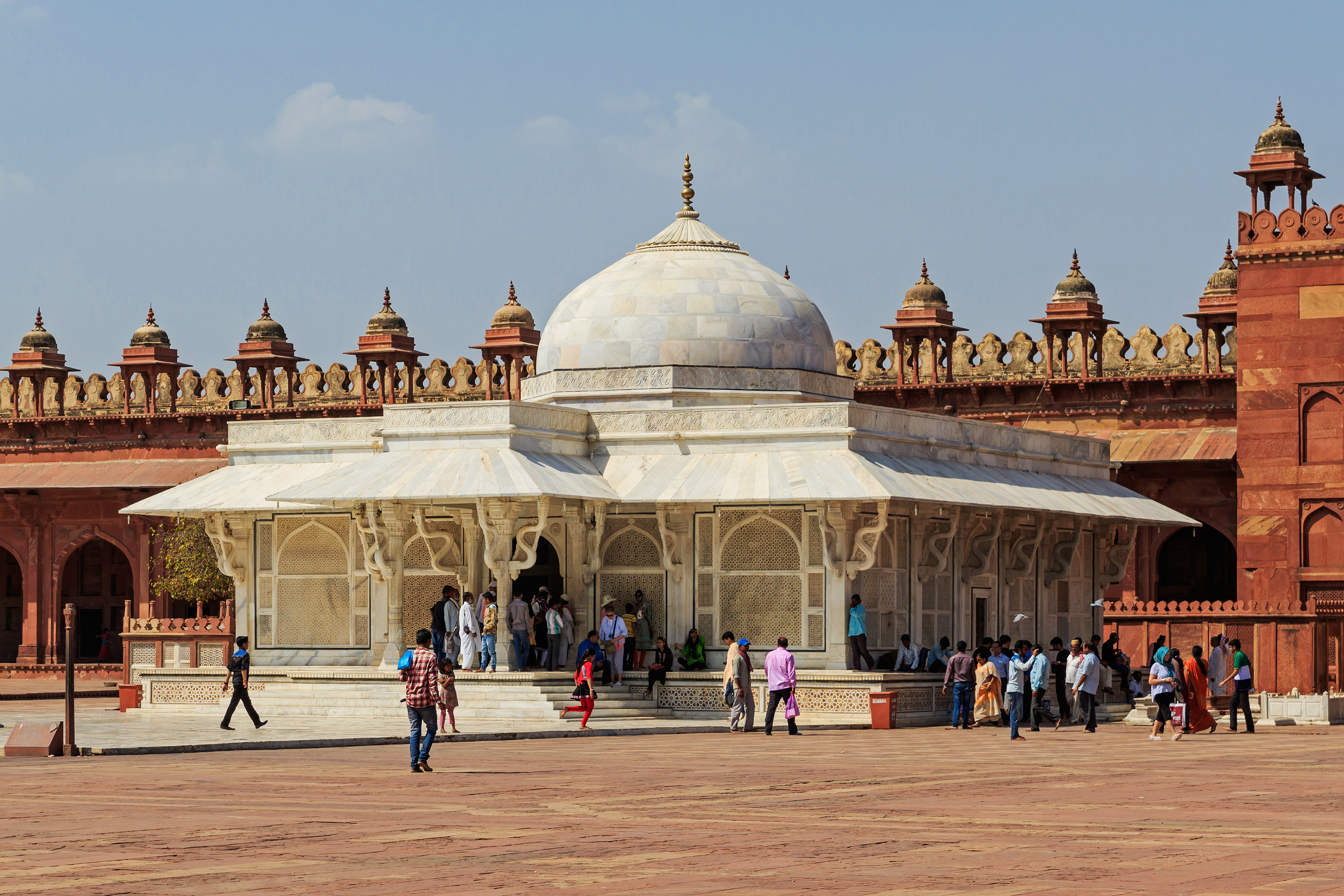
The tomb of Shaikh Salim Chisti finest examples of Mughal architecture

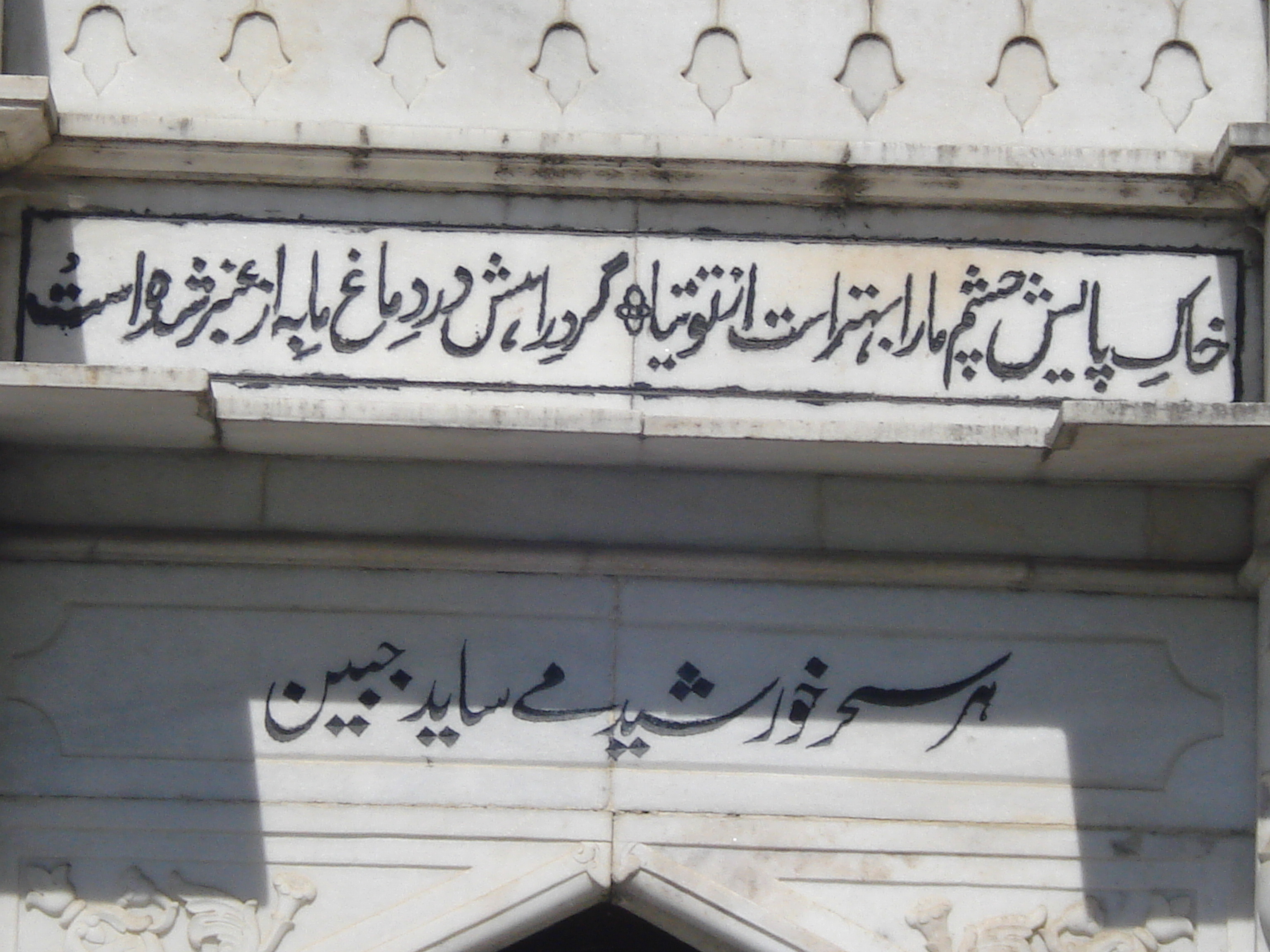
. Hazratbal Shrine kashmir srinagar

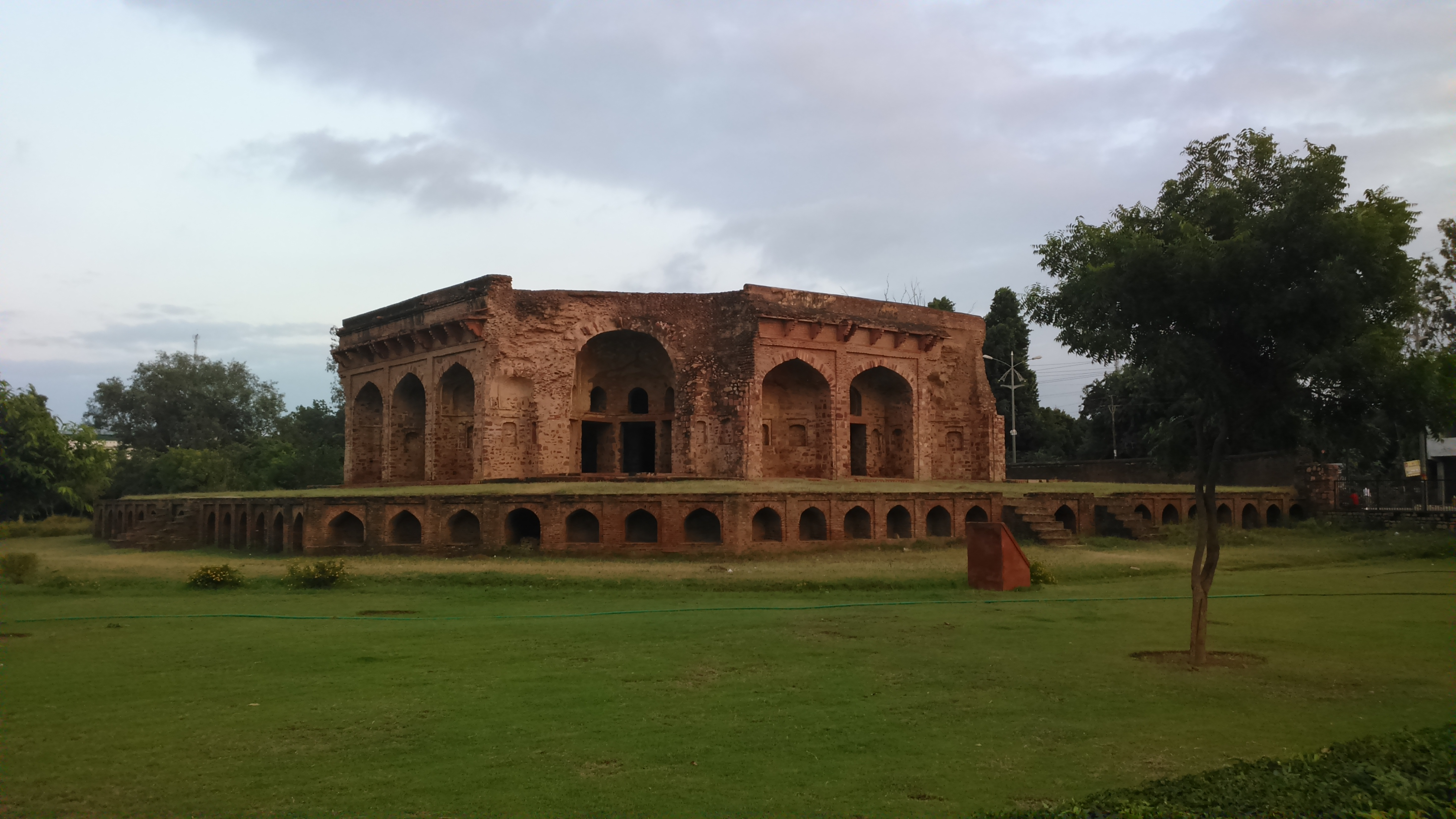
An unknown Lodi tomb in Akbar's Tomb complex

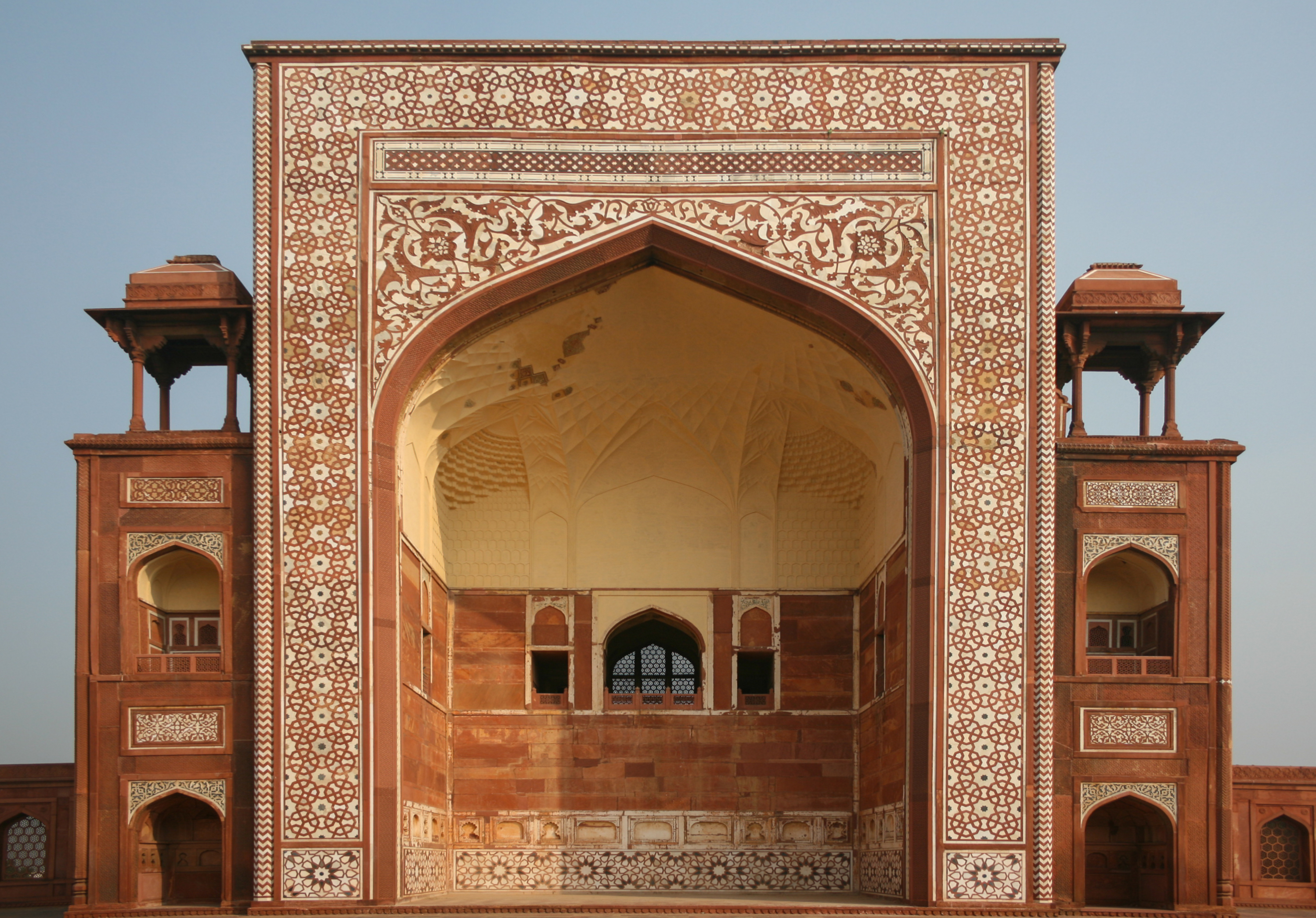
Barrel vault

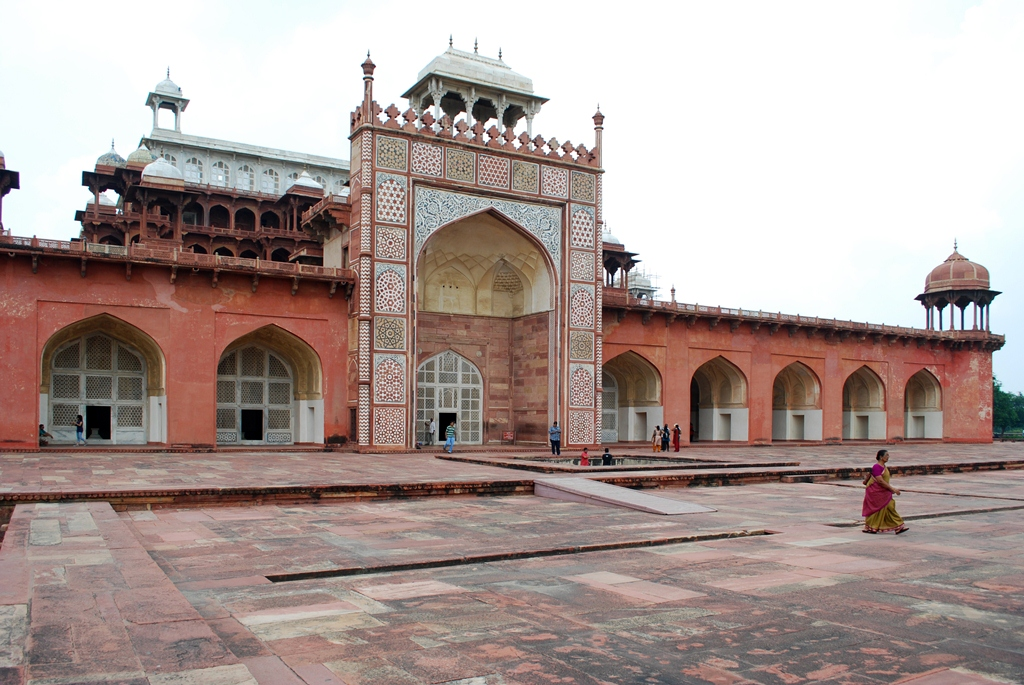
Front Façade

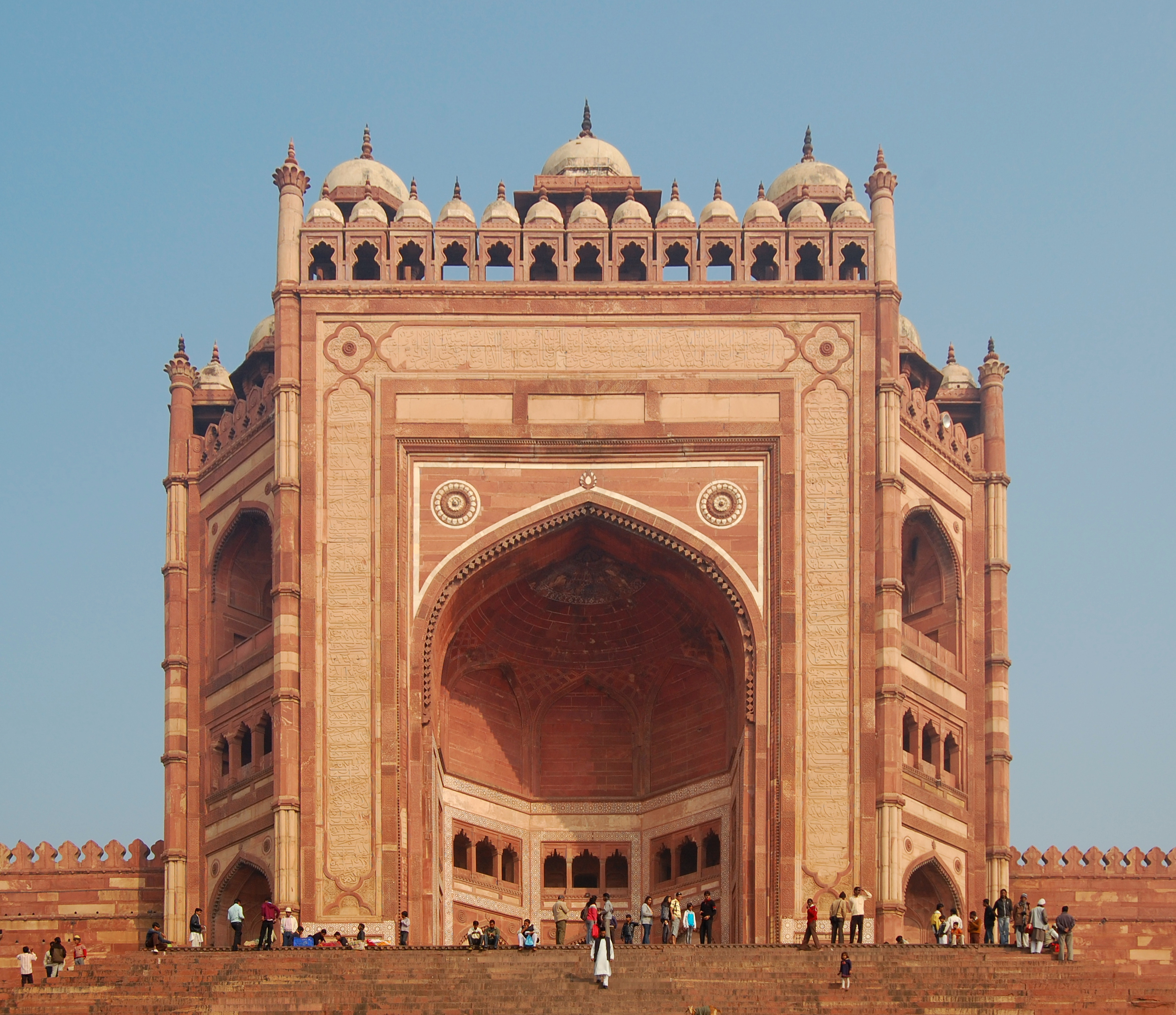
Fatehpur Sikiri Buland Darwaza gate

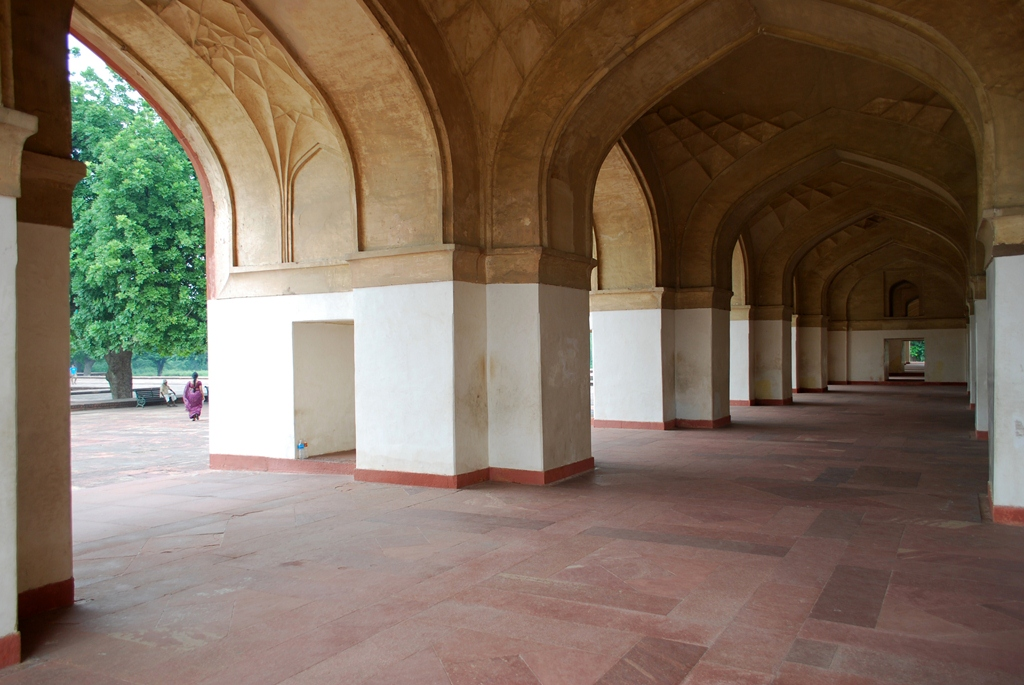
Circumferential Gallery around the cenotaph

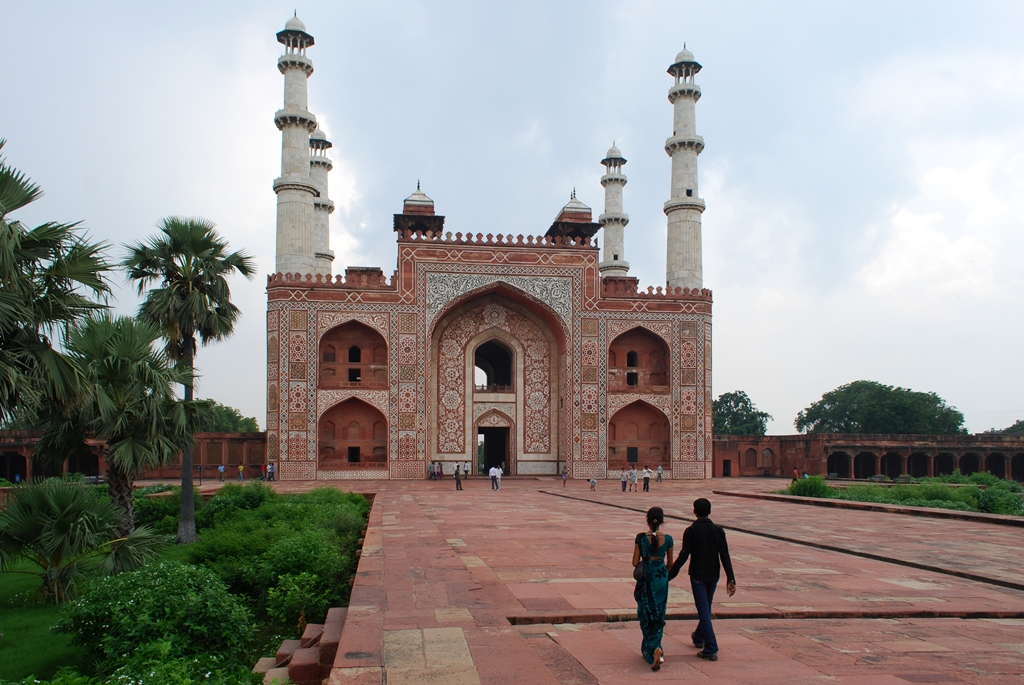
View of South Gate from Interior

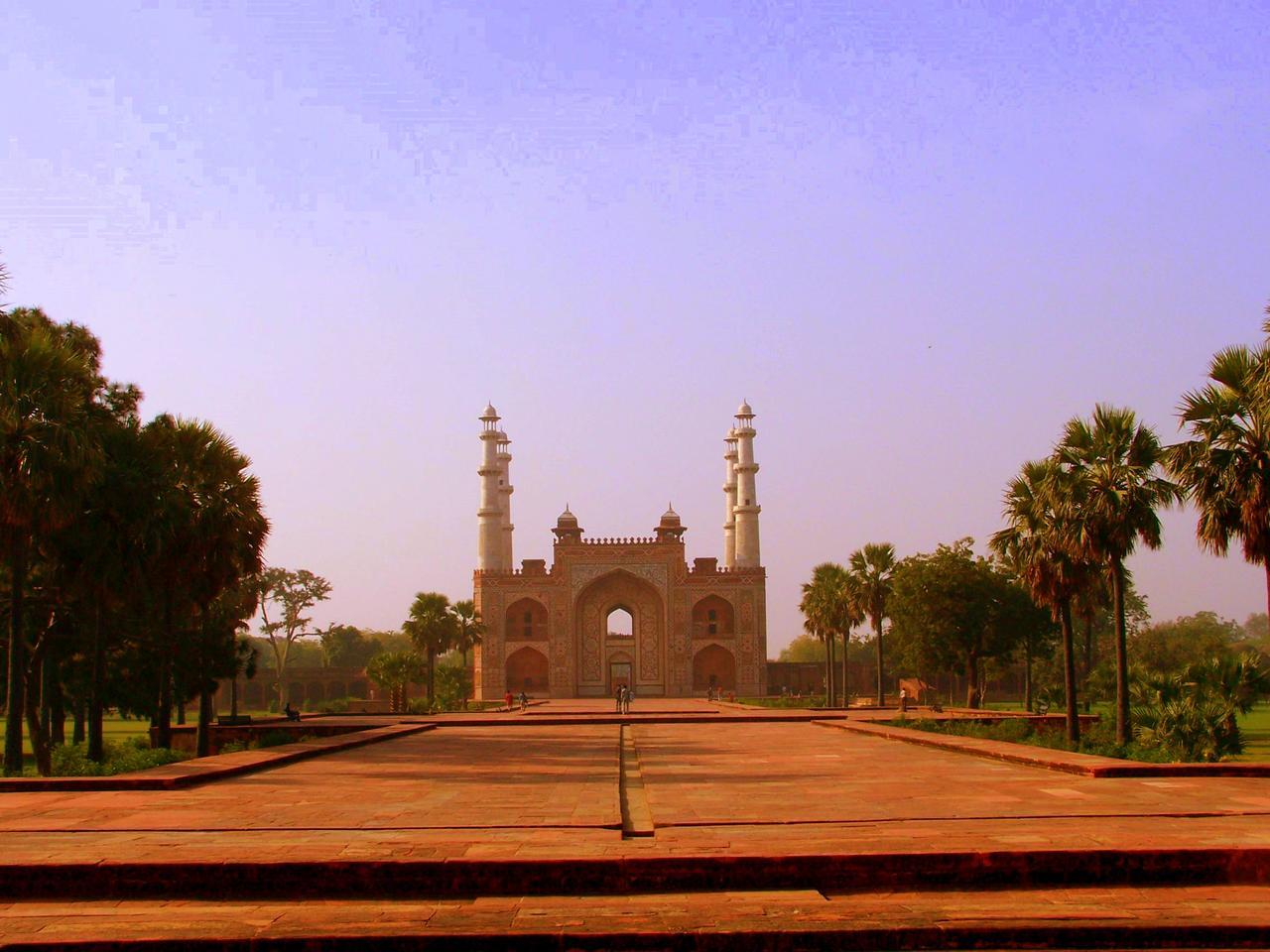
Akbar's Tomb.

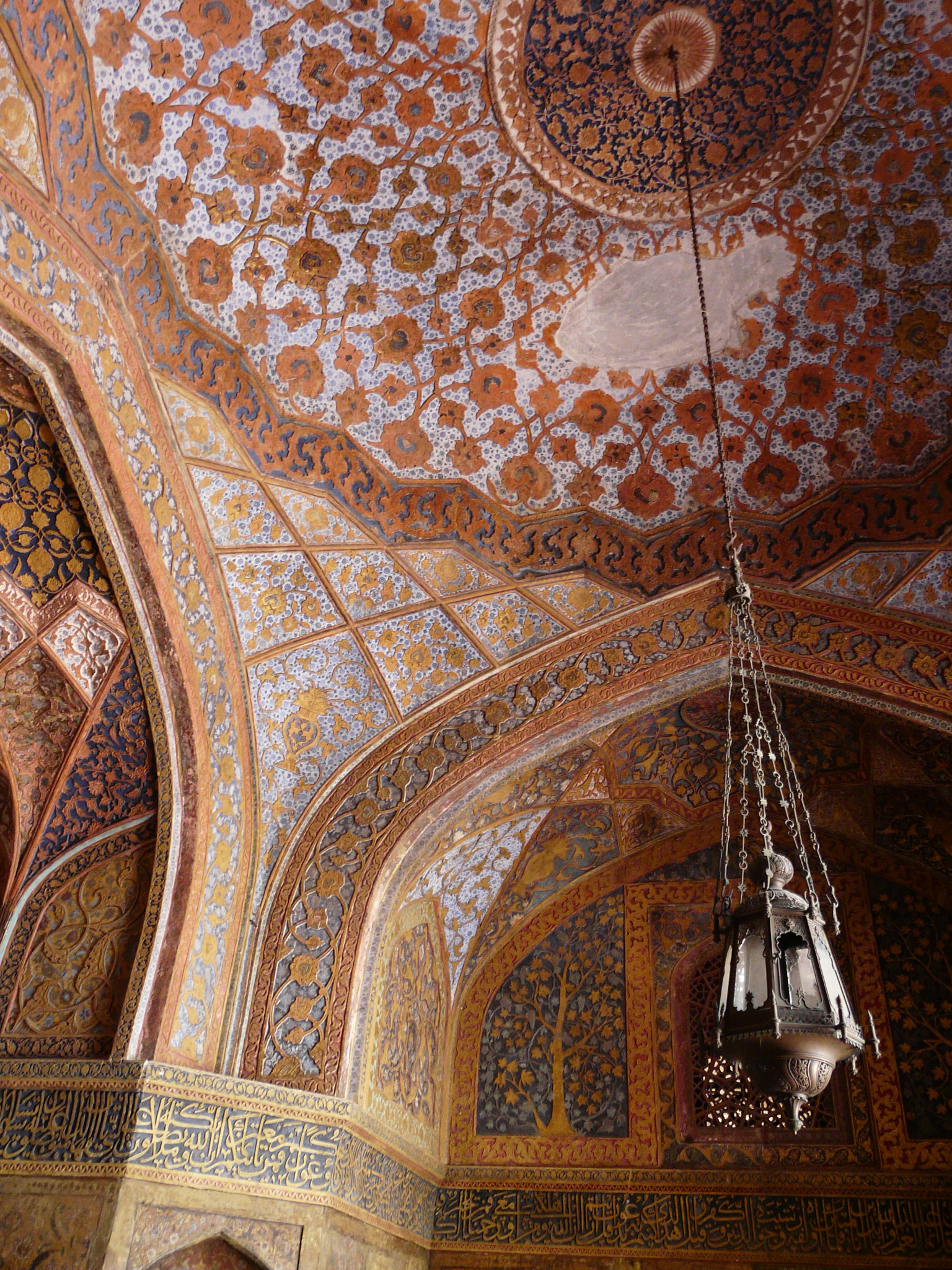
Tomb of Akbar, Sikandra

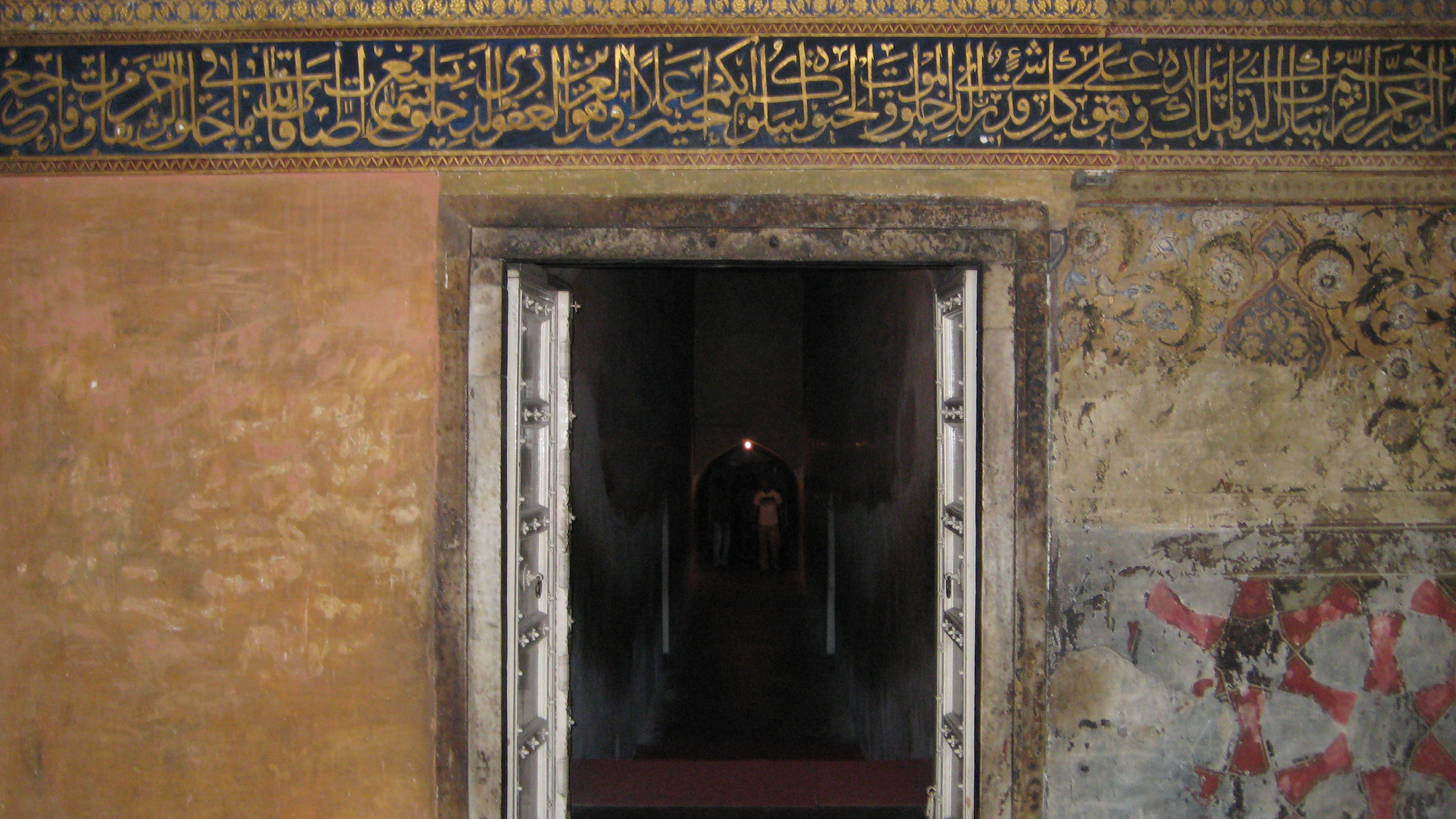
Calligraphy

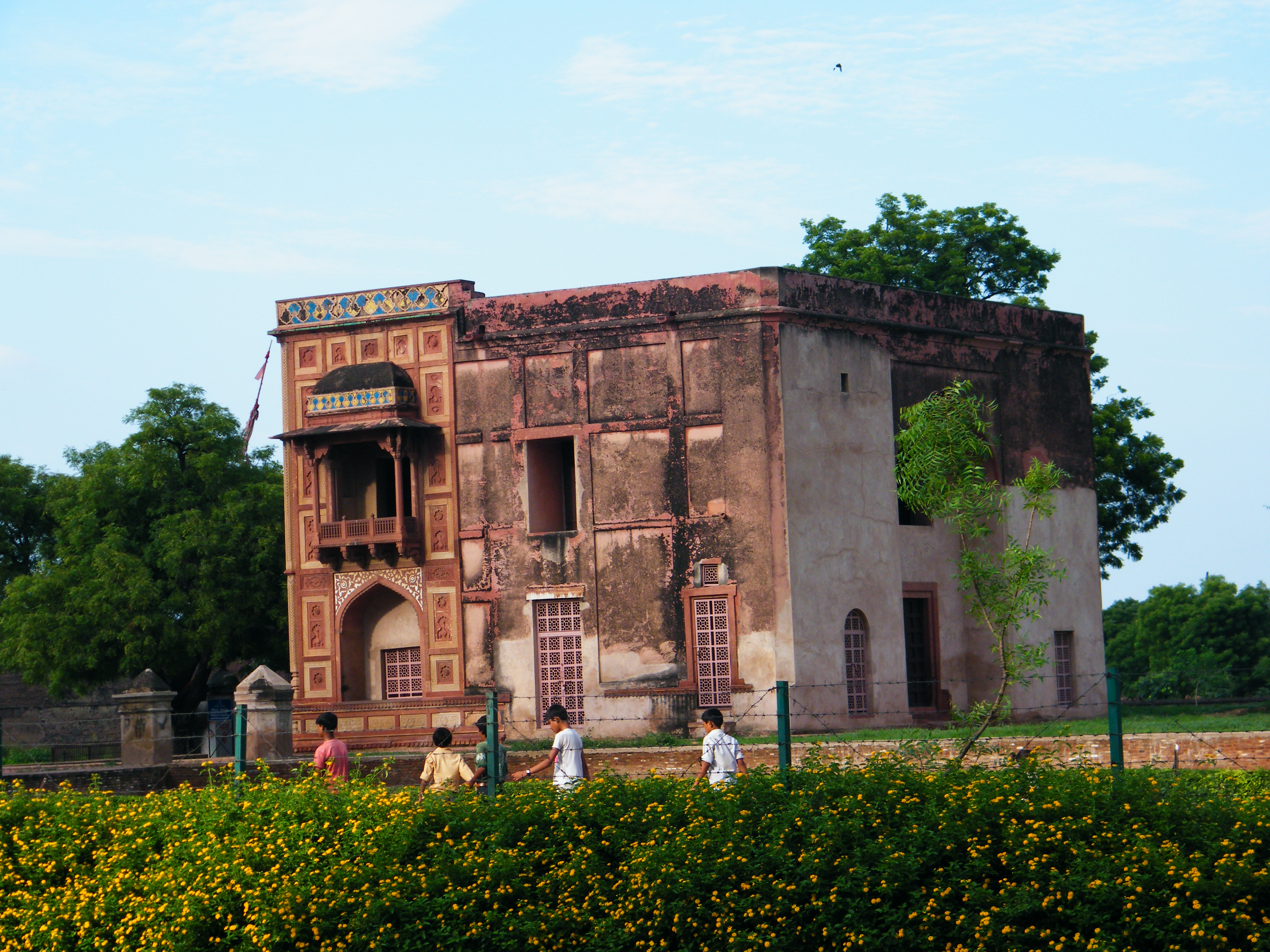
Kanch Mahal, built by Jehangir.

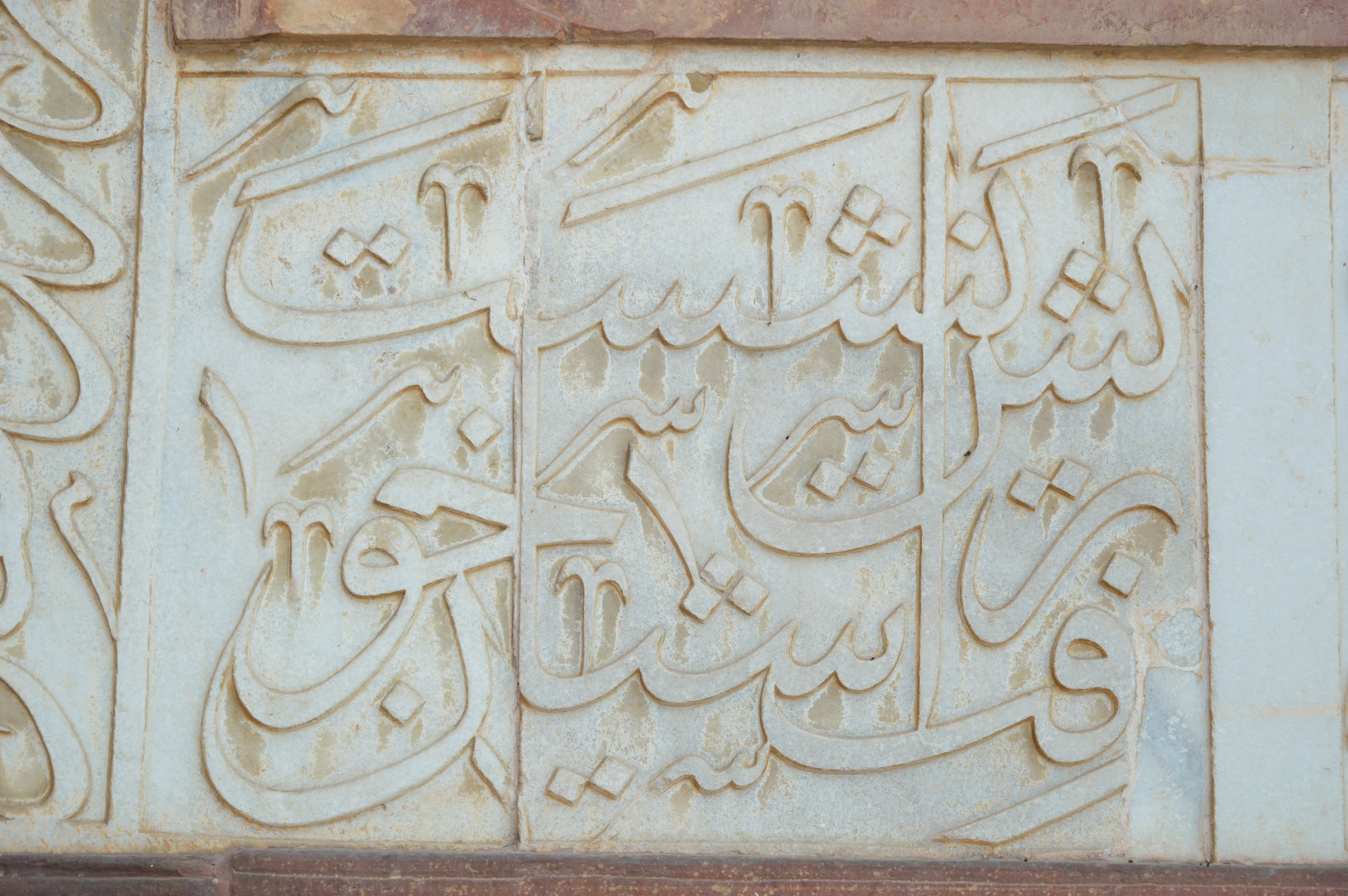
Calligraphy.Sikandra

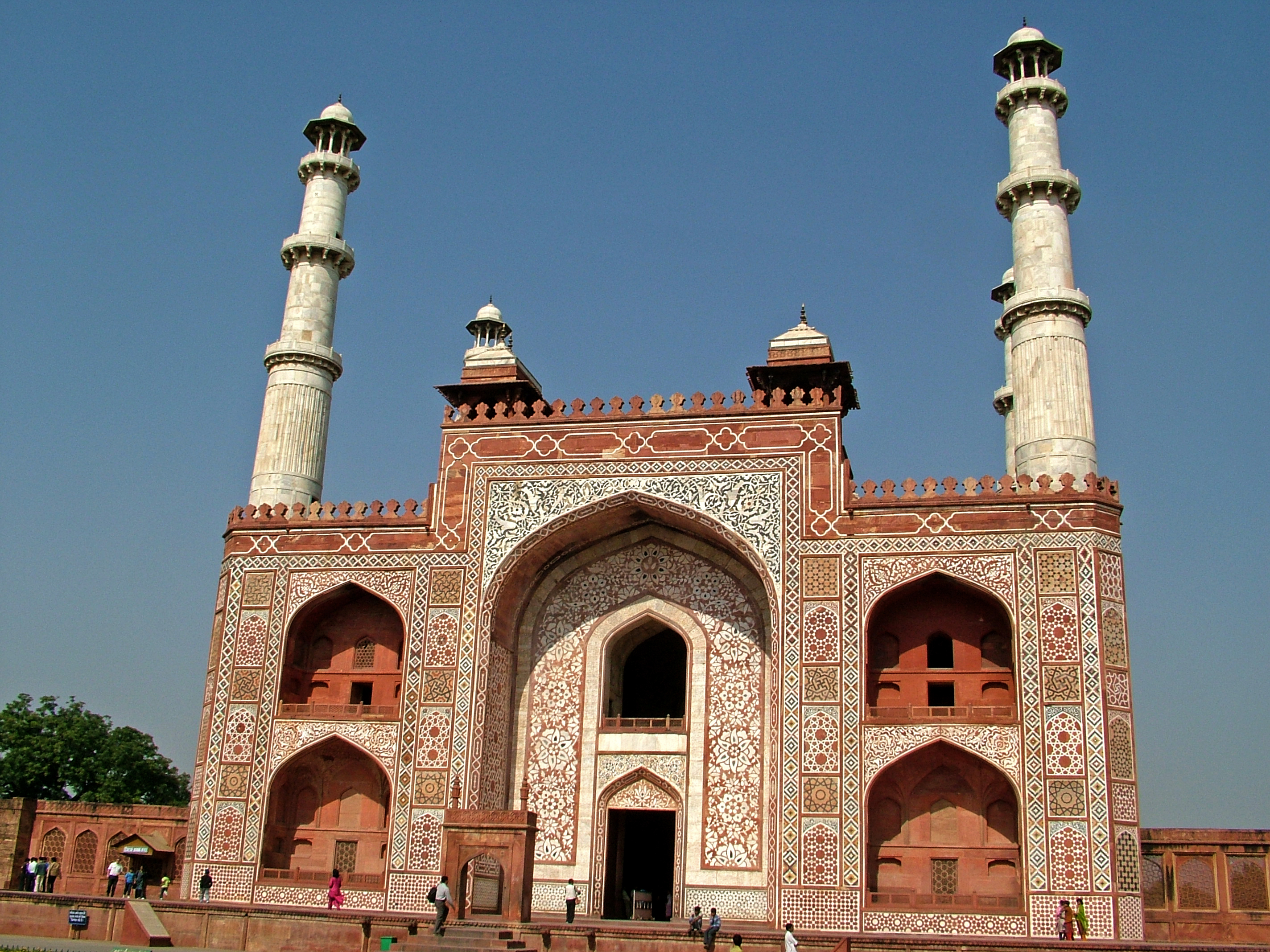
The Tomb of Akbar the Great

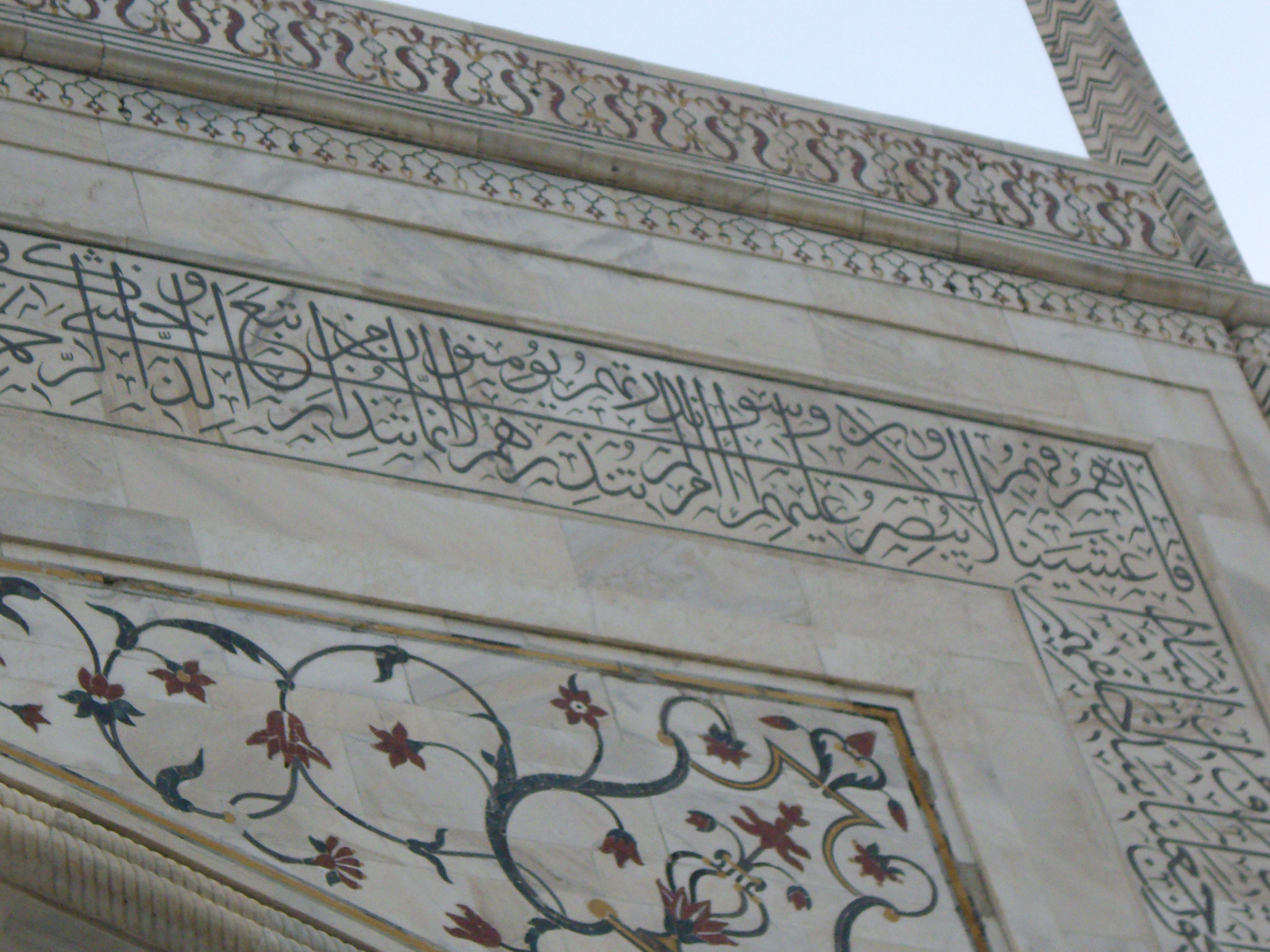
Taj mahal Quran verses in Persian calligraphy Sols style

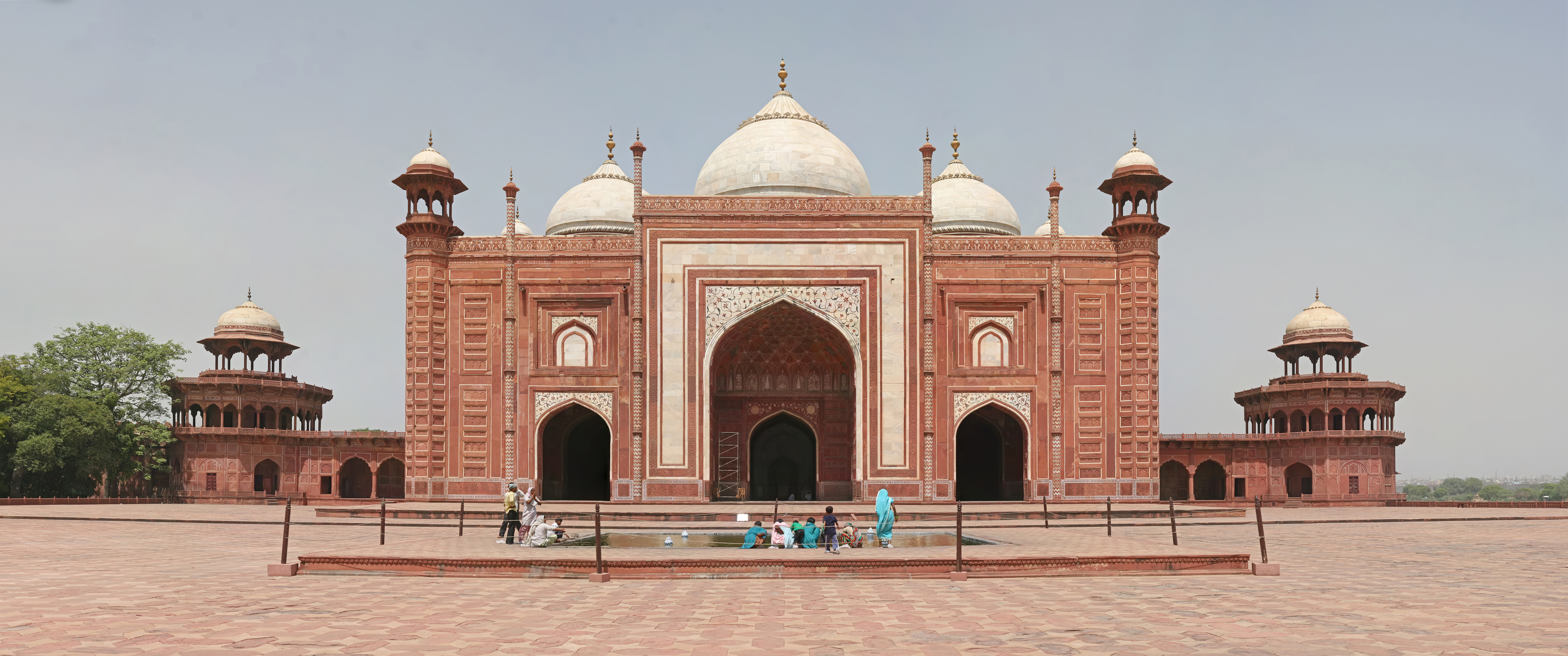
Taj Mahal Mosque, Agra

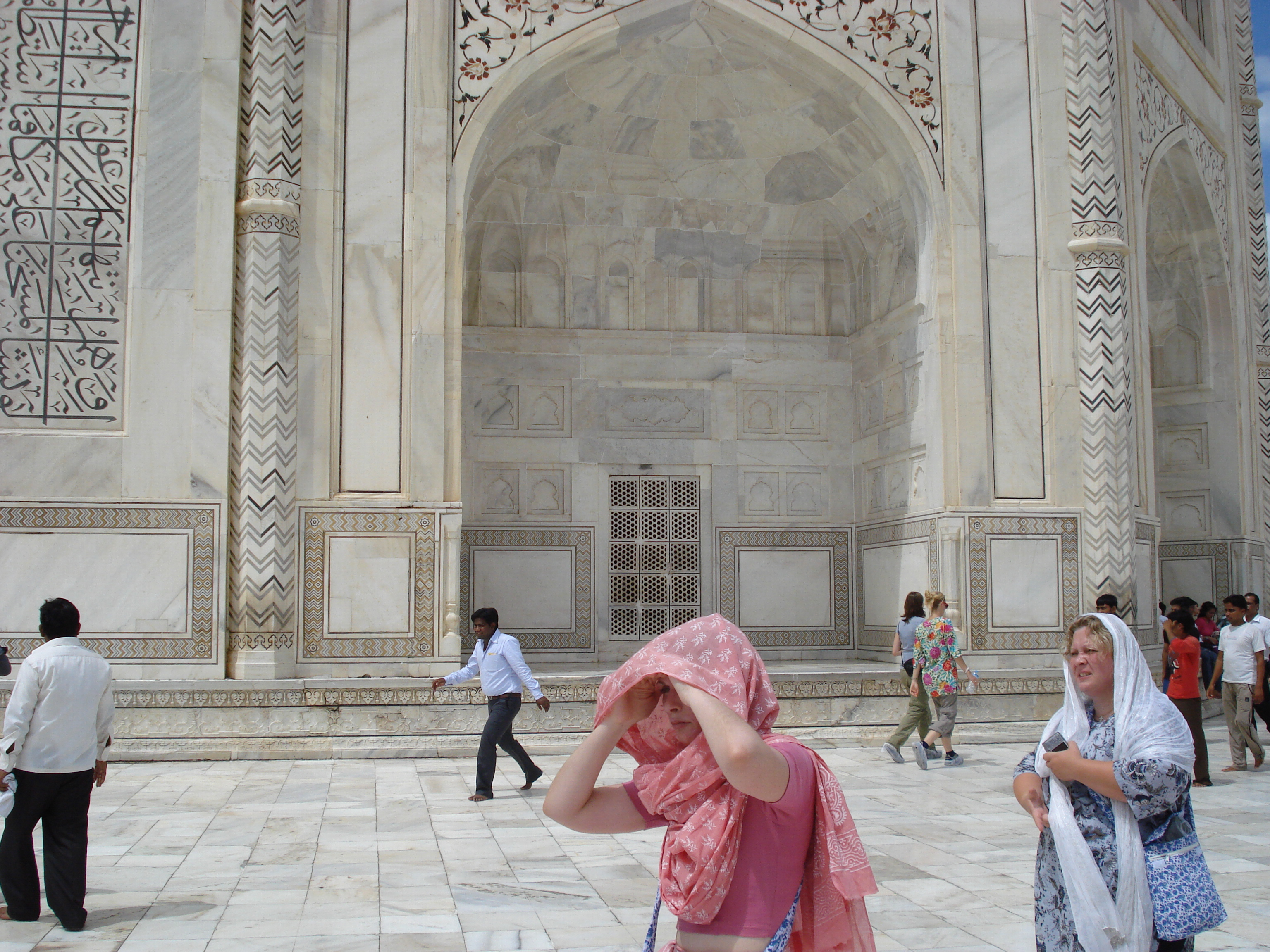
The Quran inscribed on the Taj Mahal with Persian style Calligraphy.

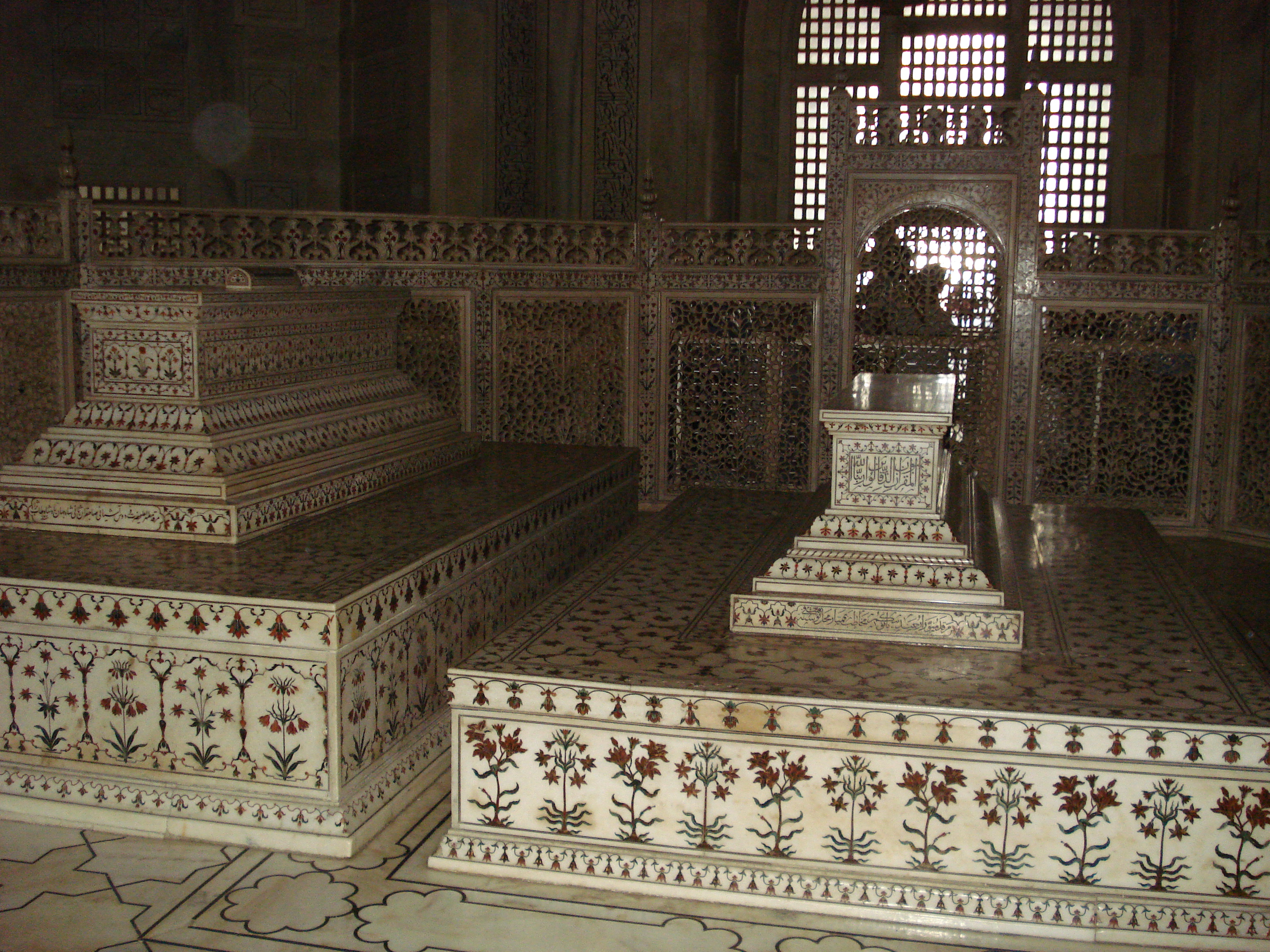
Arjomand Banou

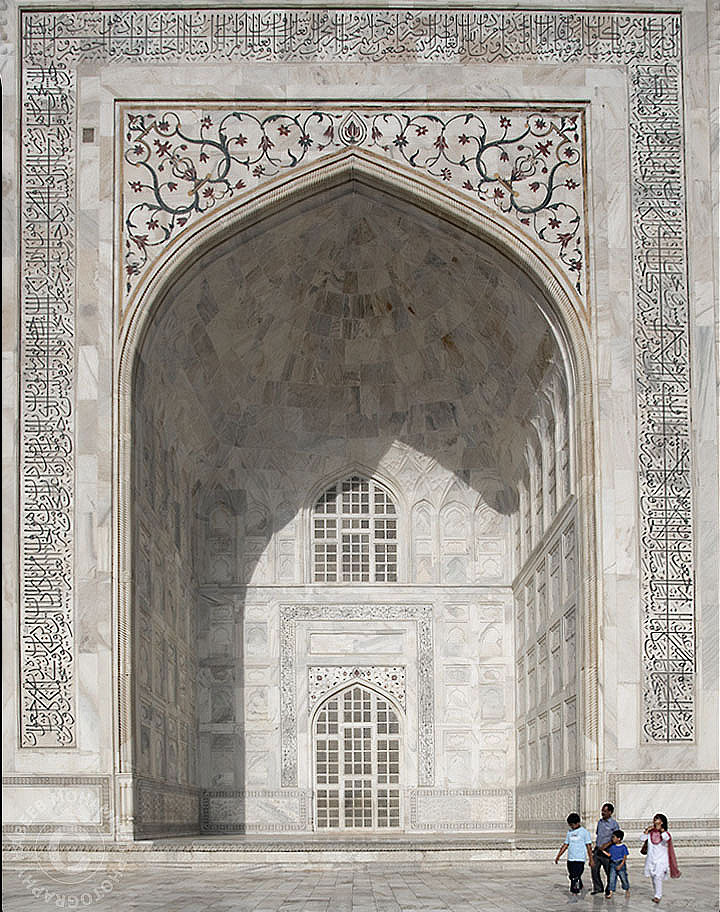
Facade of Taj Mahal Quranic verses with Persian

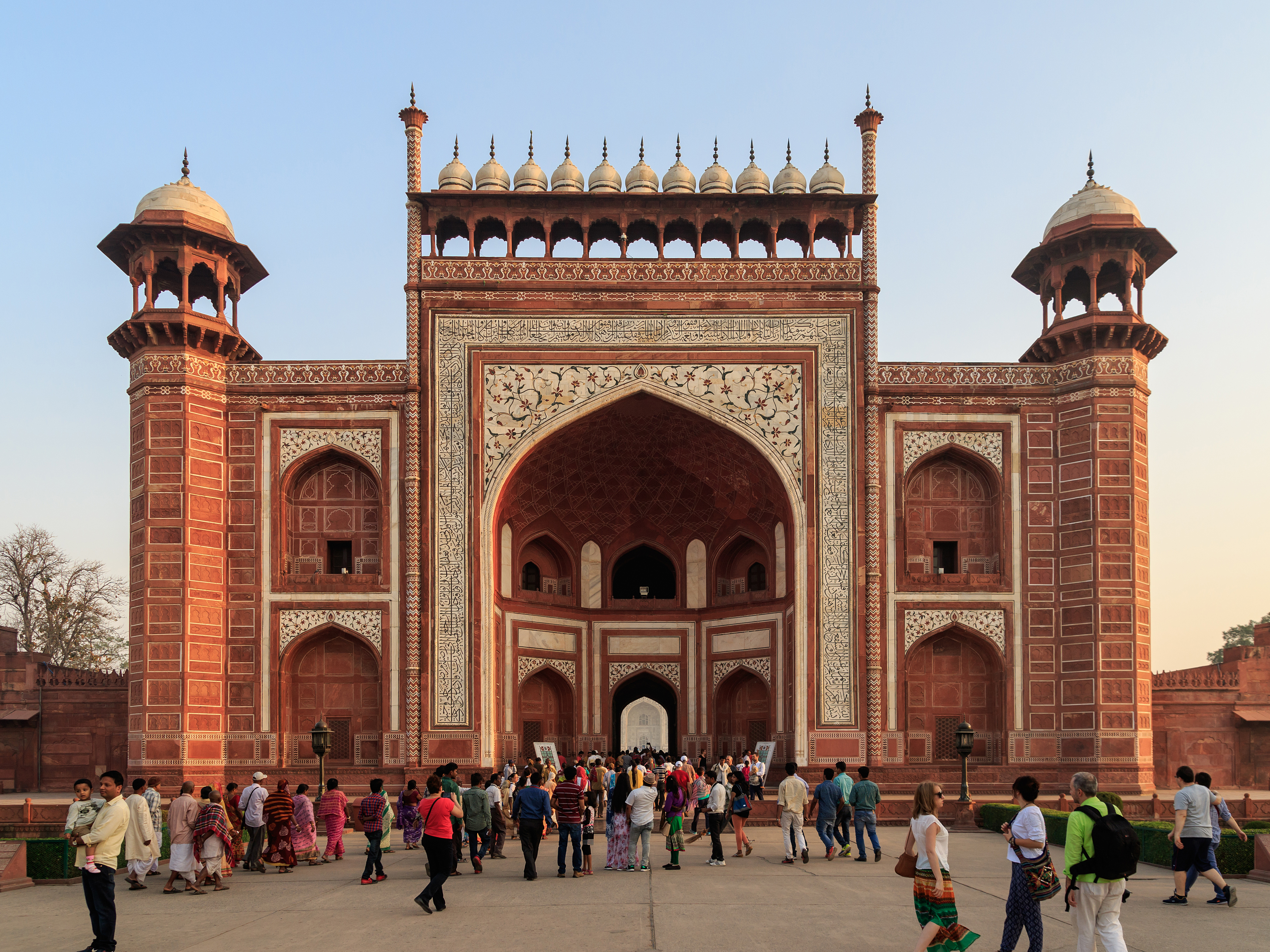
Agra darvaze Taj Mahal Quranic verses with Persian calligraphy style

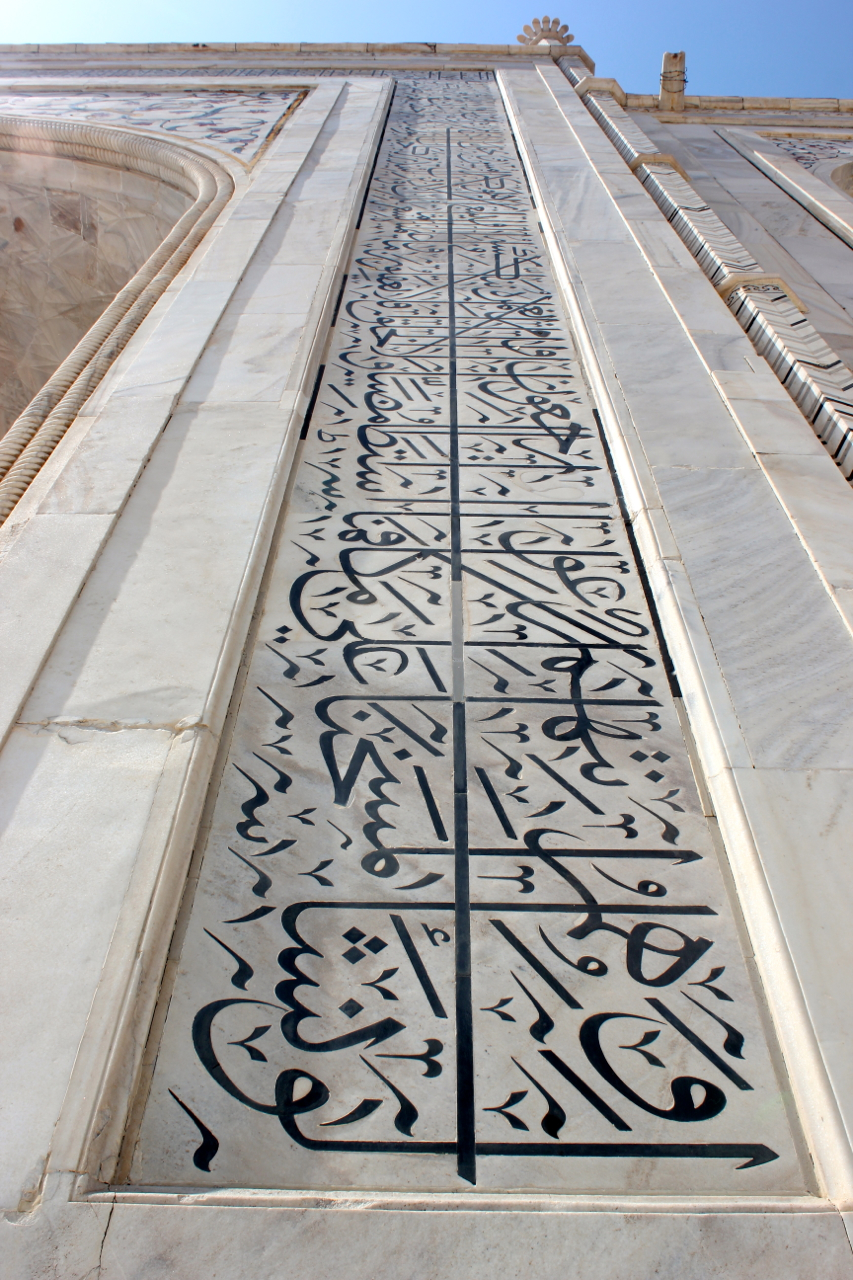
Taj mahal Quranic verses in Persian calligraphy Sols style

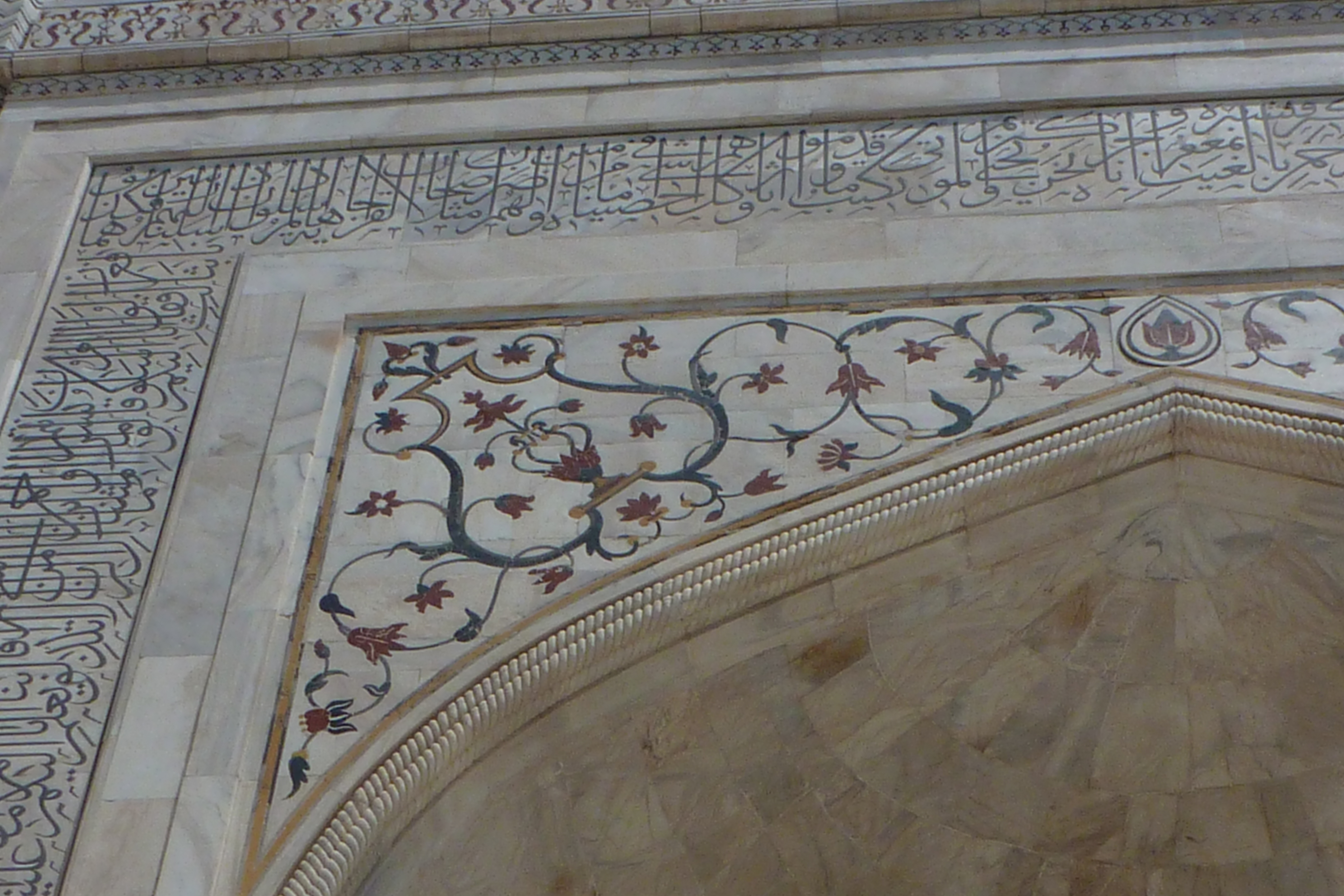
Quranic verses in Persian calligraphy style

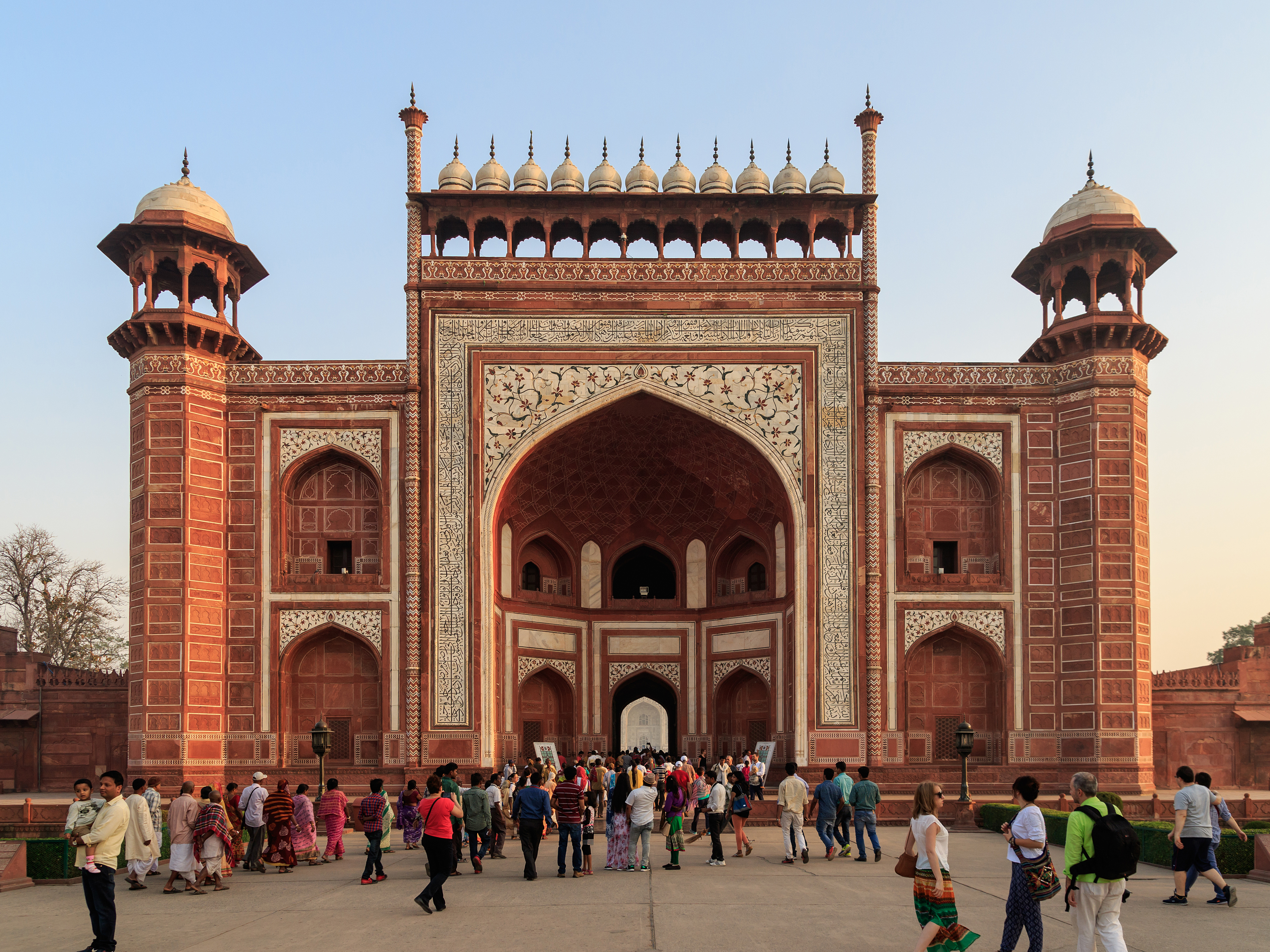
Taj Mahal.

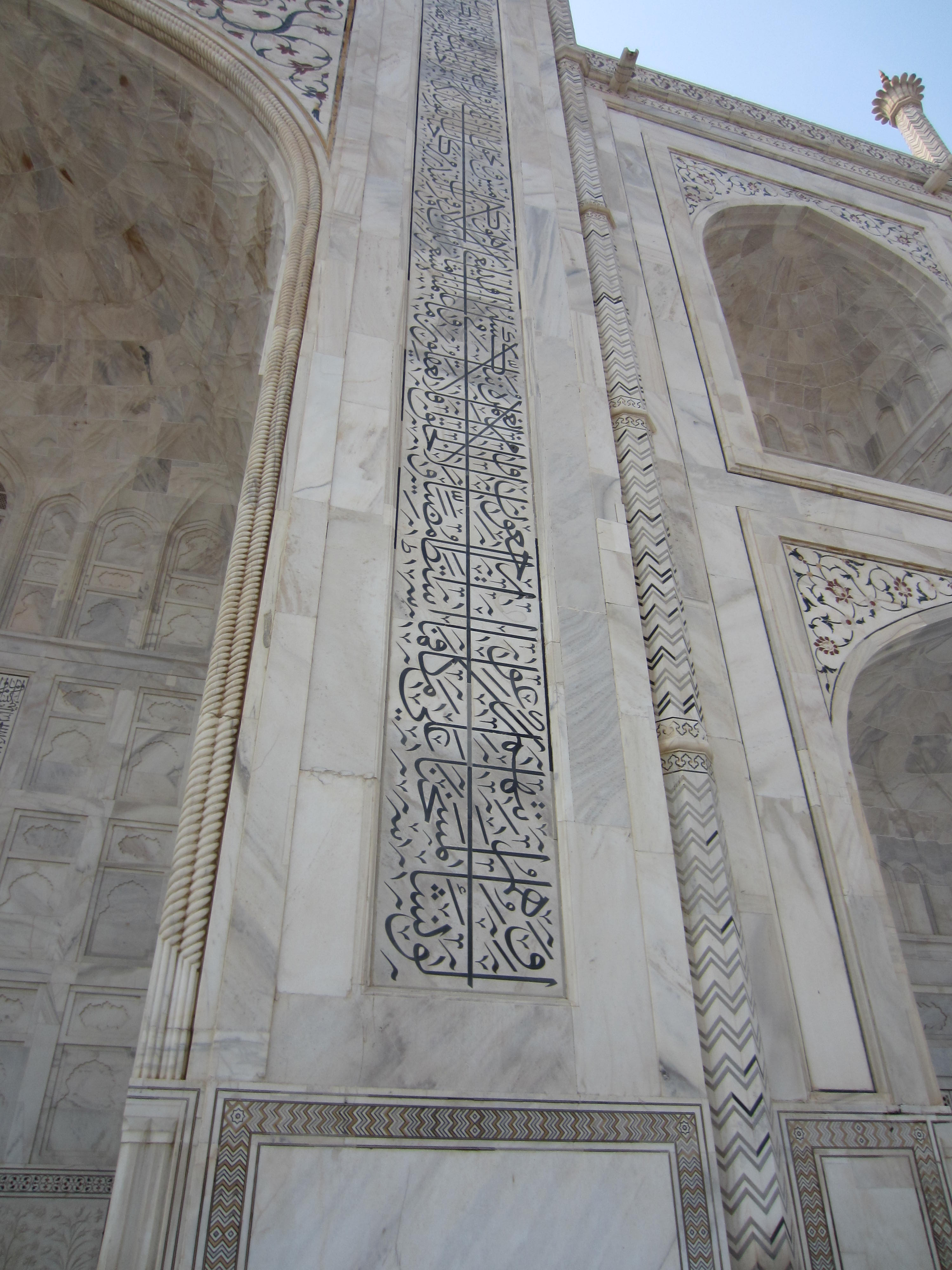
Taj Mahal Quranic verses in Persian calligraphy Sols

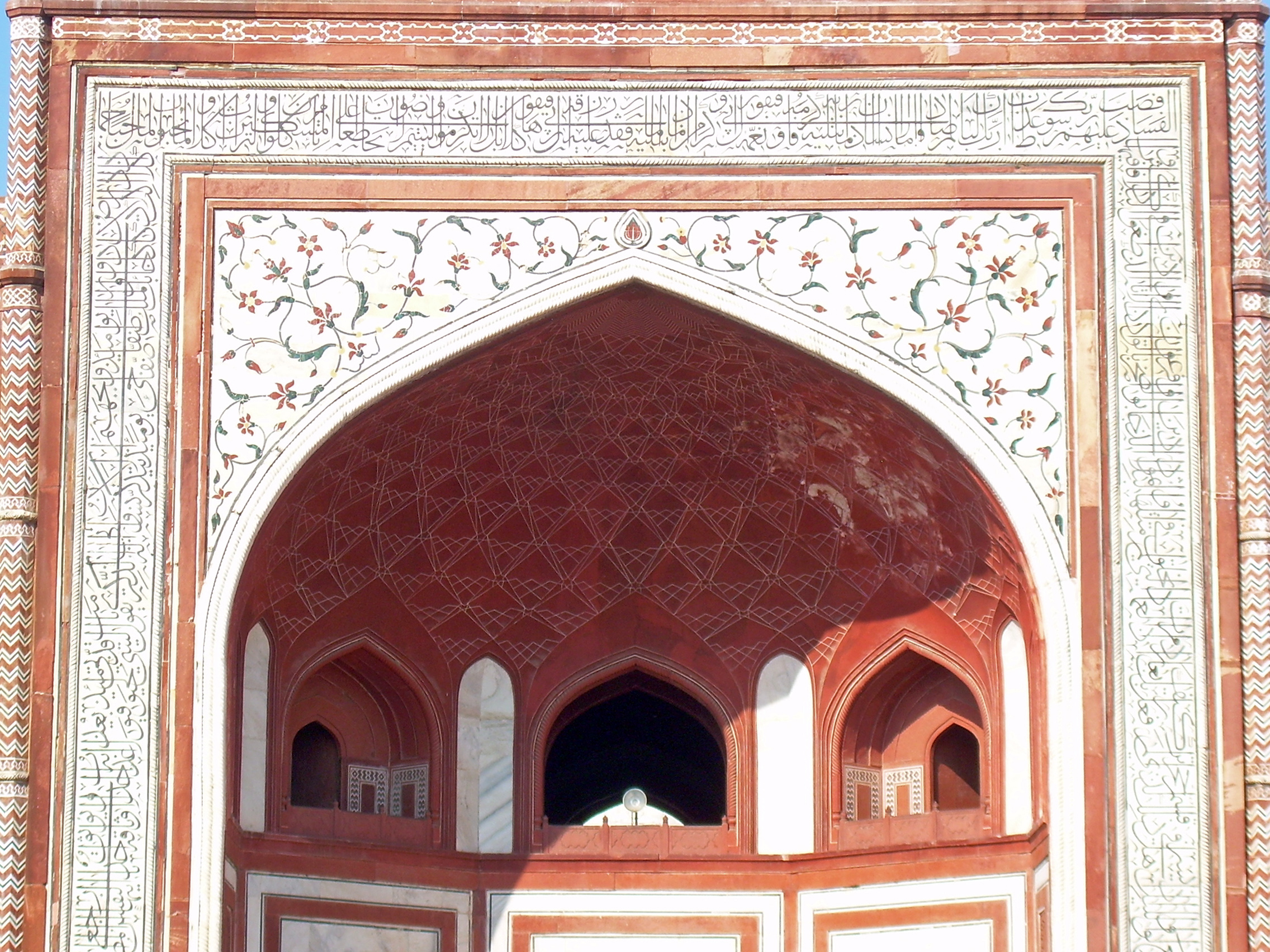
Taj gateway building

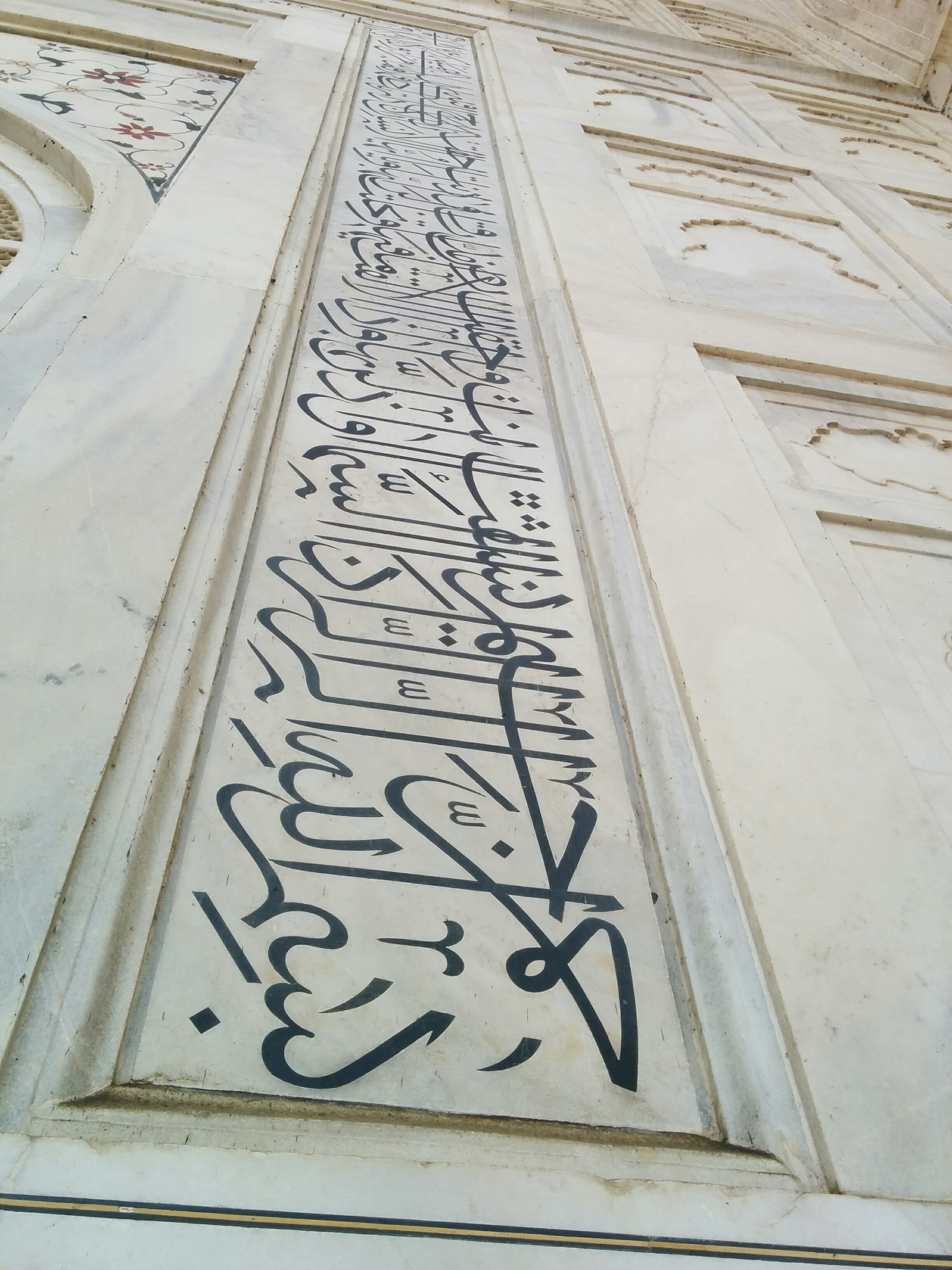
Quranic verses in Persian calligraphy style

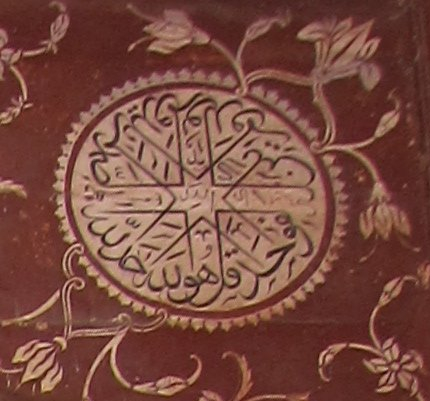
miḥrab, Taj Maḥal mosque (Al-Ikhlaṣ)

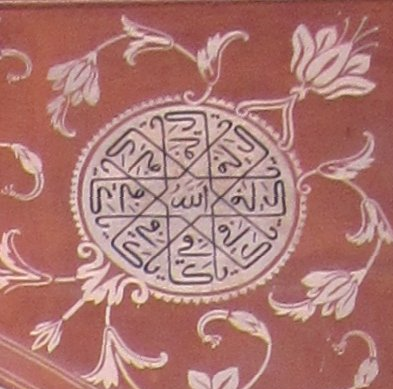
mihrab, Taj Mahal mosque

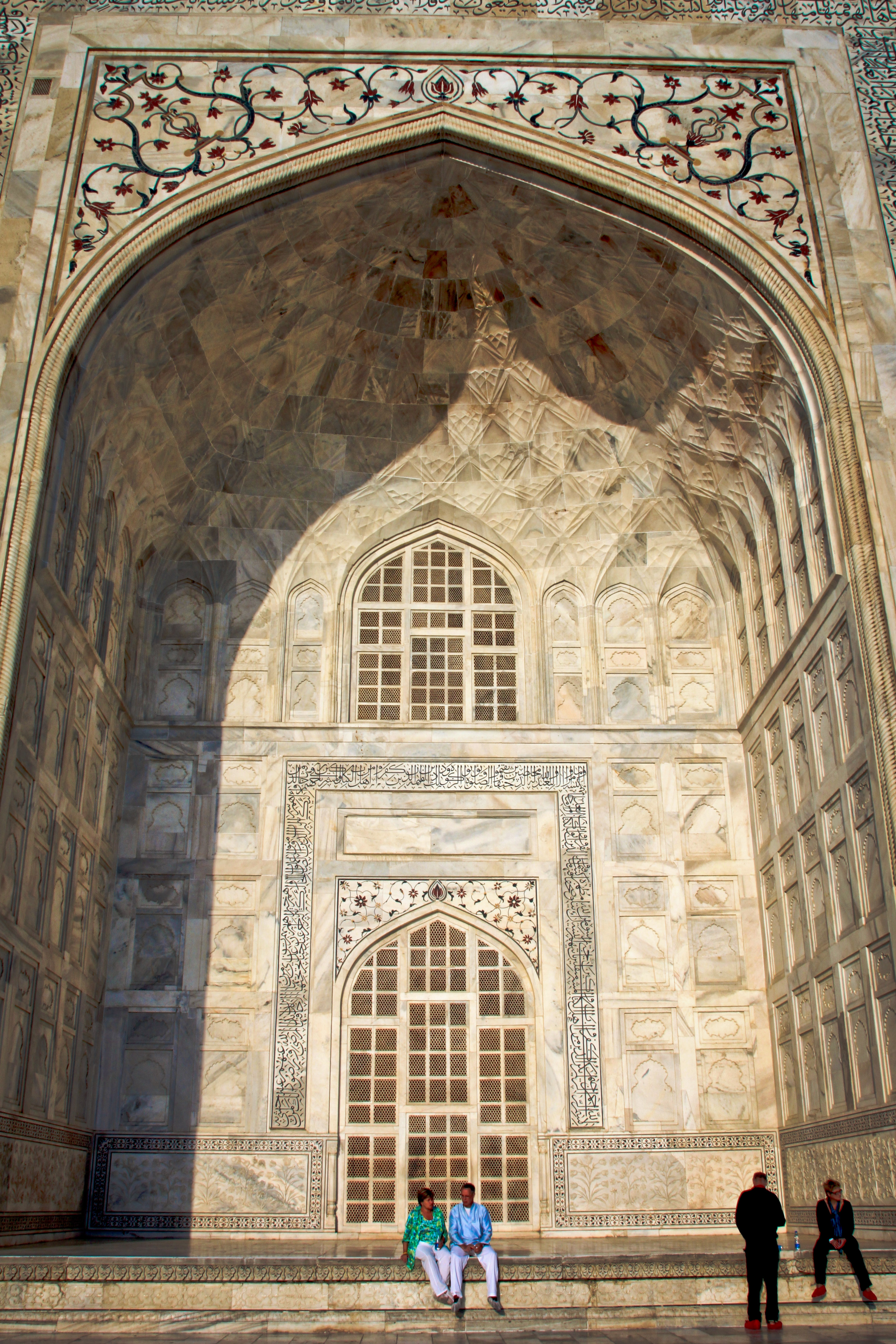
Taj mahal Quran verses in Persian calligraphy style

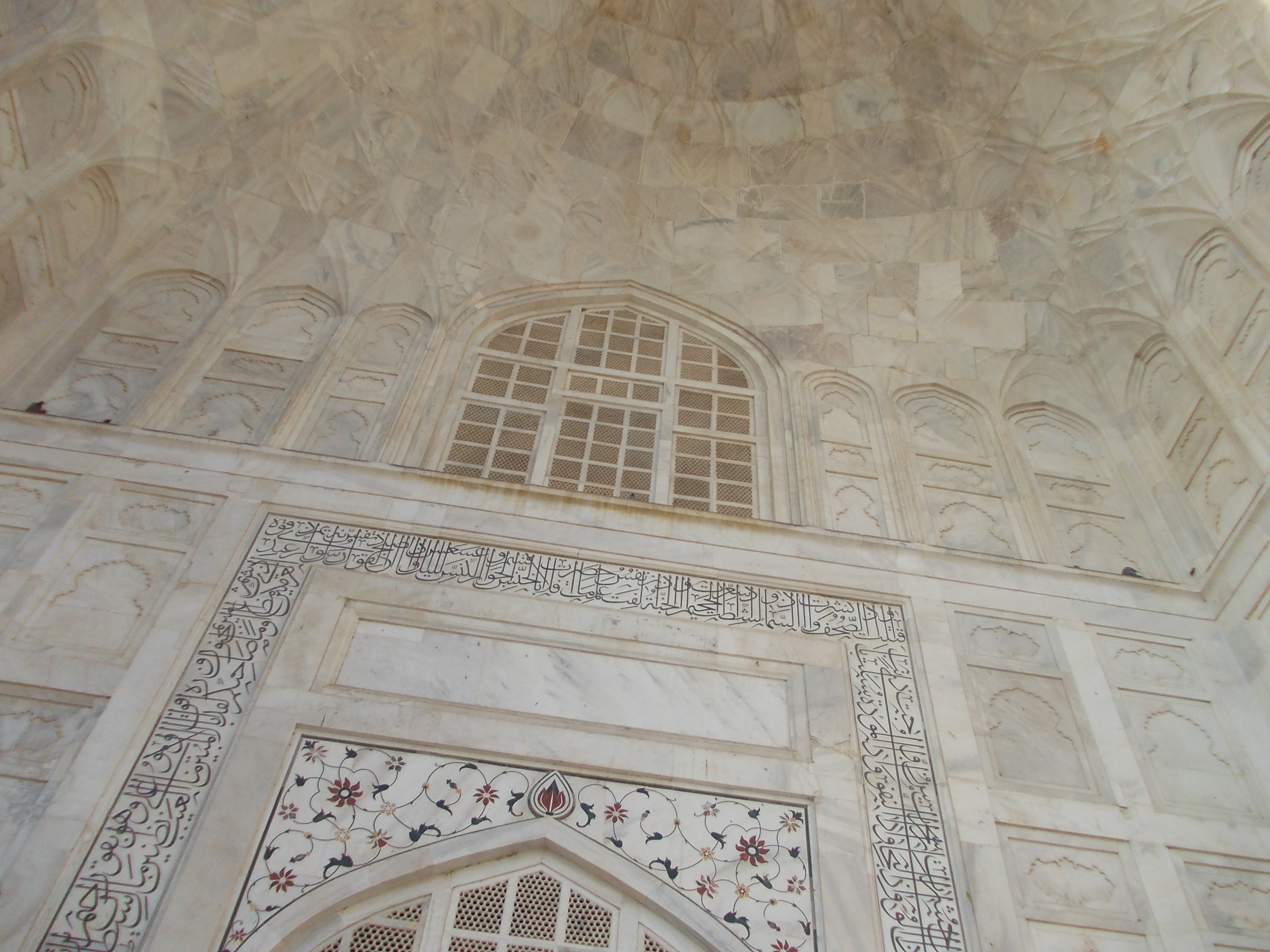
inside Taj mahal Quran verses in Persian calligraphy style

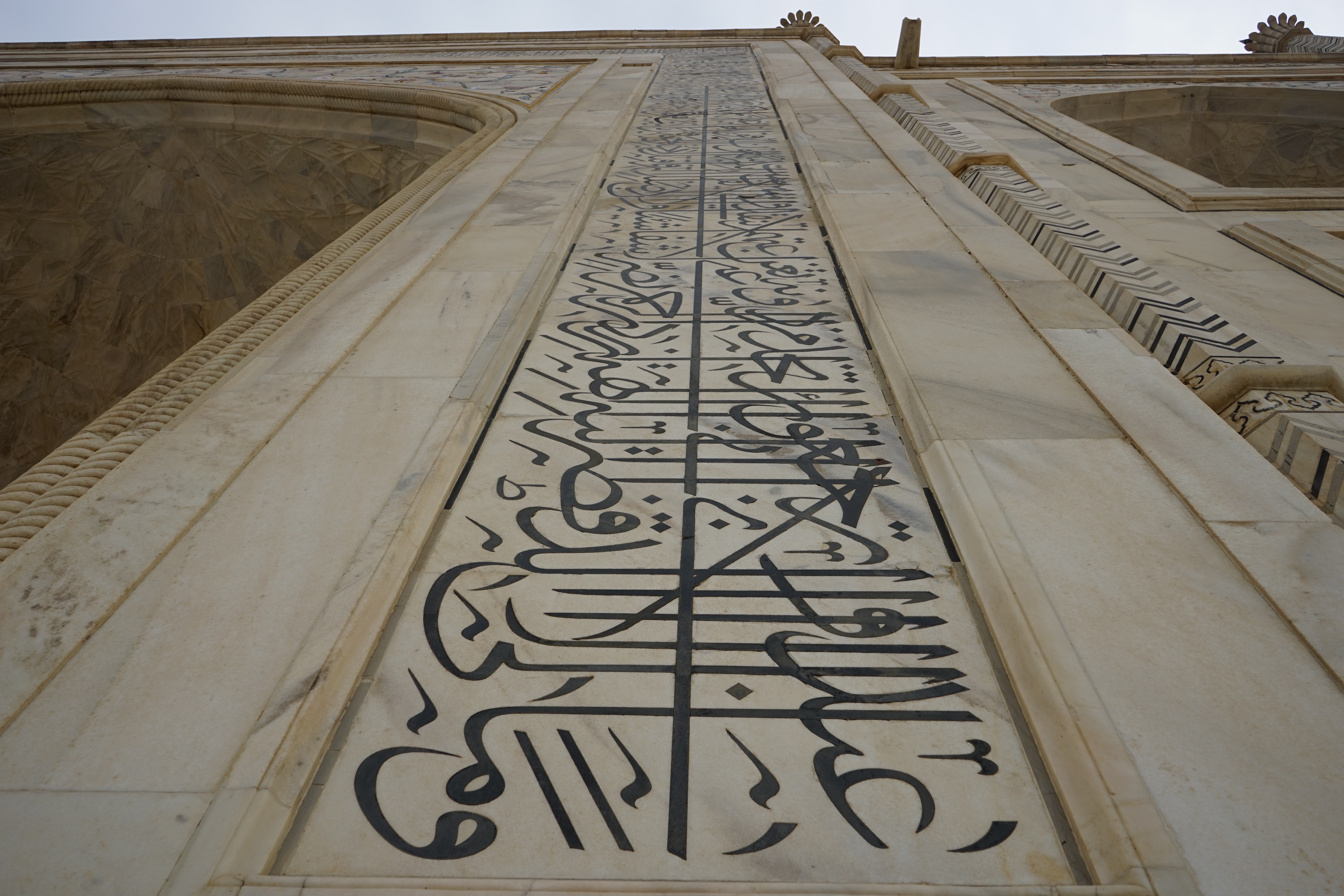
inside Taj mahal Quran verses in Persian calligraphy Sols

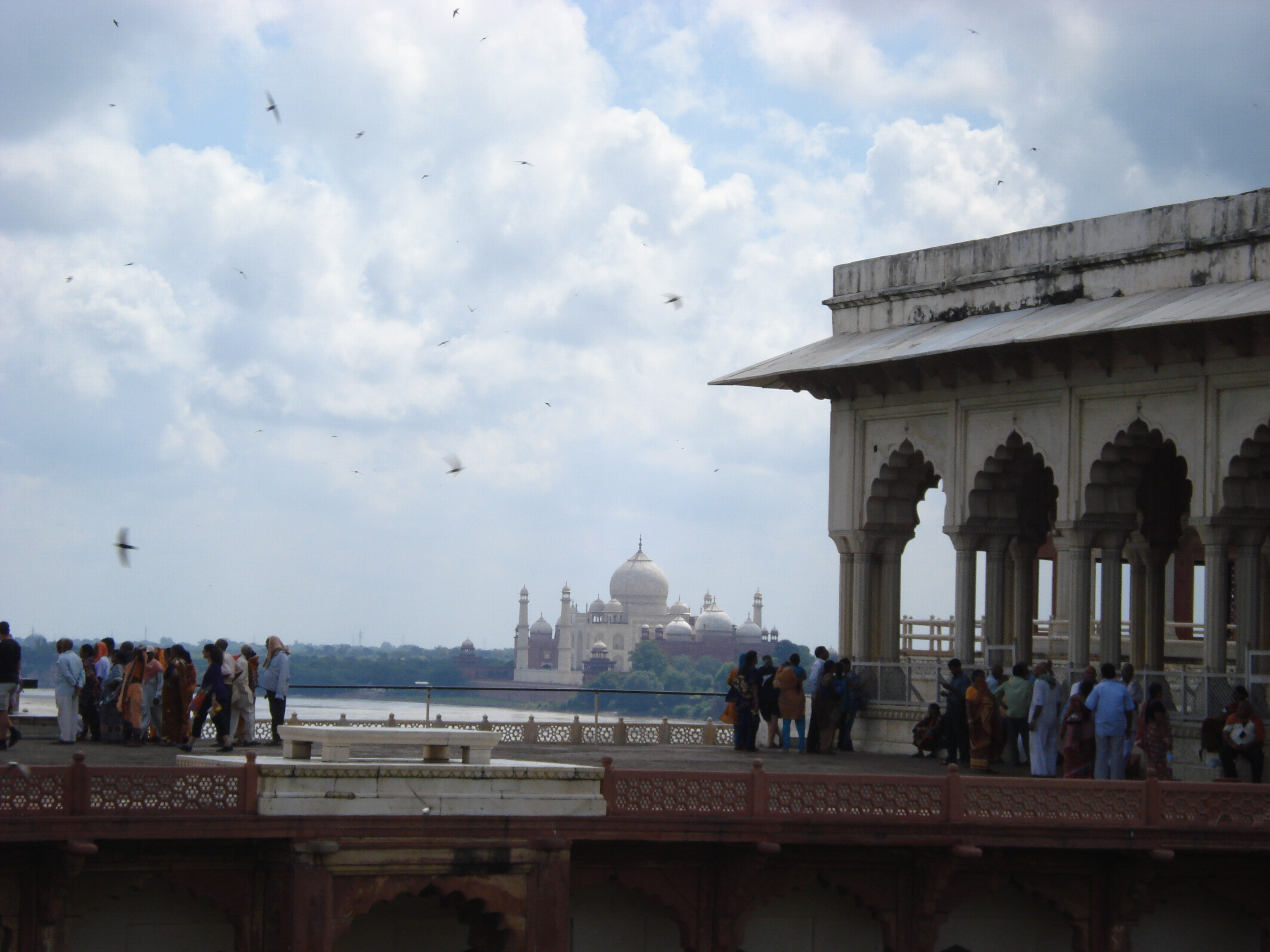
The Taj Mahal.

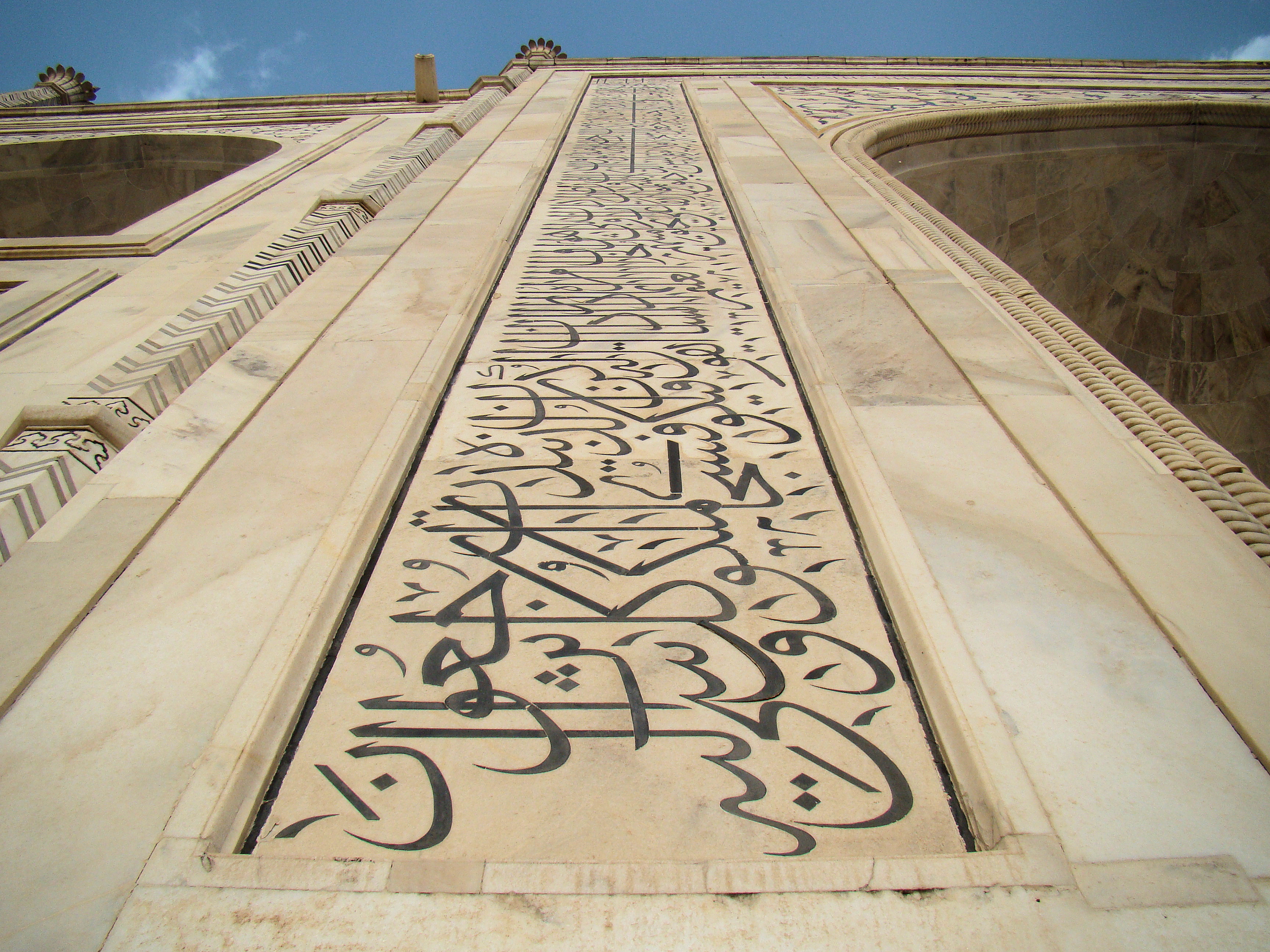
Taj Mahal, Agra

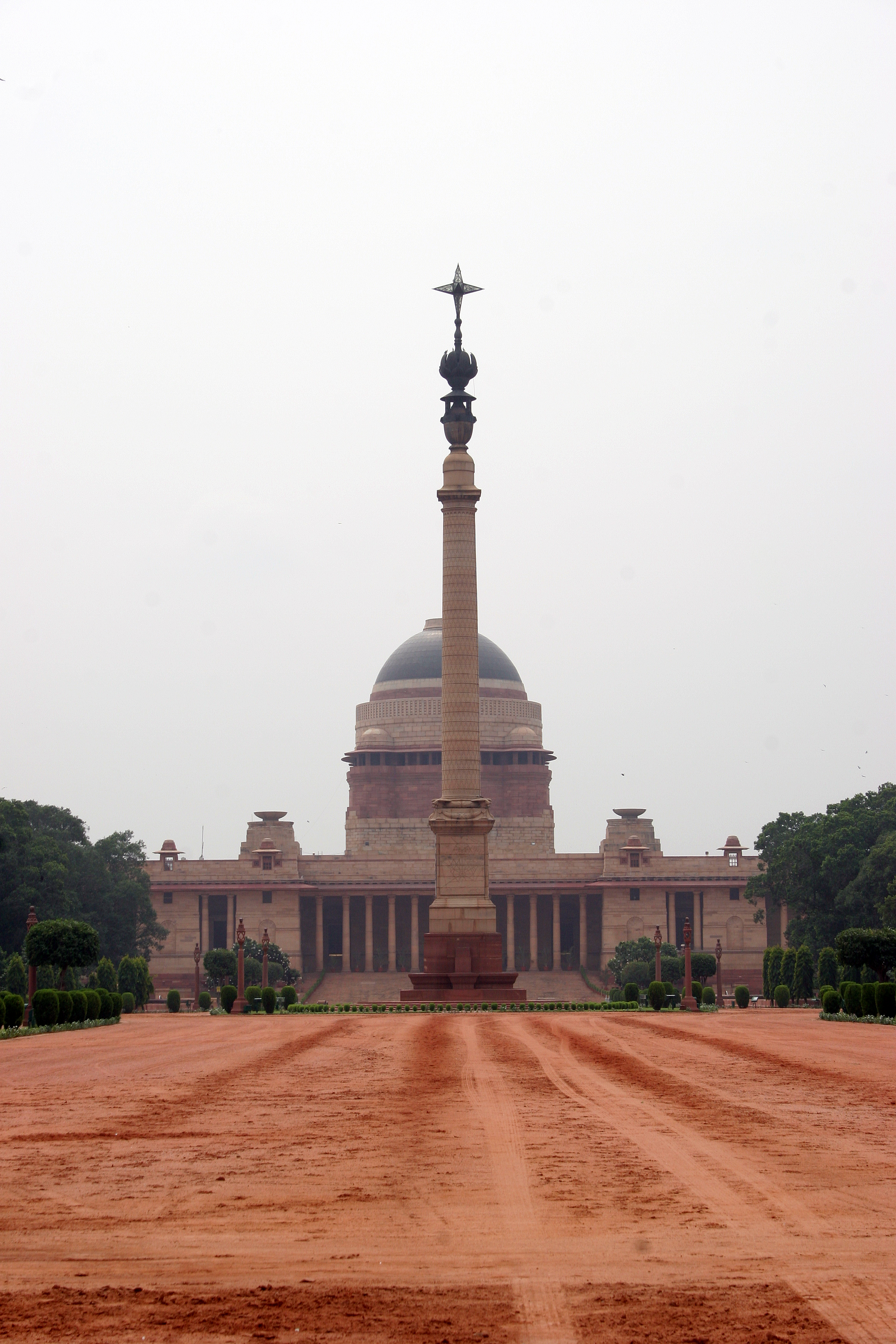
Rashtrapati Bhavan Indian presidential palace.

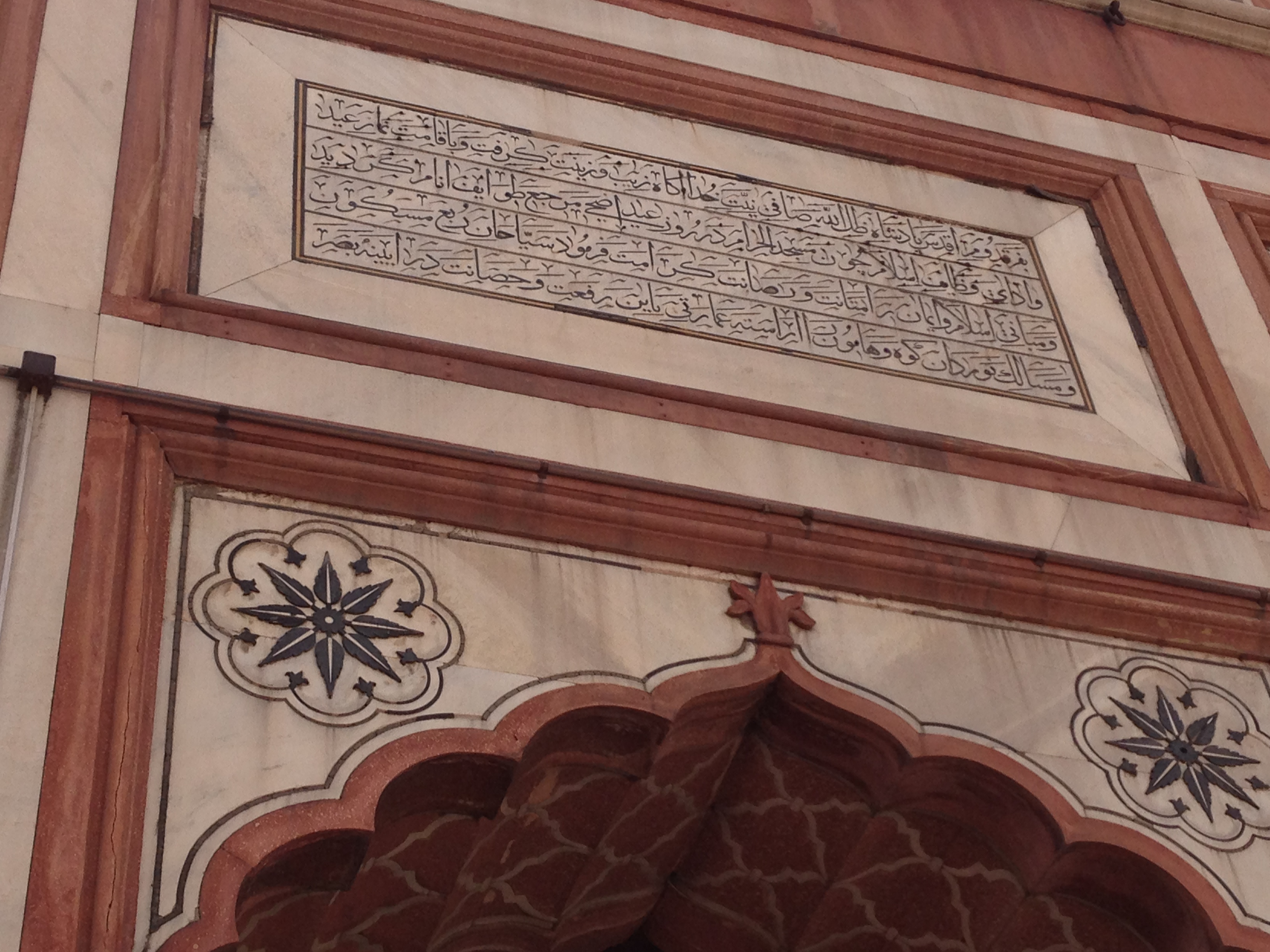
Jama Masjid, Delhi

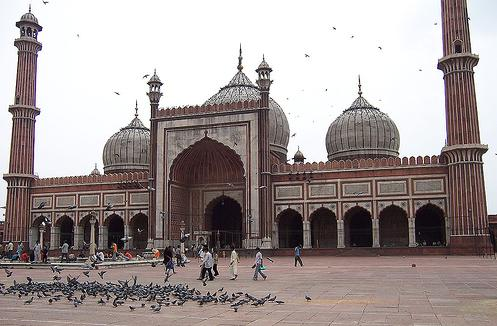
The Jama Masjid Old Delhi.

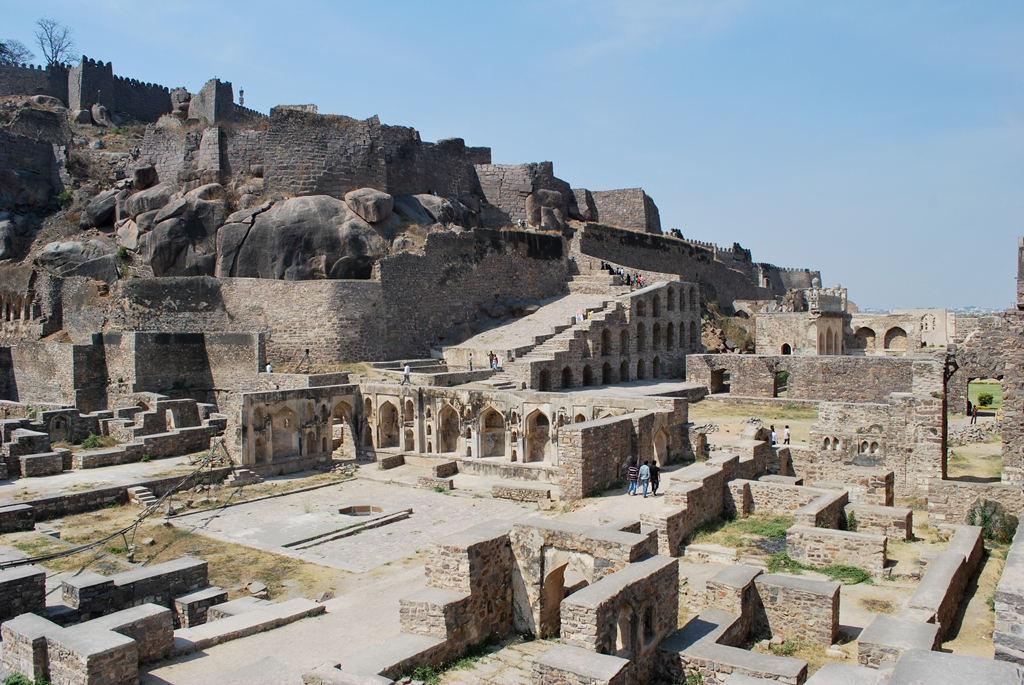
The ruins of the Golconda Fort

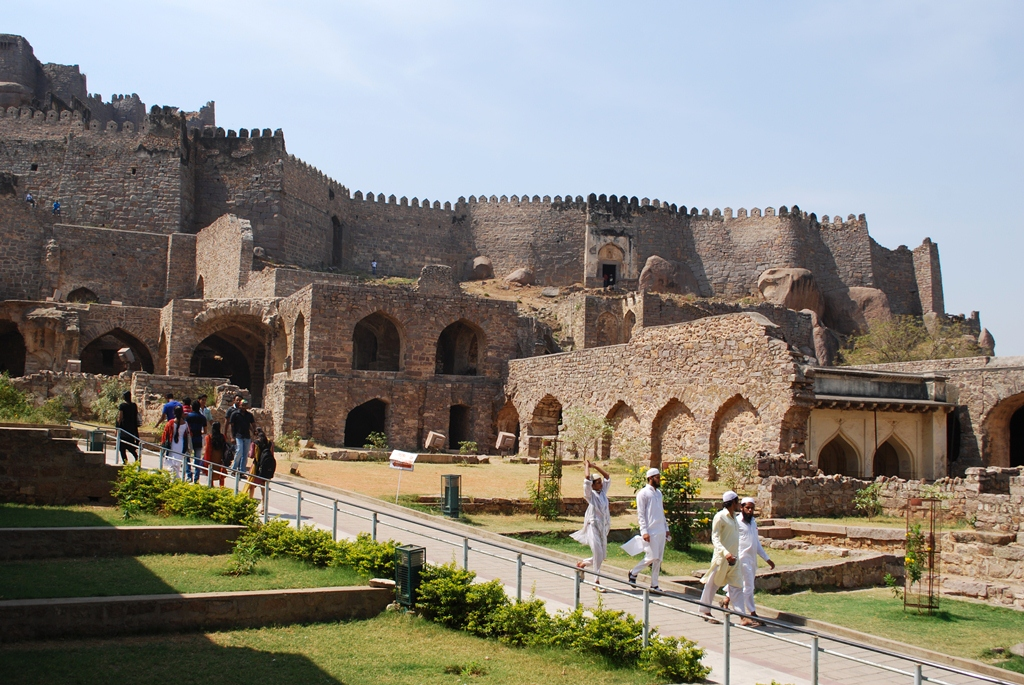
Golconda Fort, Hyderabad

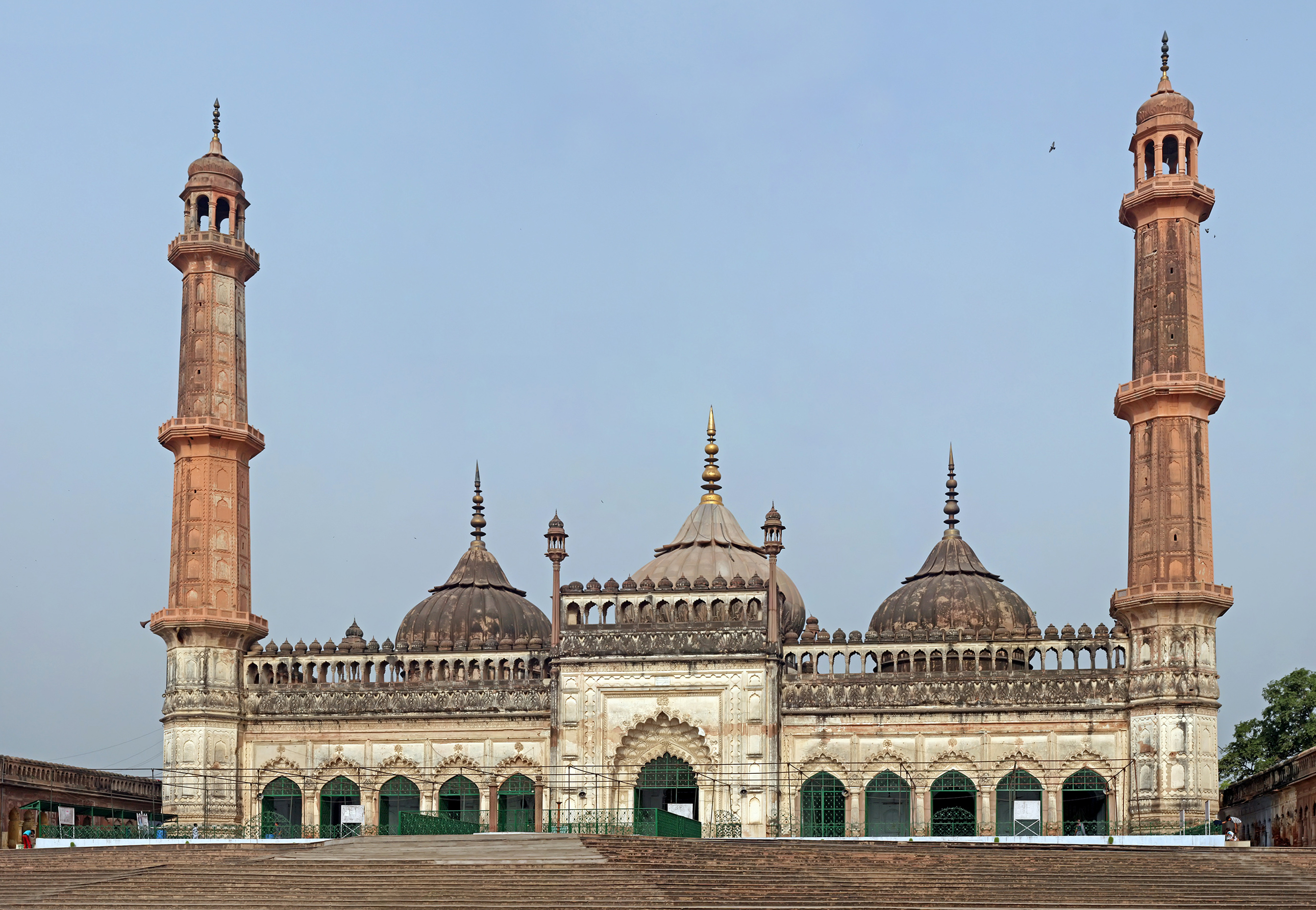
Asfi Mosque, Imambara, Lucknow

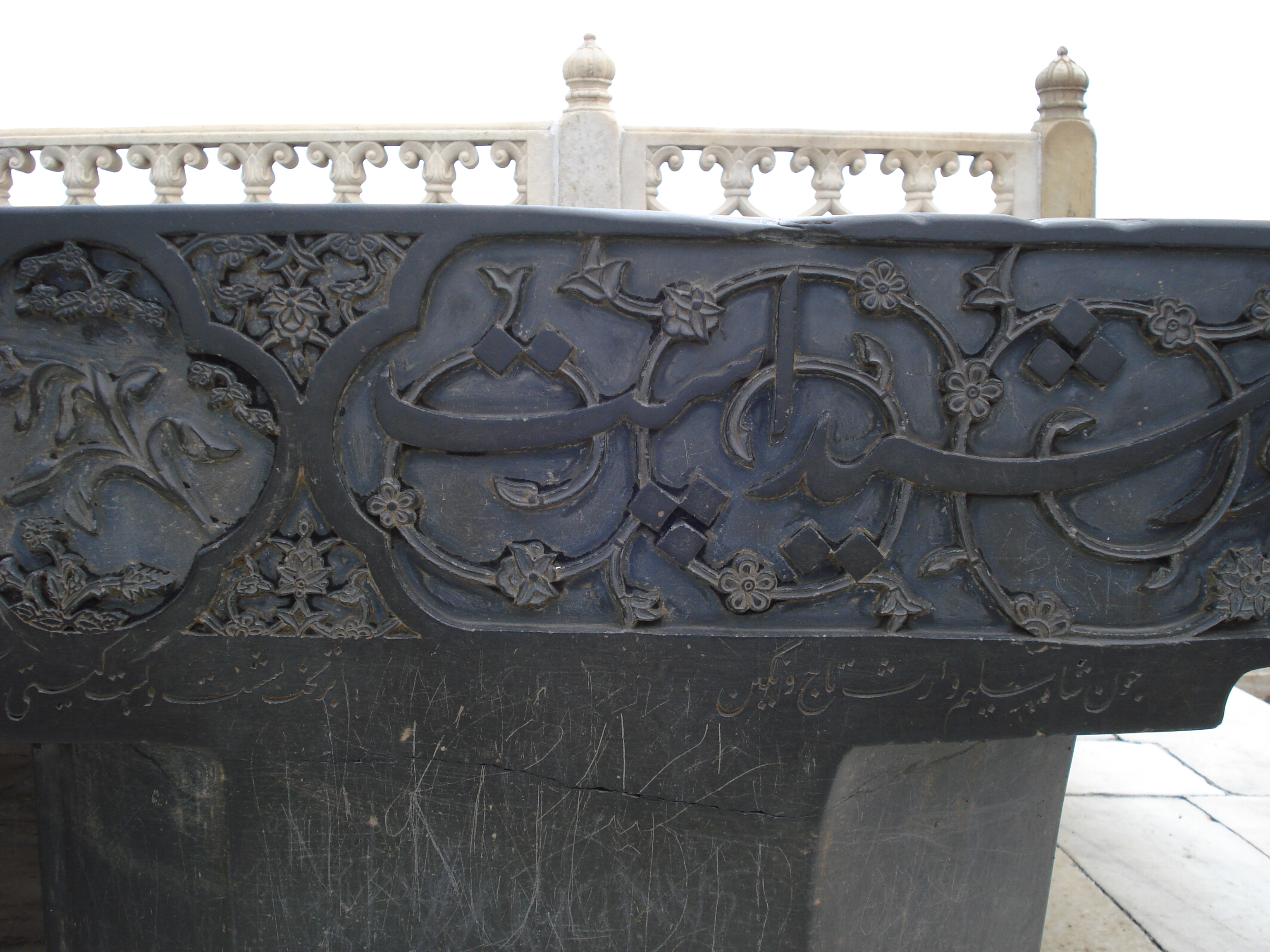
Calligraphy of several 18th-century Persian poems.

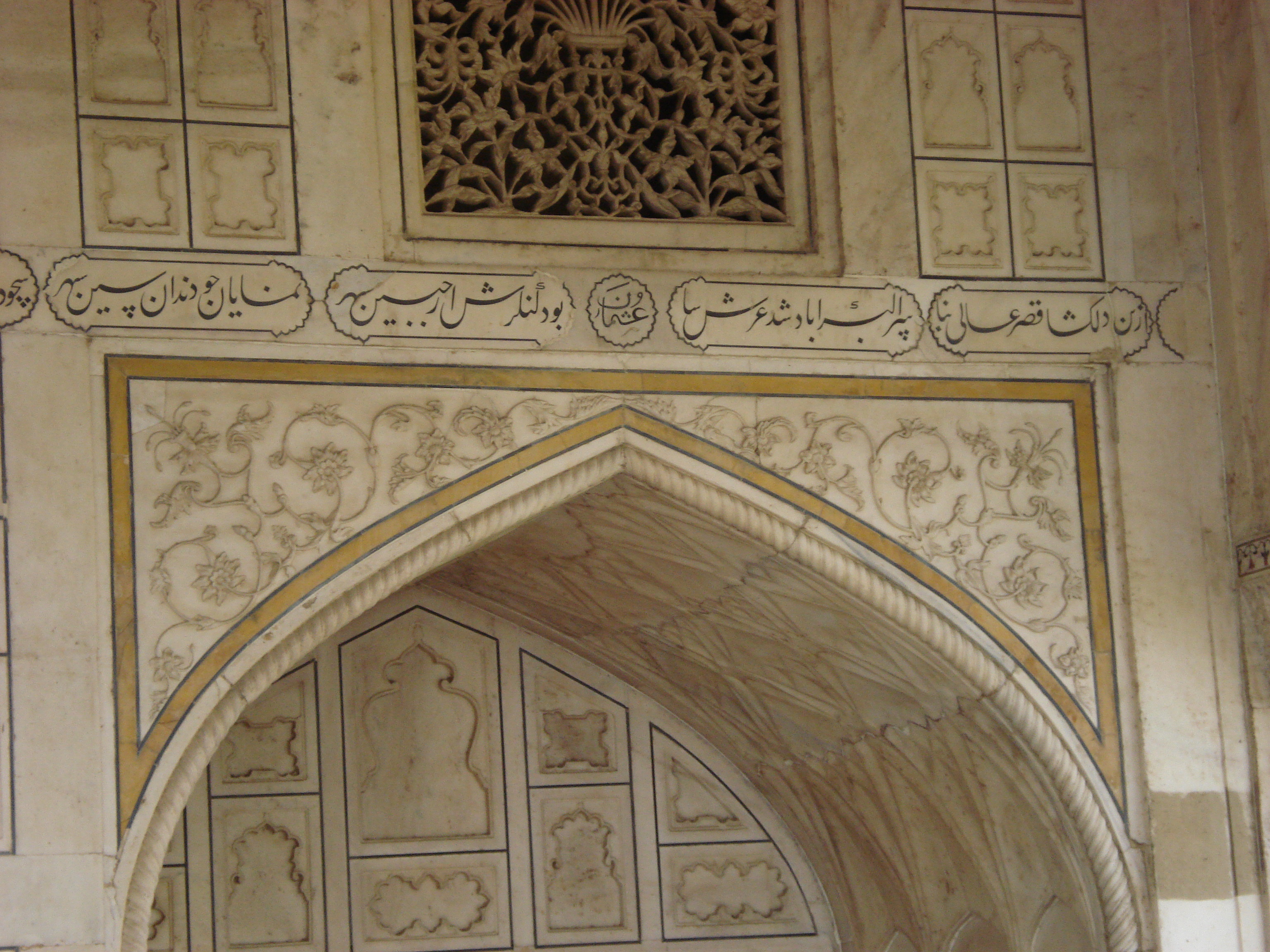
A Persian poem.

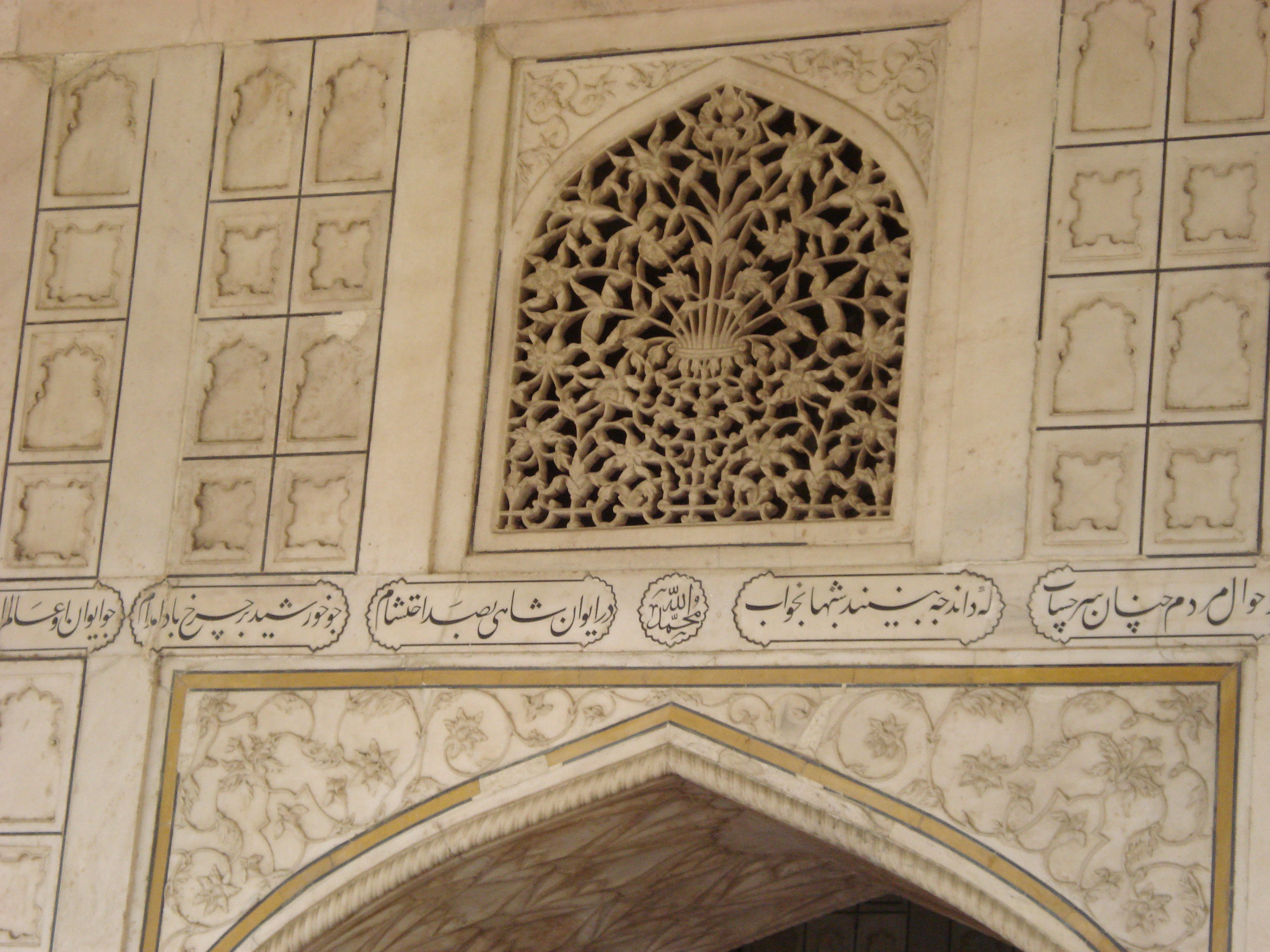
A Persian poem.

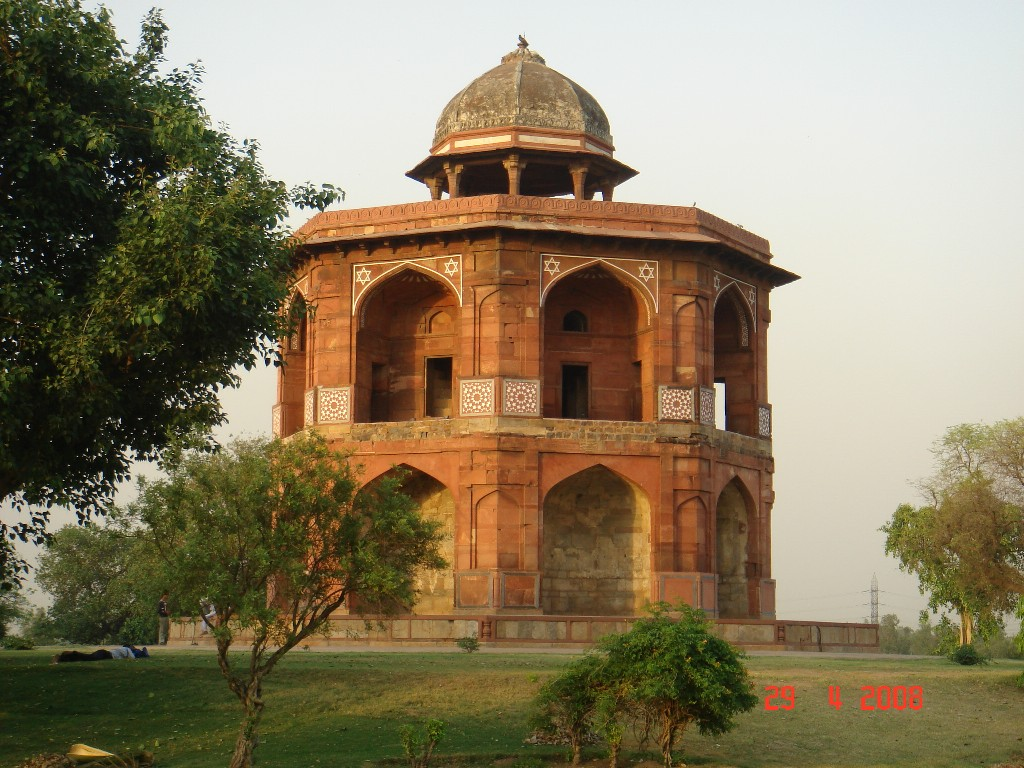
Sher Mandal in Purana Qila stands on an ancient mound.

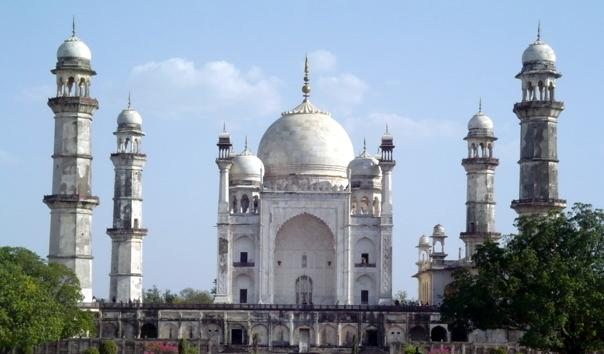
Bibi Ka Maqbara.

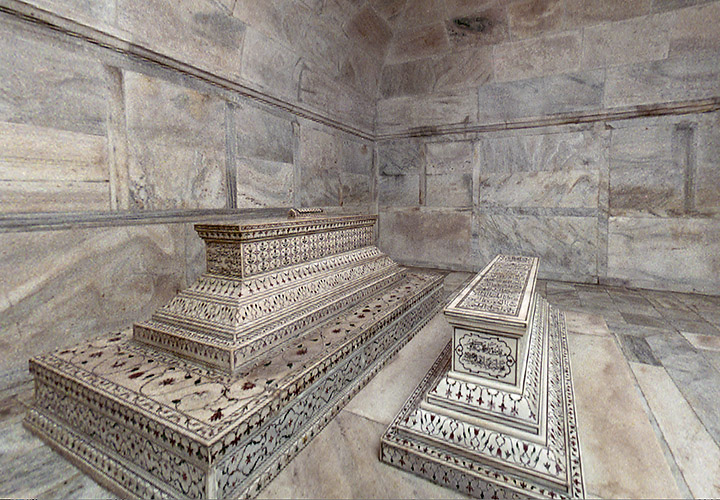
Tombs- Quranic verses with Calligraphy Persian Nask style.

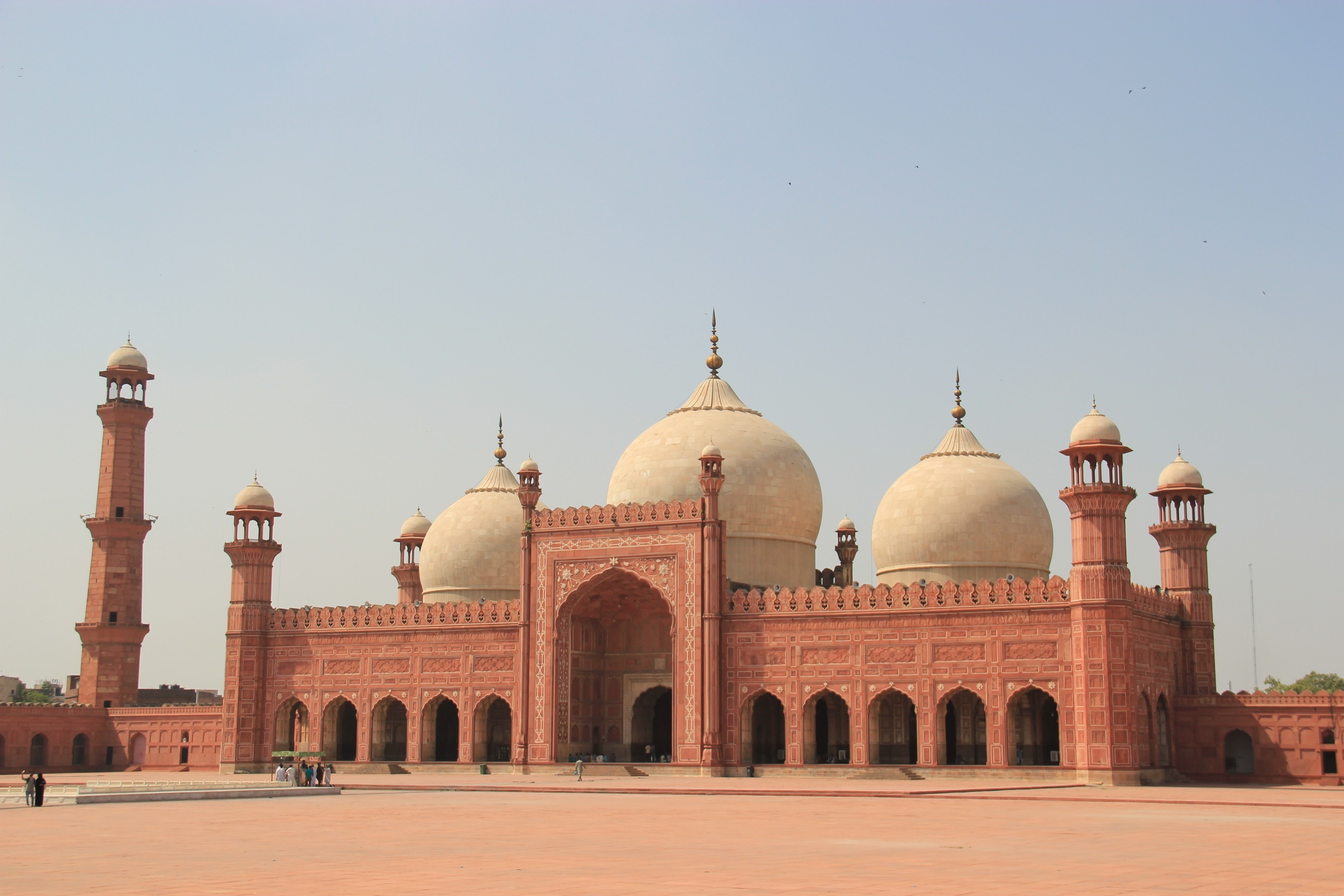
Badshahi Mosque front picture

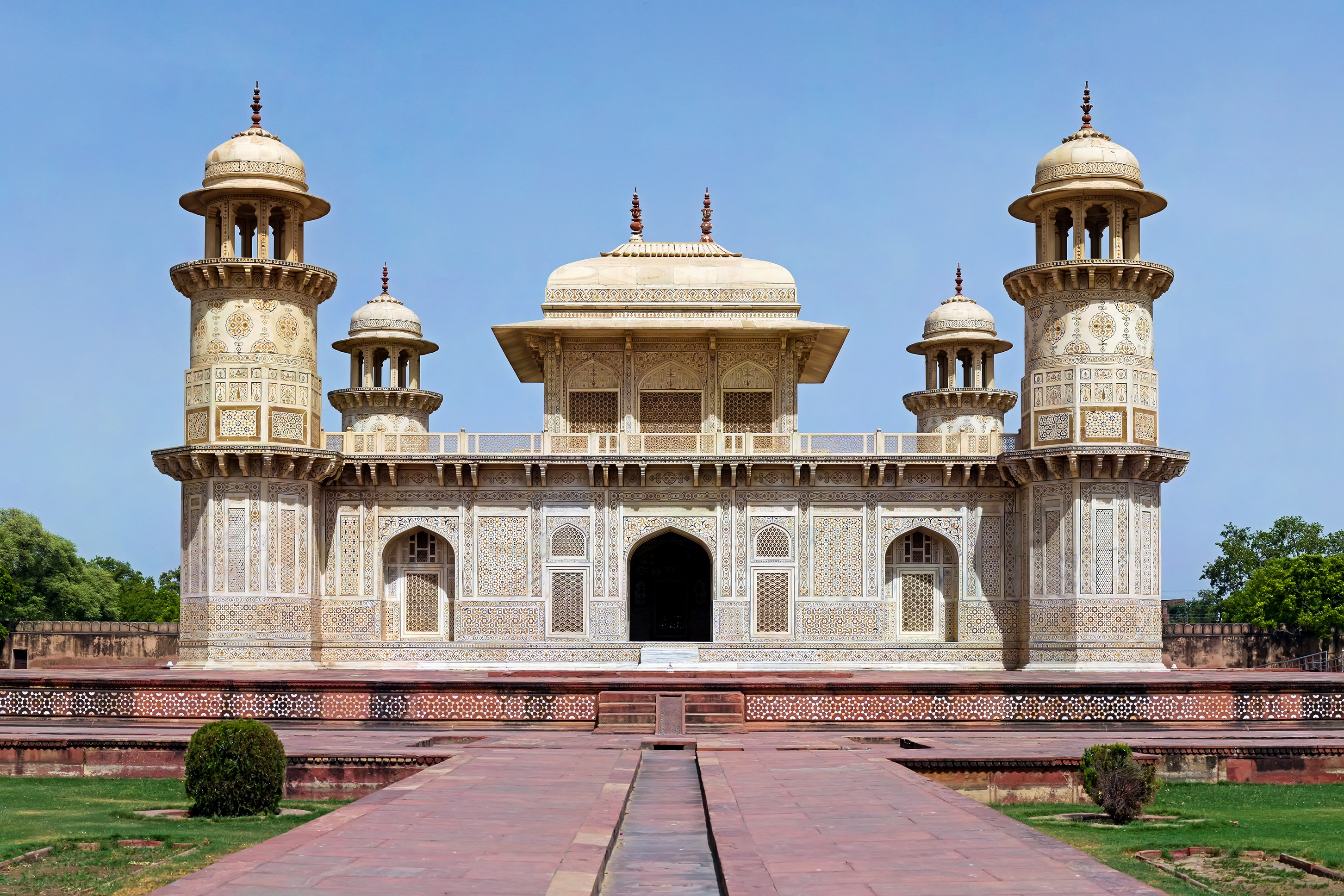
I'timād-ud-Daulah, Agra

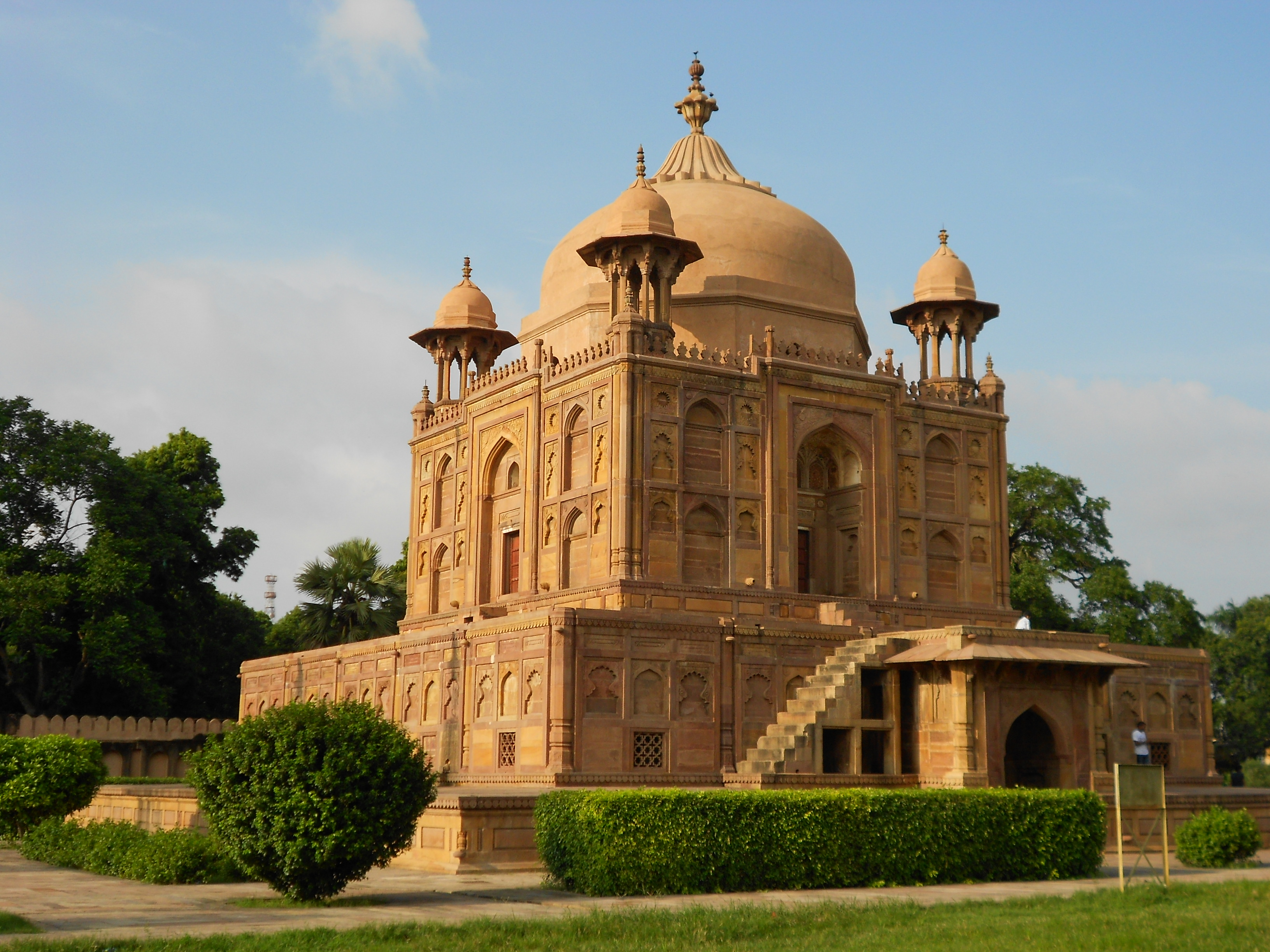
Tomb of Nisar Begum at Khusro Bagh Allahabad

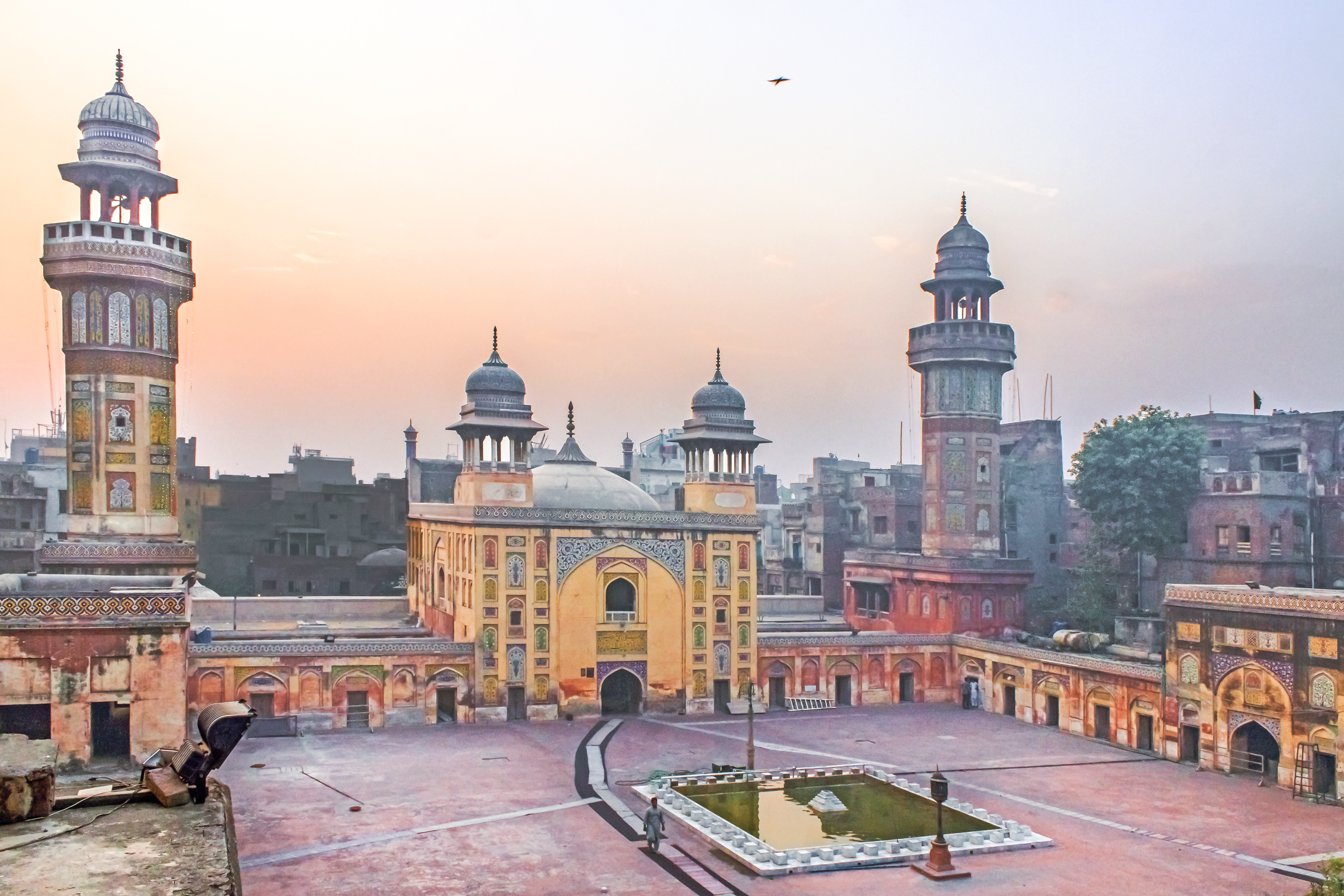
The-Existence.&quot Pakistan;le

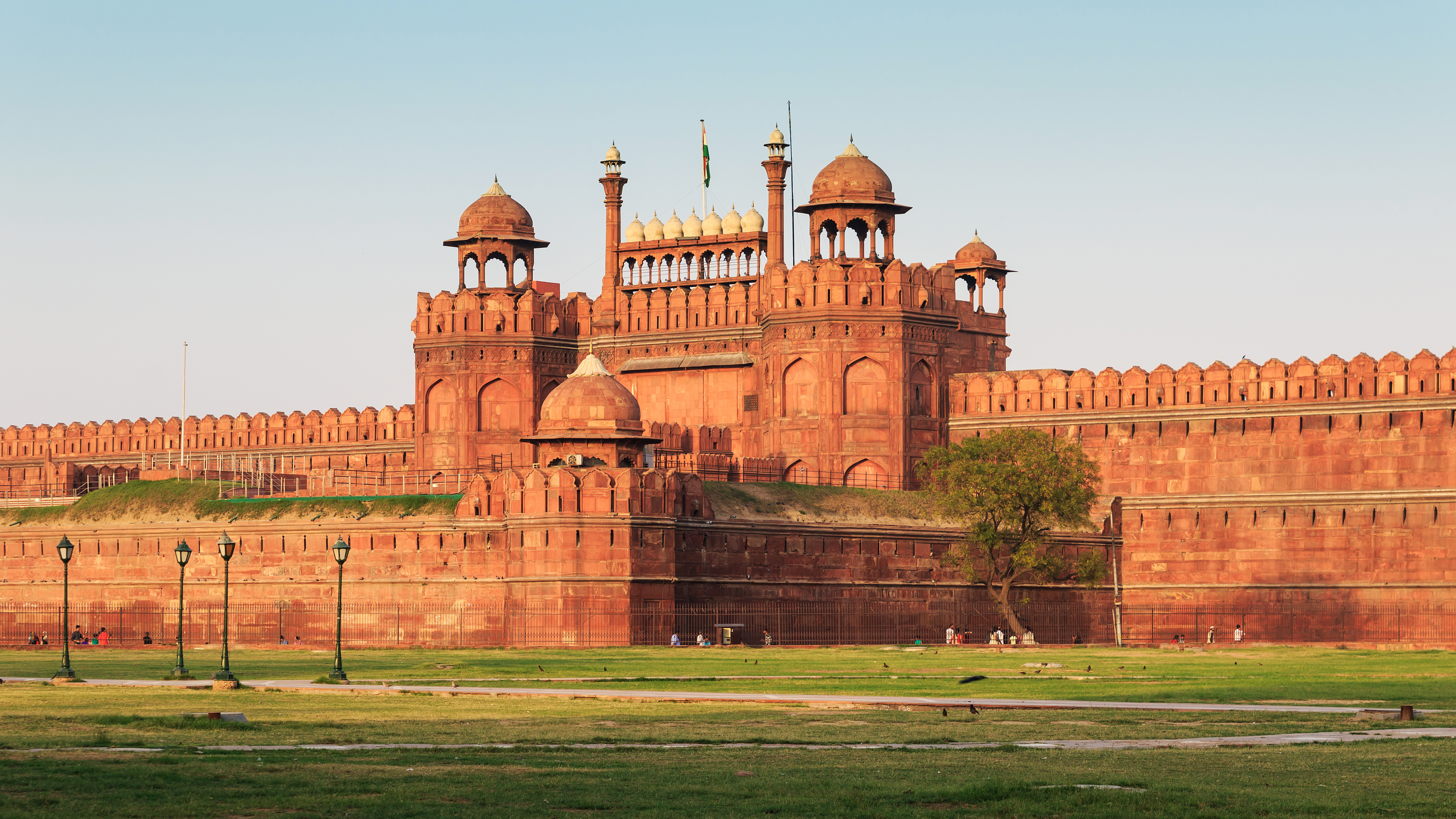
Lahori Gate of the Red Fort, Delhi, India.

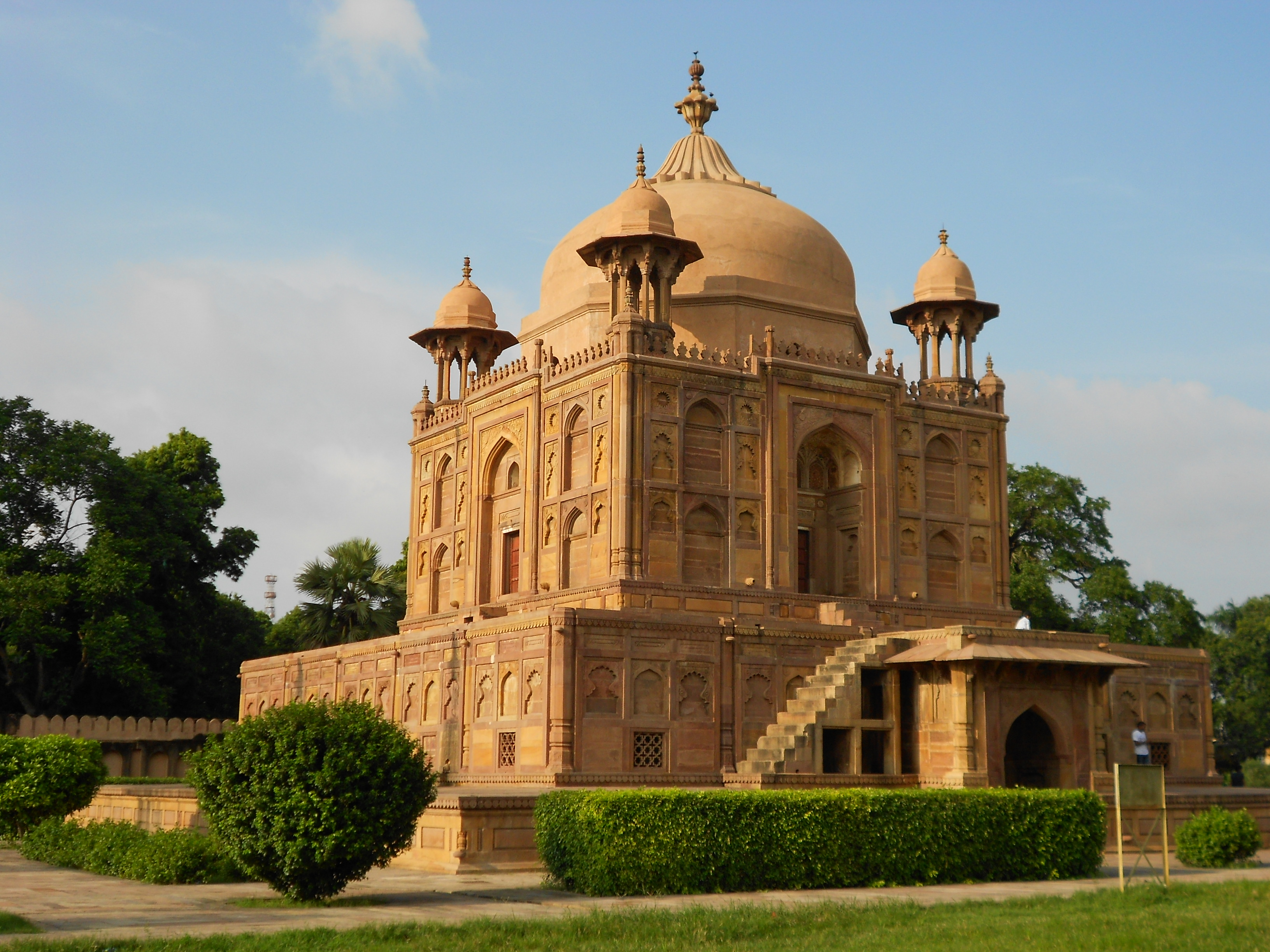
Tomb of Nithar Begum at Khusro Bagh, Allahabad,

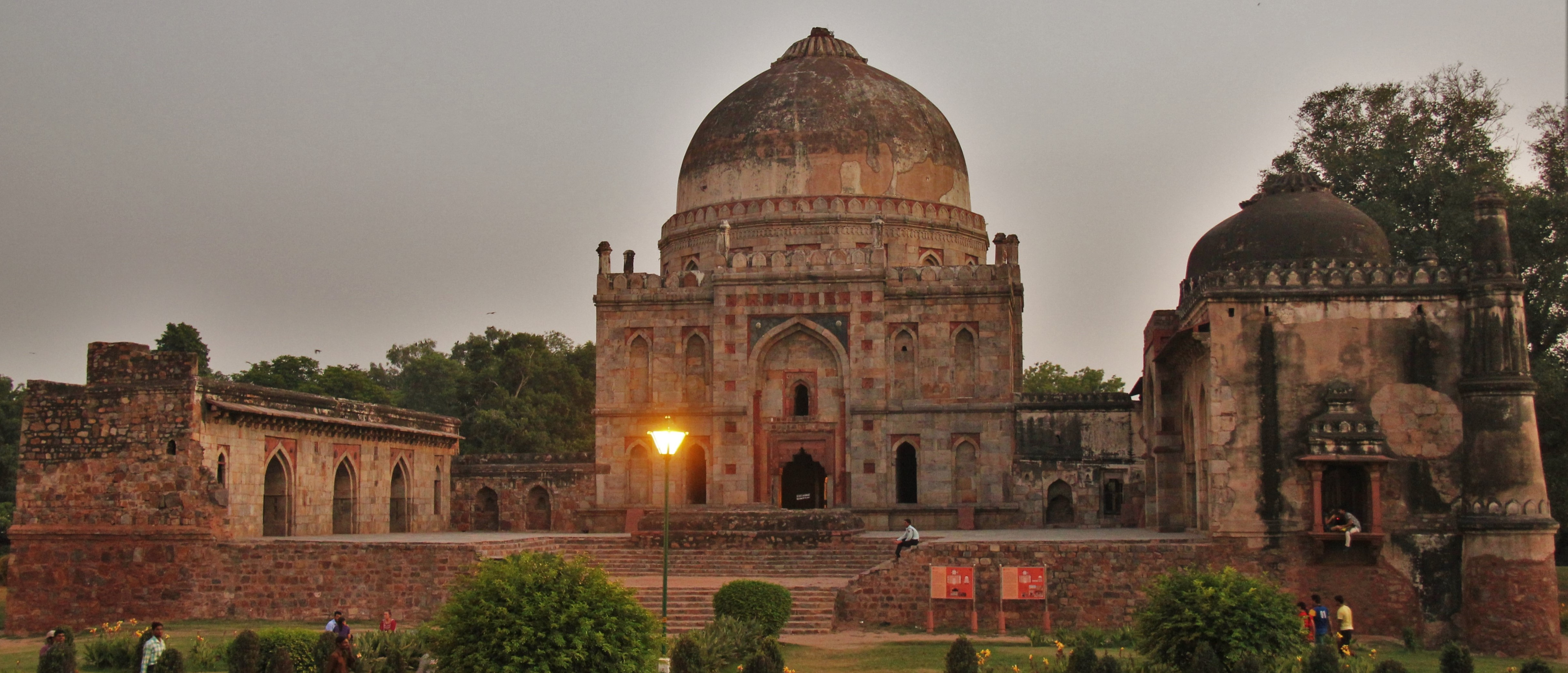
The Bara Gumbad and Bara Gumbad Mosque in the Lodi Gardens.

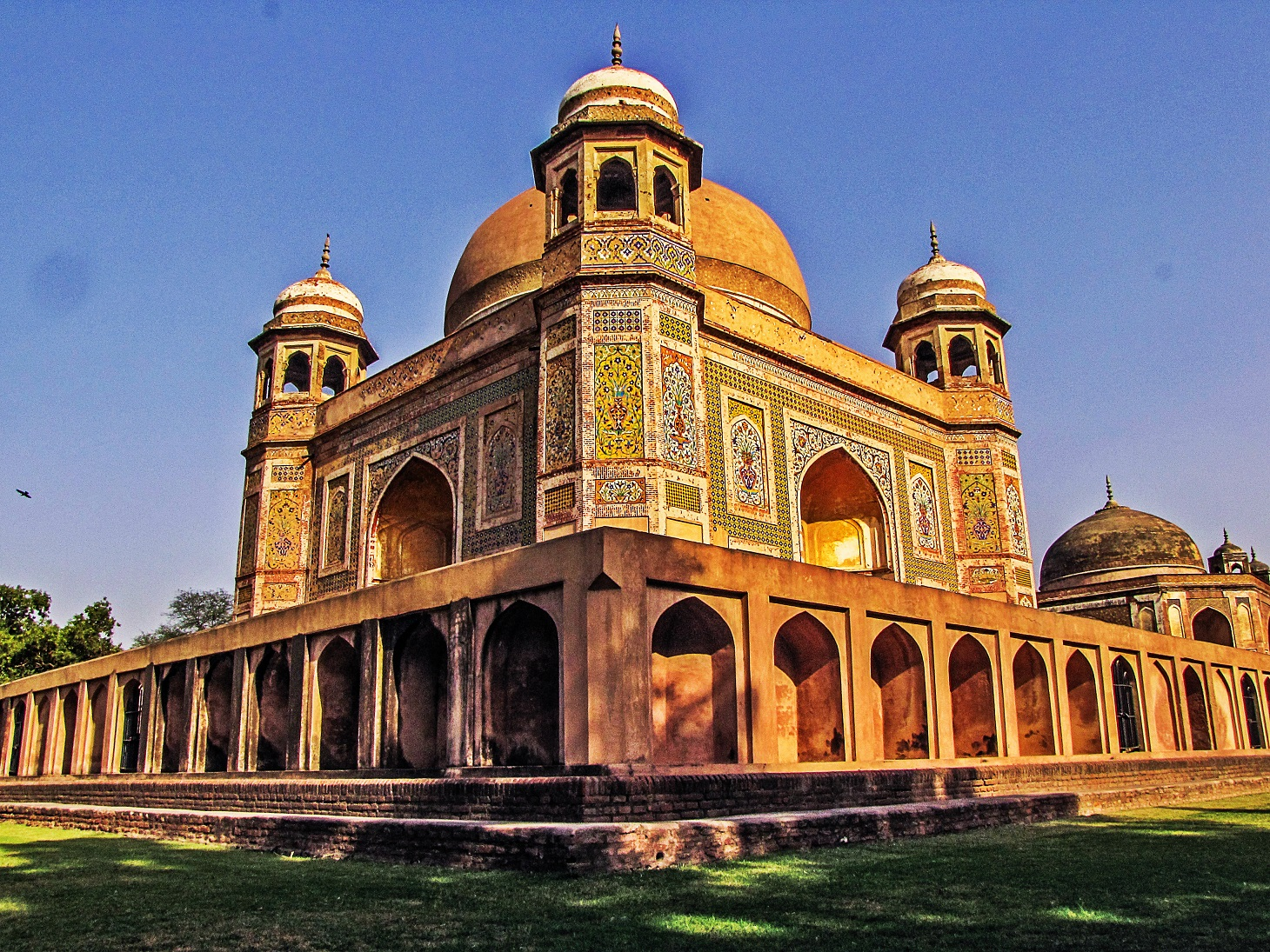
One of the Tombs of Ustad-Shagird, Nakodar, India.

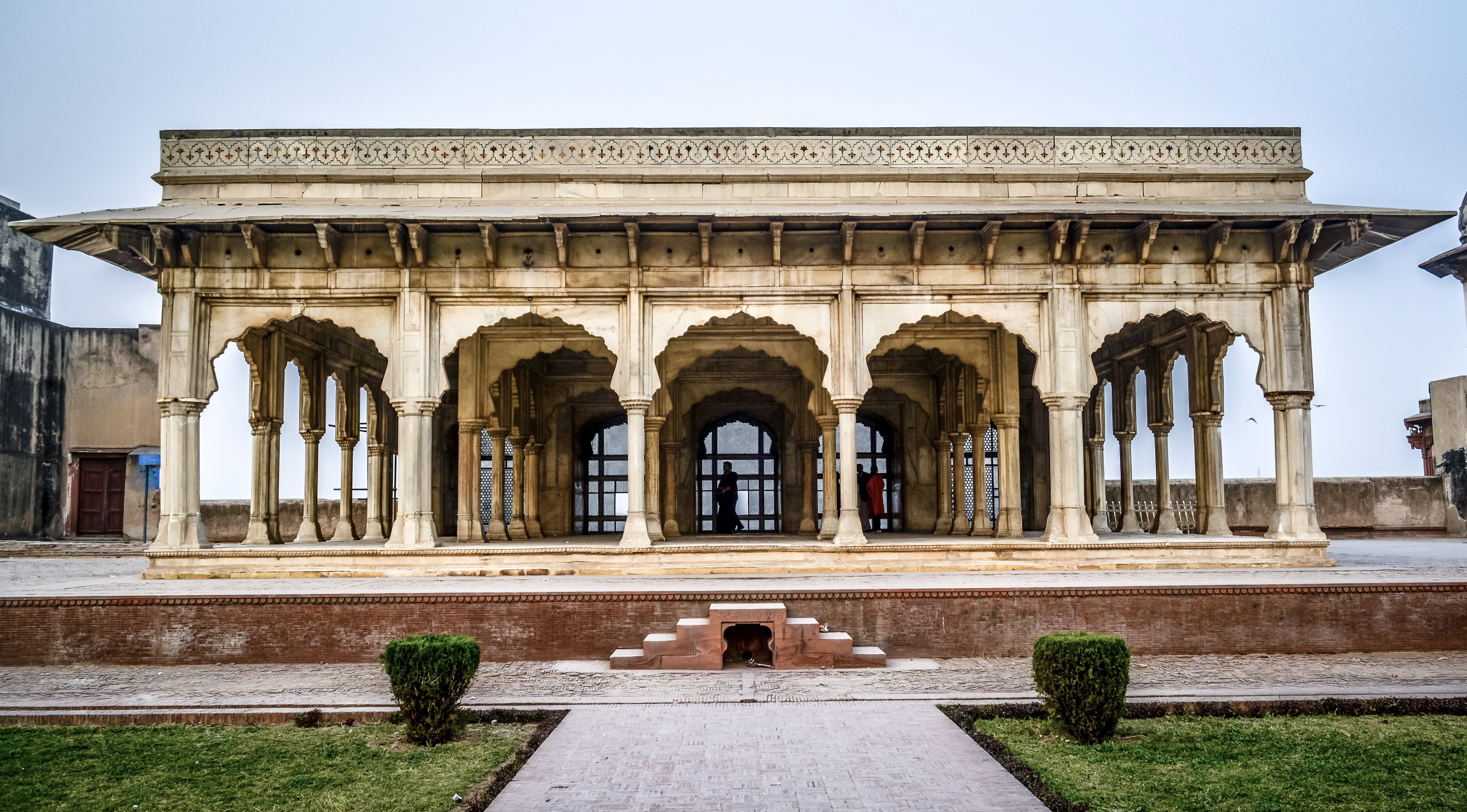
Dewan-e-Khas

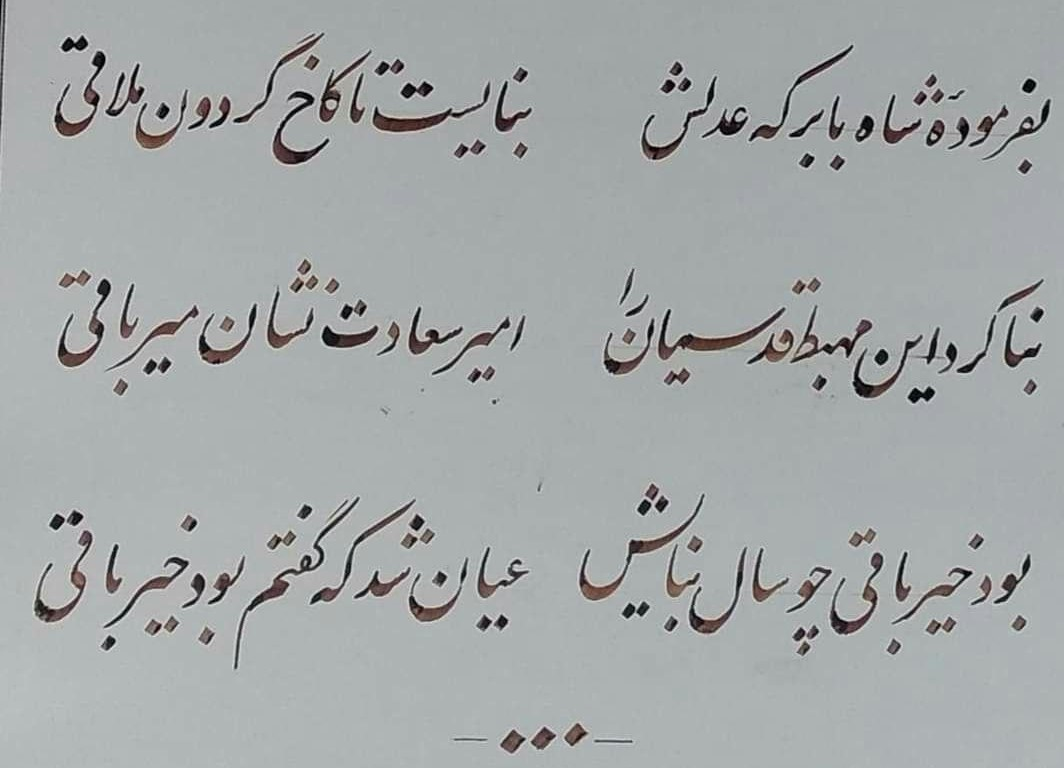
a replica from the Baberi Mosque inscription

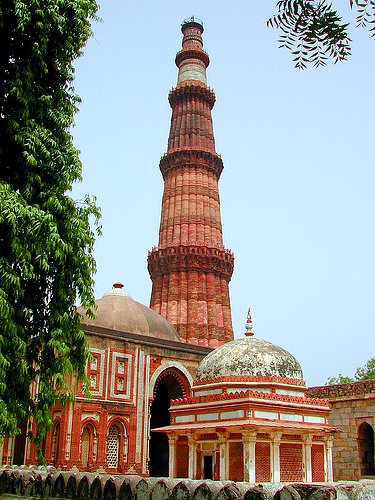
At 72.5m tall, the 13th-century Qutub Minar is the world's tallest brick minaret.

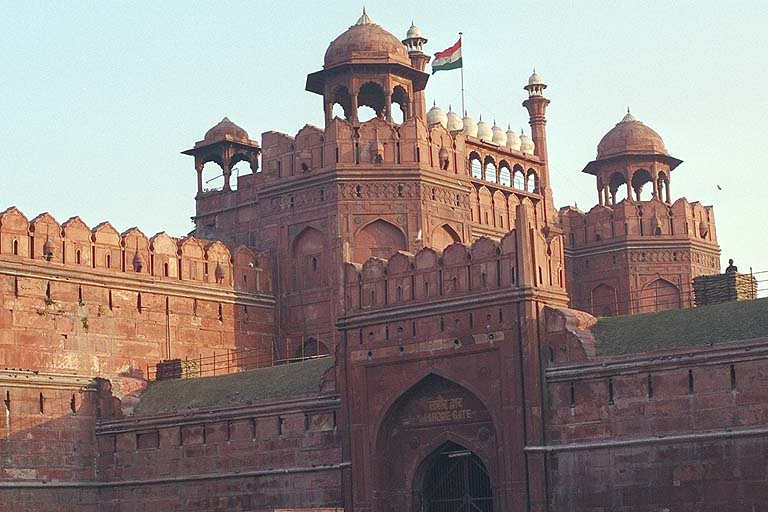
The Red Fort and Independence Day.

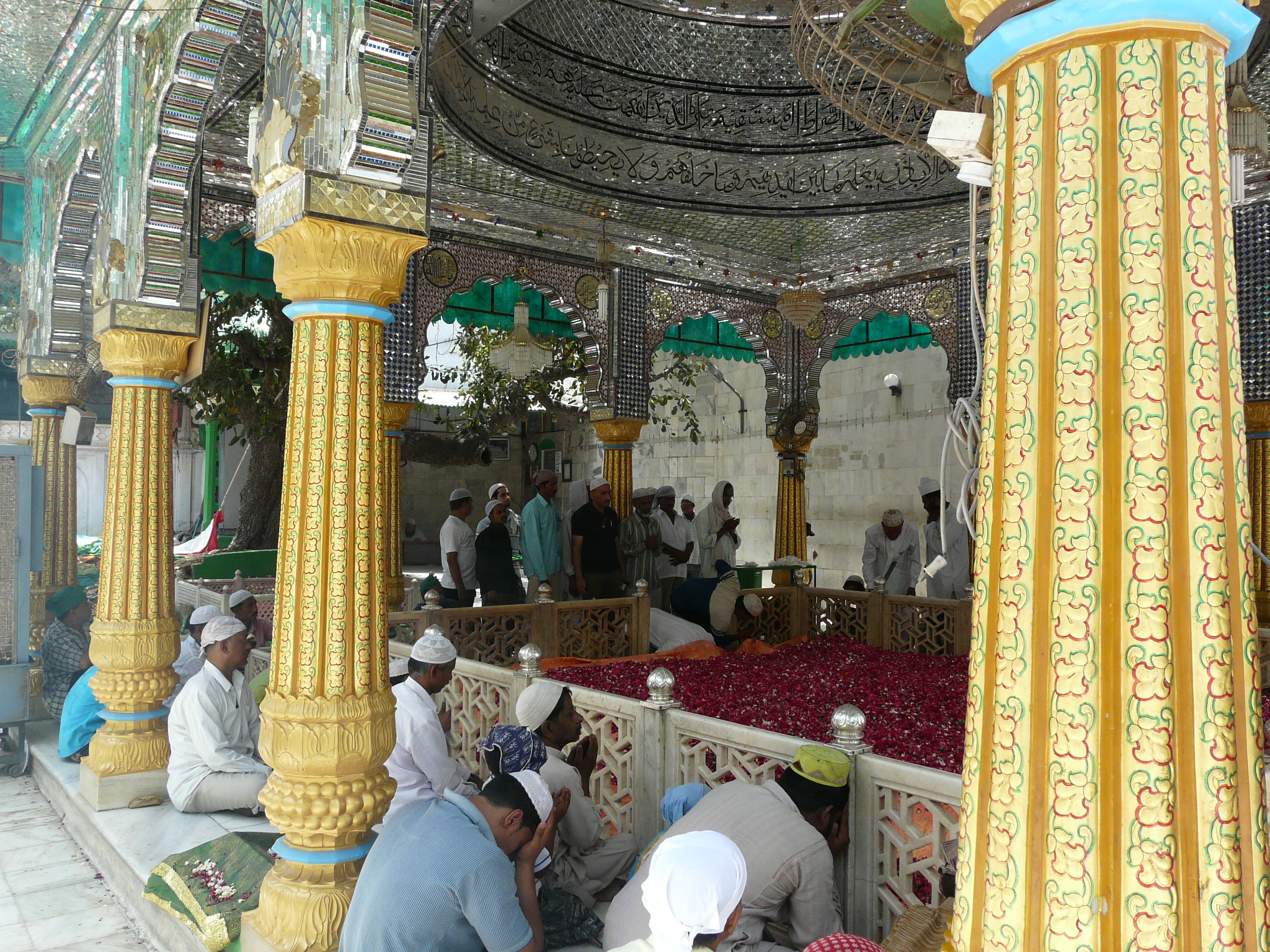
Qutbuddin Bakhtiar Kaki's dargah in Mehrauli, Delhi.

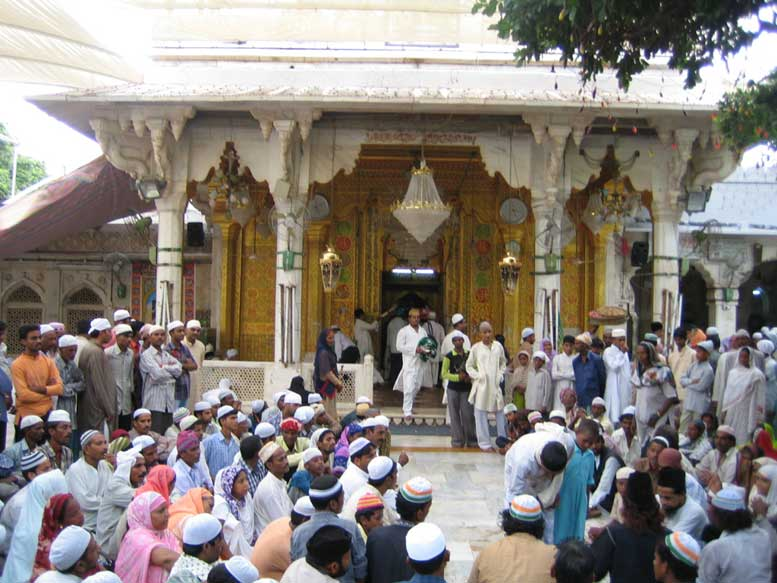
The dargah of Moinuddin Chishti, Ajmer.

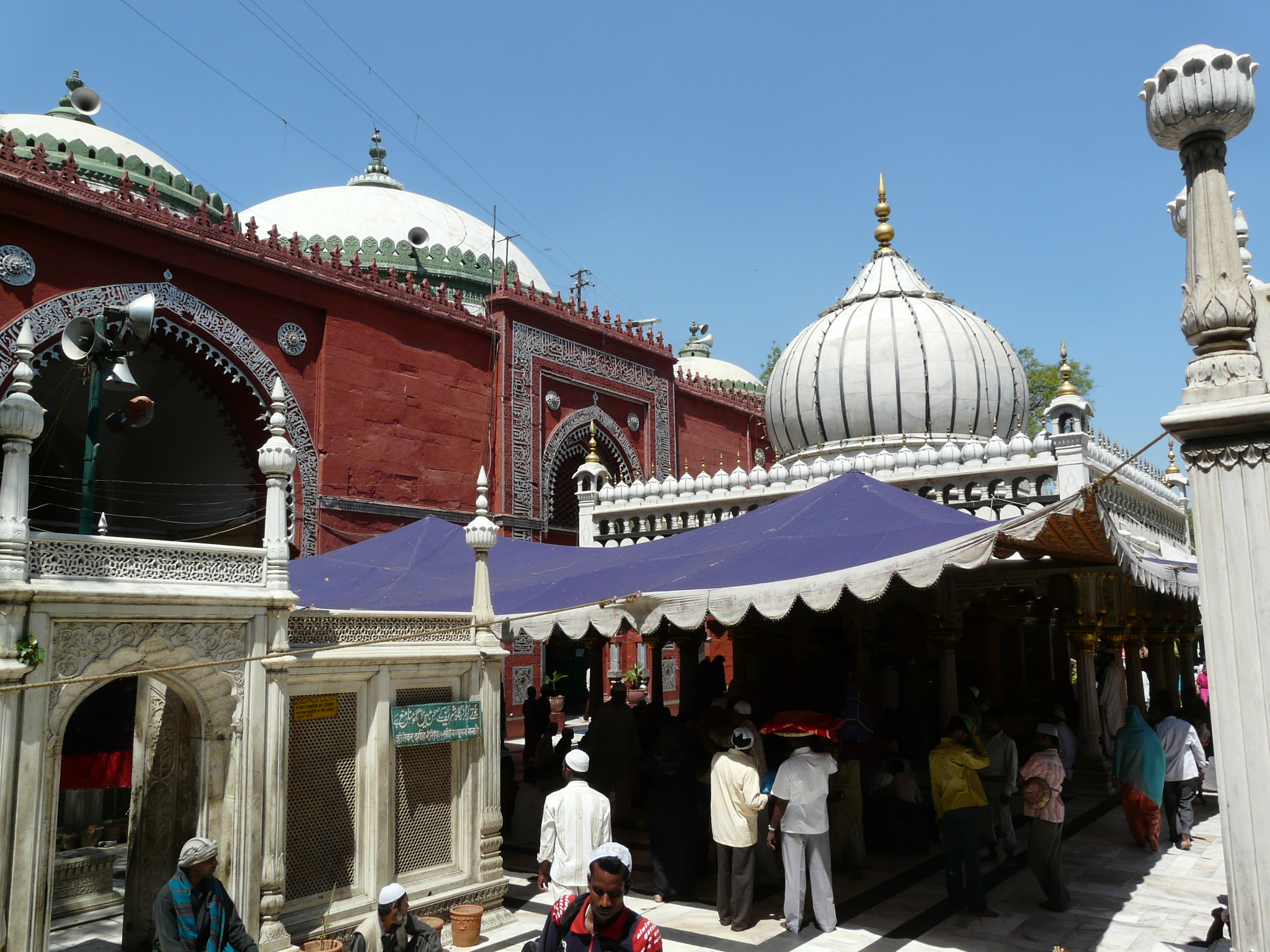
The Nizamuddin Dargah in Delhi.

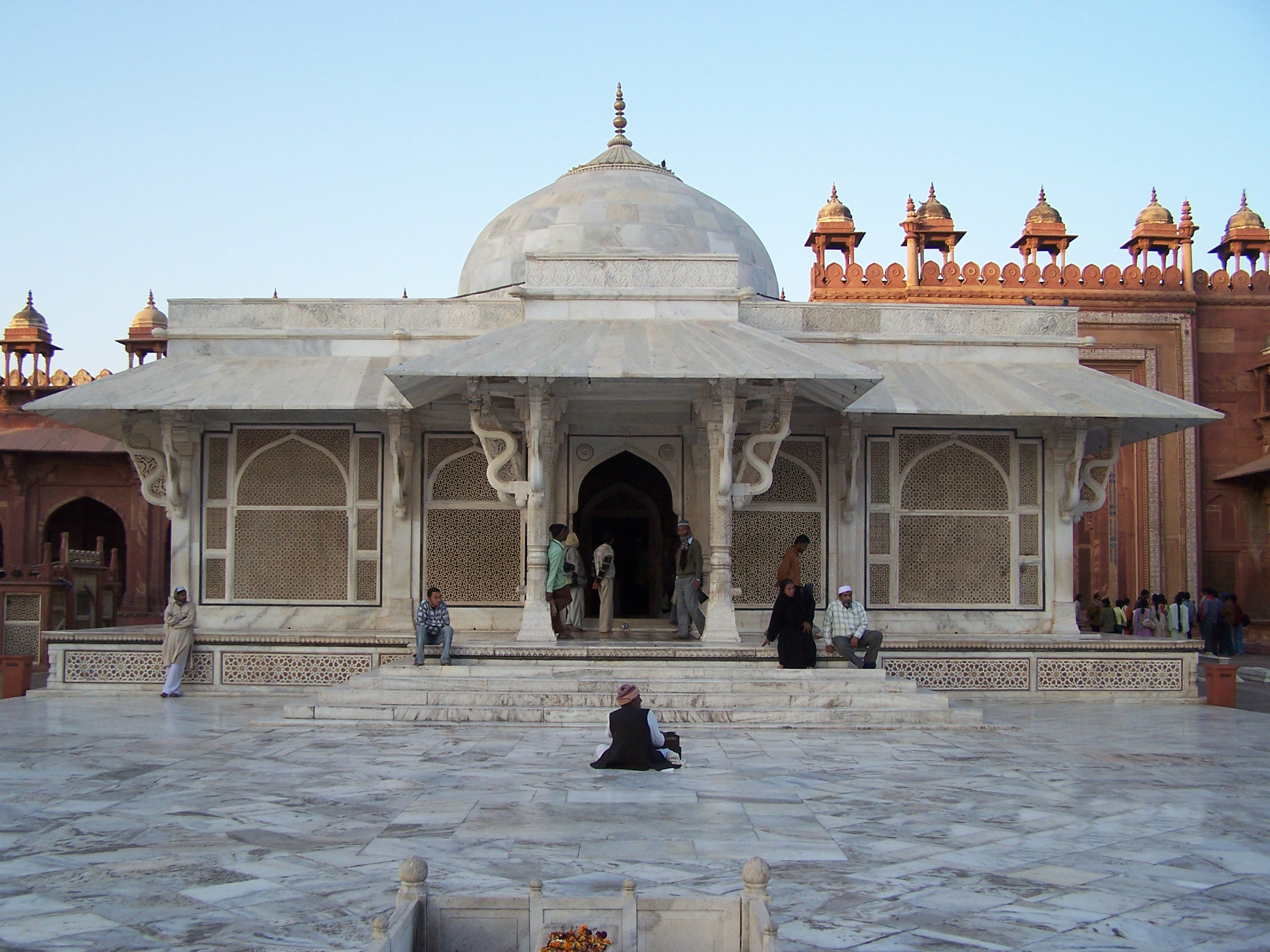
The Tomb of Salim Chisti at Fatehpur Sikri near Agra.

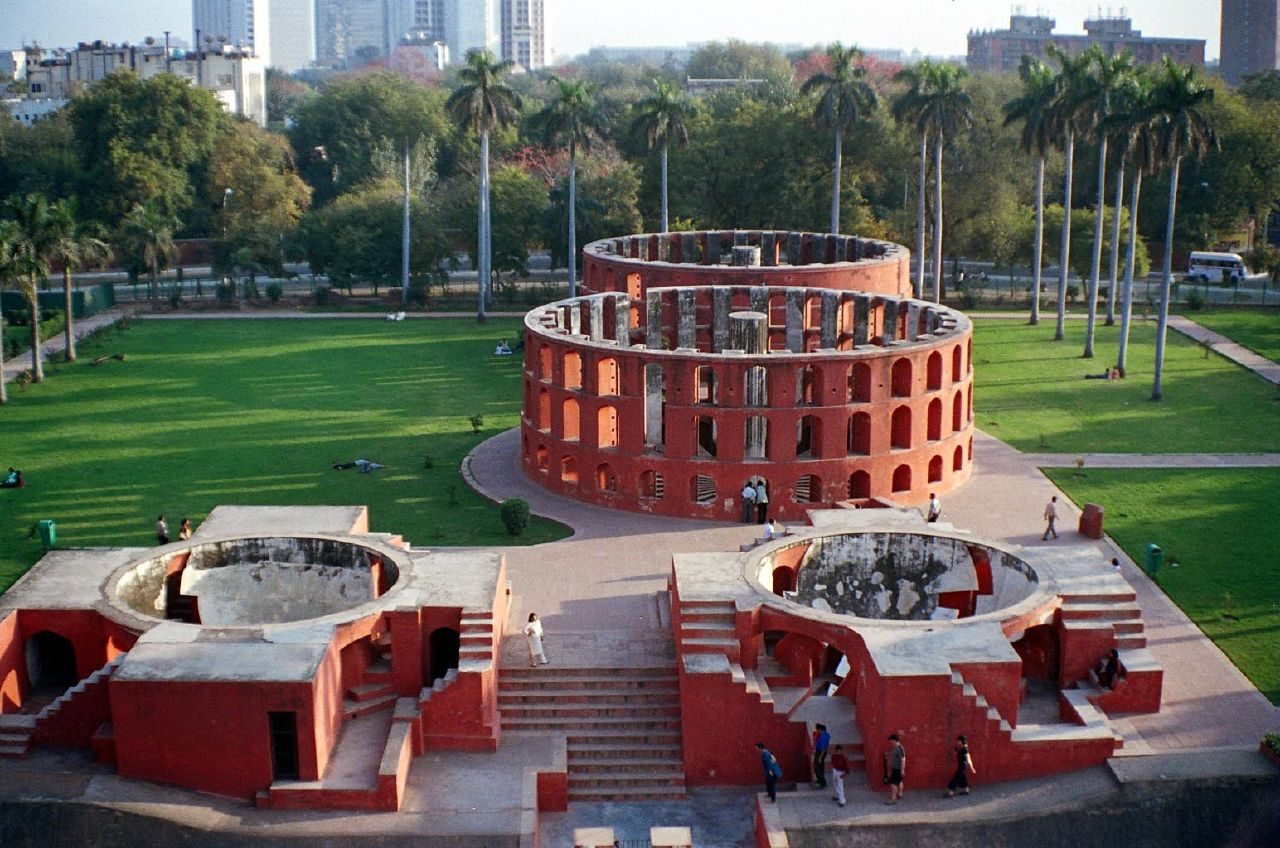
Jantar Mantar

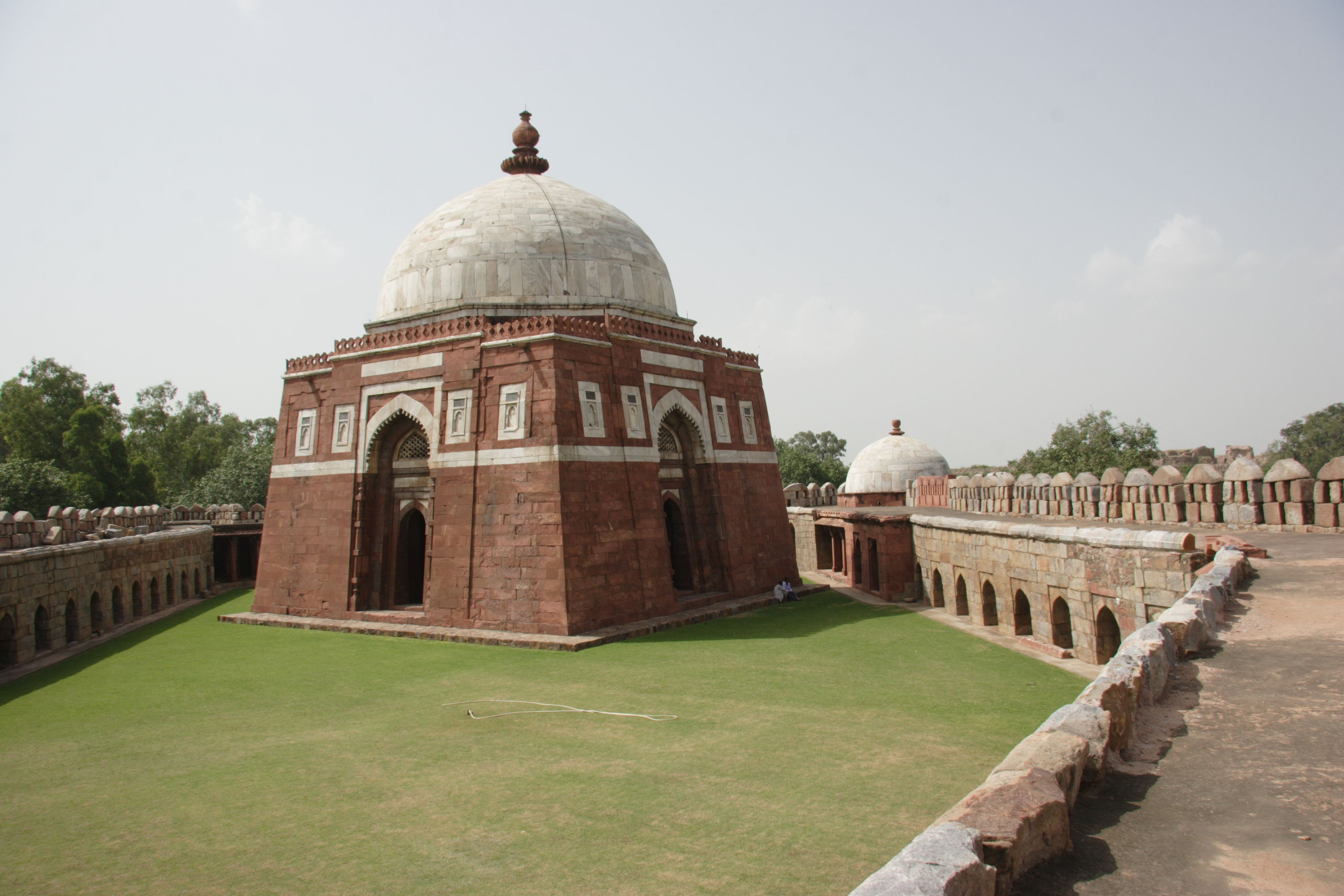
The Mausoleum of Ghiyath al-Din Tughluq at Tughlaqabad Fort.

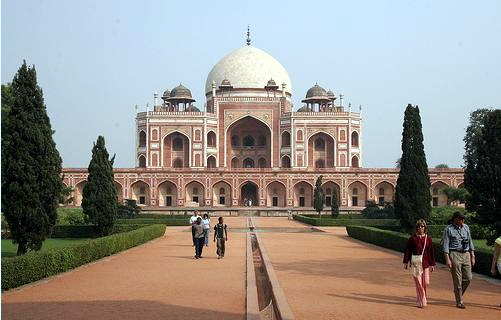
Humayun's Tomb was a model for Taj Mahal which was built from the architectural design of Humayun's Tomb.

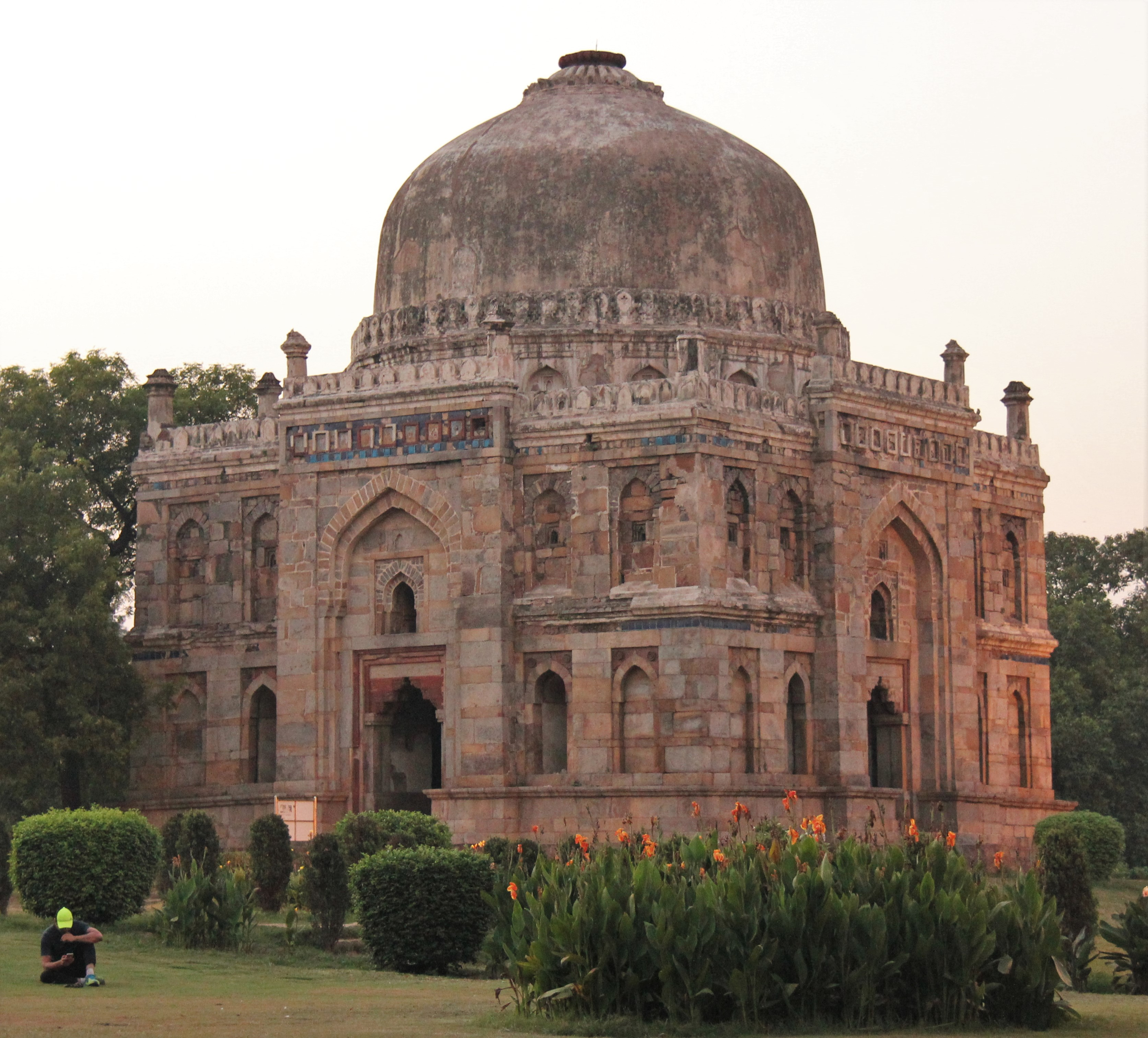
This mausoleum in the Lodi Gardens is known as the Shisha Gumbad (glass dome)

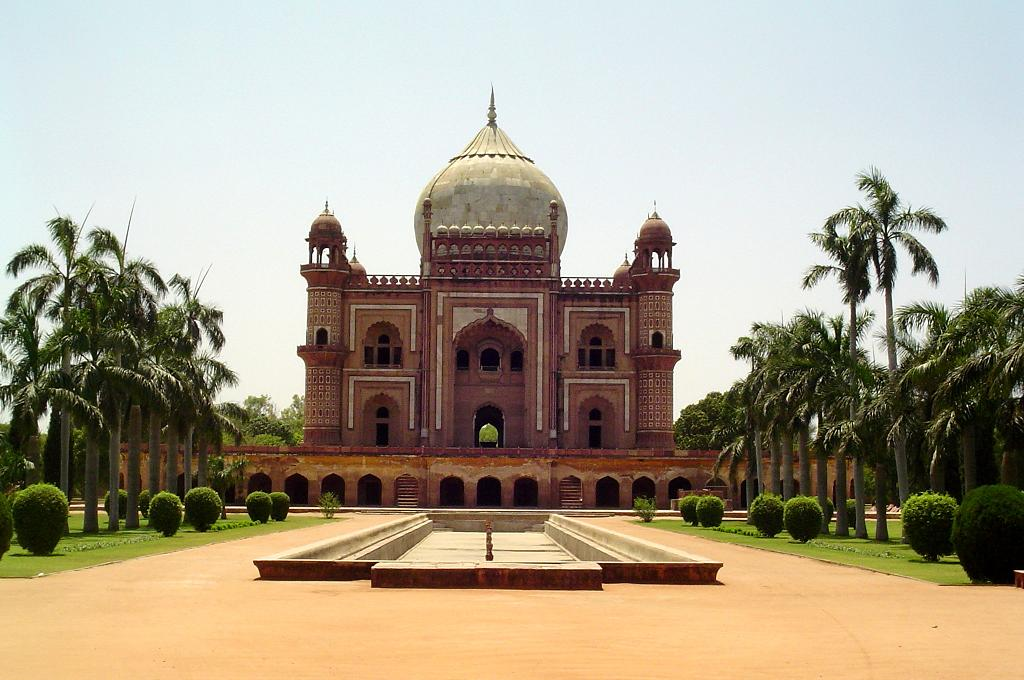
Safdarjung's Tomb is a garden tomb within a marble mausoleum.

== See also ==
- Archaeological Survey of India
- Epigraphia Indica
- State Protected Monuments of India
- List of World Heritage Sites in India
- Monuments of National Importance (India)
- Delhi Archaeological Society
- Survey of India
- Indo-Persian culture
- Mughal architecture
- Indo-Islamic architecture
- Akbar's tomb
- Red Fort
- Buland Darwaza
- Fatehpur Sikri
- Lahore Fort
- Taj Mahal
- Jama Masjid
- Bibi Ka Maqbara
- Lucknow
- Khanzada
- Ata Hussain Fani Chishti
- Chishti Order
- Indo-Persian culture
- Khwaja Maudood Chishti
- Khwaja Wali Kirani
- Mu'in al-Din Chishti
- Jahangir
- Asaf Khan
- Achabal Gardens
- Mughal Empire
- Nurmahal
- Nur Jahan
- Persian language in the Indian subcontinent
- List of Persian calligraphers
- Bara Imambara
- Chota Imambara
- Imambara Ghufran Ma'ab
- Imambara Shah Najaf
