= Shaal Pir Baba =

Shaal Pir Baba (a.k.a. Khwaja Naqruddin) was a Sufi saint who was also a leader of the Moudodi Syed's in Balochistan and Sindh, today's Pakistan.

Naqruddin Moudood Chishti migrated to Quetta 600 years ago from Chisht, today's Afghanistan and stayed near the city fort that gave the city its original name, Kwatta (mound of earth). Chishti was buried here after his death and his shrine lies close by.

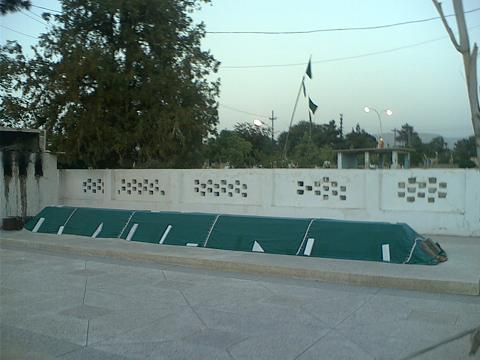
Grave of Shaal Pir Baba, 2008

== Names ==
Naqruddin got a second name "Shalpir Baba" from another of Quetta's early names, Shalkot. He was also known as "Nogazza Baba" (meaning 9 yards long), due to the length of his grave.

== Life and family ==
Naqruddin migrated from Chisht, near Herat in today's Afghanistan, to Quetta most likely during the rule of military general Timur, also known as Tamerlane (1335–1405).

His father was Nassar ud din Waleed in Chisht (727 AH-820 AH) who is buried in Chisht. One of his brothers, Ibrahim Yukpasi, is buried in Mastung Balochistan. Another brother of his, Nizam-ud-din Ali, is buried in Minziki, an area in the vicinity of Pishin city in Balochistan province of Pakistan.

His exact date of death is not known, but his brothers Khwaja Ibrahim Yukpasi and Nizamuddin Ali lived from 1359 CE to 1455 CE and 1308 CE to 1405 CE, respectively. Naqruddin fathered Khwaja Wali Kirani Moudoodi Chishti, The descendants of Khwaja are reported to have rendered services during the First Anglo-Afghan War, led by Mubarak Shah. The Chishti Syeds in the Kirani Tehsil claim these descendants as their ancestors. Khwaja Naqruddin was responsible for the later flourishing of the Moudodi Syed's in Balochistan and Sindh, India.

=== Descendants ===
Ibrahim is considered to be the father of Chishti Syed's living in Mastung, Dhadar and Katchi areas.

Khwaja Naqruddin's son Wali Kirani Moudodi Chishti Kirani was buried in Kirani, a small village in the west of Quetta valley. Almost half of the western part of Quetta was given to him as a gift. The land remains in his name in government records. It included the western part of the city from Manda Samungli to Lakpass including the mountains, going up to Mian Ghandi. Most of Wali Kirani's descendants migrated to in Balochistan and Sindh. In Balochistan his descendants settled in Sindh and are more prosperous. People from his Chishti line are living in Nawab Shah. Their forefather is believed to be Syed Imam Ali Shah. His descendants are spread throughout Tando Adam and Mirpur Khas.

=== Family tree ===
- Imam Ali ibn Abu Talib, buried at the Imam Ali Mosque in Najaf, Iraq .{March 17, 599 - February 28, 661 aged 61}
- Imam Husayn ibn Ali, buried at the Imam Husayn Shrine in Karbala, Iraq. (B4h D60h)
- Imam Hassan ibn Alial-Sajjad, Zainu l-Abidin, buried in Jannat al-Baqi Medina.(B-h D94h)
- Imam Muhammad ibn Ali al-Baqir al-Ulum Buried in Jannat al Baqi Medina.(B-h D114h)
- Imam Ja'far al-Sadiq al-Sadiq - in Jannat al-Baqi Medina.(B80h D148h)
- Imam Musa al-Kadhimal-Kazim in the Kadhimiya in Baghdad Iraq .(B128h D183h)
- Imam Ali ibn Musa ar-Rida in the Imam Reza shrine Mashad.(B153h D203h)
- Imam Muhammad ibn Ali at-Taqi al-Jawad in the Kadhimiya in Baghdad Iraq.(B195h D220h)
- Imam Ali al-Hadi an-Naqi in the Al Askari Mosque in Samarra Iraq.(B214h D254h)
- Imam Hassan al Askari in the Al Askari Mosque in Samaira Iraq. (B232h D260)
- Syed Imam Abdullah Ali Akbar bin Hasan al Askari. (B238h D292h)
- Abu Muhammed Al Hussain in Chist Hirat Afghanistan. (B---h D352h)
- Abu Abdullah Muhammed in Chisht Herat Afghanistan. (B270h D324h)
- Abu Jaffer Ibrahim in Chisht Herat Afghanistan.(B-h D370h)
- Shamsu d-Din Abu Nassar Muhammed Saman in jalanadhar India. (B-h D398h)
- Abu Yusuf Bin Saamaan in Chisht Herat Afghanistan. (B375h D459h)
- Qutubuddin Maudood Chishti in Chisht Herat Afghanistan.(B430h D527h)
- Rukunuddin Hussain Chishti in Chisht Herat Afghanistan.(B545h D635h)
- Qudwaddin Mohammad in Chisht Herat Afghanistan. (B584h D624h)
- Qutubuddin
- Aududdin Khwaha Abu Ahmed Syed Muhammed in Chisht, Herat, Afghanistan
- Taqiuddin Yusuf in Chisht Herat Afghanistan. (B662h D745h)
- Nassar ud din Waleed in Chisht Herat Afghanistan. (B727h D820h)
- Khwaja Nasratuddin alias Shaal Pir Baba Chishti Moudodi in Quetta, Cant, Balochistan, Pakistan.

== See also ==
Moudoi Chishti Kirani Quetta Balochistan Pakistan

- Maudood Chishti
- Khwaja Wali Kirani
