= Khwaja Abdullah Chishti =

16th Century Sufi

Khwaja Sayyid Abdullah Chishti
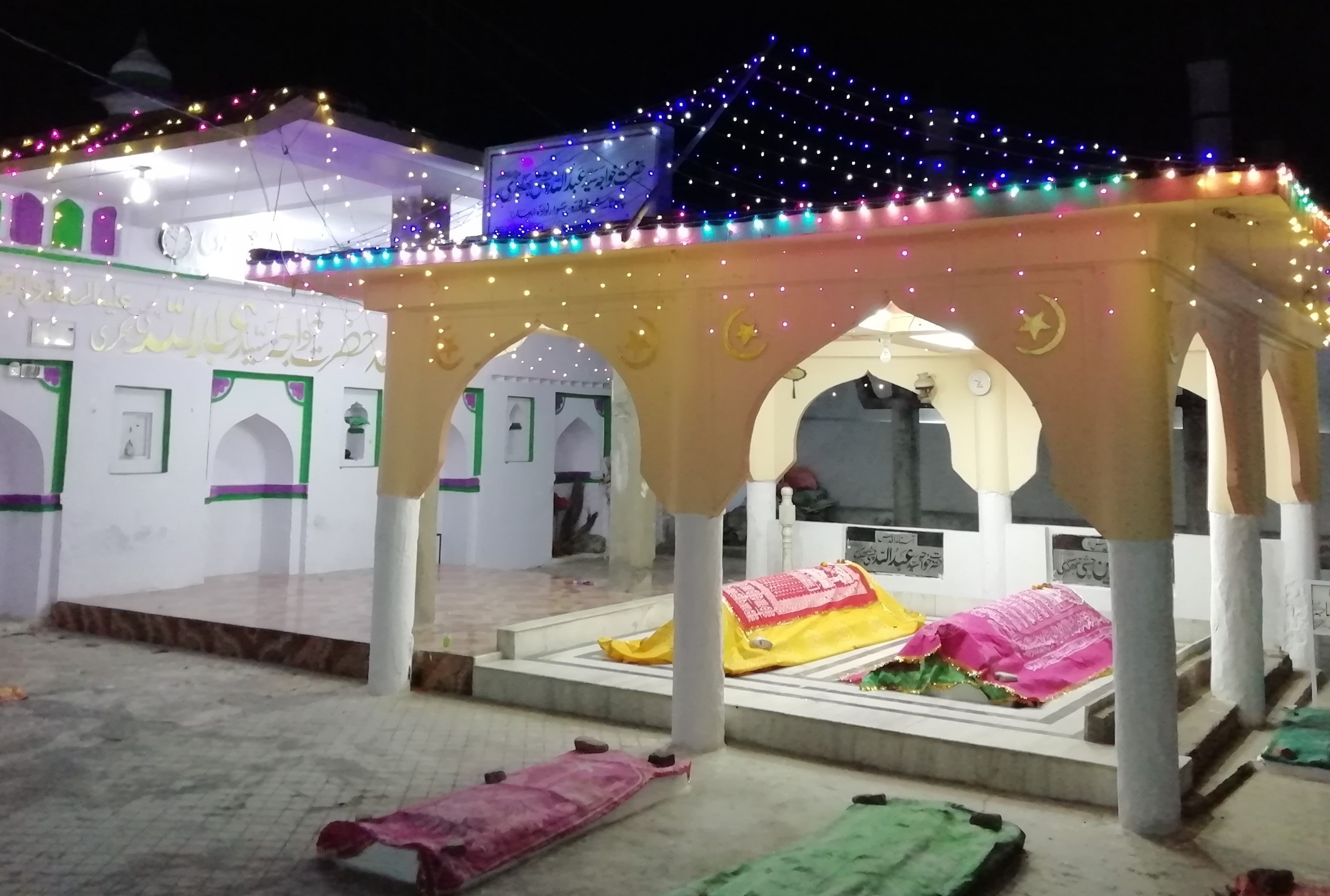
- Title: Qutb-ul-Asr, Qutb-e-Bihar, Fani Fillah, Peerzada-e-Chisht

Personal life
- Resting place: Chhota Sheikhpura, Nawada
- Children: • Khwaja Sayyid Naseeruddin Chishti رحمة الله عليه • Khwaja Sayyid Qutubuddin Sani Chishti رحمة الله عليه • Syeda Bibi Swaliha رحمةُ اللهِ عليها

Religious life
- Religion: Islam
- Order: Chishti Order
- Lineage: Hasan al-Askari رحمة الله عليه

Muslim leader
- Predecessor: Khwaja Asadullah Chishti رحمة الله عليه
- Successor: Khwaja Qutubuddin Sani Chishti رحمة الله عليه

Khwaja Sayyid Abdullah Chishti رحمة الله عليه was a 16th century Sufi Saint of Chishti order and a direct descendant of Khwajah Qutubuddin Maudood Chishti رحمة الله عليه.

== Early life ==
He was born in Old Bhakkhar, Sindh and he received his initial education from the scholars of his family.

== Name and lineage ==
His ism (given name) is Khwajah Abdullah Chishti and he was bestowed with the titles of Qutb-ul-Asr, Qutb-e-Bihar, Fani Fillah and Peerzada-e-Chisht.

=== Nasab (patronymic) ===
Khwaja Syed Abdullah Chishti bin Khwaja Syed Asadullah Chishti (Note: Khwajah Sayyad Asadullah Chishti was a prominent Sufi and Darwaesh of Chishti order. His title is Kunj Nashin. Khwajah Asadullah Chishti arrived in Bihar before his son Khwajah Abdullah Chishti and occupied himself with remembrance of God in solitude. Then he moved to Chhota Sheikhpura (Nawada, Bihar). His soul departed his mortal body on 16th of Moharram somewhere in the first half of the 16th century. His grave is located near the shrine of Hazrat Khwajah Abdullah Chishti. Khwajah Sayyad Asadullah Chishti had two sons. The elder one was Qutb ul Asr Hazrat Khwajah Sayyad Abdullah Chishti who also became the Sajjadah Nashin and younger one is Hazrat Khwajah Sayyad Ahmadullah Chishti who inhabited in Kada, Manekpur (Allahabad).) bin Khwaja Syed Burhan Uddin Chishti bin Khwaja Syed Abdur Rahman Chishti bin Khwaja Syed Mohammad Jaan Chishti (Note: He was the son of Hazrat Khwajah Sayyad Sam’aan Sani Chishti and the grandson of Khwajah Sayyad Mansoor Chishti. He was also the Khalifa and Mureed of Khwajah Qutub Uddin Bakhtiyar Kaki. Khwajah Sayyad Mohammad Jaan Chishti migrated from Chisht (Afghanistan) to Old Bhakkhar (Sindh) in the 13th century CE due to the mayhem of Mongols. During this period he met Khwajah Qutub Uddin Bakhtiyar Kaki and received Khilafat from him. After Hazrat Khwajah Sayyad Mohammad Jaan Chishti, the mantle of Khilafat was transferred to his son Khwajah Sayyad Abdur Rahman Chishti then to his son Khwajah Sayyad Burhan Uddin Chishti then to his son Khwajah Sayyad Asadullah Chishti. And from him finally the Khilafat reached Khwajah Sayyad Abdullah Chishti who also became the successor to his father.) bin Khwaja Syed Sam’aan Sani Chishti bin Khwaja Syed Mansoor Chishti bin Khwaja Syed Qutub Uddin Maudood Chishti.

== Arrival in Bihar ==
Khwaja Abdullah Chishti began his journey from Old Bhakkhar and after making pilgrimage to various Mashaikh (Note: Mashaikh is the plural of Shaikh which means master), he finally arrived at the shrine of Makhdoom Jahan Sheikh Sharf Uddin Ahmad Yahya Maneri. There he had a spiritual meeting with Makhdoom Jahan and it was revealed upon him to make Sheikhpura his permanent abode from where he would propagate the commandments of Allah.

Sayyad Shah Hussain Uddin Gayawi says:

During the period of Mughal Empire, Hazrat Khwajah Abdullah Chishti commenced his divine journey from old Bhakkhar and after receiving the blessings of various Mashaikh, he finally arrived in the province of Bihar. At the shrine of Hazrat Makhdoom ul Mulk Shah Sharf Uddin Yahya Maneri, it was revealed upon him that he is required to make his permanent abode in the proximity. And the exact location will be determined with the help of miswaak o asaa (a twig for cleaning teeth and a walking stick). Hence he stayed for a night at a place which was at a distance of about 42 km south of the shrine. In the morning after making ablution he planted the miswaak in the ground which soon turned green with the appearance of new buds. A fountain also sprang out from the ground the where he inserted his walking stick. From these miraculous sign he comprehended the prophecy and made Sheikhpura his permanent abode and then occupied himself with remembrance of God.

After the persistent stay of Khwajah Abdullah Chishti in Sheikhpura, the regional king allocated a small piece of land called Baithka on an elevated topography as a tribute. A Khanquah (Note: Whenever a Sufi visited some faroff place for spreading the message of Islam, they were often surrounded by a huge congregation of the seekers of truth. Therefore, a special quarter called Khanquah was built for the intrinsic education of the knowledge seekers. It also facilitated the pupils coming from distant places to be blessed with a prolonged companionship with their Sheikh.) and a mosque were also constructed here by Khwajah Abdullah Chishti.

=== Khwajah Kuaan ===
After the arrival of Khwajah Abdullah Chishti, a well was formed at the place from where the fountain sprang out. Hence it is named after Khwajah Abdullah Chishti and is famous in the region by the name of Khwajah Kuaan. For centuries the pilgrims of the shrine of Chishti are taking water from the well and are benefited from its healing properties. The Khwajah Kuaan is still well preserved and is located beside the main road leading to the Khanqah.

== Tasawwuf ==
Khwaja Abdullah Chishti gave Bay'ah to his father Sayyad Asadullah Chishti and was his authorized disciple who was a Sufi saint of Chishtia Nizamia order. (Note: Chishtia Nizamia order is the branch of Chishti order which was started by Nizamuddin Auliya) He also received the khilafat (Note: Authority of succession from a Peer) of Chishtia Qutubia order (Note: Chishtia Qutubia order is the branch of Chishti order which was started by Qutbuddin Bakhtiar Kaki) through his great grandfather Sayyad Mohammad Jaan Chishti who was a disciple of Khwajah Qutub Uddin Bakhtiyar Kaki.

Khwaja Abdullah Chishti authorized a number of people to be his disciples including Sayyad Qutub Uddin Sani Chishti, Sayyad Nasir Uddin Chishti and Sayyad Aashique Chishti.

== Death and legacy ==
Khwajah Abdullah Chishti died on the 14th of Rajab and his death anniversary is celebrated with great magnificence. His grave is located in Chhota Sheikhpura, Nawada, a city in Indian state of Bihar. His teachings were further spread by his descendants. His two notable descendants are mentioned below:

- Taj Mahmood Haqqani (Note: Khwajah Taj Mahmood Haqqani was grandson of Khwajah Abdullah Chishti and the 2nd Sajjadah Nashin after his father, Khwajah Qutub Sani Chishti. He is one of the most famous Sufis of Bihar. He was a contemporary of the fifth Mughal emperor Shahjahan and had close relationship with him. He went on foot to Mecca for performing Hajj. He was among the most prominent Mashaikh of Bihar under whom the spiritual education of Chishti order spread enormously.)
- Ahmad Hussain Chishti (Note: Khawaja Sayyad Ahmad Hussain Chishti was born in 1858 A.D. in Nawada, Bihar. He was a great mystic poet and a famous Sufi saint of the Chishti order in Bihar. He was also a writer, poet and spiritual teacher. He obtained the Khilafat from his father Khawaja Syed Shuja'at Hussain Chishti. He was also the disciple of noted Sufi saint, Khawaja Ata Hussain Fani Chishti. He traveled with a mission of preaching spiritual values of Islam to the people of Jharkhand and attracted thousands of followers. He had two sons, Hazrat Syed Shah Sultan Ahmad Chishti and Hazrat Syed Qasim Ahmad Chishti, the eldest of them, Hazrat Sultan Ahmad was chosen for continuing the works of his father as the Sajjadah of Khanquah e Chishtia. The soul of Hazrat Syed Ahmad Hussain Chishti finally left his mortal body on 26 November 1922 and his grave is preserved in Chhota Sheikhpura, Nawada.)

=== Family life ===
He had two sons and one daughter from one of his wife Bibi Rukn. His elder son is Khwajah Sayyad Nasir Uddin Chishti and the younger is named Khwajah Sayyad Qutub Uddin Qutub Sani Chishti. His daughter Bibi Swaleha was married to Sayyad Aashique Chishti who was also a disciple of Khwajah Abdullah Chishti.

=== List of Sajjadah Nashin ===
All the Sajjadah Nashin of this Khanqah are the direct descendant of Khwaja Abdullah Chishti. Their name are mentioned below in chronological order.

1. Sayyad Qutubuddin Sani Chishti
2. Khwaja Taj Mahmood Haqqani
3. Khwaja Sayyad Inayatullah Chishti
4. Khwaja Sayyad Fasih Chishti
5. Khwaja Sayyad Malih Chishti
6. Khwaja Sayyad Rahman Chishti
7. Khwaja Sayyad Fakhruddin Chishti
8. Khwaja Sayyad Shuja'at Hussain Chishti
9. Khwaja Sayyad Ahmad Hussain Chishti
10. Khwaja Sayyad Sultan Ahmad Chishti
11. Khwaja Sayyad Qutubuddin Ahmad Chishti
12. Mawlana Sayyad Ainuddin Chishti
