= Wali Kirani =

Muslim saint

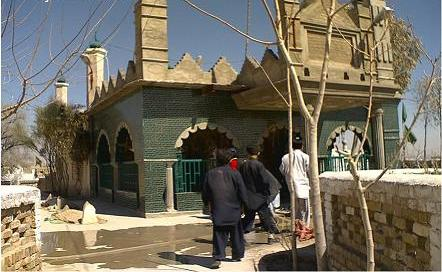
Shrine of Wali Moudoi Chishti Kirani, in Quetta, Balochistan, Pakistan (2008)

Wali Kirani (Persian: خواجه ولی مودودی چشتی کرانی, fl c.1470) was a Muslim saint. His date of birth and date of death are not known, but is believed to have lived around the time of Sultan Hussain Mirza's rule in Herat around 1470.

== Ancestors ==
=== Chishti group ===
The founder of the Chishti group was Khwaja Moudod, who was born in 1039 AD and died in 1133 AD at Chisht, a suburb of Hirat. The founder and forefather of the Moudodi branch of the Chishti order is Qutub-ud-din Maudood Chishti, who was born in Chisht, Herat, Afghanistan. Khwaja Moinuddin, who flourished in the 12th century and whose shrine is in Ajmer, was a Chishti.

The word Khwaja ("master") is used to show respect for the saints of the Chishti order.

=== Rukun-ud-din Hussain Chishti ===
Upon the death of the Sufi saint Najamuddin Ahmed Mushtaq (507–577 A.H.; 1129–1199 C.E.), the two elder sons – Baha-ud-din Muhammad and Nizam-ud-din Ali – could not decide as to who should be their father's successor while the third son – Rukun-ud-din Hussain – kept quiet. Finally the murids and Khulifa, having seen a miraculous sign, requested Rukun-ud-din to be the Sajjada nashin. His brothers also agreed, and despite his rank the Khwaja was always respectful to his brothers and gave them due regard.

In 1220 CE, Genghis Khan invaded Afghanistan and the Muslim provinces with widespread destruction, looting, and death. Rukn-ud-din had a dream in which his father warned him about the impending threat of a Tatari attack on the Herat and advised him to seek shelter elsewhere. The Khwaja migrated to Ghour along with his family. It is said that he was in the fort of Ghour when the Tartar forces surrounded and besieged the city but the Khwaja's prayers prevented their conquering and they left. In another account, the Khwaja and his two sons stayed for six months in an area called Saghir. Khwaja Rukun-ud-din then returned to Chisht but found his extended family in turmoil: the few who had not been killed were in distress. Rukunuddin Hussain brought them together and gave them hope. The Khwaja asked his son Khwaja Mohiuddin Ali to proceed to India while his other son, Khwaja Sheikh Ul Islam Qududdin Muhammad, died. He often felt grief over this separation from his sons. It is said that after Sahib's arrival at Chisht whenever an attacking army passed near Chisht, most of the soldiers converted to Islam at Rukn-ud-din's hand so that thousands converted to Islam.

He died in 635 AH at the age of 90 years.

=== Khwaja Qutub-ud-din Muhammad ===
Qutub-ud-din Muhammad Ibn-e-Muhammad Moududi Chishti was the grandson of Khwaja Rukn-ud-din Hussain. His father, Muhammad, had died when his grandfather was still alive so he assumed the position of Sajjada nashin after his grandfather's death. He wrote to his uncle Ali to return from India and offered him the seat but the latter declined to come back.

Khwaja Qutub-ud-din belonged to the same era as Genghis Khan's nephew Hulagu Khan. After Genghis's death, his sons and many of his followers converted to Islam. Many of them became followers of Qutub-ud-din Muhammad. He gave them advice and explained to them the religion of Islam and responsibilities of being a Muslim. After the Tatari assault on Herat in 1221 A.C. many of the residents of Chisht and followers and relatives of Qutubuddin had permanently fled to other areas like Ghour, Ghazni, and Khurrassan (Ref Book: Mohammad Ibrahim Yukpasi by Dr. Tahir Taunsvi). However, the Mongols who had converted to Islam revered Khwaja Qutub-ud-din. Their ruler declared safe passage to anyone who wanted to return to Chisht and agreed to follow Qutub-ud-din, and he issued an order that none should be harmed in the vicinity of where the Khwaja lived. As a result, a large number of people came back to Chisht and settled in peace under the guidance of Qutub-ud-din Muhammad.

He died in 680 AH and was buried at Chisht.

=== Khwaja Naqr-ud-din ===
Wali Kirani's father was Khwaja Naqr-ud-din and is a Sufi saint in his own right. In this book Khwaja Wali's father's name is mentioned as "Khwaja Nasir-ud-din," but according to the hereditary Shijra of the Syeds of Kirani, it is "Khwaja Naqr_ud_din Shaal Pir Baba". Khwaja Naqr-ud-din's father's name was Khwaja Nasir_ud_din Waleed (born 1326 AC – died 1417 AC); his shrine is in Chisht Sharif.

Khwaja Naqr-ud-din and with his two brothers migrated from Chisht Herat about 600 years ago. Before 1470, Quetta (Shal) was a territory of Herat under the rule of Sultan Hussain Mirza, who subsequently conferred the territories of Shal, Pushang and Sibi on Amir Shuja-ud-din Zunnun, the Arghun. Because Quetta was called Shal at the time Khwaja Naqr-ud-din lived there, he is also known as "Shal Piran". The three brothers migrated to Minziki Pishin. One brother, Khwaja Ali, took permanent residence there, and his tomb remains in Minziki. (A few families live in the Manzakai in the Pishin Tahsil, where they were given the proprietary right in a sixth share of their land by "Alizai Tarins".) However, Khwaja Naqr-ud-din continued ahead to Quetta and settled there. His shrine is near the old Quetta fort, within the cantonment limits between the fort and the Leytton Road; the shrine is held in great esteem among the locals and the Tribes of Balochistan. The third brother, Khwaja Ibrahim, continued ahead and settled in Mastung; his tomb is in Mastung, Balochistan.

=== Family tree ===
Ancestry of Moudoi Chishti Kirani

1. Imam Ali ibn Abu Talib, buried at the Imam Ali Mosque in Najaf, Iraq (B 17 March 599 – D 28 February 661; aged 61)
2. Imam Husayn ibn Ali, buried at the Imam Husayn Shrine in Karbala, Iraq (B 4h – D 60h)
3. Imam Ali ibn Hussain -Sajjad, Zainu l-Abidin, buried at Jannat al-Baqi in Medina, Saudi Arabia (B 38h – D 94h)
4. Imam Muhammad ibn Ali al-Baqir al-Ulum, buried at Jannat al Baqi in Medina, Saudi Arabia (B 57h – D 114h)
5. Imam Ja'far al-Sadiq al-Sadiq – at Jannat al-Baqi in Medina, Saudi Arabia (B 80h – D 148h)
6. Imam Musa al-Kadhimal-Kazim in the Kadhimiya in Baghdad, Iraq (B 128h – D 183h)
7. Imam Ali ibn Musa ar-Rida in the Imam Reza shrine, Mashad, Iran (B 153h – D 203h)
8. Imam Muhammad ibn Ali at-Taqi al-Jawad in the Kadhimiya in Baghdad, Iraq (B 195h – D 220h)
9. Imam Ali al-Hadi an-Naqi in the Al Askari Mosque in Samarra, Iraq (B 214h – D 254h)
10. Imam Hassan Al Askari in the Al Askari Mosque in Samarra, Iraq ( B 232h - D 260)
11. Abdullah Ali Akbar (B 238h – D 292h) bin Hasan al-Askari
12. Abu Muhammed Al Hussain in Chist Hirat, Afghanistan (B ?h – D 352h)
13. Abu Abdullah Muhammed in Chisht Herat, Afghanistan (B 270h – D 324h)
14. Abu Jaffer Ibrahim in Chisht Herat, Afghanistan (B ?h – D 370h)
15. Shamsu d-Din Abu Nassar Muhammed Saman in Chisht Herat, Afghanistan (B ?h – D 398h)
16. Abu Yusuf Bin Saamaan in Chisht Herat, Afghanistan (B 375h – D 459h)
17. Qutubuddin Maudood Chishti in Chisht Herat, Afghanistan (B 430h – D 527h)
18. Khwaja Najamuddin Ahmed Mushtaq in Chisht Herat, Afghanistan (B 492h – D 577h)
19. Rukn-ud-din Hussain Chishti in Chisht Herat, Afghanistan (B 545h – D 635h)
20. Qudwaddin Mohammad in Chisht Herat, Afghanistan (B 584h – D 624h)
21. Aududdin Khwaha Abu Ahmed Syed Muhammed in Chisht, Herat, Afghanistan
22. Taqiuddin Yusuf in Chisht Herat, Afghanistan (B 662h – D 745h)
23. Nassar ud din Waleed in Chisht Herat, Afghanistan (B 727h – D 820h)
24. Shaal Pir Baba Chishti Moudodi in Quetta, Chaowni, Balochistan, Pakistan
25. Wali Kirani Moudodi Chishti in Kirani, Quetta, Balochistan, Pakistan

== Life ==
Wali Kirani was born during the time Naqr-ud-din lived in Quetta, although his date and year of birth are not known. Wali Kirani is a Husseini Syed and was from the line of Imam Ali Naqi's (the 10th imam) son, Imam Hasan al-Askari and his second son Sayyid Ali Akbar . He was a descendant of Khwaja Maudood Chishti and because of this was known as "Moudodi Chishti."

Wali Kirani Moudodi settled in Kirani.

== Tomb ==
Initially the building of Sahib's tomb was made of mud.

Before 1970 Sadat of Kirani had a brick and concrete boundary wall built and a main gate installed. After that in 1973, the then-prime minister Mr Zulfikar Ali Bhutto (Shaheed) provided the money for the tomb's renovation. Further improvements were made in 2006.

In 2008, due to alarming increase in population in the immediate vicinity of the tomb, there was the danger of desecration of the tomb and the adjoining 600-year-old graveyard of the Sadat of Kirani. Therefore, the Government of Balochistan built a fortified boundary wall around the tomb as well as the graveyard. Chief Minister of Balochistan Mr. Nawab Mohammed Aslam Raisani signed a grant of Rs. 5 million for this project; his father, the late Mr. Nawab Ghous Bakhsh Rayesani, was also a close ally of the Sadat of Kirani. Another person who played an important role in the construction of this boundary wall was Mr. Mir Haji Ali Mudad Jatak, the Minister for Food, Balochistan. This project was possible because of his relentless efforts.

== Descendants ==
=== Migration ===
Most of Wali Kirani's descendants have migrated to various areas in what is now Pakistan. In Balochistan his descendants have settled in Sindh and are more prosperous. There are people from his Chishti line living in Nawab Shah; their forefather is believed to be Syed Imam Shah, who is also Wali Kirani's descendant. In the same way his descendants are spread throughout Tando Adam and Mirpur Khas.

=== Kirani ===
The Chishti Syeds of Kirani in the Quetta Tahsil claim Khwaja Naqr-ud-din (Shaal Pir Baba, or Shal Piran) as their ancestor.

Kirani is a small village on the western outskirts of Quetta in the Baluchistan province of Pakistan. It was previously known as Shal Kot, the capital of the province. Initially the predominant population was descendants of Wali Kirani Chishti, along with some Baluchistan and Pathans who worked on their lands. At the time this area was green and lush and there were fruit orchards of all kinds that were irrigated by the local rivers. An abundance of forests and wildlife was there. The locals had to ask for permission from Wali Kirani's descendants in order to gather firewood from their lands. At the time most Balochi tribes were Bedouins who raised goats and sheep for a living. Slowly people spread their resources and took to selling wood that they cut from the forest. Many of these people made permanent houses for themselves on the uninhabited lands and started paying rent to the owners. Because there was lack of manpower and the land was only used in the rainy season, the owners had no qualms about the arrangement. But after a few decades these people filed for partial ownership of the land and occupied them permanently. As the Sadat population grew, land was distributed among their descendants; some families ended up with insufficient land to live on so they migrated to other areas. In this way the influence of non-Sadat increased in the area and many villages were formed. People took over thousands of acres of barren land. Today the Sadat are only limited to their own village; most have sold their lands and left the area.

Syed Lutuf ullah shah, who was seventh in descent from Khwaja Naqr-ud-din Shah, accompanied Mir Nasir Khan 1 of Kalat (1749–1817) to Persia and was rewarded on his return with the revenue-free holdings of Chashma Shiekh Manda and Sadiq Karez in the Quetta tahsil and with two "angusht" of water at Dhader. The latter is now held by another branch of the family.

Syeds are said to have rendered some service during the First Afghan War (1839–1842), their leading man being named Mubarak Shah. The principal men among the Sadat of Kirani received allowances from the Levy Service.

Syeds of Kirani were instrumental in British communications during the Second Afghan War in 1878. British forces under Colonel Robert Sandeman could not get news from Kandahar, because the route was so deadly that messengers refused to traverse it. When consulted, the local sardars opined that the news could not be brought by any person other than the Syeds of Kirani because they had been wakeels (agents) of the Kabul courts since time immemorial. Colonel Sandeman therefore asked Mir Samunder Shah, Mir Jehan Shah, and Mir Aurang Shah – all of whom were motabars of Kirani – to bring the news from Kandahar. They readily undertook the mission and brought the news tidings regularly. A monthly sum of Rs. 300 was fixed for the services of Syed Aurang Shah and four other Syeds of Kirani; this was converted to a sum of Rs. 130 or 138 monthly for Syeds when the British forces returned and the country was reconciled. Syed Samander Shah and Jahan Shah died in November 1889, and their allowances were discontinued for a time. The Rs. 50 allowance payable to Aurang Shah was continued to his son, Syed Bahar Shah, and was paid through the political agent, Kalat, since October 1899. The question of the distribution of the remaining Rs. 80 was referred to jirga in September 1890, and as a result of its recommendation, the payment of Rs. 45 was sanctioned to certain members of Ata ullah Shah's family, and Rs. 35 to Amin ullah Shah's family.

Kirani also became home to a large number of Hazara people, who came to Pakistan as refugees during the Soviet Union's invasion of Afghanistan (1979–1989). They settled at Killi Kirani Quetta, famous for the tomb of Wali.

=== Quetta ===
When British control of Quetta was established, it was turned into an army garrison. Today where the Command and Staff College stands in Quetta, at that very place, was a fort called "Fort Durrani". When the British chose Quetta to be a military garrison, they bought this fort from the Durranis. In 1905 Asia's largest military academy staff college was established in Quetta and the Durranis were removed from the land. Therefore, Ghullam Sarver Khan Durrani s/o Sardar Saeed Khan Durrani bought a very large piece of land from Syed Mohammad Ashraf Shah s/o Syed Mohammad Sadiq Shah adjacent to killi Kirani Quetta and formed a village there called killi Gulzar. It is still present today and its record is present in land review records.

In 1908, a Kirani Moudodi Chishti Syed family sold land in western Quetta to Haji Nasir Ali, who built housing there. The scheme attracted ethnic Hazara people, and the area became known as Hazara Town.

== Gallery ==
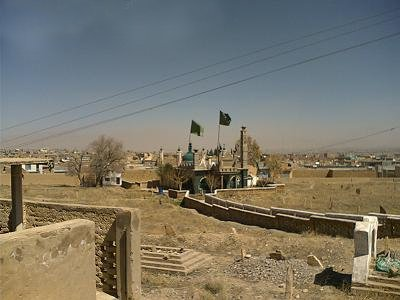
Approach to tomb complex of Wali Moudoi Chishti in Kirani (2008)

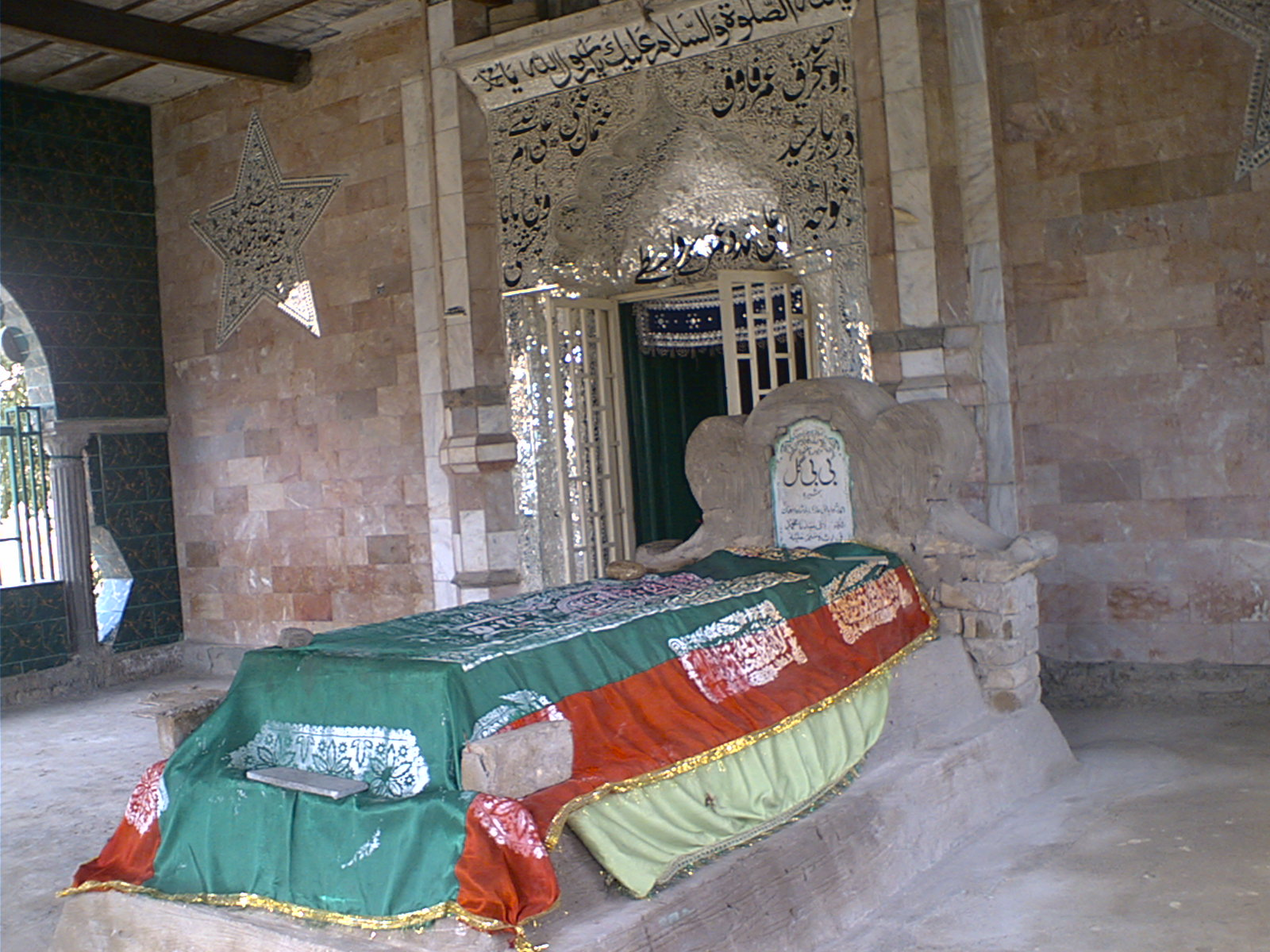
Grave of Ahmed Shah Abdali's sister at the courtyard of Wali Kirani's shrine

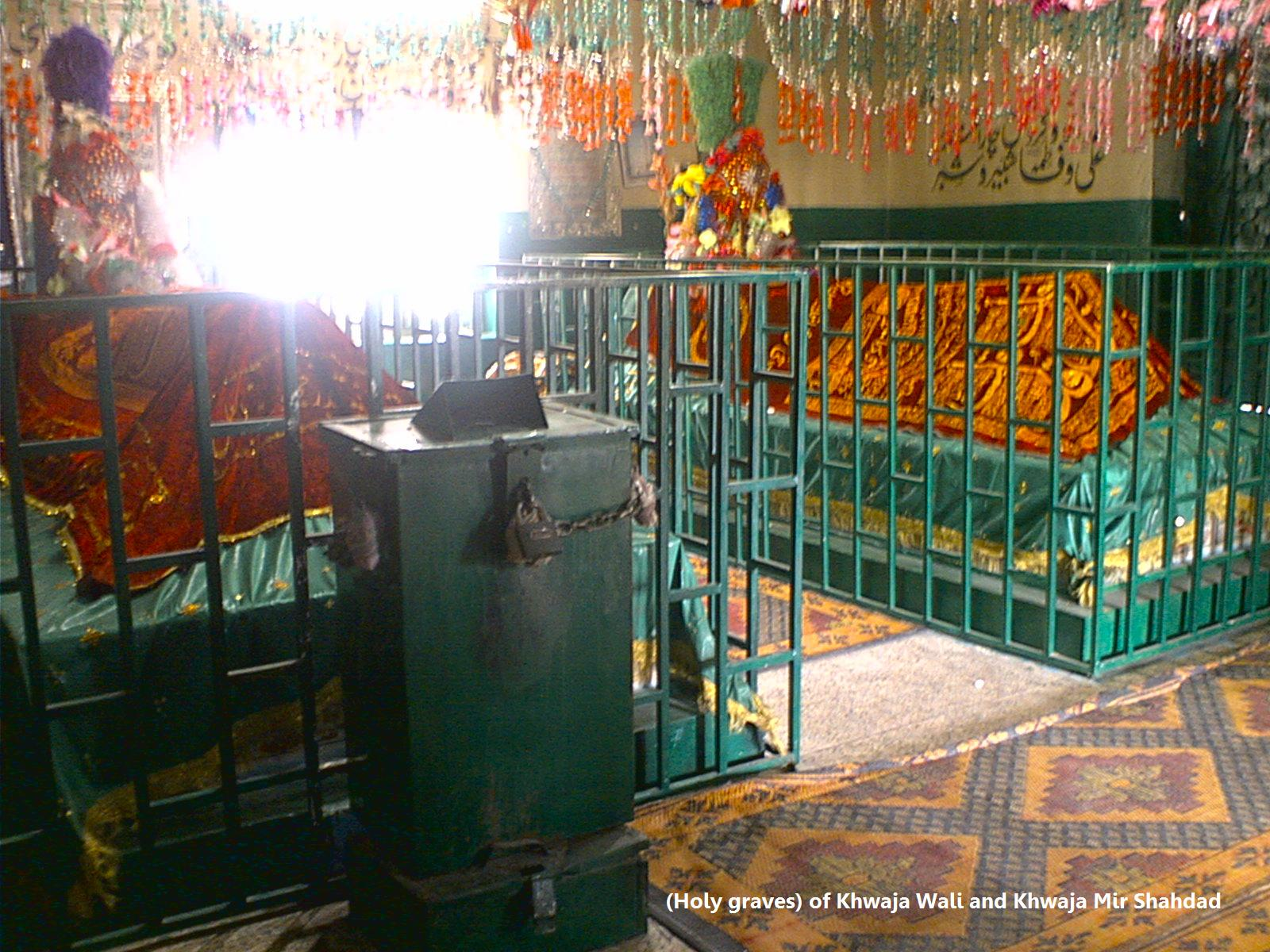
Interior of the shrine: Khwaja Wali Kirani's and Mir Shahdad's tombs

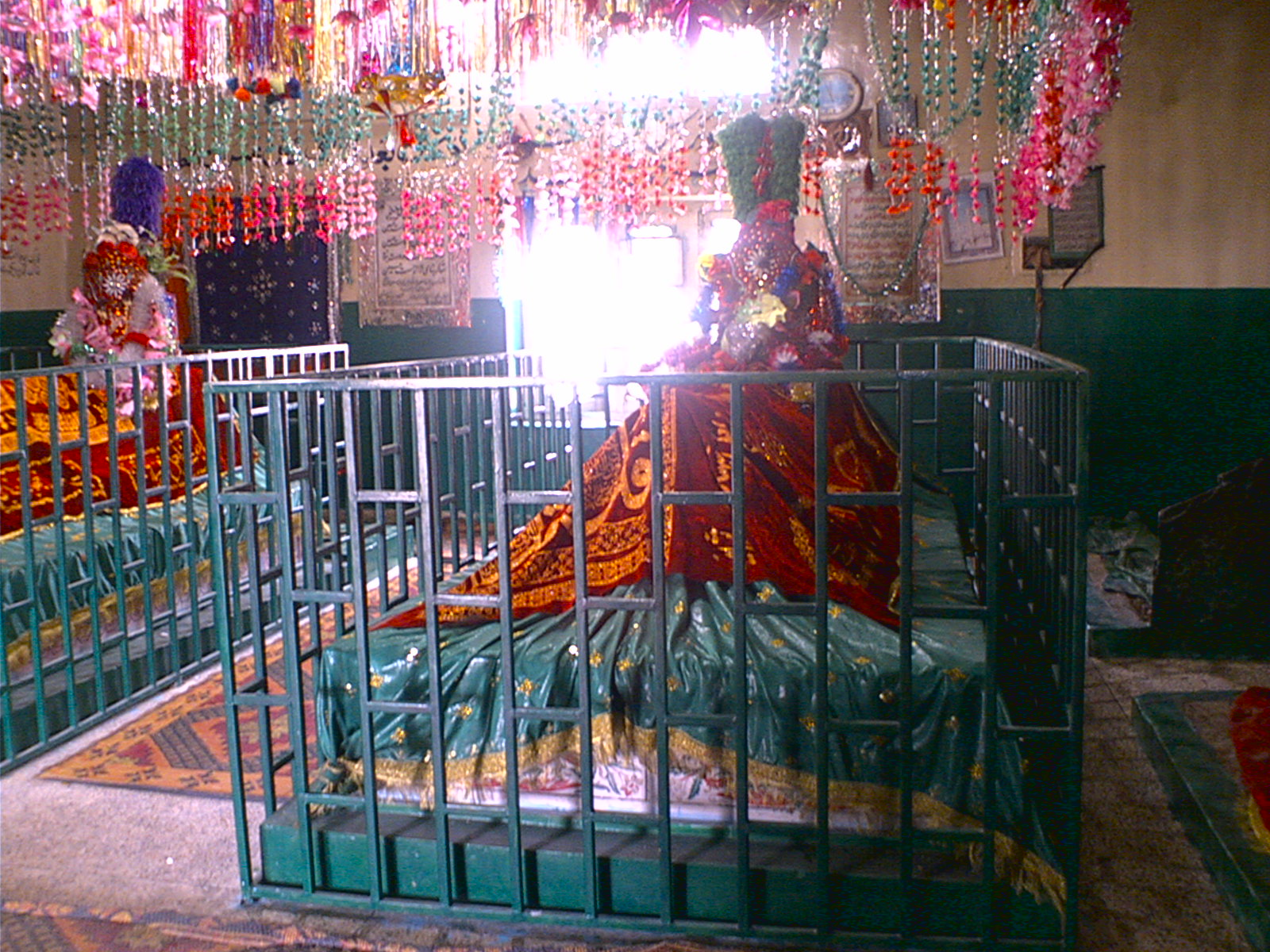
Another view of the tombs

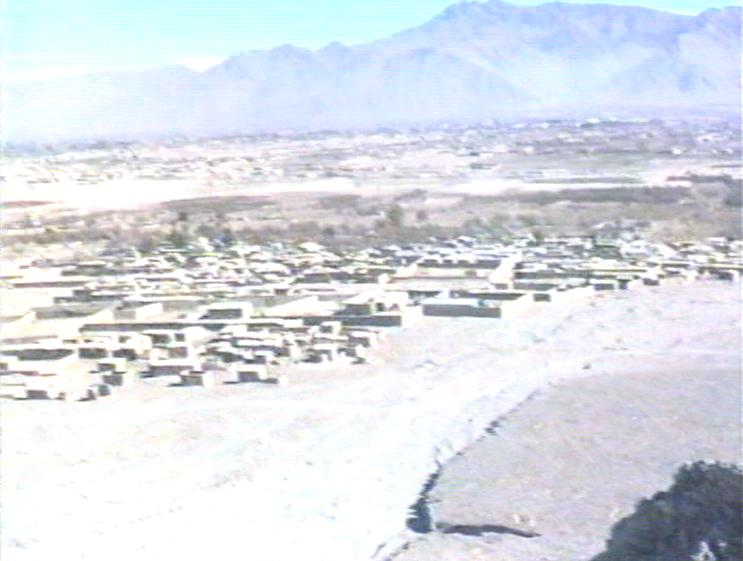
Old panorama of Kirani (1985)

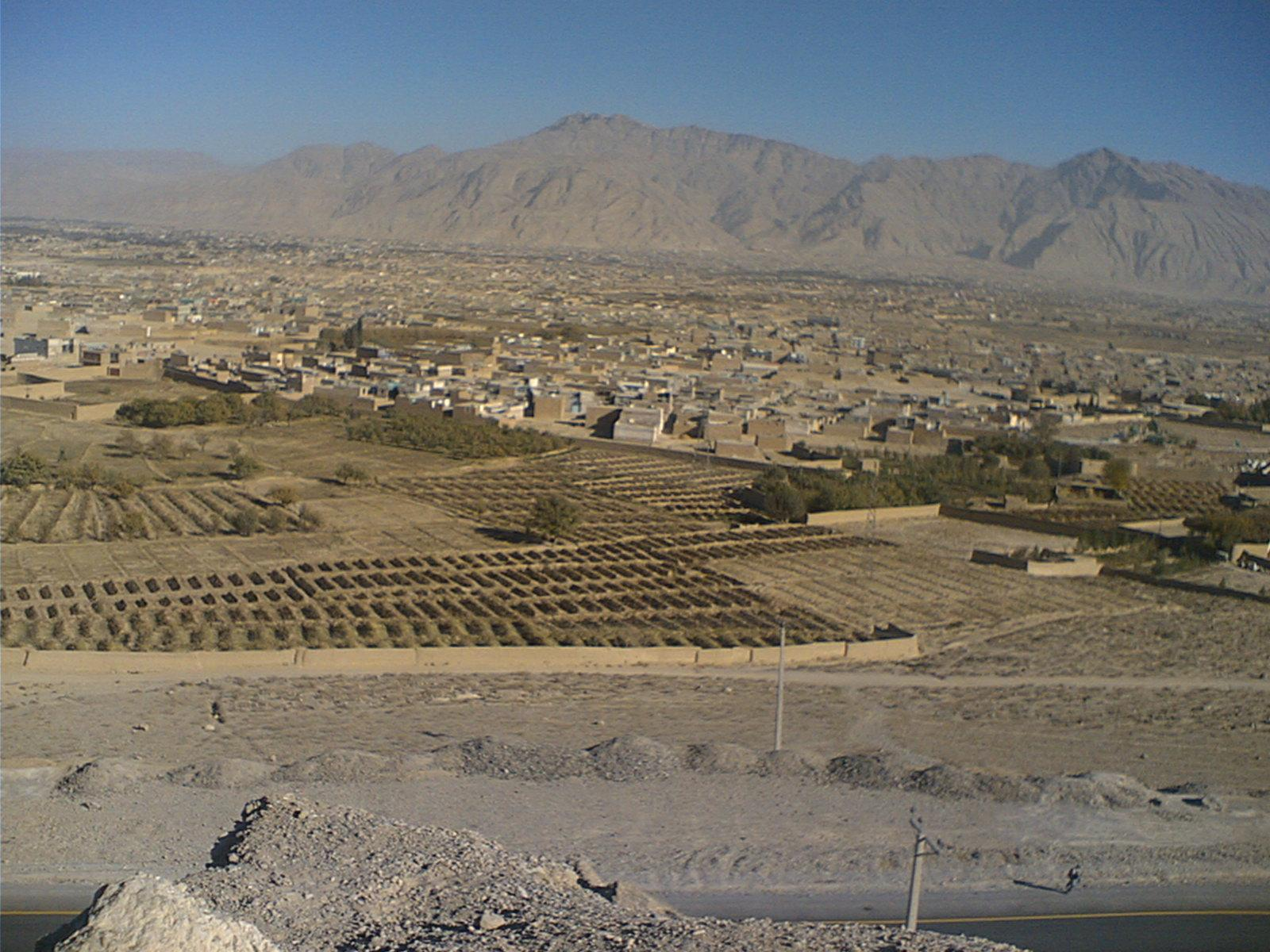
New panorama of Kirani (2008)

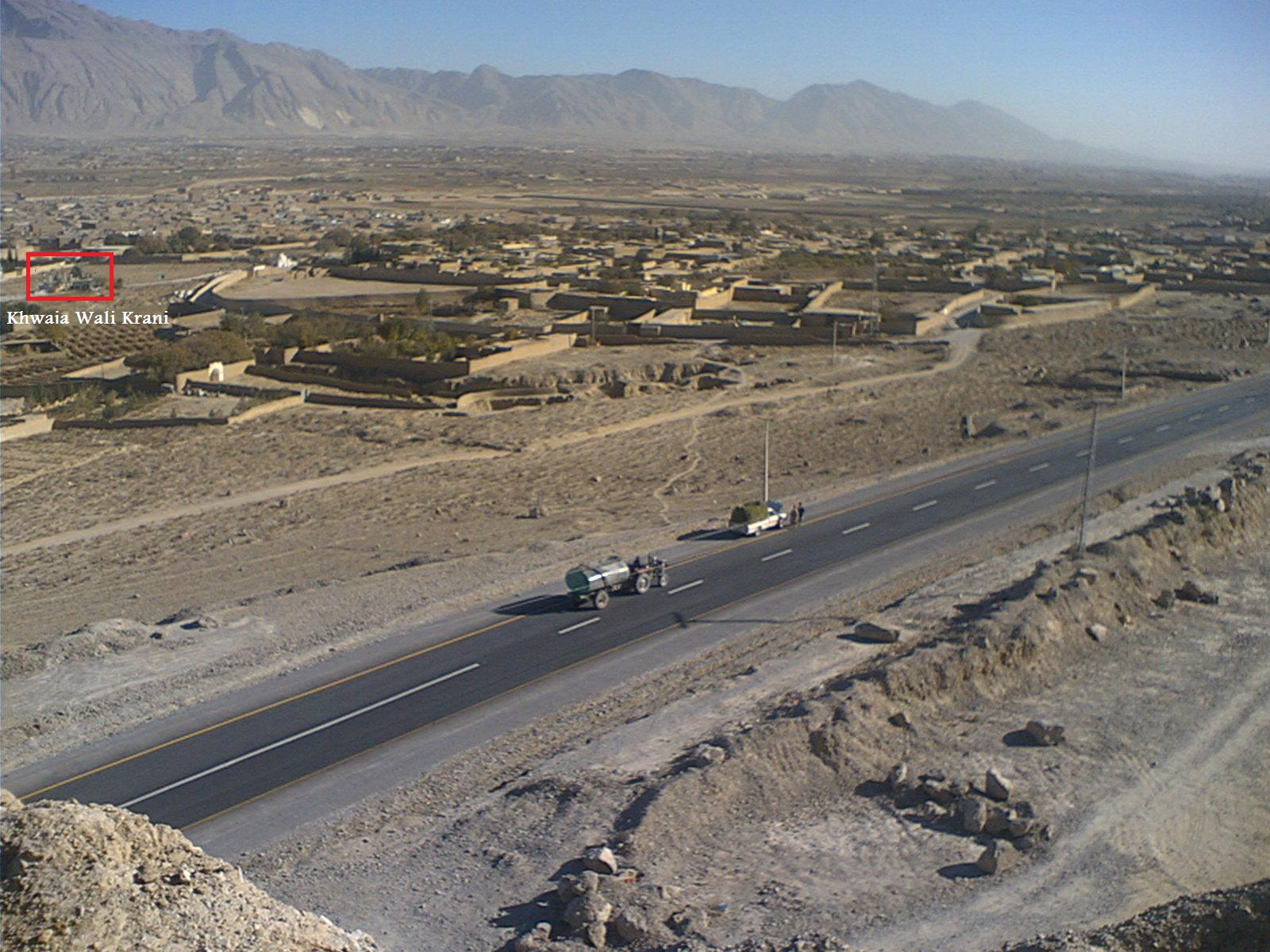
Panorama of Kirani (2008), with red box showing Khwaja Wali Kirani's tomb

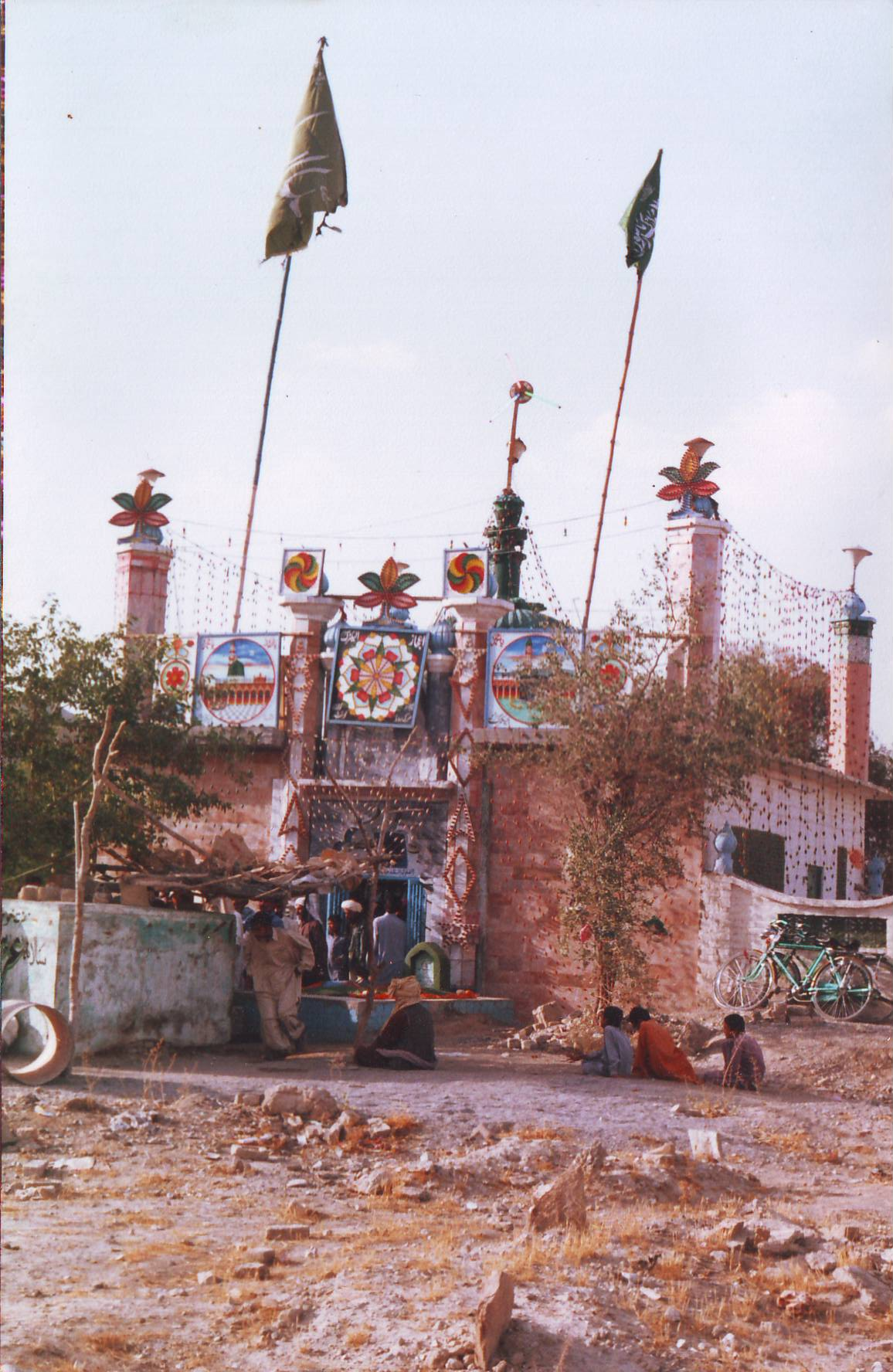
Exterior of Wali Kirani shrine (1999)

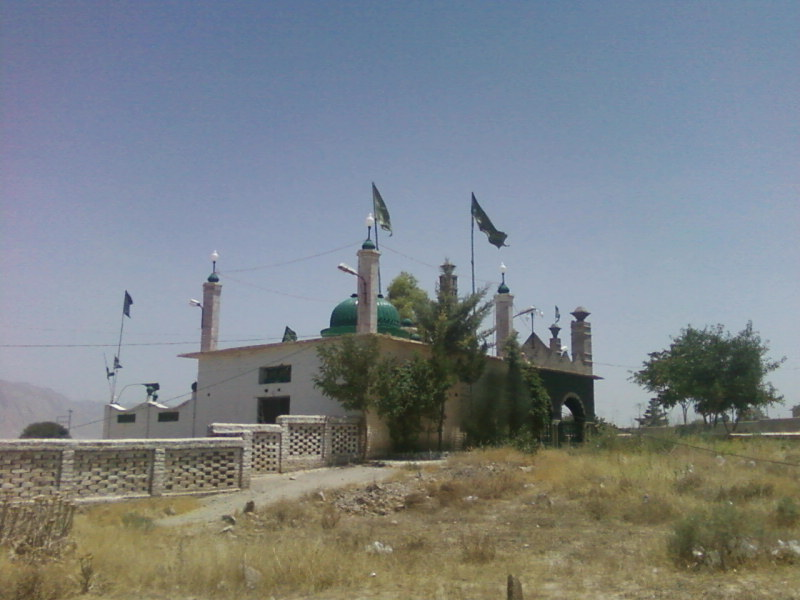
Exterior: front of Khwaja Wali Kirani's tomb (2009)

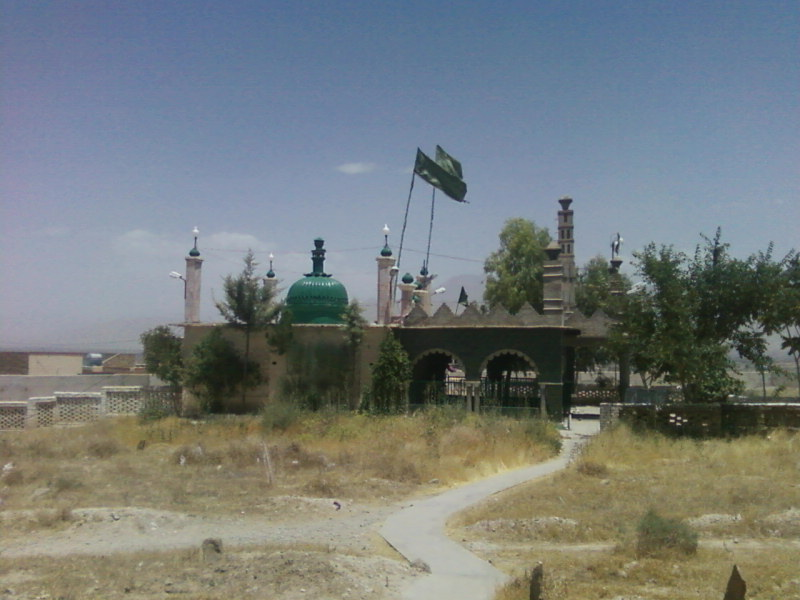
Exterior: side of Khwaja Wali Kirani's tomb (2009)

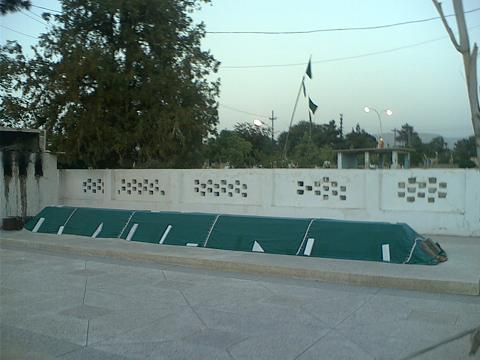
Shrine of Khwaja Naqr-ud-din Shaal Pir Baba in Quetta, 2008

== See also ==
- List of mausolea and shrines in Pakistan
- Sufism
