= Shareef Zandani =

Indian Sufi Saint

Personal life
- Born: 1098
- Died: November 10, 1215 (aged 116–117); Kannauj, Uttar Pradesh, India

Religious life
- Religion: Islam
- Order: Chishti Order
- School: Hanafi

Muslim leader
- Influenced by: Maudood Chishti
- Influenced: Usman Harooni

Shareef Zandani (1098 – 10 November 1215), also known as Nooruddin, was a Sufi saint in India. He was a successor to Maudood Chishti, 13th link in the Sufi silsila of the Chishti Order, and the peer of Usman Harooni.

He was born c. 1098 in a city called Zandanah in Iraq and died on 10 November 1215. He is buried in Kannauj, Uttar Pradesh, India.

== Spiritual Lineage ==
The traditional silsila (spiritual lineage) of the Chishti order is as follows

1. Al-Ḥasan al-Baṣrī (d. 728, an early Persian Muslim theologian)
2. 'Abdul Wāḥid Bin Zaid Abul Faḍl (d. 793, an early Sufi saint)
3. Fuḍayll ibn 'Iyāḍ Bin Mas'ūd Bin Bishr al-Tamīmī
4. Ibrāhīm bin Adham (a legendary early Sufi ascetic)
5. Ḥudhayfah al-Mar'ashī
6. Amīnuddīn Abū Ḥubayrah al-Baṣrī
7. Mumshād Dīnwarī Al Alawi
8. Abu Ishaq Shami chishti (d. 940, founder of the Chishti order proper)
9. Abu Abdaal Chishtī
10. Naseruddin Abu Muhammad Chishtī
11. Abu Yusuf Nasar-ud-Din Chishtī (d. 1067)
12. Qutab-ud-Din Maudood Chishtī (Abu Yusuf's son, d. 1139)
13. Haji Sharif Zindani (d. 1215CE, 612H)

== Sources ==
- Haji Shareef. Chishtysabiree.com.
