= Ata Hussain Fani Chishti =

South Asian Sufi saint (1816–1893)

Personal life
- Born: 1816 Moghalpura, Patna City, Bihar
- Died: 1893 (aged 76–77) Gaya, Bihar
- Other names: Khwaja-e-Bihar, Shah-e-Ata, Qutb-e-Gaya, Murshid-e-Ala, Hazrat-e-Fani

Religious life
- Religion: Islam
- Denomination: Sunni
- Jurisprudence: Hanafi
- Tariqa: Chishti
- Creed: Maturidi
- Profession: Islamic Preacher, Sufi

Muslim leader
- Predecessor: Syed Shah Ghulam Hussain Danapuri
- Successor: Syed Shah Nezamuddin Chishti Monami
- Influenced by: Abdul Qadir Jilani, Baba Farid, Nizamuddin Auliya, Sharfuddin Yahya Maneri

Syed Shah Ata Hussain Fani Chishti (1816–1893), popularly known as Khwaja-e-Bihar was an Indian Sufi saint of the Chisti Order. He was the first Sufi to go into the completely non-Muslim locality of Gaya and spread Islam. He was also a writer, poet, linguist, and orator. He died as the Ghaus, which is the highest degree of spirituality a Sufi could attain in his time.

== Biography ==
Chishti was born as Syed Shah Abdul Razzak in 1816 into a family of saints of the Chishti Order at the home of his maternal grandfather, Khanqah Qadiriyya Mannaniyya, in Patna City, Bihar, India. He was raised by his father Sultan Ahmed Shaheed until he was 10 years old. After his father's death, his paternal grandfather Ghulam Hussain Danapuri raised him before dying at the age of 86, 9 years after being made the successor of the ancestral Khanqah. After his grandfather's death, Fani was nurtured by his maternal uncle Meer Qamruddin Husain Monami, with whom completed his worldly studies and spiritual teachings. Fani was awarded Ijazah by him upon completion.

Fani was a claimed descendant of Muhammad al-Baqir.

=== Final settlement ===
Chishti travelled to Mecca by foot when he was 28. The journey took a total of 5 years. He was allegedly ordered by Muhammad spiritually to go back to India to spread Islam and accept the responsibility as a Qutub of Gaya where he lived, died, and was buried. He reached Gaya in 1850 and arrived at the house of the district judge of Gaya, Syed Ashraf Hussain.

== Spiritual history ==
He had ijaza of approximately seventy of the major orders of the world, including the famous orders of eastern India. He had orders from the fourteen major orders leading to Muhammad by all the major branches of the respective orders. He was originally in the Chistia Khizria Munemia order and completed his Sulook in Abul Ulai order (of Syedna Ameer Abul Ula) from his uncle Syed Shah Qamruddin Munemi. He also had spiritual connections with Abdul Qadir Jilani, Baba Farid, Nizamuddin Auliya and Sharfuddin Yahya Maneri.

=== Titles ===
The most important of all the titles given to him is Abdul Razzaq by Muhammad when he went to Medina and was produced in front of Muhammad's court. Other titles are:

- Shah-e-Ata
- Qutb-e-Gaya
- Murshid-e-Aala
- Sarkar-e-Ata
- Hazrat-e-Fani

== Descendants ==
Chishti married a descendant of Sharfuddin Yahya Maneri of Bihar Sharif. He had three children: one son and two daughters out of which only two carried the lineage forward. His son was Syed Shah Ghulam Qutubuddin Chishti. The succession of the Sajjada nashin of his ancestral Khanqah has always been in his son's descendants. Only his son had the authority to offer the duties of the Sajjada nashin in his absence. Shah Qutubuddin Chishti was Fani's grandson. When he died his son became Fani's successor and since then the Sajjada nashin remained with the descendants of Shah Qutubuddin.

=== Syed Shah Ghulam Qutubuddin Chishti ===
He was the only son of Fani and was born in 1838. He became a murid of his father in the Chishti Order. He lived wholly in the company of his father and he gained all his education from him, enlightenment included.

It was a culture among the pandas (a caste amongst Hindus who perform a type of worship for the peace of the soul of the dead) that a devotee gave them a horse or any animal to them after they perform the worship for the peace of their relatives' soul. He died in 1887 at the age of 49 and was survived by a son.

=== Syed Shah Nezamuddin Chishti Monami ===
He was the only child of Shah Qutubuddin. He was born in 1860. He wanted to become the murid of his paternal grandfather, Fani, but Fani ordered him to become a murid of his father instead. He had Khilafat (Ijazah) of all orders from both his father and grandfather. He attended Bankipur Engineering College at Patna and received a degree.

Like his grandfather he was well-versed in all fields of education ranging from theology, history, Fiqh, engineering, Tib (Medical Science), Tassawwuf and jurisprudence.

He became Fani's successor after the latter's death in 1889. After becoming the Sajjada nashin he went to the dargah of Moinuddin Chishti at Ajmer to pay his homage before starting a new chapter of his life as the Sajjada nashin of the ancestral Khanqah founded by Tajuddin delhvi, the murid and khalifa of Moinuddin Chishti.

He died in 1904 at the age of 44. His first marriage was to the daughter of Shah Enayat Ali Maudidi, a descendant of Maudood Chishti, and he had a son named Syed Shah Hussainuddin Safi who became his successor. His second marriage was to the daughter of Akbar Danapuri-a great Abulolai Sufi, and had three more sons: Hafiz Hakeem Syed Shah Qayamuddin, Syed Shah Hesamuddin Chishti and Syed Shah Ehteshamuddin Chishti, as well as one daughter. Two of his sons, Shah Qayamuddin and Shah Ehteshamuddin, died in their youth. His daughter also died without bearing any sons to carry on his lineage. He was buried in his ancestral home at Danapur, Patna near the grave of his ancestors Syed-ul-Waseleen and Syed-ul-Majzubeen.

=== Shah Hussainuddin Safi ===
He was known as Syed Shah Hussainuddin Safi Chishti. He was the eldest son of Shah Nezamuddin Chishti. He was born in 1303 of the Islamic calendar. His initial education was completed in his maternal home at Sheikhpura.

He became his father's murid in the Chishti Order and got the khilafat Ijazah of all the orders from his father. His spiritual teachings were initiated by his father.

He became the Sajjada nashin of the ancestral Khanqah in 1904. The Khanqah flourished during his reign on the Sajjada. Everyone used to call him the exact copy of Shah-e-ata in every way. He took the charge of Darse Nezamia founded by his father, after his father's death. Apart from the traditional methods of the Khanqah of preaching, he instead opted for many modern methods of teaching.

- Halqae-Abulolaiya

It was an organization for all Muslims. A programme that was organised on the 17th of every Islamic month. Speeches of different Ulema and Sufi were organized in the campus of Khanqah. This group also had the responsibility of the burial of anonymous dead bodies of Muslims. This group is still in existence and the present Sajjada nashin of the Khanqah is the Chief of this organisation.

- Matbua-Monamia

Matbua-Monamia is a publication house that published different manuscripts preserved in the ancestral library of the Khanqah. It is the first publication house to be founded in Gaya. Hussainuddin published many books written by his ancestors, especially those written by Fani and his disciples. He authored many books, including the biography of many great Islamic personalities like Jalaluddin Tabrezi and Maqdum Munampak. He was the first to write the biography of Maqdum Munampak and Shah-e-ata. He also wrote travelogues. He was the first to write the history of Zahidia order in Bihar. He has also worked over Tasawwuf to a great extent. He added much to the Islamic literature in Bihar and to the literature of Munami Order.

- Hizbul-Foqra

In the early 19th century Wahabism arrived in India and many groups had come up against Sunni Islam and especially against the Khanqah of that time. Hussainuddin founded a group of learned people and Islamic scholars who would fight against anti-Sunni activities rising in Bihar. He united the scholars, masters, Sufis of all orders and other khanqahs of Bihar.

He died in 1939 at the age of 55 and left behind a son and daughter. He had three marriages. He did not have any children from his first wife. After the death of his first wife he married again and had children, but they all died in infancy and his second wife died soon after. His third marriage produced two children who have carried his lineage. His son, Amir-ul-Mashaiq Syed Shah Ghulam-e-Mustafa Ahmed Chishti is the present Sajjada nashin of the Khanqah. He had thousands of disciples and khalifa all over the Indian sub-continent who have carried his spiritual teachings forward.

=== Shah Hesamuddin Chishti ===
Born in 1899, he was the third son of Shah Nezamuddin Chishti. He received his education at Dars-e-Nezamia on the Khanqah campus and from his eldest brother, Shah Hussainuddin Safi. He became a disciple of his brother in the Chishti Order. The master awarded him Khilafat Ijazah of all the orders after completing all of his spiritual teachings. He was serving as the Chief librarian of the Jamia Millia Islamia when Hussainuddin called him in 1938 to give him all the responsibilities of the Khanqah. He was a very immaculate and soft-spoken person.

He left for Pakistan in 1958 after making his nephew, the son of Shah Hussainuddin Safi the new Sajjada nashin of the Khanqah. He had two marriages. He had one daughter from the first marriage, and six children (one son and five daughters) from the second marriage. He died in 1992, at the age of 93, and is buried in Yaseenabad graveyard, Azizabad, Karachi.

=== Amir-ul-Mashaiq Syed Shah Ghulam-e-Mustafa Ahmed Chishti ===
He was born on 14 December 1936. When Amir-ul-Mashaiq was two and a half years old, his father died. Before his death, Shah Hussainuddin Safi put the ancestral cap of the Sajjada nashin on his head, and announced him as his successor and the heir of all his personal and ancestral belongings of the Khanqah.

Amir-ul-Mashaiq served as the Sajjada nashin of the Khanqah for 54 years. He died on 30 January 2012. His funeral rites took place on the following day after the nemaz of Asr. His mausoleum is erected just adjacent to Fani, as the location of the tomb was revealed to the eldest grandson of Amir-ul-Mashaiq.

He had thousands of disciples all over India, Pakistan, and the USA, and he also had many khalifas all over India. He was married to a descendant of Abdul-Qadir Gilani, the eldest daughter of Hakeem Abdur-Rahim Qadri, Amjhar Sharif, Aurangabad, Bihar. He had three sons and eight daughters.

Each Sufi of Gaya learned spiritual lessons from him, which earned him the name Amir-ul-Mashaiq (the master of all masters).

== Disciples ==
It is believed by his followers that he had approximately 60,000 disciples all over Asia. Many of them went on to become successful Sufi of their time. A few are listed below.

=== Razzaqi order ===
Since Shah-e-Ata was given the title of Abdul Razzaq his disciples and Sufis of his order proudly wrote themselves as Sufis of Razzaqi order. Thus the Razzaqi Order came into existence.

=== Notable disciples ===
One major reason for the loss of information regarding many of his Khalifas was that it was lost during India's First War of Independence in 1857. The second cause was when the Wahhabi extremists formed Saudi Arabia and Sufis had to leave that region. Shah-e-Ata's Khulfas and their successors in the Middle East went out of touch and could not be traced after that.

Much information regarding Sufis of the Razzaqi order was lost during the Partition of India in 1947. So much less information regarding the disciples and Sufis of the order of Shah-e-Ata is available. Some information has been recovered from the book of Shahe-e-Ata, Kaifya-tul-Aarfeen wa Nisbatul Aasheqeen, which was published twice, once during the life of the author and again in the life of his great-grandson, Shah Hussainuddin Safi.

Many other Sufis who are the successors of the disciples of Shah-e-Ata have been tracked down since 1970 and have become an important source of information regarding the Razzaqi order and the history of Razzaqi order in different parts of Asia. Only the most famous Sufis are listed below, whose orders are still present by means of any living Sufi and as long as their successors are still in touch with the successors of Shah-e-Ata.

==== Syed Shah Qazi Mazahir Imam ====
He was the most loved disciple of Shah-e-ata. Initially he was hesitant to become a disciple of any Sufi master, (though he wanted Shah-e-ata to be his master), as his father was also the disciple of Shah-e-ata. Shah-e-ata used to say that "it seems that you are very hesitant to accept oath so i will have to take your oath forcefully". The words of Shah-e-ata became true. Qazi Mazahir was an immaculately beautiful person with a charismatic personality. He was once listening to Sema in the Manpur locality of Gaya district and a man who was looking for a Pir after completion of all his studies came to him respectfully and requested him to make him his disciple. Qazi Mazahir said,"I am still not associated with any of the Tariqah (orders) how can i make you my murid?". Qazi Mazahir kept on repeating himself, but the stranger was very firm about his commitment. At last Hazra Qazi Mazahir Imam went to Shah-e-ata to become his disciple. When he entered the Khanqah Shah-e-ata was sitting on the Sajjada, waiting for him. Shah-e-ata had already taken out the Shijra (the chain depicting the name of all the Sufis in the order) and signed the Khilafatnama (a certificate giving permission to the disciple to propagate the order further) to be given to him. When he became the murid of Shah-e-ata he would to visit his master in the Khanqah everyday on foot, covering a distance of five to seven kilometers across mountain and rivers. He died in 1942 and was buried in the Abgila locality of Gaya. He founded his own Khanqah which is famous as Khanqah mazahirya and is still in existence. He had three sons: Qazi Maqbool Imam, Qazi Waris Imam, and Qazi Jalil Imam. His youngest son died in 1992. The orders of his eldest and youngest son are no longer in existence, but the order of his second son and many of his Caliph is still present. Syed Shah Qazi Najam Imam Chishti Monami Hifzullah is the grandson of Qazi Maqbool Imam-the eldest son of Qazi Mazahir Imam Rahmatullah and the present Sajjadanasheen of Khanqah Mazahirya founded by Qazi Mazahir Imam Rahmatullah. He has Khilafat (Ijazah) from Qazi Waris Imam Rahmatullah (the second son of Qazi Mazahir Imam Rahmatullah).

==== Syed Shah Nudrat Hussain Burdawani ====
He was already the Sajjada nashin of his ancestral Khanqah established at Burdwan, West Bengal. He was ordered spiritually from his ancestors to go to Gaya and become the Fani's disciple. He wrote the Malfoozat (sayings of a Sufi) of Fani in forty lessons. After completing his sulook he went to Burdwan. After his death he was buried in his own Khanqah at Burdwan, West Bengal.

== See also ==
- Wali Kirani
- Sufism
