= Ibrahim Yukpasi =

Sufi religious leader

Syed Hazrat Khwaja Shams-ud-Din Ibrahim Yukpasi (born 760 AH, or AD 1358/1359) was a Sufi religious leader and son of Hazrat Khwaja Nasr-ud-Din Waleed.

== Family ==
He was born at Chisht in a family of Sadaat-e-Maudoodiya. He had two brothers, Khwaja Nizam-ud-Din Moudood and Khwaja Nuqr-ud-Din Shaal Pir Baba Moudood. The three brothers completed their education and Sufi training under the guidance and supervision of their father. It has been narrated that the descendants of Khwaja Sultan Maudood Chishti are not permitted to be initiated by anyone other than the elder Mashaik (the spiritual directors) of their own family. Khwaja Shams-ud-Din Ibrahim and his brother followed this tradition and obtained Khirqa-i-Wilayat-o-Khilafat (the patched authority and leadership) from their own father. They left their home at Chist with a mission to preach and teach the moral and spiritual Islamic rules. While his two brothers stayed at Pashin Quetta, Khwaja Shams-ud-Din Ibrahim traveled on to the valley of Mastung 50 km, away in the south of Quetta valley and selected a hillock called Safaid Bulandi (White height) for his dwelling. He had numerous Khulafa and a vast number of murids. But he himself trained and directly bestowed Khilafat upon his two sons (Khwaja Kalan was sajjada nashin as being the eldest) and four of his grandsons Khwaja Ahmed, Khwaja Ali, Khwaja Sultan Mohammad, Khwaja Ibrahim Dopasi.

1. Khwaja Kalan remained in Mastung.
2. Khwaja Mir Haibath Khan went to the area of Sarlath and Shorawak (a place near Afghan border)
3. Khwaja Ahmed was settled in Noshki.
4. Khwaja Ali was sent to Kalat.
5. Khwaja Sultan Mohammad proceeded to Mongachar and remained there.
6. Khwaja Ibrahim Dopasi went to live at Dhader.

Apart from his sons and grandsons he had other deputies too, nominated by him to continue the "work". One of his favorite Khalifa was Nizam-Ud-Din. He often said, "If someone comes to me with the request to pray for him, he should first go to Nizam-ud-Din". The Khalifa's grave can be visited besides the tomb of his Murshid. Syed Khawaja Ibrahim Yakpasi Chishti.
