= Usman Harooni =

Sufi saint of India

- Title: Abu Noor

Personal life
- Born: 6 May 1107
- Died: 3 December 1220 (aged 113)

Religious life
- Religion: Islam
- Denomination: Sunni
- Jurisprudence: Hanafi

Muslim leader
- Successor: Shareef Zandani
- Influenced by: Shareef Zandani
- Influenced: Moinuddin Chishti, Adam Sufi

Khwaja Usman Harooni (6 May 1107 – 3 December 1220, Urdu: عثمان ہارونی) was an early modern wali or Sufi saint of Islam in India, a successor to Shareef Zandani, sixteenth link in the Silsila of the Chishti order, and master of Moinuddin Chishti. Usman Harooni was born in Haroon, Iran. His year of birth is variously given as 1096, 1116 and 1131 AD (490, 510 and 526 AH). He is also known by the nicknames Abu Noor and Abu Mansur.

== Early life ==
When he was young, he met a mystic named Chirk. This association brought about a significant transformation in his life. As a result, he decided to seek a higher moral and spiritual life.

Harooni later met Shareef Zandani, a mystic and saint of the Chishti order, and requested to enroll as his spiritual disciple. Zandani accepted his request by placing a four-edged cap upon his head.

Zandani told him that the four-edged cap implied the following four things:

First is the renunciation of this world
Second is the renunciation of the world hereafter
Third is the renunciation of the desires of the self
Fourth is the renunciation of everything other than God

== Mystic ==
Harooni spent over thirty years in the company of his spiritual guide. During this period, he engaged in ascetic practices and prayers. As time passed, he gained many spiritual accomplishments. Zandani asked him guide to move on and spread the gospel of truth.

== Spiritual lineage ==
The traditional silsila (spiritual lineage) of the Chishti order is as follows

- 'Alī ibn Abī Ṭālib, fourth caliph of Sunni Islam
- Hasan of Basra, d. 728, an early Persian Muslim theologian
- 'Abdul Wāḥid Bin Zaid Abul Faḍl, d. 793, an early Sufi saint
- Al-Fudhayl bin 'Iyyadh
- Ibrahim ibn Adham, a legendary early Sufi ascetic
- Ḥudhayfah al-Mar'ashī
- Amīnuddīn Abū Ḥubayrah al-Baṣrī
- Mumshād Dīnwarī Al Alawi
- Abu Ishaq Shamī chishti (d. 940, founder of the Chishti order proper)
- Abu Abdaal Chishtī
- Naseruddin Abu Muhammad Chishtī
- Abu Yusuf Bin Saamaan, d. 1067
- Maudood Chishti, d. 1139
- Shareef Zandani, d. 1215 CE, 612 AH

== Disciples ==
Harooni had many disciples, including:

- Sultan Ul Hind Ata E Rasool Syed Khwaja Ghareb Nawaz Moinuddin Hassan Chisti
- Makhdoom Khwaja Syed Jalaluddin Abdal Chishti, (Hajipur, Bihar)
- Sheikh Najmuddin Safri
- Sheikh Muhammad Turk ayman
- Khwaja Saiful Mulk Chishti
- Khawaja Usman Ali Shah Chisti (Kolar Shareef)

== Travels ==
Harooni traveled widely to preach. He visited many countries and cities, including Bukhara, Baghdad, Falooja, Damascus, India and Mecca and Medina. He performed the Hajj.

In almost all cities, he visited Sufis and dervishes accomplished him. On the way to Oosh, he met Sheikh Bahauddin of Oosh. When he reached Badakshan, he met one of the attendants of Junayd of Baghdad.

During his travels, he was accompanied by *Moinuddin Chishti, who carried his tiffin basket.

Harooni visited India during the rule of Sultan Iltamish; before returning to Arabia for Hajj. In Belchi, near Biharsharif, India, he stayed and prayed.

== Death ==
Usman E Harooni Rahimullah died on 5 Shawwal, 617 AH (1220 AD) at Makkah . He was buried in Jannat ul Mu,alla Graveyard in Makkah. His Urs take place every year in Belchi, Bihar Sharif Nalanda, Bihar, on 15 & 16 of Shawwal. His blessings are invoked by people belonging to every strata of society and every school of thought. His actual tomb was in Makkah, until it was destroyed in the early years of the 21st century. The shrine in Belchi is Usmani Chillah (a chillah is a non-burial memorial shrine). This shrine is regarded as a symbol of Usman's spiritual strength and of the source of his blessings.

Chillah

As known, a muridah waliyah of Usman Harooni took promise from him that after her death her tomb will be beneath in his feet, but eventually Usman Harooni died in Mecca, Arabia. To fulfill his promise, Usman Harooni once again existed in Belchi and ordered the muridah to build his shrine and after her death, she'll be buried beneath the shrine of Usman Harooni in Belchi. Beside his Chillah was built the tomb of the Waliya. For the past 650 years, an annual Urs has taken place every year.

The first Urs ceremony was commemorated (originated) by Makhdoom Fariduddin Tavaela Bukhsh (First Sajjada Nasheen). His shrine is in Chandpura, Bihar Sharif. He was the son of Ibrahim (Nephew of Nizamuddin Auliya) & Fariduddin Tavaela Bukhsh founded the Chishti Nizami order in Bihar, he was the nephew & disciple of Noor Qutbe Alam Pandavi. He was the disciple of Alaul Haq Pandavi (also the Peer of Makhdoom Ashraf Jahangir Simnani). He was the disciple of Akhi Siraj Aainae Hind & he was the disciple of Nizamuddin Auliya (Mehboob E Illahi).

The esteemed details of the chillah & life of Usman Harooni are noted in the book "Moin ul Qul" by the late 19th century Sufi leader Gudri Shah Baba, of Ajmer.

== Message and teachings ==
According to Usman Harooni, a great man is one who is endowed with virtues such as contentment, sincerity, self-abnegation, self-sacrifice and above all, spirit of renunciation. He said that the ego was an enemy, as it did not allow rational thought, wise actions and a happy life. He emphasized that unless a man loves human beings, it is impossible for him to love God.
