= Ali al-Akbar =

Ali al-Akbar may refer to:

- Ali al-Akbar ibn Husayn (d. 680), son of Husayn ibn Ali
- Ali al-Akbar ibn Hasan (late 9th/early 10th century), purported son of the 11th Twelver Shi'ite Imam Hasan al-Askari and brother of the 12th Imam Muhammad al-Mahdi
