= Gulzar, Quetta =

Gulzar
- Location within Pakistan
- Coordinates: 30.09°N 66.57°E
- Country: Pakistan
- Province: Balochistan
- Elevation: 1,653 m (5,423 ft)
- Time zone: UTC+5 (PST)

Gulzar is a union council of the Quetta District in the Balochistan province of Pakistan. It is located to the south-east of the district capital Quetta with an altitude of 1,653 m (5,423 ft).

When the British control on Quetta was established, it was turned into an army garrison. Today, where the staff college Quetta stands, at that very place, was a fort called "Fort Durrani". when the British chose Quetta to be a military garrison, they bought this fort from the Durrani's. In 1905 Asia's largest military academy staff college was established in Quetta. The Durranis were removed from it. Therefore, Ghullam Sarver Khan Durrani s/o Sardar Saeed Khan Durrani bought a very large piece of land from Syed Mohammad Ashraf Shah s/o Syed Mohammad Sadiq Shah adjacent to killi Kirani Quetta and formed a village there called killi Gulzar. It is present today as well and its record is present in land review records.

== See also ==
- Khwaja Wali Kirani
