= Ali al-Akbar ibn Hasan =

Sunni Muslim saint

Ali Akbar
- Born: 868–874
- Died: Termez
- Other names: Abdullah, Akbar, Asghar, al-Taqi, al-Muttaqi, Muhammad or Mahmoud
- Children: Sayyid Abu Muhammad Mahmud al-Makki; Sayyid Ali al-Asghar; Sayyid Uthman; Sayyid Musa; Sayyid Isa; Sayyid Husayn
- Parent: Hasan al-Askari
- Relatives: Muhammad (forefather), Fatimah (sister), Muhammad al-Mahdi (brother), Musa (brother), Ja'far (brother), Ibrahim (brother)

Sayyid Ali al-Akbar ibn al-Hasan (Arabic: سید علي الأكبر بن الحسن, romanized: Sayyid ʿAlī al-Akbar ibn al-Ḥasan) was a Sunni Muslim saint, and according to some historians of genealogy the second son of Imam Hasan al-Askari, the eleventh Imam of the Ahlul-Bayt.

Sayyid Ali al-Akbar is venerated in Sunni and Shiite Islam as the patriarch of various Sufi Saints.

== Introduction ==
The genealogical records of some Middle Eastern families, especially from Persia and Khorasan, indicate that 11th Imam had a second son, Sayyid Ali. This is supported by the belief of various followers Sufi saints, like the Sunni saints Mir Sayyid Ali Hamadani, Moinuddin Chishti and Bahauddin Naqshband, who were the founders of the Chishtiyya and Naqshbandiyya Sufi orders and also the prominent Sufi Saint Khwaja Maudood Chishti.

In his Usul al-Kafi, al-Kulayni wrote, "All confirms the claim that Hasan al-Askari had more than one wife, in addition to slave girls, with whom he had relations" and, "when the caliph received news of Imam Hasan al-Askari's illness, he instructed his agents to keep a constant watch over the house of the Imam... he sent some of these midwives to examine the slave girls of the Imam to determine if they were pregnant. If a woman was found pregnant she was detained and imprisoned."

== Descendants ==
According to the earliest reports as cited below from official family tree documents and records, Imam Hasan al-Askari fathered seven children and was survived by six. The names of his illustrious biological children were: Imam Muhammad al-Mahdi, Musa, Ja’far, Ibrahim, Fatima and ‘Ali, sometimes referred to as al-Akbar, al-Asghar, al-Taqi, al-Muttaqi or al-Amir, Abu Abdullah, Shah Abul Maali. Еarly books on Sayyid genealogy also mention that the descendants of Sayyid Ali ibn Sayyid imam Hassan al-Askari lived in the city of Sabzevar in shiite muslims Iran.

Notable descendants of Sayyid Ali Akbar include the eleventh generation Sufi saints, Maudood Chishti and Bahauddin Naqshband.

Notable descendants of Maudood Chishti :

• Shaal Pir Baba

• Wali Kirani

• Khwaja Abdullah Chishti

Annemarie Schimmel wrote, "Khwaja Mir Dard's family, like many nobles from Bukhara, led their pedigree back to Baha'uddin Naqshband, after whom the Naqshbandi order is named, and who was a descendant, in the eleventh generation of the eleventh Shia imam, Sayyid al-Hasan al-Askari."

== Controversy ==
There are some Shiite genealogists like Walid Al-Baaj, who describe that there were old genealogical sources, stating that Sultan Sadat Sayyid Ali Akbar was the second son of Sayyid imam Muhammad al-Askari who is considered the elder brother of imam Hasan al-Askari, and his descendants. Al-Baaj wrote a book about the descent of Ali Akbar from Muhammad ibn Ali al Hadi and not Hasan al Askari in 1999.

Harvard Professor Annemarie Schimmel highlights the descent of Bahauddin Naqshband from Hasan al Askari through Sayyid Ali Akbar, referring to the Sunni noble Khwaja Mir Dard´s family and "many nobles, from Bukhara; they led their pedigree back to Baha`uddin Naqshband, after whom the Naqshbandi order is named, and who was a descendent, in the 13th generation of the 11th Shia imam al-Hasan al-Askari".

== Burial place ==
The genealogy of Khwaja Samandar Muhammad ibn Baqi al-Termizi - the famous sheikh and poet, writer and scholar, author of "Dastur al Mulk" (Guide to Kings) (XVII сentury), goes back to Sultan Sadat - Al-Amir Sayyid Ali Akbar Termizi - in turn Al-Amir Sayyid Ali Akbar bin Sayyid imam Al-Askari, it is mentioned in his history book called "Dastur al Mulk". The 15th century famous poet, musicologist, scholar of language and other sciences Sahib Balkhi Sharifi wrote about the Sayyids of Termiz. His one of the poems begins with the name of Sultan Saadat (Sultan of Sayyids), i.e. the praise of Al-Amir Sayyid Ali Akbar al Termizi. Therefore, Sultan Saadat (Sodot) is the Sultan of Sayyids and the owner (historians suggest that Sayyid Ali Akbar bin Sayyid imam Muhammad Al-Askari's burial place is located in the main mausoleum Sultan Saodat memorial complex) "Sultan Saodat (Sadat)" Mausoleum (erected 9-15 centuries) in Termez city - and Sultan Sadat is Sayyid Ali Akbar al Termizi, which is also mentioned with the nickname (kunyat) Sayyid Abu Muhammad who presumably died at the end of the 9th century or early 10th century in Termez. Many tombs and nameless graves of more than a thousand Sayyids are located in the "Sultan Saodat" memorial complex and its territory in Termez.

== See also ==
- Descendants of Ali ibn Abi Talib
- Twelve Imams
- Imamate (Twelver doctrine)
- Ahl Al-Bayt
- Sayyid

Sayyid Ali Akbar of the Ahl al-Bayt Banu Hashim; Clan of the Banu Quraish Born: 242 AH ≈ 856 CE Died: 314 AH ≈ 926 CE
Shia Islam titles
Preceded by candidate of the 11th Imam of Twelver Shia Islam Sayyid Imam Muhammad al-Askari bin Imam Ali al-Hadi	Sultan Sadat; Muhammadite Shia and Sunni Islam; 866–926	Succeeded by Imam Muhammad al-Mahdi bin Imam Hasan al-Askari bin Imam Ali al-Hadi
