= Kirani =

- Location within Pakistan
- Coordinates: 30.09°N 66.57°E
- Country: Pakistan
- Province: Balochistan
- Elevation: 1,653 m (5,423 ft)
- Time zone: UTC+5 (PST)

Kirani (N 30.17 E 66.94) is an historical village lying five miles (8 km) west of Quetta city, capital of Baluchistan province of Pakistan on the outskirts of the Chiltan range and is set to derive its name from a defile lying near the village known as Giran Nai, or Kran Tangi. The village comprises the "mahals" under the Naurang, Malak, Kirani and Mast karezes and also karakhsa, and is said to have been established some seven generations back by Khwaja Wali, a Moudodi/Chishti syed, whose grave with that of his son, Mir Shahdad lies enclosed in a mud wall in the middle of the old graveyard. To the west of the village lies the Kirani Karez, which is said to date from the time of the Zoroastrians and behind the site of the existing village lies the ruins now of an old village where earthen pots of various kinds and iron arrowheads have been unearthed. Close to this is a solitary mulberry tree, called "Yaka tut", which the people believe has stood there from time immemorial.

== History ==
According to the 1901 census the village possessed 157 houses and had a population of 634: males 355 and females 279. No industries are carried on but silk embroidery of a superior kind is done for house use. The wealth of the village is carried in its fruit culture; the gardens cover over 77 acres (310,000 m^{2}) and include 27 vineyards and 34 mixed gardens; the latter contain mulberries, figs, pomegranates, apples, apricots, plums and peaches. Many varieties of grapes are grown and fine melons are produced. The fruit and melons are generally sold for a lump sum to dealers, who retail them in Quetta market.

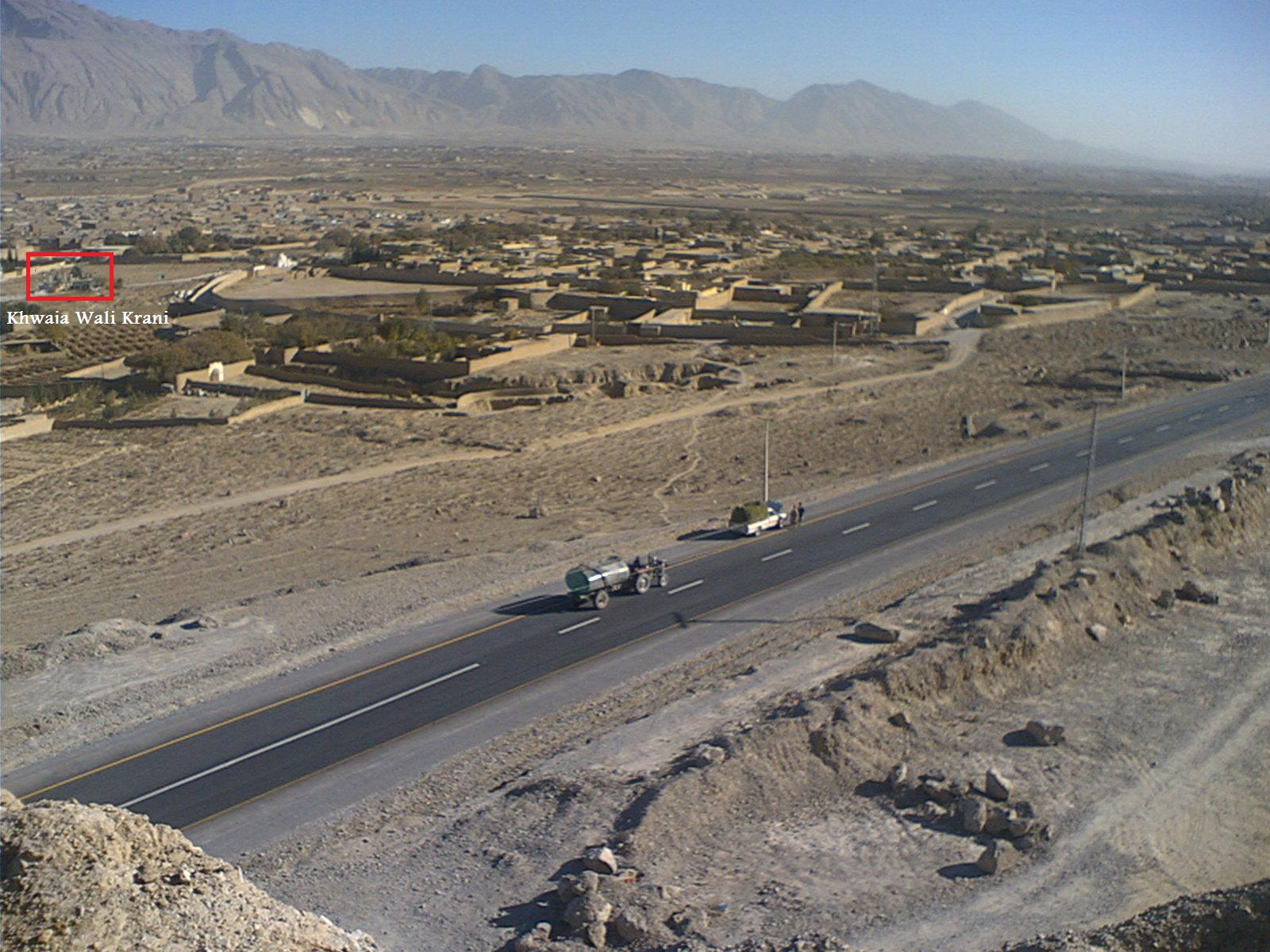
Kirani in 2008

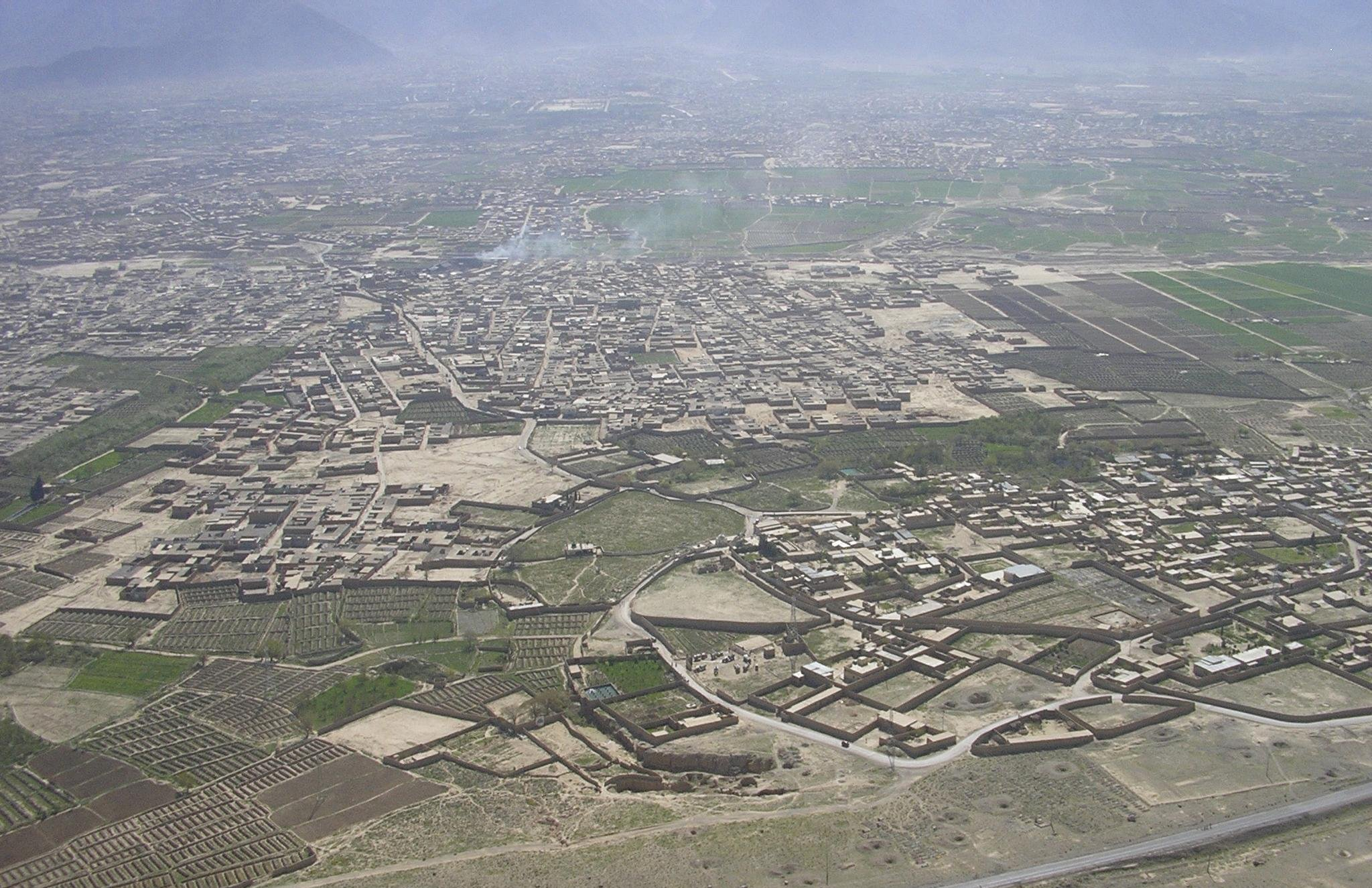
in 2007

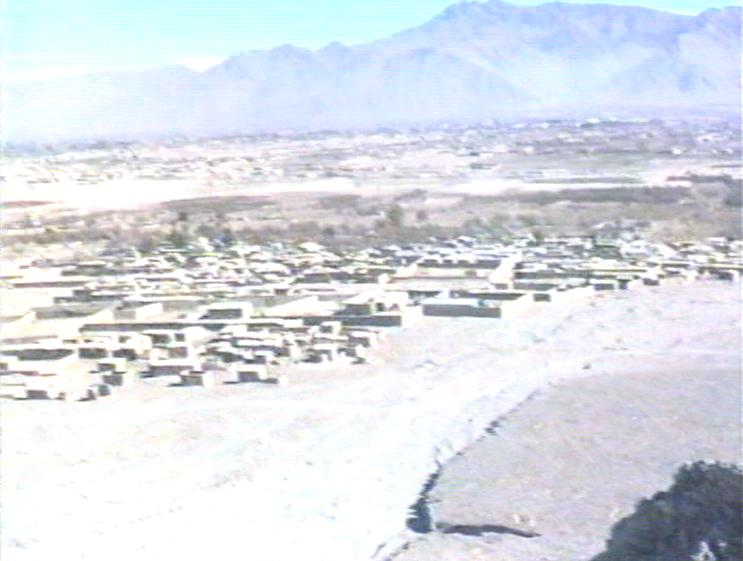
and in 1985

== See also ==
- Shaal Pir Baba
- Khwaja Wali Kirani
