= Maudood Chishti =

11th-century Afghan Sufi saint

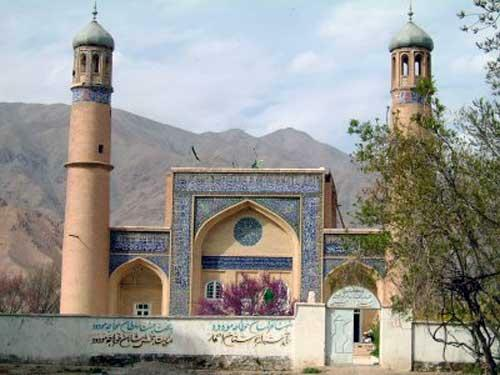
- Mausoleum of Maudood Chishti, Chist, Afghanistan

Personal life
- Children: • Hazrat Khwaja Sayyid Najmuddin Ahmad Mushtaq • Hazrat Khwaja Sayyid Mansuruddin Chishti
- Relatives: Imam Husayn

Religious life
- Religion: Islam
- Lineage: Hasan al-Askari

Muslim leader
- Influenced by: Abu Yusuf ibn Saman
- Influenced: Shareef Zandani

Khwajah Sayyid Qutubuddin Maudood Chishti رحمة الله عليه (Urdu: مودود چشتی) (also known as Qutubuddin, Shams Sufiyaan and Chiraag Chishtiyaan) was an early day Sufi Saint, a successor to his father and master Abu Yusuf Bin Saamaan, twelfth link in the Sufi silsilah of Chishti Order, and the Master of Shareef Zandani. He was born around 430 Hijri in the city of Chisht. He initially received education from his father. He memorized the Qur'an by age 7 and completed his education when he was 16. His work includes two books, Minhaaj ul Arifeen and Khulaasat ul Shariah. He died in the month of Rajab at the age of 97 in 533 AH (March 1139 CE). He was buried at Chisht like many of the early Chishtiyya.

== Tasawuf ==
Khwajah Sayyid Qutubuddin Maudood Chishti became the mureed of his father Khwajah Nasir Abu Yusuf Bin Saamaan Chisti. After he became a mureed, his murshid (Master) addressed him by saying, "O Qutubuddin Maudood adopt the path of the Faqr." The word "faqr" is literally translated as "poverty", but in the language of tasawwuf, it means to be rich with Allah.

It is for one to have total trust in Allah and not to be dependent on any other than Allah. Faqar is the way of true dervishes. Khwajah Maudood Al Chisti accepted his murshids (spiritual guidance) advice. Shortly thereafter he went into seclusion and remained absorbed in worship for twenty years. During this period, he rarely ate and was reported to complete two recitations of the Quran during the day and two during the night. He also used to constantly make the zikr of La Ilaha Illallah.

== Khwaja Maudood's Khalifa ==
Khwaja Mawdud Chishti visited Balkh (the place of birth of Jalaluddin Rumi) and Bukhara, a place mentioned in the famous line of Hafez, "If that Turk of Shiraz would take my heart in his hand, I would give for his Hindu mole both Bukhara and Samarkand." Khwaja Haji Sharif Zindani, his successor, renounced everything. He led a life of strict seclusion for 40 years and hated society. He used to live on leaves of trees. Although several of the Chishtiyya stressed the value of asceticism, in general they said that seclusion and ascetic practice was for short periods only. Live in the midst of society rather than keep your spiritual ideals. It is said that the followers of Khwaja Qutubuddin were around 10,000, not including close friends and allies. It is impossible to enumerate Khwaja Mawdud's Khulafa. For the sake of barakat, a few are mentioned hereunder.

- Khwaja Abu Ahmed
- Khwaja Ahmad Zandani
- Shah Sanjan
- Shaikh Abu Nasseer Shakeeban
- Shaikh Hassan Tibti
- Shaikh Ahmed Baderoon
- Khwaja Sabz Paush
- Shaikh Uthman Awwal
- Khwaja Abul Hassan
- Ataa Ullah Khan Wato Kheshgi

Among them the link in this (CHISTI) Silsila is Khwaja Shareef Zindani. That is why his message spread. His influence spread west to Khurasan, Iraq, Syria, Hijaz, and Tihamah and in the south to Iran, Siestan and the subcontinent. In the west, his message was spread by the likes of Sharif Zindani and Khwaja Usman Harooni. Khwaja Qutubuddin was 29 when his father died and he inherited the throne. He never visited the rich or went to the royal courts. He was a simple man who led a simple life. He was always courteous to the needs of others. He always was the first to greet people and respected everyone.

== Realation with Abul A'la Maududi ==
The renowned Islamic scholar Abul A‘la Maududi, often regarded by his followers as a mujaddid (reviver) of the 14th century Hijri, was a descendant of Khwaja Qutbuddin Maudud Chishti through the following lineage:

- Khwaja Qutbuddin Maudud Chishti
- Khwaja Abu Ahmad Maududi Chishti
- Khwaja Ruknuddin Maududi Chishti
- Khwaja Nizamuddin Maududi Chishti
- Khwaja Qutbuddin Muhammad Maududi Chishti
- Khwaja Ali Abu Ahmad Sani Maududi Chishti
- Khwaja Ahmad Abu Yusuf Sani Maududi Chishti
- Khwaja Muhammad Zahid Maududi Chishti
- Khwaja Qutbuddin Maudud Sani Chishti
- Khwaja Nizamuddin Ali Maududi Chishti
- Khwaja Muhammad Muhyuddin Shah Khajgi Maududi Chishti
- Shah Abul Ala Maududi Chishti
- Shah Abdul Ali Maududi
- Shah Abd al-Ghani Maududi
- Khwaja Abd al-Samad Maududi
- Khwaja Abd al-Shakur (Khushhal Muhammad) Maududi
- Khwaja Abd Allah (Gul Muhammad) Maududi
- Khwaja Abd al-Bari (Mir Bhikhari) Maududi
- Khwaja Abd al-Wali (Mir Fazl Ilahi) Maududi
- Shah Abd al-Aziz (Mir Karam Ila) Maududi
- Shah Waris Ali Maududi
- Sayyid Hasan Maududi
- Sayyid Ahmad Hasan Maududi
- Sayyid Abul A‘la Maududi

== Books ==
Chisti's works include two books, Minhaaj ul Areifeen and Khulaasat ul Shariah.

== Sayings ==
1. . The lover of sama' (Sufi music) is a stranger to the outside world, but is a friend to God.
2. . The mysteries of sama' are inexplicable. If you reveal them you are liable to punishment.

== Miracles ==
- Moulana Zakariyah says: "Khwajah Maudood Chisti acquired the capabilities known as Kashf-e-Quloob (revelations of the conditions of the hearts) and Kashf-e-Quboor (revelation of the conditions of the graves)."
- Whenever Khwaja Maudood Chishti wanted to see the Ka'aba, he could see it even though he was in Chisht.
- Khwaja Qutbuddin Maudood Chishti's dead body flew in the air on its way to the graveyard. Khwaja Fareeduddin Ganj Shakar upon narrating this fell unconscious.

== Shijra-e-tareekat ==
Main source:

- Muhammad
- Ali

Early Sufis who, though not part of a formal order, are part of the spiritual chain:

1. Hasan al-Basri (died 110 AH)
2. Abdul Waahid Bin Zaid (died 176 AH)
3. Fudhail Bin Iyadh (died 187 AH)
4. Ibrahim Bin Adham (died 162 AH)
5. Ḥudhayfa al-Marʿashī (died 202 AH)
6. Abū Hubayra al-Baṣrī (died 287 AH)
7. Mumshad Dinawari (died 298 AH)

Start of the Chishti Order:

1. Abu Ishaq Shami (died 329 AH)
2. Abu Ahmad Abdal (died 355 AH)
3. Abu Muhammad Bin Abi Ahmad (died 411 AH)
4. Abu Yusuf Bin Saamaan (died 459 AH)
5. Maudood Chishti (died 527 AH)
6. Shareef Zandani
7. Usman Harooni
8. Moinuddin Chishti
9. Qutbuddin Bakhtiar Kaki
10. Fariduddin Ganjshakar

After Fariduddin Ganjshakar the Chishti Order in Hind (India/South Asia) split into two branches i.e. the Chishti-Nizami founded by Nizamuddin Auliya and the Chishti-Sabri founded by Alauddin Sabir Kaliyari.

== Family tree ==
Moudoi Chishti Kirani Quetta Balochistan Pakistan

- (1) – Imam Ali ibn Abu Talib Amir al-Mu'minin Buried at the Imam Ali Mosque in Najaf, Iraq. {March 17, 599 — February 28, 661 aged 61}
- (2) – Imam Husayn ibn Ali Sayed al- — Buried at the Imam Husayn Shrine in Karbala, Iraq. (B4h D60h)
- (3) – Imam Ali ibn Husayn al-Sajjad, Zayn al-ʿĀbidin Buried in Jannat al-Baqi Medina. (B-h D94h)
- (4) – Imam Muhammad ibn Ali al-Baqir al-Ulum Buried in Jannat al Baqi Medina. (B-h D114h)
- (5) – Imam Ja'far al-Sadiq al-Sadiq — in Jannat al-Baqi Medina. (B80h D148h)
- (6) – Imam Musa al-Kadhimal-Kazim in the Kadhimiya in Baghdad Iraq. (B128h D183h)
- (7) – Imam Ali ibn Musa al-Rida, Reza in the Imam Reza shrine Mashad. (B153h D203h)
- (8) – Imam Muhammad ibn Ali al-Taqi, al-Jawad in the Kadhimiya in Baghdad, Iraq. (B195h D220h)
- (9) – Imam Ali al-Hadi al-Hadi, al-Naqi in the Al Askari Mosque in Samarra Iraq. (B214h D254h)
- (10) – Imam Hasan al Askari
- (11) - Sultan Us Sadaat Mir Syed Ali Al akbar ibn Hassan
- (12) - Mir Sayyid Abdullah
- (13) – Mir Abu Muhammed Al Hussain in Chist Hirat present Afghanistan. (B—h D352h)
- (14) – Mir Abu Abdullah Muhammed in Chisht Hirat present Afghanistan. (B270h D324h)
- (15) – Mir Abu Jaffer Ibrahim in Chisht Hirat present Afghanistan. (B-h D370h)
- (16) – Mir Shams-ud-din Abu Nassar Muhammed Saman in Chisht Hirat present Afghanistan. (B-h D398h)
- (17) – Mir Khwaja Abu Yusuf Bin Saamaan Nasir-ud-din Abu Yusuf Bin Saamaan in Chisht Hirat present Afghanistan. (B375h D459h)
- (18) – Syed Khwaja Qutubuddin Maudood Chishti in Chisht Hirat Afghanistan. (B430h D527h)

(Referenced from the book: Khwaja Ibrahim Yakpassi Chishti)

1. Imam Ali al Murtaza
2. Imam Hasan al Mujtaba
3. Hasan al Muthanna
4. Abdullah al Mahd
5. Hasan
6. Majad ul Muali
7. Hasan
8. Yahya
9. Ibrahim
10. Sultan Farghana
11. Abu Ahmed Abdal
12. Amatullah
13. Nasruddin Abu Yusuf
14. Qutbuddin Maudood

== Images ==
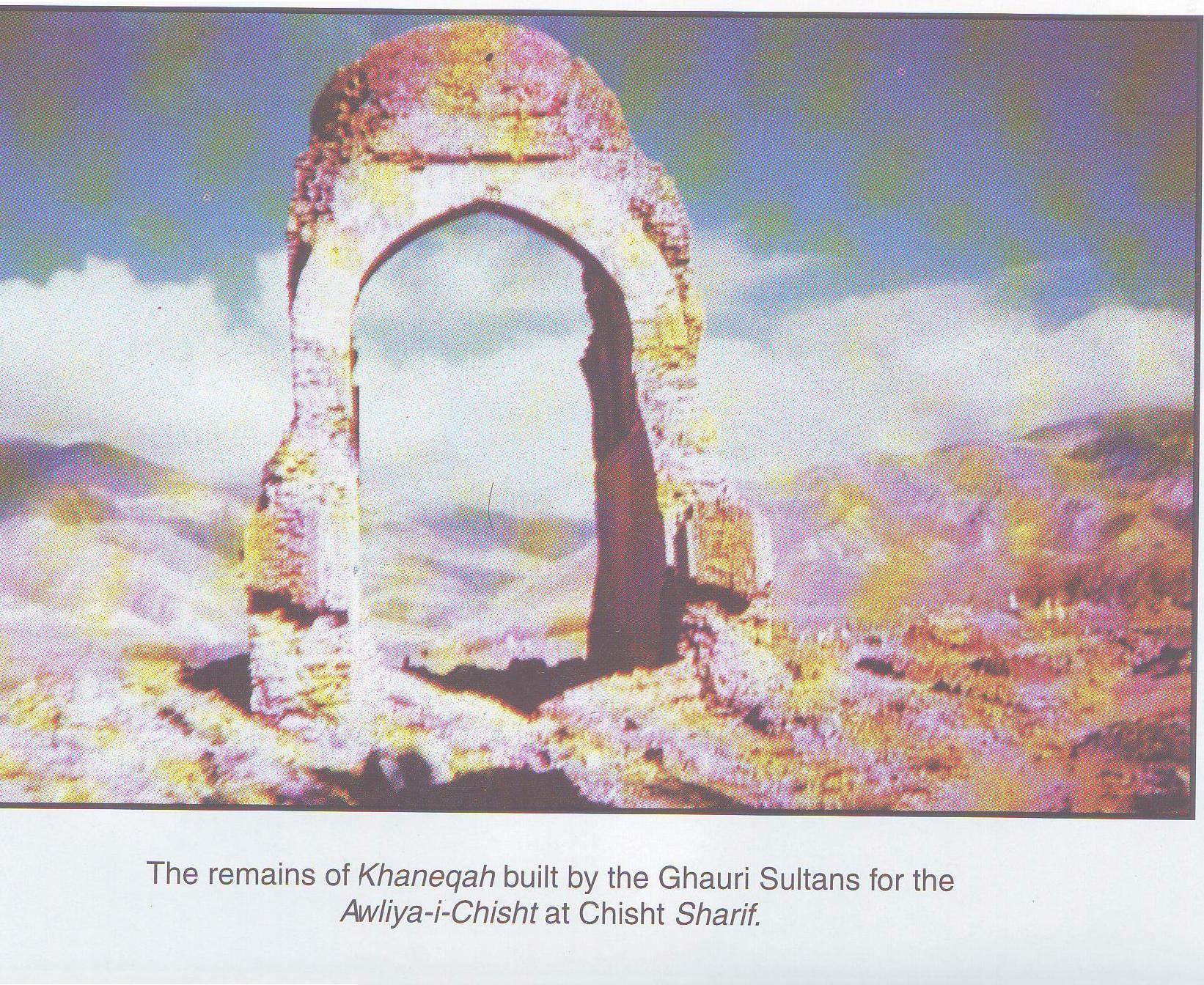
Khaneqah Awliya-i-Chisht.

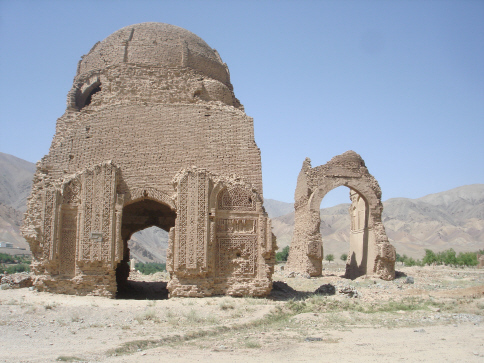
Ruins of the Khaneqah in present-day

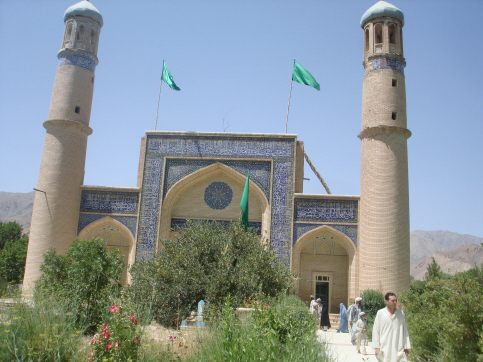
Mausoleum of Maudood Chisti

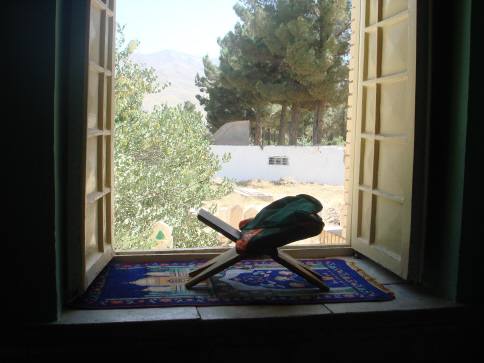
Tomb window

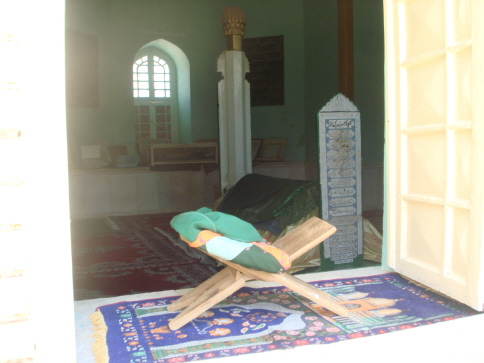
A view of the interior

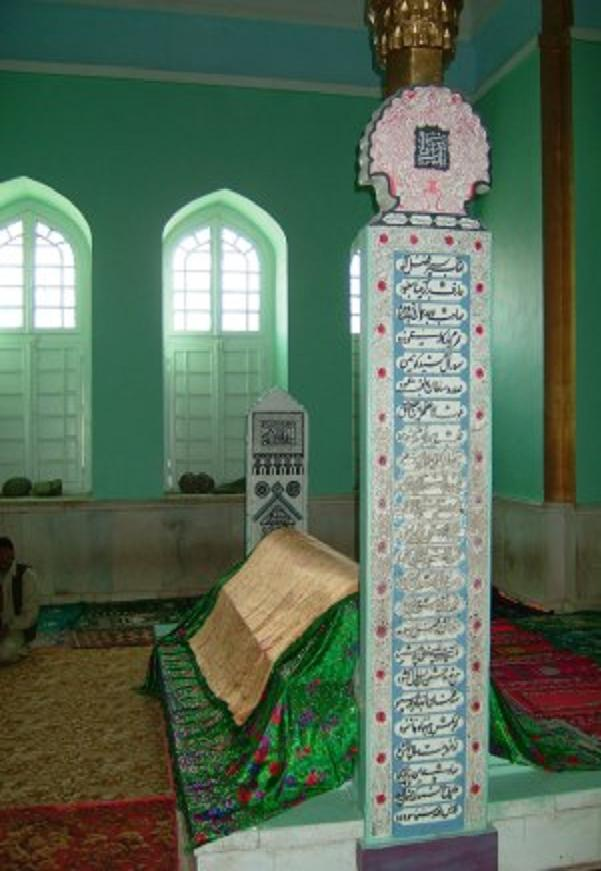
Grave of Maudood Chisti

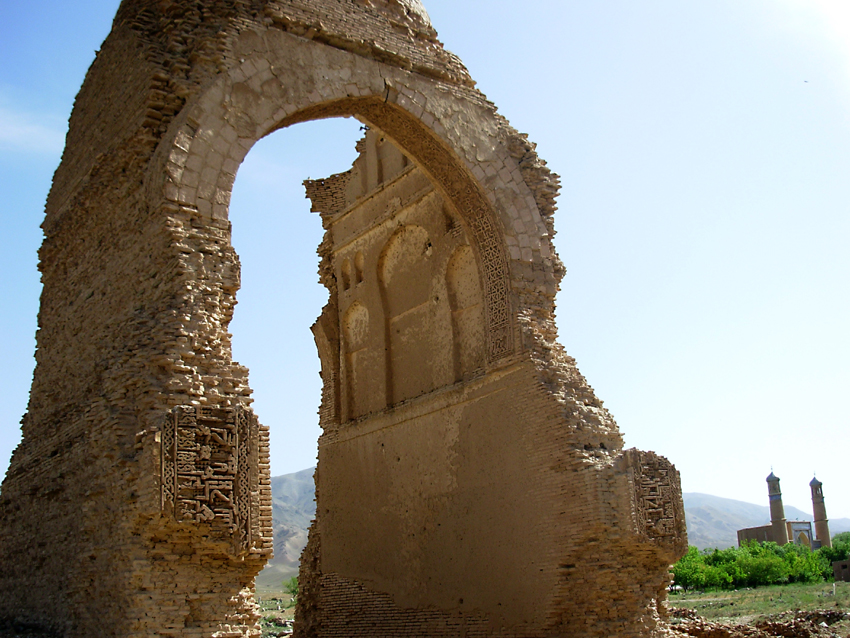
Ruins of arches of the ancient Khaneqah

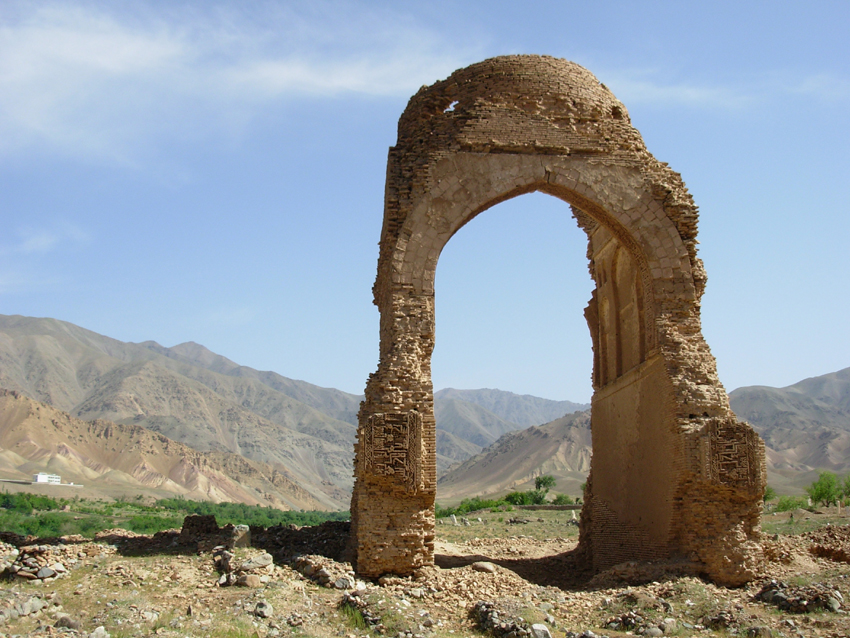
Ruins of Khaneqah

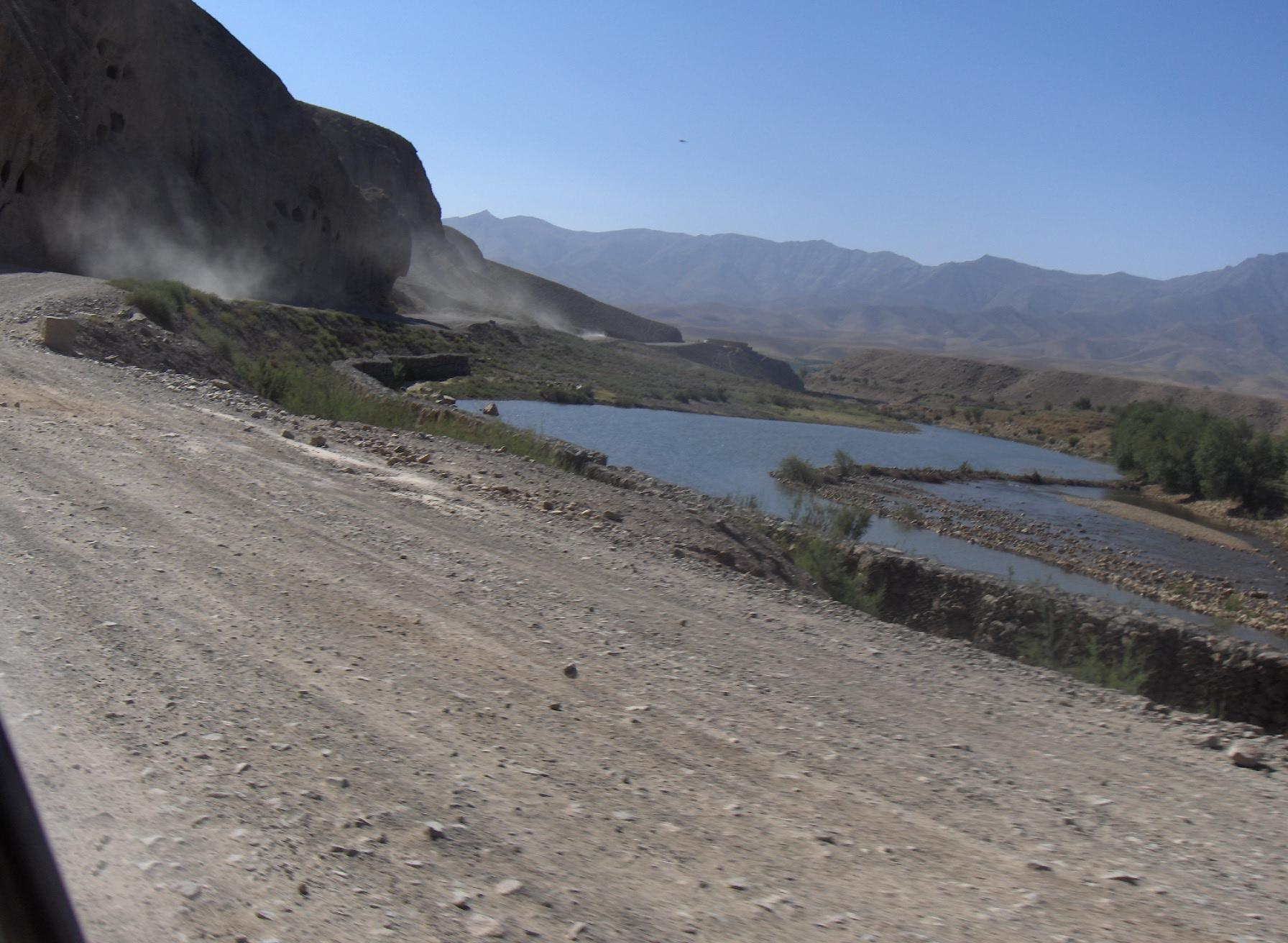
Chisht Valley

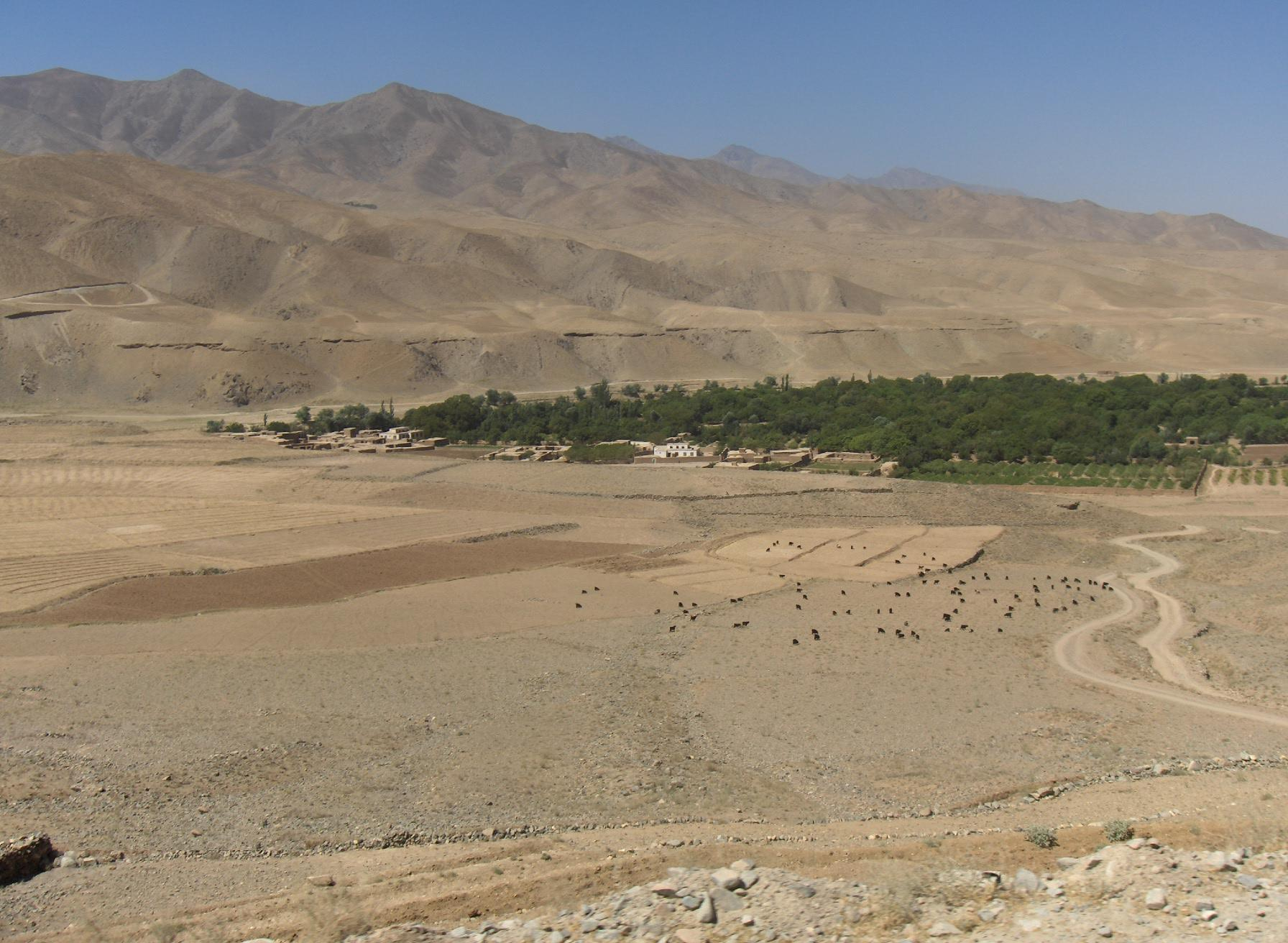
Chisht Valley

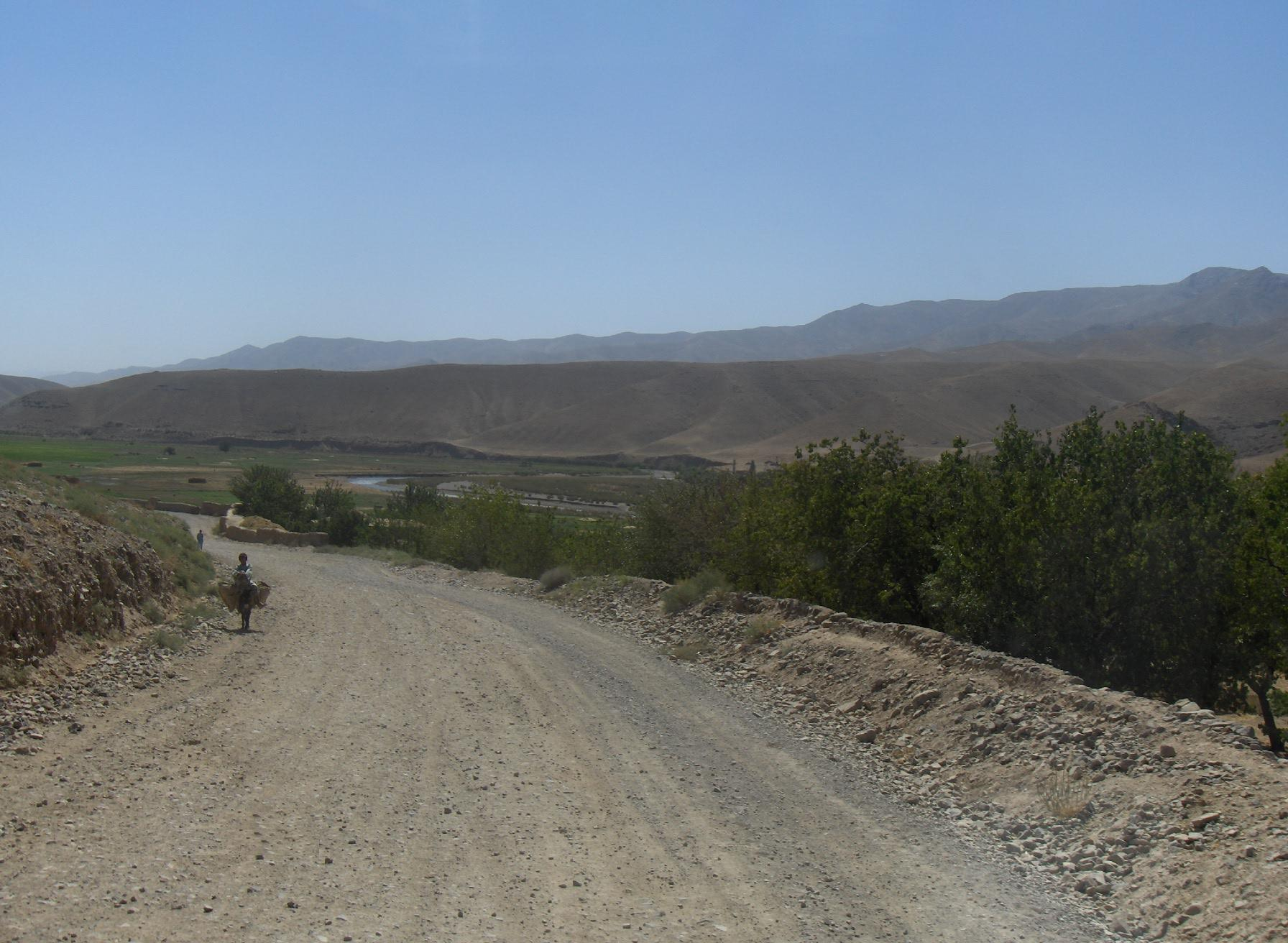
Chisht Valley

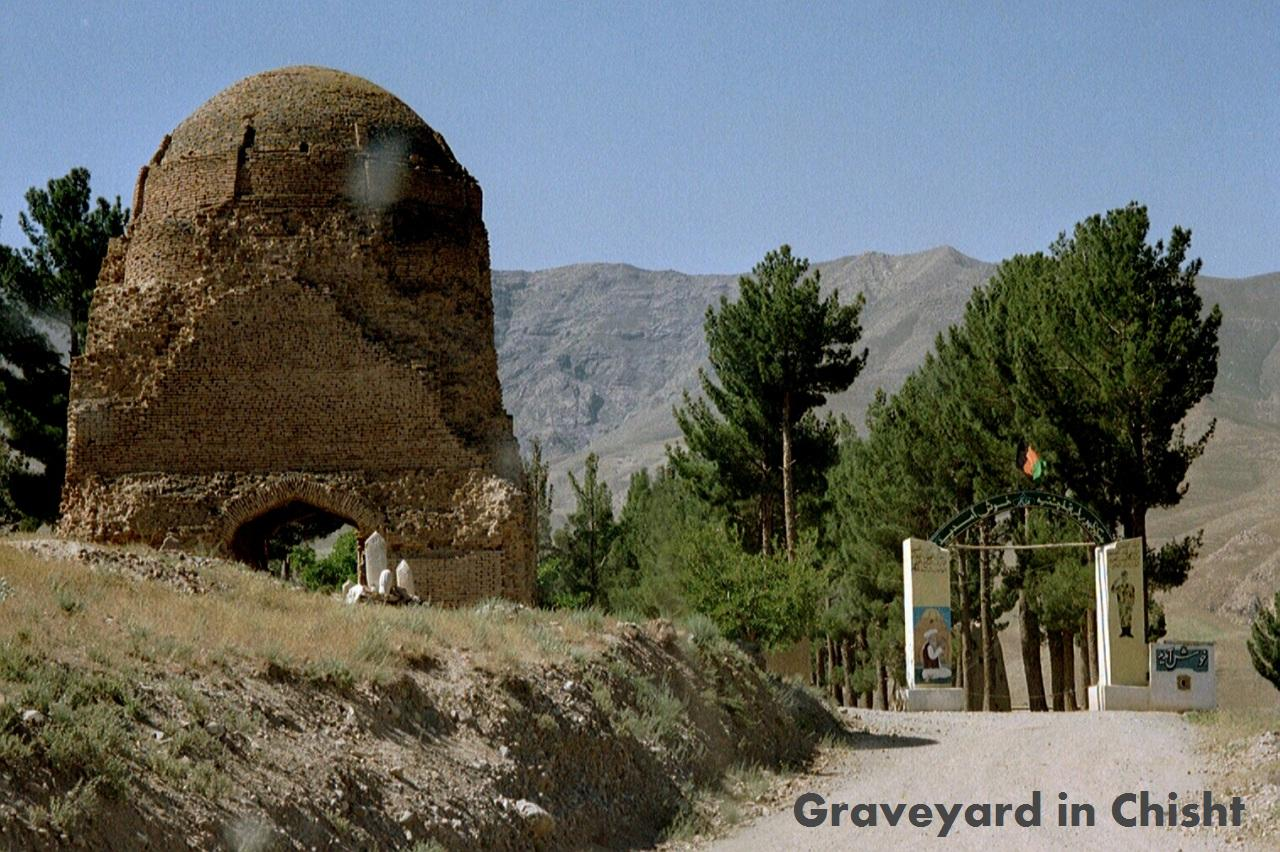
Graveyard in Chisht

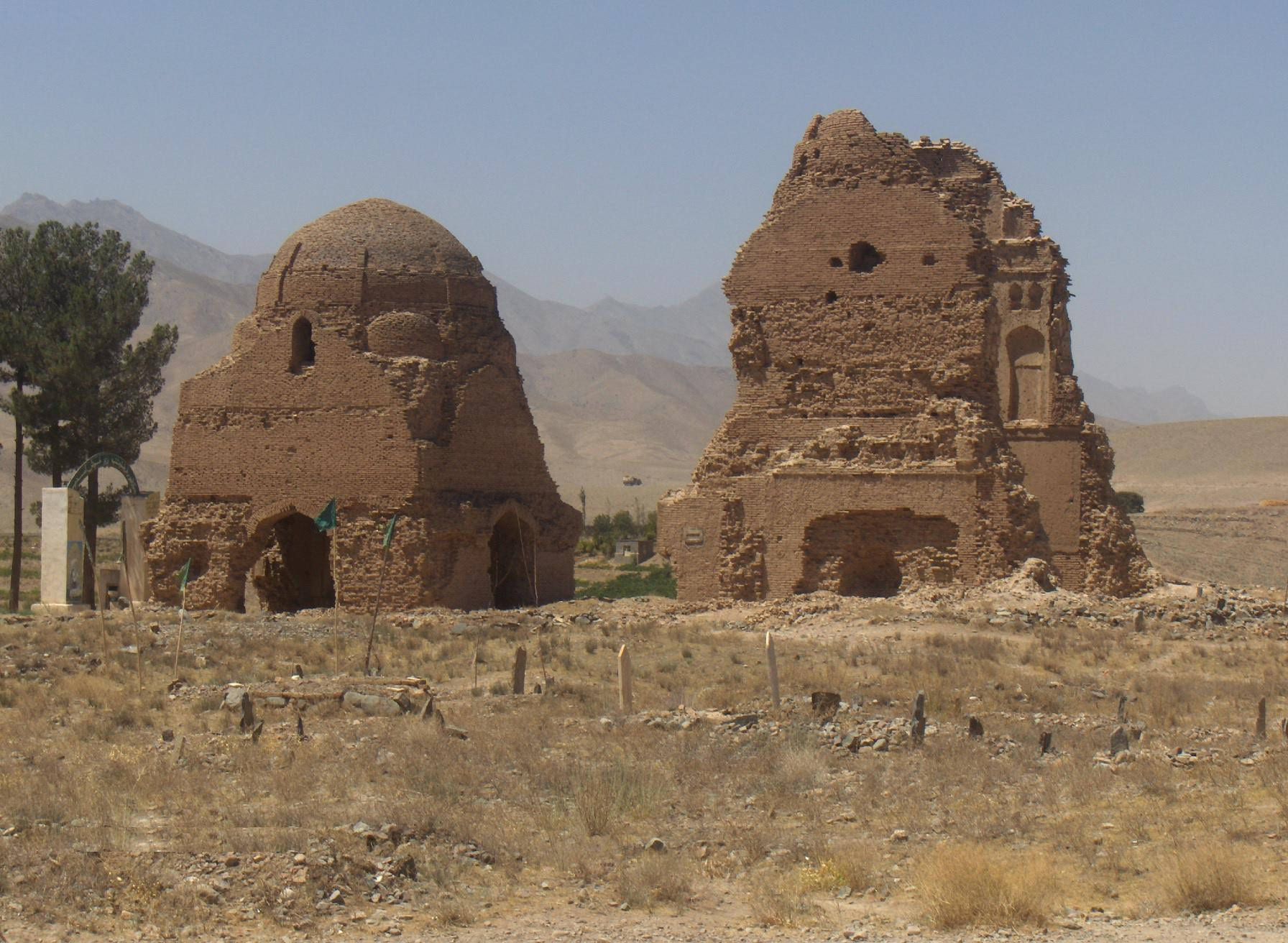
Ancient tombs at Chist

== See also ==
- Khwaja Ibrahim Yukpasi

== Bibliography ==
- Kāndhlawi, Muhammad Zakariyyah (2010). "Khwaajah Maudood Chishti". Mashāyikh-e-Chisht [The Mashaikh of Chisht]. Translated by Mujlisul Ulma of South Africa. New Delhi: Adam Publishers and Distributors. pp. 150–`152. ISBN 978-81-7435-592-8.
