= Abu Yusuf ibn Saman =

Sufi saint

- Influences: Abu Muḥammad Chishti
- Influenced: Maudood Chishti

Sayyed Nasir-ud-deen Abu Yusuf Chishti ibn Abu Nasr Muhammad Saman was an early day Sufi Saint.

He was a successor to his maternal uncle and master Abu Muḥammad Chishti, eleventh link in the Sufi silsila of the Chishti Order and the father and Master of Maudood Chishti. Abu Yusuf was a descendant of Muhammad. He was born at 985 CE, he died on 13 Rajab 459 AH (30th May 1067 CE) at the age of 84.
