= Chishti Sharif =

Chishti Sharif چشت شریف
- District
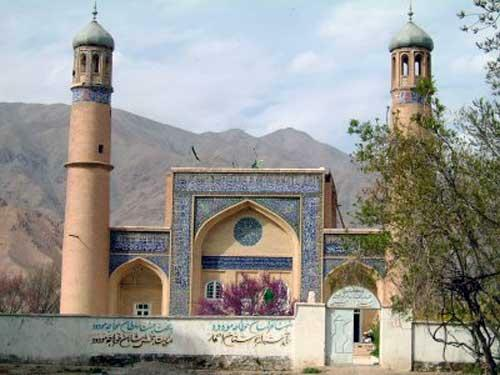

- Location within Afghanistan
- Coordinates: 34°20′50″N 63°44′23″E
- Country: Afghanistan
- Province: Herat
- District: Chishti Sharif
- Elevation: 1,573 m (5,161 ft)

Chishti Sharif (also known as Chisht-e Sharif or Chisht and Chesht) is a town situated on the northern bank of the Hari River in Herat Province, Afghanistan. It is the administrative center of Chishti Sharif District.

== History ==
The Chishti Order of Sufi mystics began in Chishti Sharif about 930 CE. Maudood Chishti is buried there, in a large mausoleum.

Chishti Sharif contains two historic domes (gumbads) built by Ghiyath al-Din Muhammad of the Ghurid dynasty. The eastern dome was damaged by a tank shell at some point during the Afghanistan conflict.

== Climate ==
Chisti Sharif has a warm-summer humid continental climate (Köppen: Dsb). Precipitation mostly falls in spring and winter.

Climate data for Chishti Sharif, Herat Province
Month	Jan	Feb	Mar	Apr	May	Jun	Jul	Aug	Sep	Oct	Nov	Dec	Year
Mean daily maximum °C (°F)	0.9 (33.6)	2.3 (36.1)	8.4 (47.1)	15.1 (59.2)	20.8 (69.4)	26.2 (79.2)	28.9 (84.0)	27.4 (81.3)	22.9 (73.2)	16.5 (61.7)	9.7 (49.5)	4.6 (40.3)	15.3 (59.6)
Daily mean °C (°F)	−5.1 (22.8)	−3.4 (25.9)	2.1 (35.8)	8.2 (46.8)	12.6 (54.7)	17.1 (62.8)	19.8 (67.6)	18.0 (64.4)	12.8 (55.0)	7.3 (45.1)	1.8 (35.2)	−1.8 (28.8)	7.5 (45.4)
Mean daily minimum °C (°F)	−11.1 (12.0)	−9.1 (15.6)	−4.2 (24.4)	1.4 (34.5)	4.4 (39.9)	8.0 (46.4)	10.7 (51.3)	8.6 (47.5)	2.8 (37.0)	−1.9 (28.6)	−6.1 (21.0)	−8.2 (17.2)	−0.4 (31.3)
Average precipitation mm (inches)	56 (2.2)	71 (2.8)	87 (3.4)	64 (2.5)	37 (1.5)	12 (0.5)	4 (0.2)	6 (0.2)	0 (0)	7 (0.3)	21 (0.8)	46 (1.8)	411 (16.2)
Average relative humidity (%)	63	64	61	57	47	35	32	31	33	41	48	59	48
Source: weather2visit.com

== Gallery ==
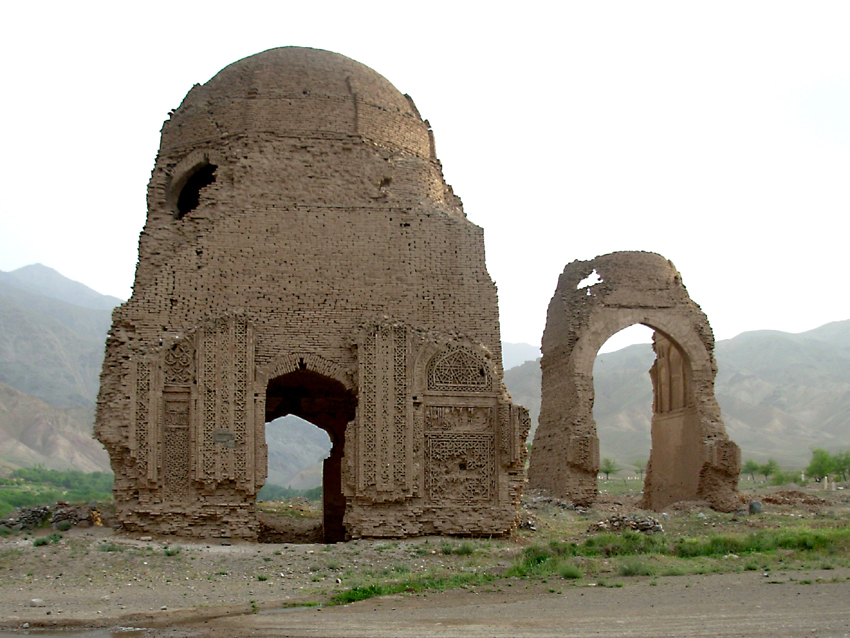
Domes of Chishti Sharif
