= Chishti (surname) =

Chishti or Chishty is a toponymic surname (nisba) from Chisht in Afghanistan. It is used by people claiming ancestry from Moinuddin Chishti or association with his Chishti Order of Sufism.

== Notable people ==
- Abu Aḥmad Abdal Chishti, founder of the Chishti Order
- Abu Muḥammad Chishti, disciple of Abu Aḥmad Abdal Chishti
- Ata Hussain Fani Chishti, 19th-century Indian Sufi saint of Gaya, Bihar
- Bande Nawaz or Khwaja Syed Muhammad al-Hussaini Chishti, 14th and 15th-century Indian Sufi saint
- Dhruv Sangari or Bilal Chishty Sangari, Indian Sufi singer
- Faiz Ali Chishti (1927–2024), Pakistani general
- Fariduddin Ganjshakar or Shaik Fareeduddin Ganjshakar Chishti, 12th-century Sufi poet and mystic from Punjab
- Ghulam Ahmed Chishti, Pakistani music composer
- Islam Khan Chishti, Mughal governor of Bengal
- Karim Chishti, Indian cricketer
- Khwaja Abdullah Chishti, 16th-century Indian Sufi saint
- Maudood Chishti, Sufi saint of the Chishti Order
- Miya Khan Chishti, qadi of the Gujarat Sultanate in India, buried at Miya Khan Chishti's Mosque
- Mohammad Badshah Qadri or Syed Mohammad Badshah Qadri-ul-Chishti Yamani Raichuri, 20th-century Indian Sufi saint
- Mohammad Farooq Chishti, Indian politician
- Mu'in al-Din Chishti, most prominent Sufi saint and mystic of the Chishti Order
- Mukarram Khan Chishti, Mughal governor of Bengal
- Nasiruddin Chiragh Dehlavi or Khwaja Nasiruddin Mahmud Chishti, Indian Sufi saint of the Chishti Order from Delhi
- Qamar-ul-Zaman Faridi Chishti, Pakistani Sufi saint of the Chishti Order
- Qasim Khan Chishti, Mughal governor of Bengal, brother of Islam Khan
- Ṛta Kapur Chishti, Indian textile scholar and historian
- Rehman Chishti, UK Member of Parliament
- Salim Chishti, Sufi saint of the Chishti Order during the Mughal Empire in India
- Sardar Ahmad Chishti, Pakistani Sufi saint, jurist, author and debater
- S. R. Chishti, Indian musician
- Tajuddin Chishti, Sufi saint of Chishti Order in Chishtian, Punjab
- Unwan Chishti, Indian Urdu poet
- Waheed and Naveed Chishti, Pakistani qawwali singers and Quranic reciters
- Yousaf Saleem Chishti, Pakistani scholar and writer
