= Abu Ishaq Shami =

Syrian Sufi and Chishti order founder (died 940)

- Died: 940; Damascus
- Influences: Khwaja Mumshad Uluw Al Dīnawarī
- Influenced: Abu Aḥmad Abdal Chishti

Abu Ishaq Shami (ابو اسحاق شامی چشتی; died 940) was a Muslim scholar who is often regarded as the founder of the Sufi Chishti Order. He was the first in the Chishti lineage (silsila) to live in Chisht and to adopt the name "Chishti", so that, if the Chishti order itself dates back to him, it is one of the oldest recorded Sufi orders. His original name, Shami, implies he came from Syria (ash-Sham). He died in Damascus and lies buried on Mount Qasiyun, where Ibn Arabi was later buried.

== Masters and students ==
Abu Ishaq Shami's teacher was Mumshad Al-Dinawari, whose own teacher was Abu Hubayra al-Basri, a disciple of Huzaifah Al-Mar'ashi who was in turn a disciple of Ibrahim ibn Adham (Abu Ben Adhem In the western tradition.) The Chishtiyyah silsila continued through Abu Ishaq Shami's disciple Abu Aḥmad Abdal Chishti. In South Asia, Moinuddin Chishti, whose silsila goes back to Abu Ishaq Shami, was the founding father who brought Chishti teaching to the region.

== See also ==
- Sufism
