= Pastoral society =

Social group of pastoralists

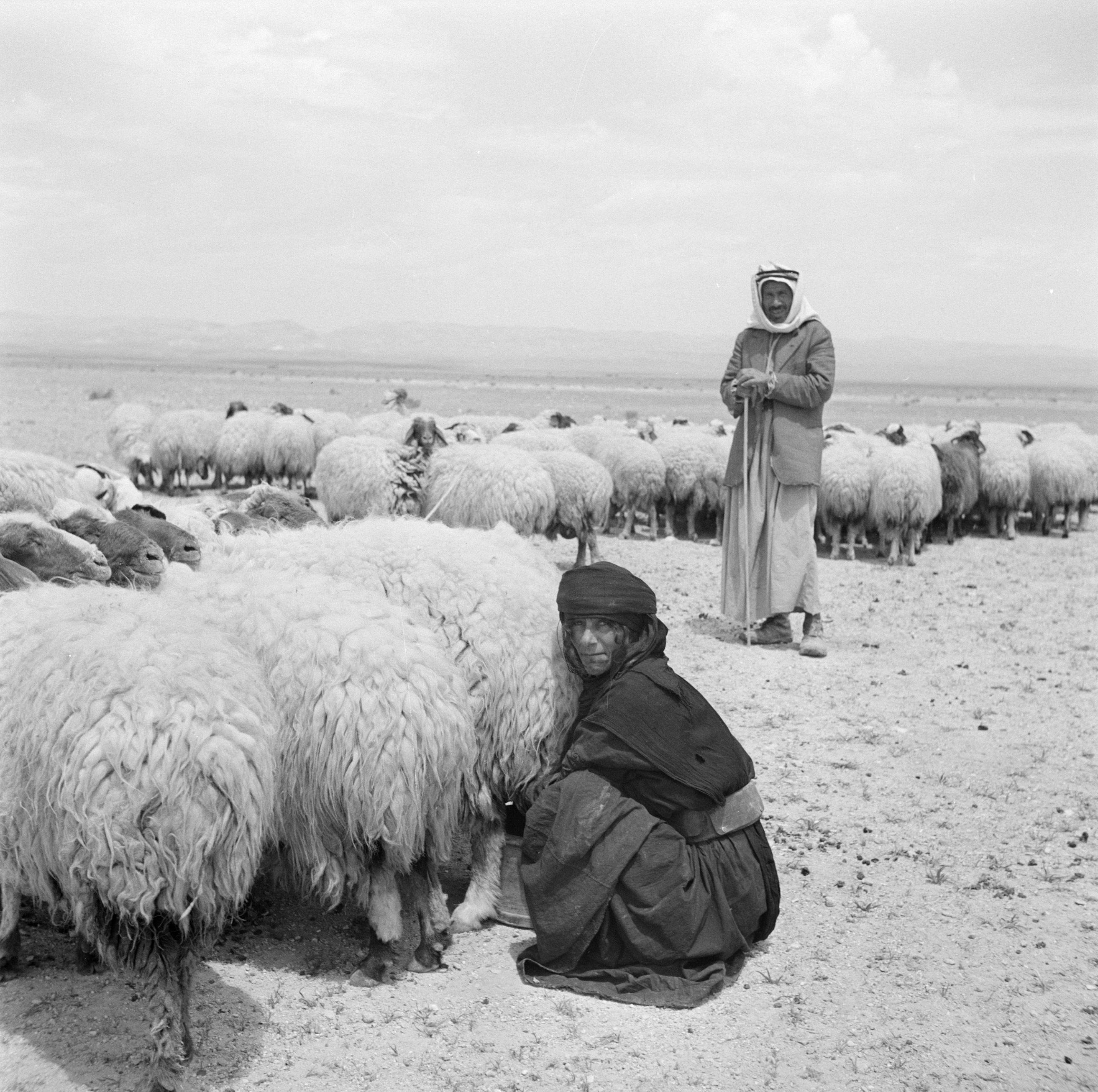
Bedouins in Syria in the 1950s

A pastoral society is a social group of pastoralists, whose way of life is based on pastoralism, and is typically nomadic. Daily life is centered upon the tending of herds or flocks.

== Social organization ==
There is not an explicit form of the social organization associated with pastoralism. Pastoral societies are often organized in tribes, with the ‘household,' often incorporating the extended family, as a basic unit for organization of labor and expenses. Lineages are often the root for property rights. Mobility allows groups of pastoralists to leave and regroup as resources permit, or as sought after with changes in social relations.

== Cross-border pastoralism ==
Sometimes pastoralists move their herds across international borders in search of new grazing or for trade. This cross-border activity can occasionally lead to tensions with national governments as this activity is often informal and beyond their control and regulation. In East Africa, for example, over 95% of cross-border trade is through unofficial channels and the unofficial trade of live cattle, camels, sheep and goats from Ethiopia sold to Somalia, Kenya and Djibouti generates an estimated total value of between US$250 and US$300 million annually (100 times more than the official figure). This trade helps lower food prices, increase food security, relieve border tensions and promote regional integration. However, there are also risks as the unregulated and undocumented nature of this trade runs risks, such as allow disease to spread more easily across national borders. Furthermore, governments are unhappy with lost tax revenue and foreign exchange revenues.

There have been initiatives seeking to promote cross-border trade and also document it, in order to both stimulate regional growth and food security, but also allow the effective vaccination of livestock. Initiatives include Regional Resilience Enhancement Against Drought (RREAD), the Enhanced Livelihoods in Mandera Triangle/Enhanced Livelihoods in Southern Ethiopia (ELMT/ELSE) as part of the Regional Enhanced Livelihoods in Pastoral Areas (RELPA) programme in East Africa, and the Regional Livelihoods Advocacy Project (REGLAP) funded by the European Commission Humanitarian Aid Office (ECHAO).

== Examples of pastoral societies ==
=== Traditional ===
==== North & Northeast Africa ====
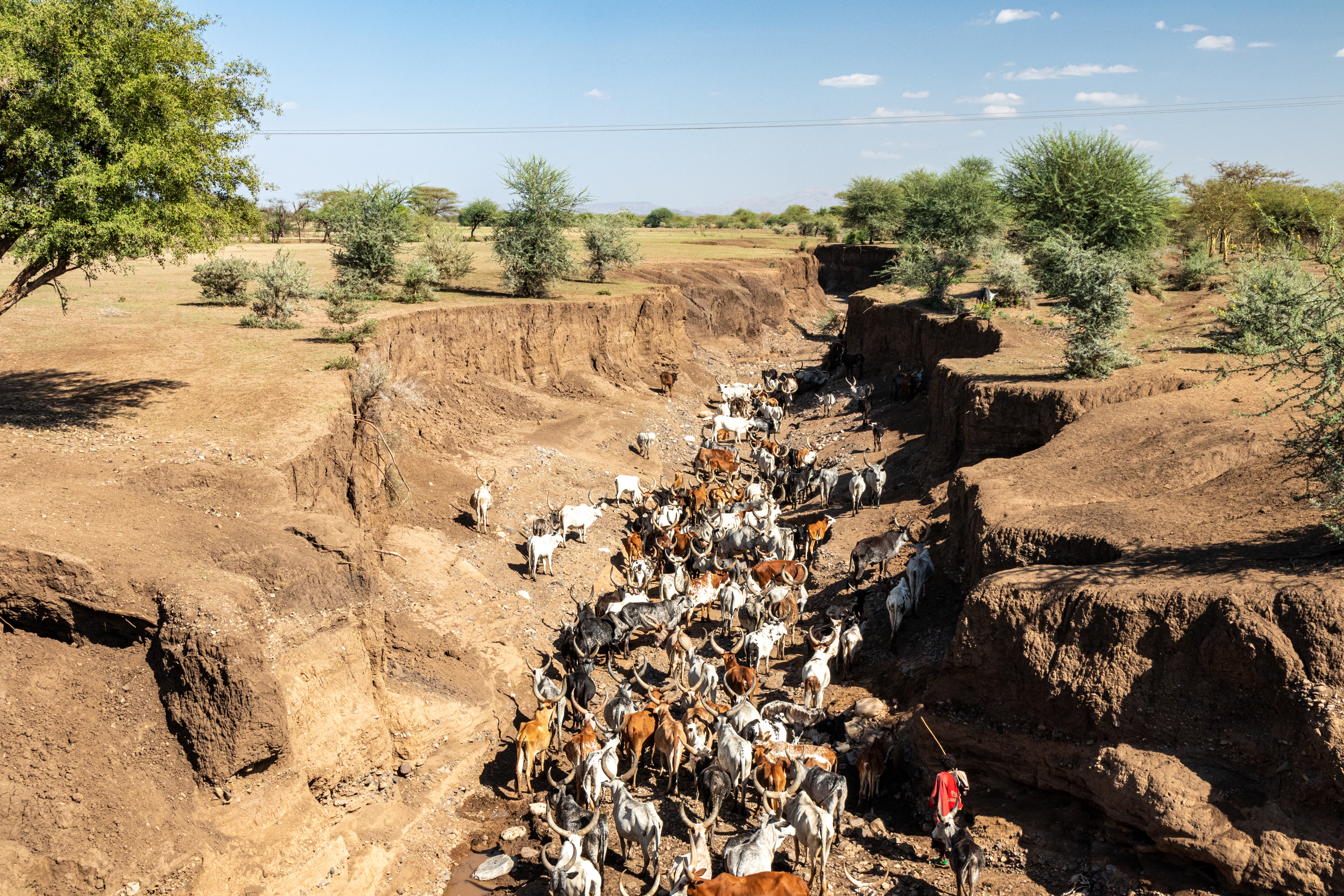
Cattle herd in riverbed of Afar Region

- Afar of the Horn of Africa
- Bedouin of West Africa and the Arabian Peninsula
- Beja of North Africa and the Horn of Africa
- Oromos of the Horn of Africa
- Rendille of the Horn of Africa
- Saho of the Horn of Africa
- Somalis of the Horn of Africa
- Tigre of the Horn of Africa
- Tuareg of the north-central Sahara
- Northern Songhai camel herders of Central Sahara

==== Sahel ====
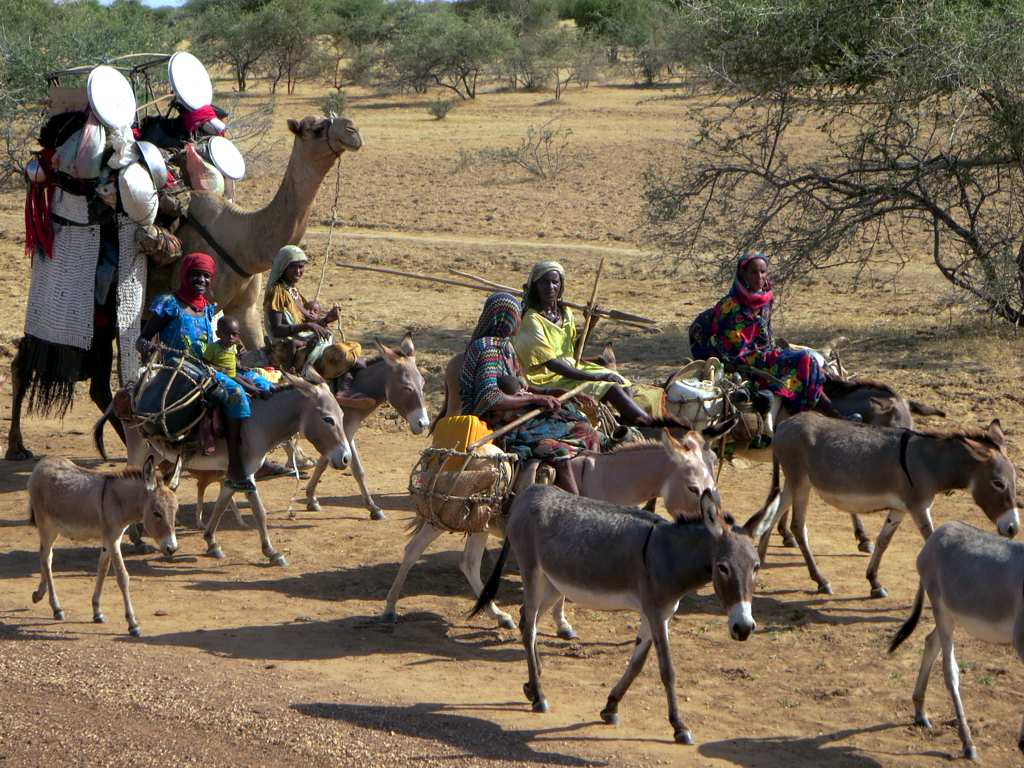
Movement of nomads in Chad

- Fula people of Sahelian West Africa
- Toubou of Niger and Chad

==== Sub-Equatorial Africa ====
- Karimojong of Uganda
- Maasai of East Africa
- Pokot of East Africa
- Samburu of East Africa
- Turkana of East Africa
- Zulu people of South Africa

==== Near East ====
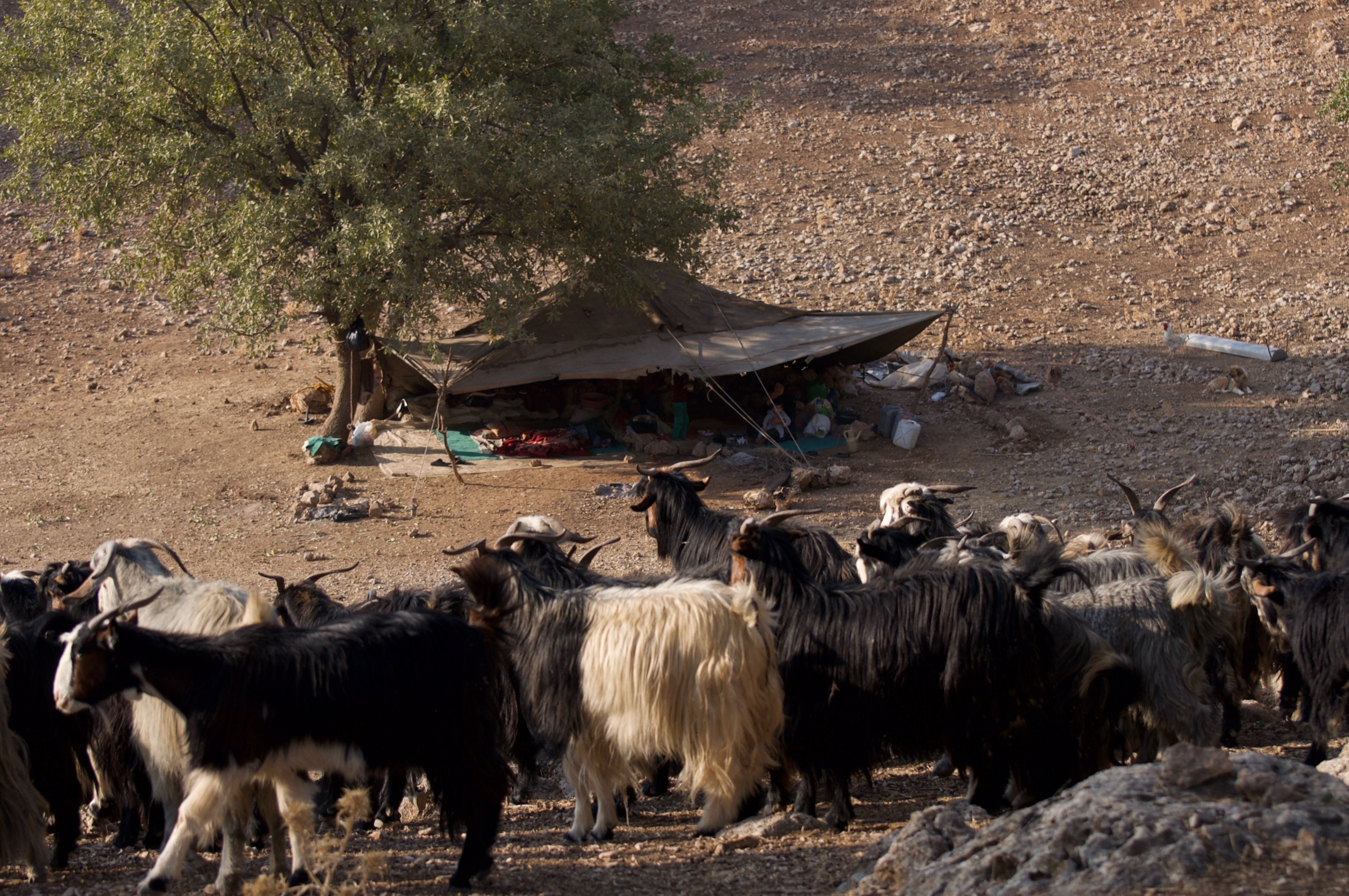
Bakhtiari nomad camp in the Zagros Mountains

- Kuchis of Afghanistan
- Yörük of Turkey
- Bakhtiaris of Iran
- Qashqai of Iran

==== South Asia ====
- Ahir found throughout North India
- Bakarwal found in Jammu and Kashmir
- Bharwad in bengal
- Bhutia in north India and Nepal
- Bodla found in Pakistani Punjab
- Charan in Gir(Gujarat)
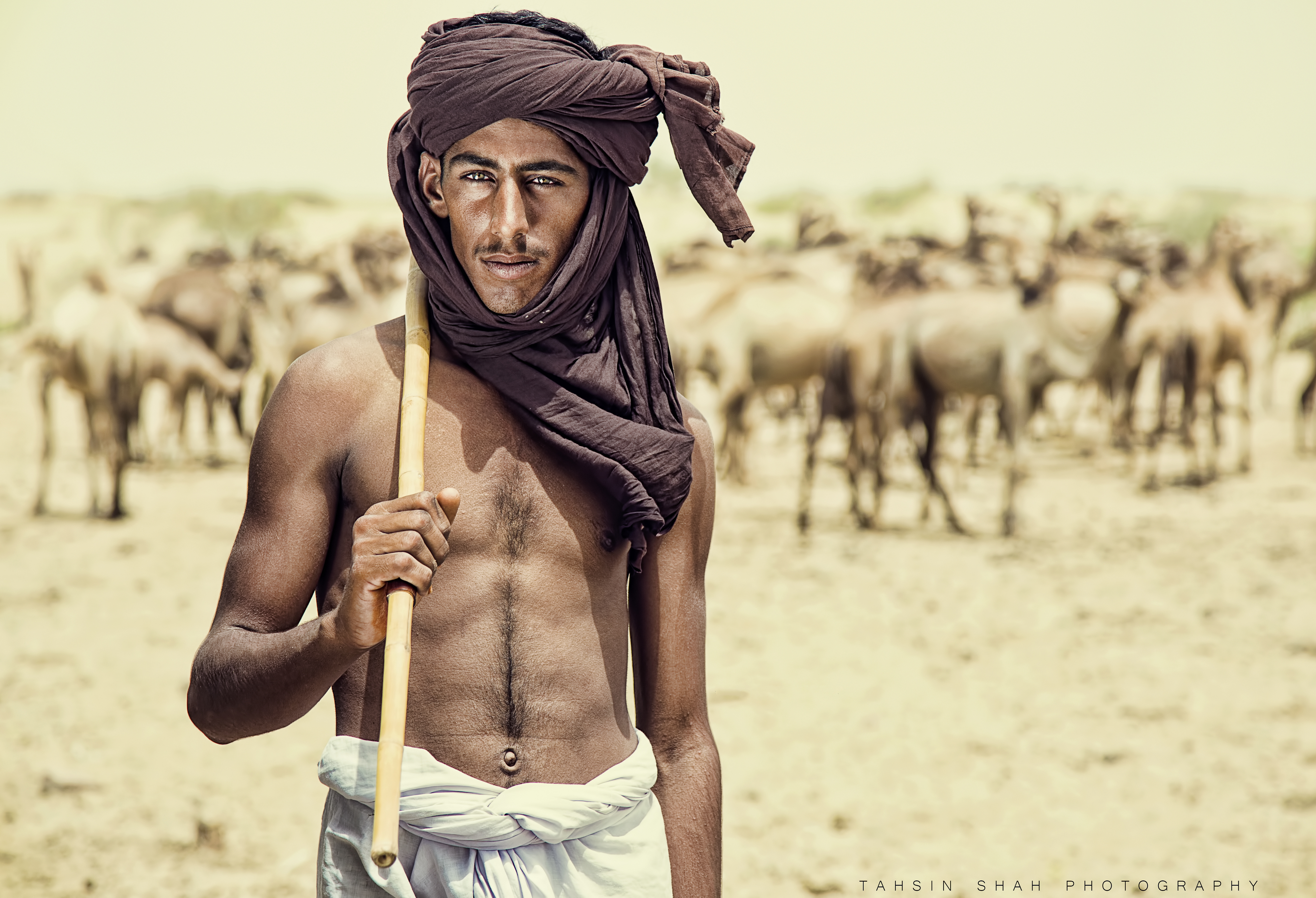
  Camel grazers in the Thar Desert
- Chishti found in Pakistani Punjab
- Dhangar found in Maharashtra, MP
- Gaddi of Himachal Pradesh
- Maldhari of Gujarat
- Muslim Gaddi
- Gaderia in UP and MP
- Ghosi
- Gurjar found in North India, Afghanistan and Pakistan
- Kuruba found in South India
- Kurma found in South India
- Rabari of Gujarat, Rajasthan and panjab
- Ranghar found in North India and Pakistan
- Sherpa in Nepal
- Wattu found in Pakistani Punjab
- Raika found in Rajasthan

==== Central Asia ====
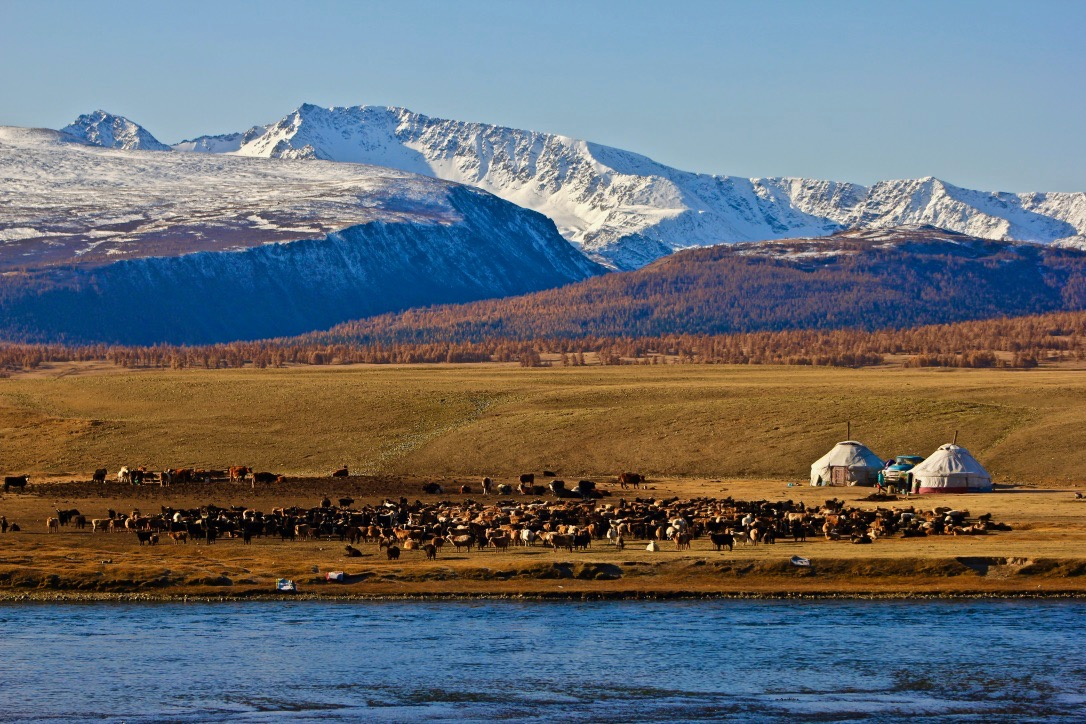
Pastoral nomads in Mongolia

- Tuvans of Mongolia

==== Southern Europe ====
- Aromanians of Balkans
- Sarakatsani of Greece
- Vaqueiros de alzada of Spain

==== Northern Europe ====
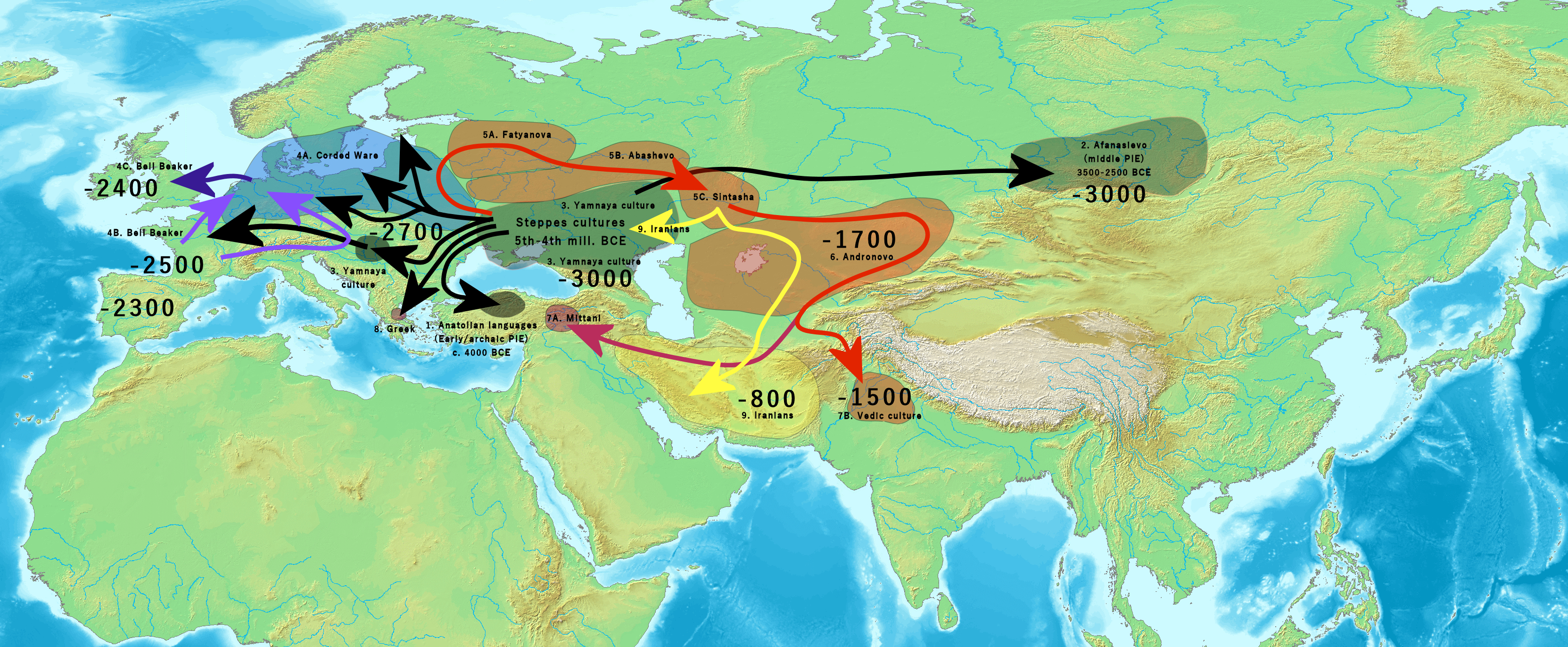
Bronze Age spread of Yamnaya Steppe pastoralist ancestry and culture from c. 3000 to 800 BC

- Komi of northern Russia
- Proto-Indo-Europeans of Pontic–Caspian steppe
- Sami of Scandinavia

==== North America ====
- Navajo of North America

==== South America ====
- Quechua of The Andes region
- Aymara of The Andes and Altiplano regions

=== Modern ===
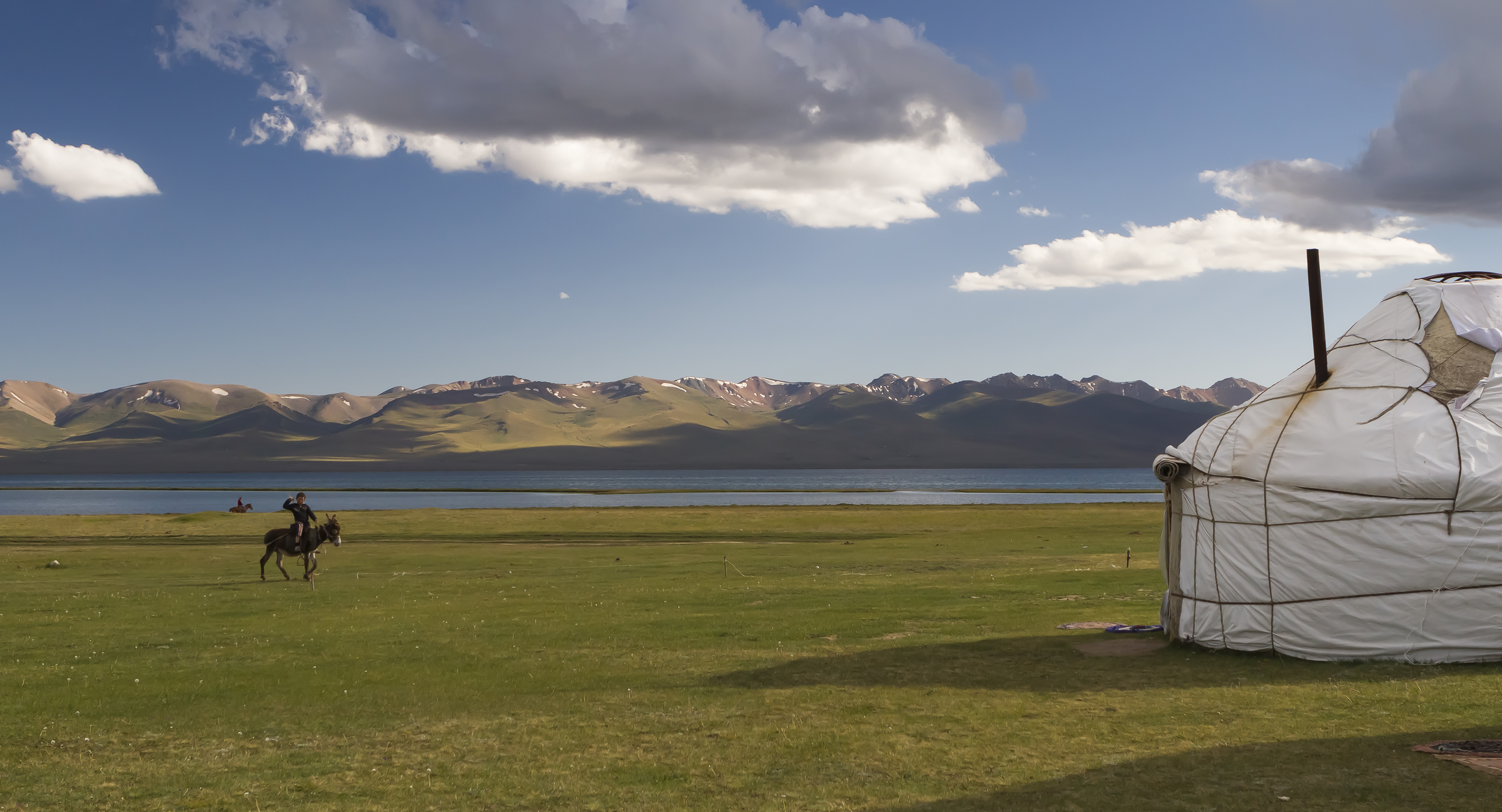
Yurt camp on north shore of lake Son Kol, Kyrgyzstan

One of the consequences of the break-up of the Soviet Union and the subsequent political independence and economic collapse of its Central Asian republics is the resurgence of pastoral nomadism. Taking the Kyrgyz people as a representative example, nomadism was the centre of their economy prior to Russian colonization at the turn of the C19/C20, when they were settled into agricultural villages. The population became increasingly urbanized after World War II, but some people continued to take their herds of horses and cows to the high pasture (jailoo) every summer. Since the 1990s, as the cash economy shrank, unemployed relatives were absorbed back on the family farm, and the importance of this form of nomadism has increased. The symbols of nomadism, specifically the crown of the grey felt tent known as the yurt, appears on the national flag, emphasizing the centrality of their nomadic history and past in the creation of the modern nation of Kyrgyzstan.

== See also ==
- Hunter-gatherer society
- Agrarian society
