= Ishq-Nuri Tariqa =

The Ishq-Nuri Tariqa or Ishq-Nuri Sufi Order is a branch or offshoot of the famous, and much older Chistiyya Sufi mystical teaching order, or system

== Origins ==
The Order was founded by the Chishti Sufi sage and shaykh (master/teacher) Khwaja Khalid Mahmood Siddiqui al-Chishti in the late 1960s in the city of Lahore, Pakistan. The founder was a sage initiated originally in the Chishti-Nizami section of the traditional Chishti Order, who felt that a more modern, and 'contemporaneous expression' of the teachings of this system was needed. The Ishq-Nuri order sought to make Ishq—Divine Love—as its essential teaching basis and in this, reflected many of the ideas of earlier Sufi sages and saints like Khwaja Moinuddin Chishti and Baba Farid as well as other universal Sufis masters such as Rumi, Hakim Sanai and others. A broad, universal love and thankfulness, remains one of the key tenets of the order's teaching.

== Practice ==
The Ishq-Nuri continue to practice on a small scale within South Asia only, mostly within Pakistan, India and Bangladesh. It is believed that some people in Europe and parts of the Middle East are now also starting to follow this order

== See also ==
- Mysticism
- Sufism
- Sufism in India
- Sufism in Pakistan
