= Mu'in al-Din Chishti =

Persian Islamic scholar and mystic (1143–1236)

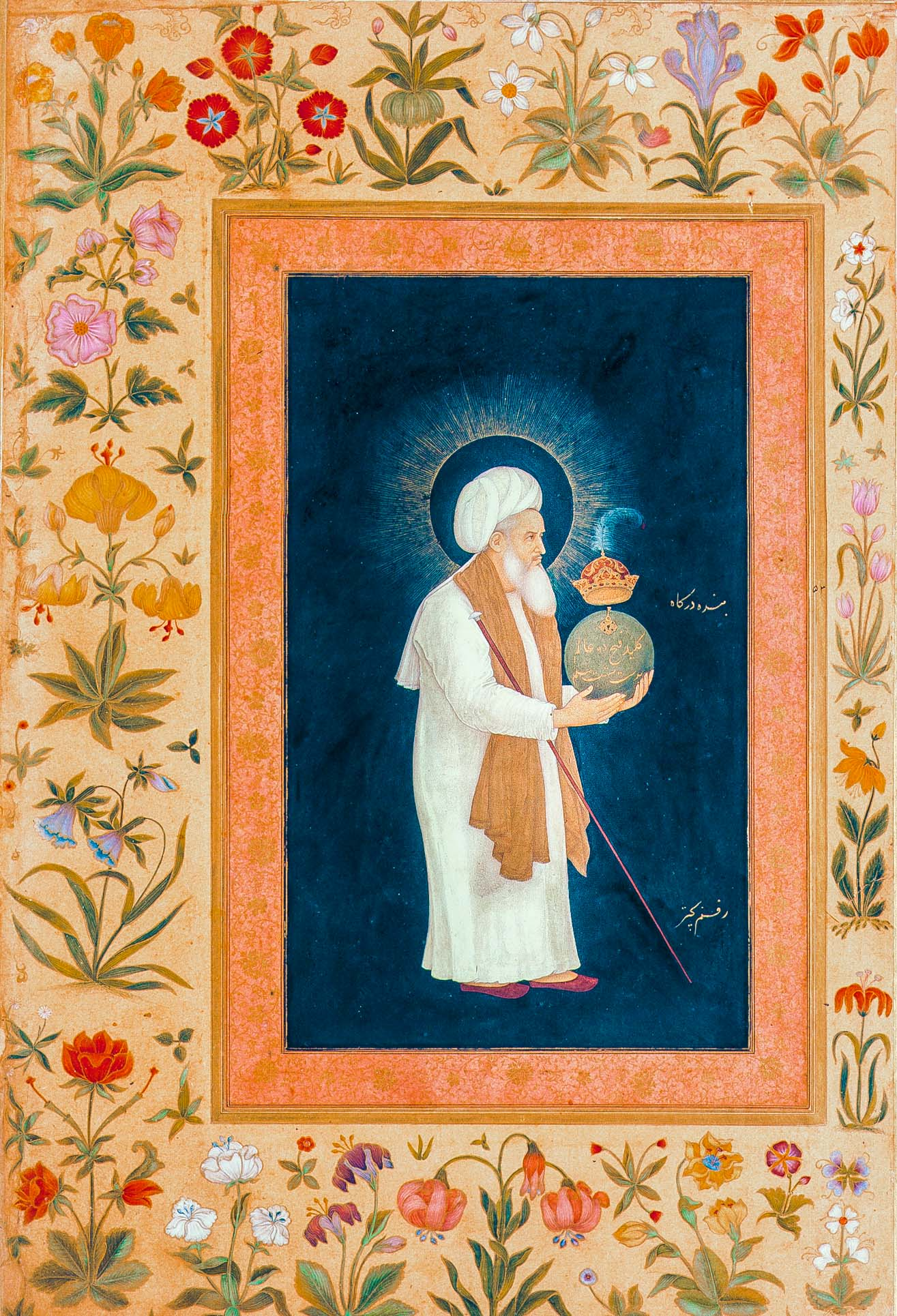
- A Mughal miniature representing Muʿīn al-Dīn Chishtī
- Title: Khwaja

Personal life
- Born: Sayyid Muinuddin Hasan; 1 February 1143 Sistan, Nasrid kingdom
- Died: 15 March 1236 (aged 93) Ajmer, Delhi Sultanate
- Resting place: Ajmer Sharif Dargah
- Flourished: Islamic golden age
- Children: Three sons—Abū Saʿīd, Fak̲h̲r al-Dīn and Ḥusām al-Dīn — and one daughter Bībī Jamāl.
- Parent(s): Khwāja G̲h̲iyāt̲h̲ al-Dīn Ḥasan, Umm al-Wara
- Other names: Khwaja Gharib Nawaz, Sultan E Hind, Khwaja Moinuddin Chishti, Khwaja-e-Khwajgan, Khwaja Ajmeri

Religious life
- Religion: Islam
- Denomination: Sunni
- Jurisprudence: Hanafi
- Tariqa: Chishti
- Creed: Maturidi
- Profession: Islamic preacher

Muslim leader
- Influenced by: Usman Harooni, ʿAbdullah Ansari, Abdul Qadir Gilani Najīb al-Dīn Nakhshabī
- Influenced: Qutbuddin Bakhtiar Kaki. Muḥammad Mubārak al-ʿAlavī al-Kirmānī, Ḥāmid b. Faḍlallāh Jamālī, Abd al-Haqq al-Dehlawi, Ḥamīd al-Dīn Ṣūfī Nāgawrī, Fakhr al-Dīn Chishtī,Ahmed Raza Khan Barelvi, and virtually all subsequent mystics of the Chishtiyya order

Mu'in al-Din Hasan Chishti Sijzi (Persian: معین الدین چشتی, romanized: Muʿīn al-Dīn Chishtī; 1 February 1143 – 15 March 1236), known reverentially as Khawaja Gharib Nawaz (Persian: خواجه غریب نواز, romanized: Khawāja Gharīb Nawāz), was a Persian Sayyid Islamic scholar and mystic from Sistan, who eventually ended up settling in the Indian subcontinent in the early 13th-century, where he promulgated the Chishtiyya order of Islamic mysticism. This particular Tariqa (order) became the dominant Islamic spiritual order in medieval India. Most of the Indian Sunni saints are Chishti in their affiliation, including Nizamuddin Awliya (d. 1325) and Amir Khusrow (d. 1325).

Having arrived in the Delhi Sultanate during the reign of the Sultan Iltutmish (d. 1236), Muʿīn al-Dīn moved from Delhi to Ajmer shortly thereafter, at which point he became increasingly influenced by the writings of the Sunni Hanbali scholar and mystic ʿAbdallāh Anṣārī (d. 1088), whose work on the lives of the early Islamic saints, the Ṭabāqāt al-ṣūfiyya, may have played a role in shaping Muʿīn al-Dīn's worldview. It was during his time in Ajmer that Muʿīn al-Dīn acquired the reputation of being a charismatic and compassionate spiritual preacher and teacher; and biographical accounts of his life written after his death report that he received the gifts of many "spiritual marvels (karāmāt), such as miraculous travel, clairvoyance, and visions of angels" in these years of his life. Muʿīn al-Dīn seems to have been unanimously regarded as a great saint after his death.

Muʿīn al-Dīn Chishtī's legacy rests primarily on his having been "one of the most outstanding figures in the annals of Islamic mysticism." Additionally, Muʿīn al-Dīn Chishtī is also notable, according to John Esposito, for having been one of the first major Islamic mystics to formally allow his followers to incorporate the "use of music" in their devotions, liturgies, and hymns to God, which he did in order to make the 'foreign' Arab faith more relatable to the indigenous peoples who had recently entered the religion.

== Early life ==
From Persia, whose ancestors were Arab Sayyids who settled there, Muʿīn al-Dīn Chishtī was born in 1143 in Sistan. He was sixteen years old when his father, Sayyid G̲h̲iyāt̲h̲ al-Dīn (d. c. 1155), died, leaving his grinding mill and orchard to his son.

Despite planning to continue his father's business, he developed mystic tendencies in his personal piety and soon entered a life of destitute itineracy. He enrolled at the seminaries of Bukhara and Samarkand, and (probably) visited the shrines of Muhammad al-Bukhari (d. 870) and Abu Mansur al-Maturidi (d. 944), two widely venerated figures in the Islamic world.

While traveling to Iran, in the district of Nishapur, he came across the Sunni mystic Ḵh̲wāj̲a ʿUt̲h̲mān, who initiated him. Accompanying his spiritual guide for over twenty years on the latter's journeys from region to region, Muʿīn al-Dīn also continued his own independent spiritual travels during the time period. It was on his independent wanderings that Muʿīn al-Dīn encountered many of the most notable Sunni mystics of the era, including Abdul-Qadir Gilani (d. 1166) and Najmuddin Kubra (d. 1221), as well as Naj̲īb al-Dīn ʿAbd al-Ḳāhir Suhrawardī, Abū Saʿīd Tabrīzī, and ʿAbd al-Waḥid G̲h̲aznawī (all d. c. 1230), all of whom were destined to become some of the most highly venerated saints in the Sunni tradition.

== South Asia ==
Arriving in South Asia in the early thirteenth century along with his cousin and spiritual successor Khwaja Syed Fakhr Al-Dīn Gardezi Chishti, Muʿīn al-Dīn first travelled to Lahore to meditate at the tomb-shrine of the Sunni mystic and jurist Ali Hujwiri (d. 1072).

From Lahore, he continued towards Ajmer, where he settled and married the daughter of Saiyad Wajiuddin, whom he married in the year 1209/10. He went on to have three sons—Abū Saʿīd, Fak̲h̲r al-Dīn and Ḥusām al-Dīn — and one daughter, Bībī Jamāl. After settling in Ajmer, Muʿīn al-Dīn strove to establish the Chishti order of Sunni mysticism in India; many later biographic accounts relate the numerous miracles wrought by God at the hands of the saint during this period.

=== Preaching in India ===
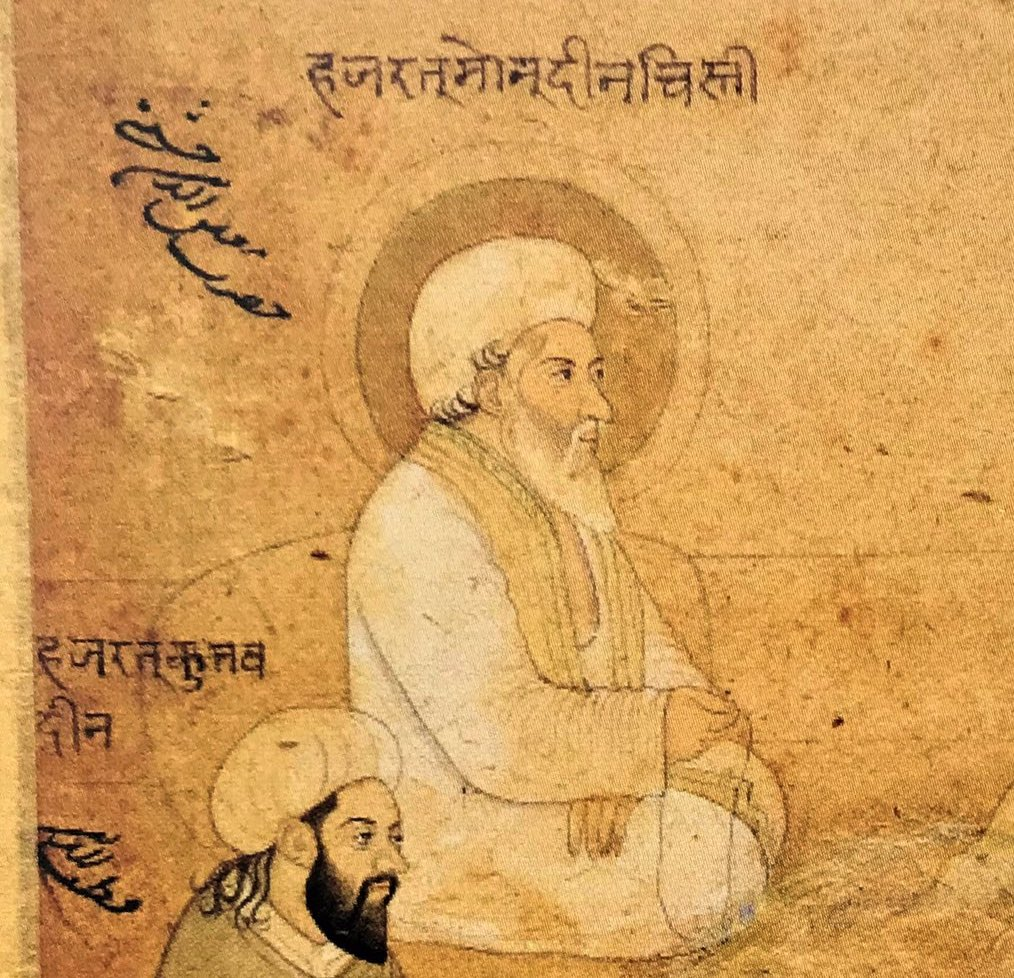
Detail of Hazrat Muin-ud-Din from a Guler painting showing an imaginary meeting of Sufi saints

Muʿīn al-Dīn Chishtī was not the originator or founder of the Chishtiyya order of mysticism as he is often erroneously thought to be. On the contrary, the Chishtiyya was already an established Sufi order prior to his birth, being originally an offshoot of the older Adhamiyya order that traced its spiritual lineage and titular name to the early Islamic saint and mystic Ibrahim ibn Adham (d. 782). Thus, this particular branch of the Adhamiyya was renamed the Chishtiyya after the 10th-century Sunni mystic Abū Isḥāq al-Shāmī (d. 942) migrated to Chishti Sharif, a town in the present day Herat Province of Afghanistan in around 930, in order to preach Islam in that area about 148 years prior to the birth of the founder of the Qadiriyya sufi order, Shaikh Abdul Qadir Gilani. The order spread into the Indian subcontinent, however, at the hands of the Persian Muʿīn al-Dīn in the 13th-century, after the saint is believed to have had a dream in which the Islamic prophet Muhammad appeared and told him to be his "representative" or "envoy" in India.

According to the various chronicles, Muʿīn al-Dīn's tolerant and compassionate behavior towards the local population seems to have been one of the major reasons behind conversion to Islam at his hand. Muʿīn al-Dīn Chishtī is said to have appointed Bakhtiar Kaki (d. 1235) as his spiritual successor, who worked at spreading the Chishtiyya in Delhi. Furthermore, Muʿīn al-Dīn's son, Fakhr al-Dīn (d. 1255), is said to have further spread the order's teachings in Ajmer, whilst another of the saint's major disciples, Ḥamīd al-Dīn Ṣūfī Nāgawrī (d. 1274), preached in Nagaur, Rajasthan.

== Spiritual lineage ==
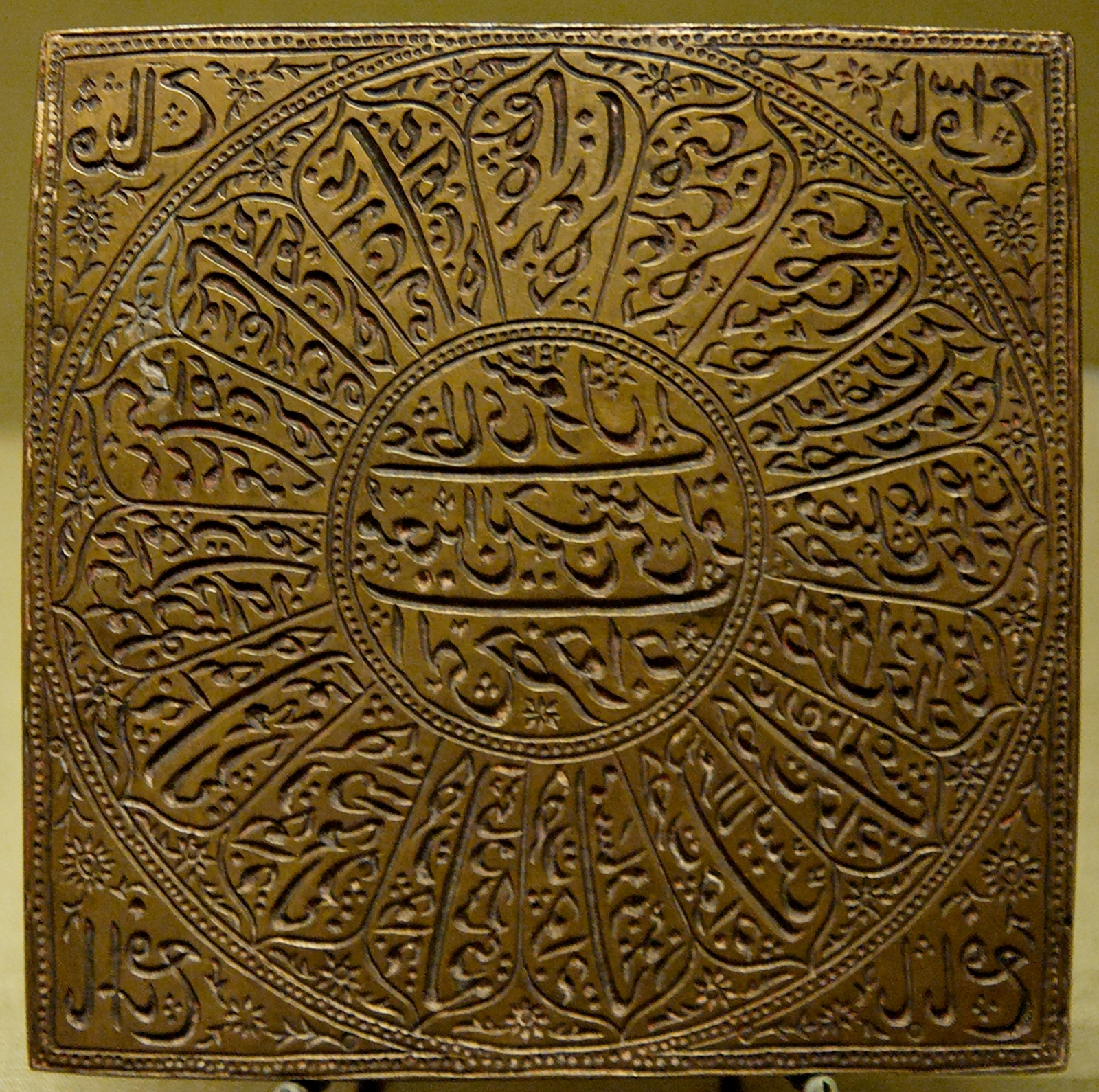
19th century die with the genealogy of the Chishti Order

As with every other major Sufi order, the Chishtiyya proposes an unbroken spiritual chain of transmitted knowledge going back to Muhammad through one of his companions, which in the Chishtiyya's case is Ali (d. 661). His spiritual lineage is traditionally given as follows:

1. Muhammad (570 – 632),
2. ʿAlī b. Abī Ṭālib (600 – 661),
3. Ḥasan al-Baṣrī (d. 728),
4. Abdul Wahid bin Zaid (d. 786),
5. al-Fuḍayl b. ʿIyāḍ (d. 803),
6. Ibrahim ibn Adham al-Balkhī (d. 783),
7. Khwaja Sadid ad-Din Huzaifa al-Marashi (d. 823),
8. Abu Hubayra al-Basri (d. 895),
9. Khwaja Mumshad Uluw Al Dīnawarī (d. 911),
10. Abu Ishaq Shami (d. 941),
11. Abu Aḥmad Abdal Chishti (d. 966),
12. Abu Muḥammad Chishti (d. 1020),
13. Abu Yusuf ibn Saman Muḥammad Samʿān Chishtī (d. 1067),
14. Maudood Chishti (d. 1133),
15. Shareef Zandani (d. 1215),
16. Usman Harooni (d. 1220).

Family Tree / Shajra e Nasab of Hazrat Khwaja Sayyed Moinuddin Hassan Chishti R.A. Engraved on a white marble board in Urdu, Hindi and English Language.

== Dargah Sharif ==
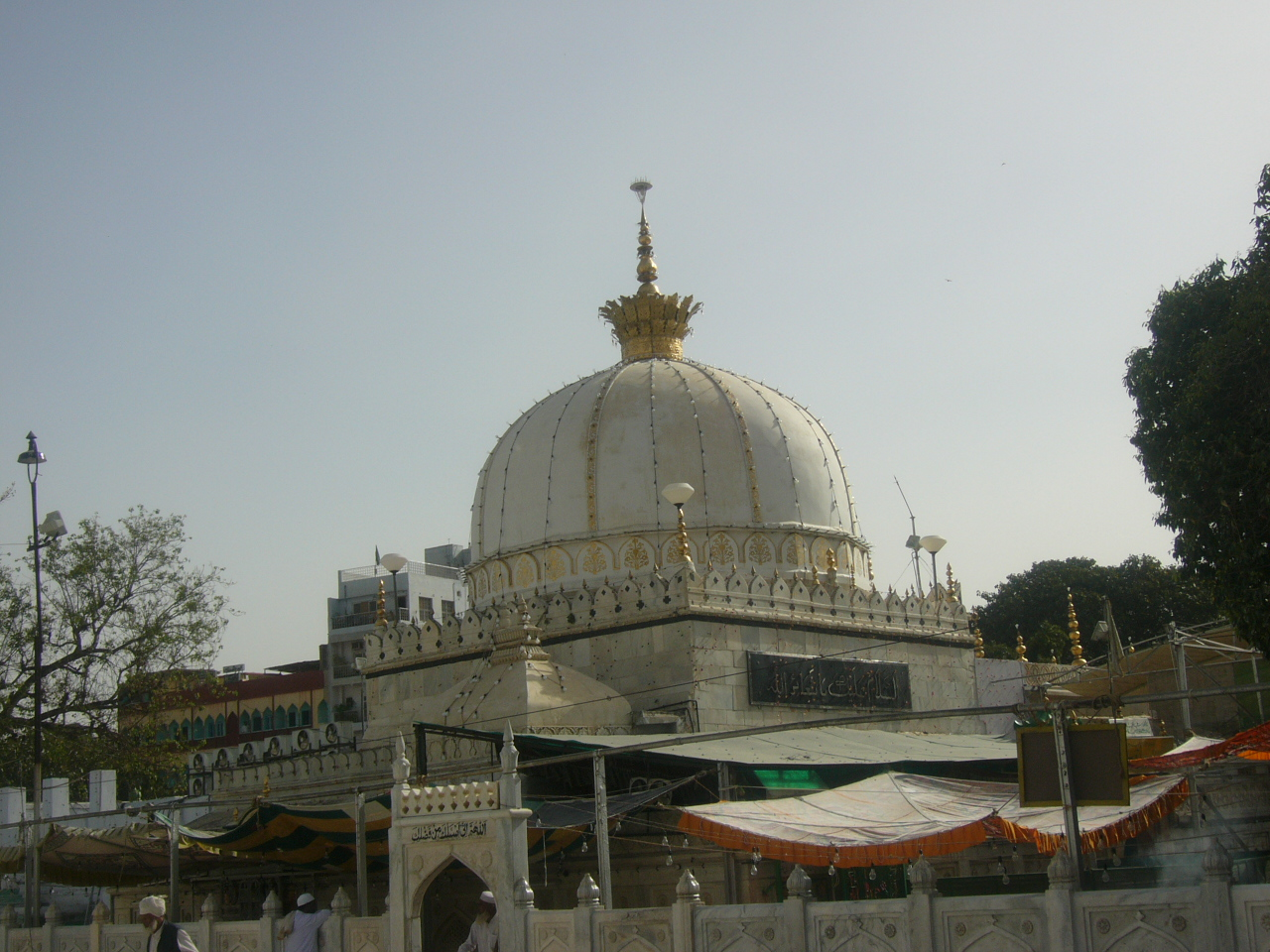
Dargah of Muʿīn al-Dīn Chishtī, Ajmer, Rajasthan, India

The tomb (dargāh) of Muʿīn al-Dīn became a deeply venerated site in the century following the preacher's death in March 1236. Honoured by members of all social classes, the tomb was treated with great respect by many of the era's most important Sunni rulers, including Muhammad bin Tughluq, the Sultan of Delhi from 1324 to 1351, who visited the tomb in 1332 to commemorate the memory of the saint. In a similar way, the later Mughal emperor Akbar (d. 1605) visited the shrine no less than fourteen times during his reign.

In the present day, the tomb of Muʿīn al-Dīn continues to be one of the most popular sites of religious visitation for Sunni Muslims in the Indian subcontinent, with over "hundreds of thousands of people from all over the Indian sub-continent assembling there on the occasion of [the saint's] ʿurs or death anniversary." Additionally, the site also attracts many Hindus, who have also venerated the Islamic saint since the medieval period. A bomb was planted on 11 October 2007 in the Dargah of Sufi Saint Khawaja Moinuddin Chishti at the time of Iftar had left three pilgrims dead and 15 injured. A special National Investigation Agency (NIA) court in Jaipur punished with life imprisonment the two convicts in the 2007 Ajmer Dargah bomb blast case.

== Popular culture ==
Indian films about the saint and his dargah at Ajmer include Mere Gharib Nawaz by G. Ishwar, Sultan E Hind (1973) by K. Sharif, Khawaja Ki Diwani (1981) by Akbar Balam and Mere Data Garib Nawaz (1994) by M Gulzar Sultani. A song in the 2008 Indian film Jodhaa Akbar named "Khwaja Mere Khwaja", composed by A. R. Rahman, pays tribute to Muʿīn al-Dīn Chishtī.

Various qawwalis portray devotion to the saint including Nusrat Fateh Ali Khan's "Khwaja E Khwajgan", Sabri Brothers' "Khawaja Ki Deewani"and Koji Badayuni's "Kabhi rab se Mila Diya".

== See also ==
- Index of Sufism-related articles
- List of Sufis
- Ajmer Dargah bombing
- Ali Hujwiri
- Ata Hussain Fani Chishti
- Alaul Haq Pandavi
- Urs festival, Ajmer

== Sources ==
- Avari, Burjor (2013). Islamic Civilization in South Asia: A history of Muslim power and presence in the Indian subcontinent. Routledge. ISBN 978-0-415-58061-8.
