= Qamar-ul-Zaman Faridi Chishti =

Pakistani Sufi saint (1940–2011)

Baba Qamar U Zaman Faridi Chishti, more commonly known as Sarkar Baba Qamar U Zaman (1940–2011) was a Muslim Saint from the Chishti Order. He was a devoutly religious Sufi, founder and architect of the Chishti Zamani Order. He taught thousands of people across Pakistan and abroad about Islam. The Chisti Order emphasizes "love all and hate none".

He was born on May 30, 1940, in Burj Kalan near Kasoor. His father was a doctor. When he was eight months old, his father died. His mother was a pious and courageous women, she faced all the brunt to bring him up. He studied up to middle school level. Later on joined Education Department and served as a teacher until his retirement in 1993.

== Chishti Doctrine ==
Baba Qamar U Zaman was a murid (disciple) of Baba Farid Ganjshakar, and received all his training on Sufism and Villayat from him, directly through Kashf. After his initial years in Rinala (Okara District), he moved to Raiwind.

=== Zamani Order ===
He stated during his last sermon that a Chishti suborder shall start after him and appointed his youngest son, Fakhar u Zaman Chishti Zamani, as his successor.

== Wisaal Anniversary and Urs ==
His wisaal date is 27th Ramadan, at 0530 hrs, dated August 28, 2011. He was 71 years of age. His wisaal anniversary (Urs) is celebrated for 2 days every year, on the 27 and 28 August at his shrine near Raiwind.

A first edition of Sarkar's Preachings and extracts from his diaries was published in 2012 as Ganjina e Sifat.
