= Tajuddin Chishti =

Sufi saint of 14th century

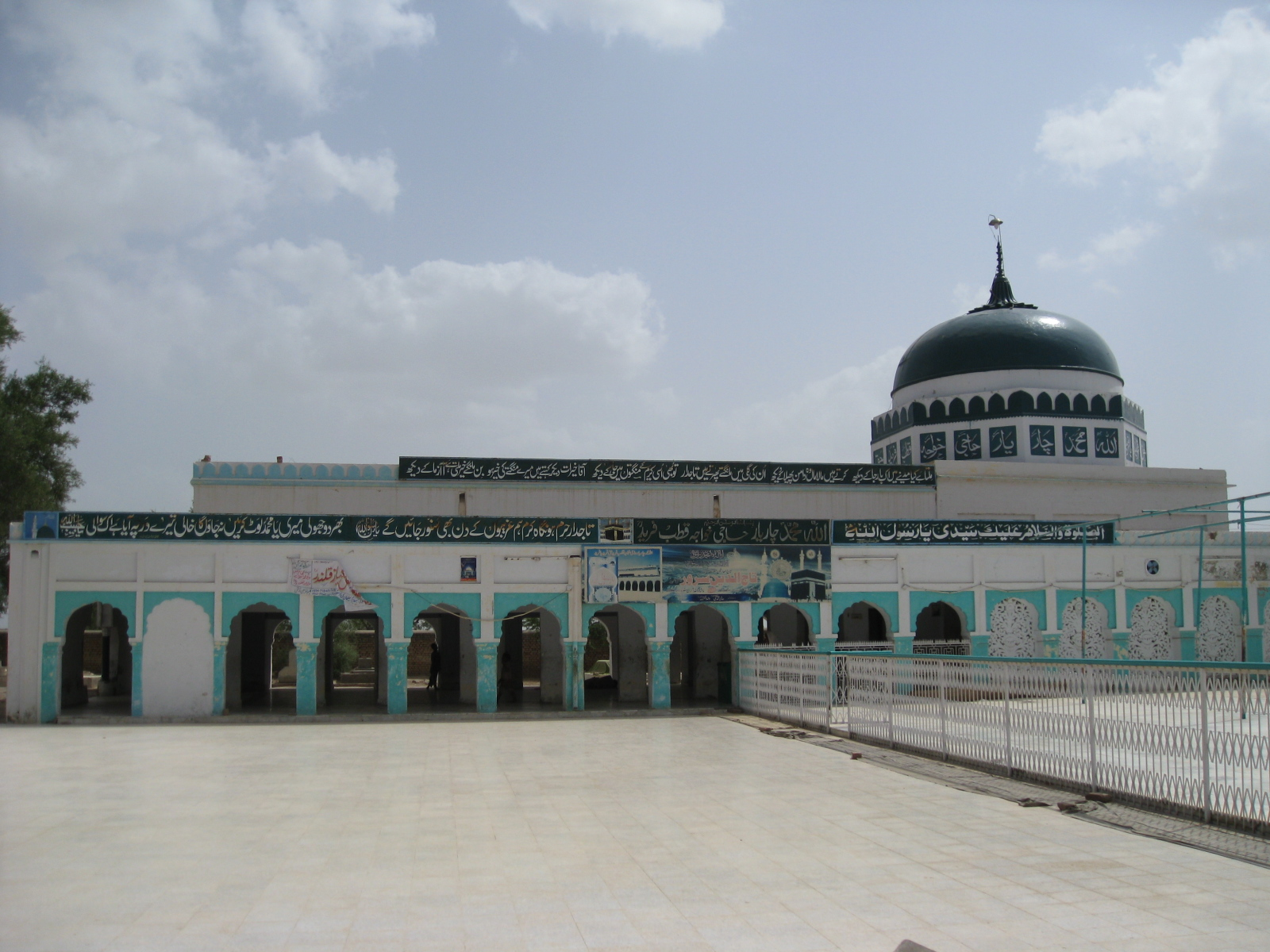
Shrine of Sufi saint Shaikh Khawaja Tajuddin Chishti (14th century), located in the city of Chishtian.

Tajuddin Chishti (Urdu: شیخ خواجه تاج الدين چشتی) also called Taj Sarwar Chishti was a 14th century Sufi saint of Chishti Order in Chishtian, Punjab.

Taj-ud-din Chishti was a grandson Farid-ud-din Ganjshakar (1179 - 1266) of Pakpattan and his descendants founded the village of Chishtian around 1265 CE (574 Hijri, Islamic calendar).

The dargah of Taj-ud-din Chishti is called Roza Taj Sarwar.

Many native tribes in Punjab region accepted Islam due to his missionary Da‘wah. Khawaja Tajuddin Chishti faced hostility from tribes that opposed his Muslim missionary Da‘wah and he was martyred in a battle and was buried in Chishtian.

== Chishti Order ==
The Chishti Order is a Sufi order within the mystic Sufi tradition of Islam. It began in Chisht, a small town near Herat, Afghanistan about 930 CE. The Chishti Order is known for its emphasis on love, tolerance, and openness.

The Chishti Order is primarily followed in Afghanistan and South Asia. It was the first of the four main Sufi orders (Chishti, Qadiriyya, Suhrawardiyya and Naqshbandi) to be established in this region. Moinuddin Chishti (1142 - 1236) introduced the Chishti Order in Lahore (Punjab) and Ajmer (Rajasthan), sometime in the middle of the 12th century AD. He was eighth in the line of succession from the founder of the Chishti Order, Abu Ishaq Shami. There are now several branches of the order, which has been the most prominent South Asian Sufi brotherhood since the 12th century.
