= Miya Khan Chishti's Mosque =

Mosque and tomb in Shahibaug, Ahmedabad, India

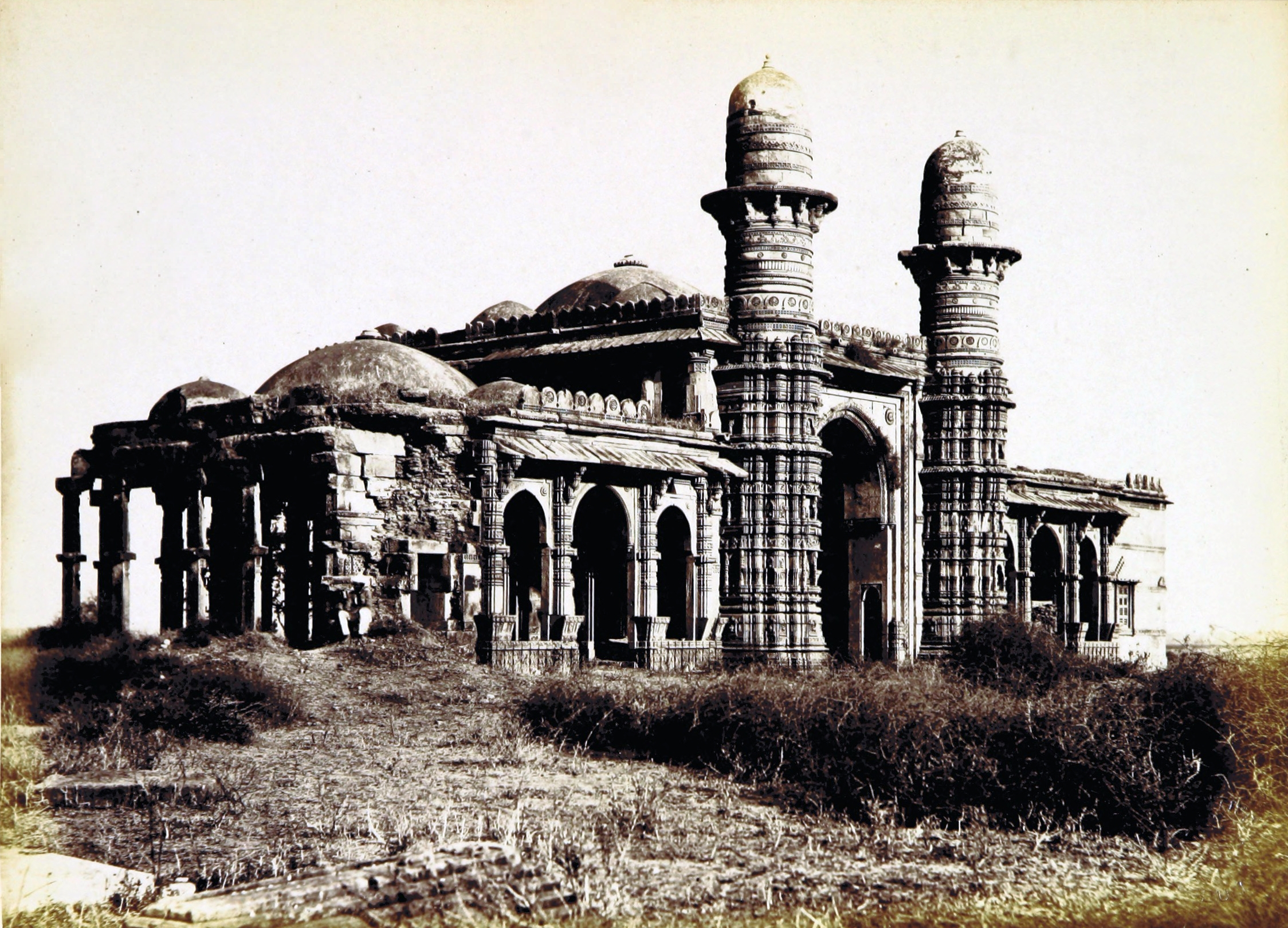
- The mosque in 1866

- Location of the mosque and tomb in Ahmedabad

Religion
- Affiliation: Sunni Islam
- Sect: Sufi Chishti Order
- Ecclesiastical or organisational status: Mosque and dargah
- Status: Active

Location
- Location: Shahibaug, Ahmedabad, Gujarat
- Country: India
- Coordinates: 23°03′37″N 72°35′17″E

Architecture
- Type: Mosque architecture
- Style: Indo-Islamic; Hindu temple
- Funded by: Malik Maksud Vazir
- Completed: 1465

Specifications
- Dome: c. Six (maybe more)
- Minaret: Two (partially damaged)

The Miya Khan Chishti's Mosque, or more correctly, the Miya Khan Chishti's Mosque and Tomb, is a Sufi mosque and dargah complex, located on the bank of Sabarmati River in the Shahibaug area of Ahmedabad, in the state of Gujarat, India.

== History ==
The Miya Khan Chishti's Mosque was built in 1465 by Malik Maksud Vazir, brother of Malik Bahauddin, for Miya Khan Chishti, whose family was the holder of office of city judge or Kazi during Gujarat Sultanate rule. The mosque is maintained by the family of Sardar Kazi Nasiruddin Fariduddin, the Chishty first non-Talukdar Sardar of Gujarat.

== Architecture ==
The mosque is an example of Indo-Islamic architecture which blends Hindu temple architectural elements. There are three main domes surrounded by several smaller domes. The facade has ornated entrance and two minarets with fine stone carvings. Both minarets were damaged in 1819 Rann of Kutch earthquake. The mosque also sustained damage from 2001 Gujarat earthquake.

== Gallery ==
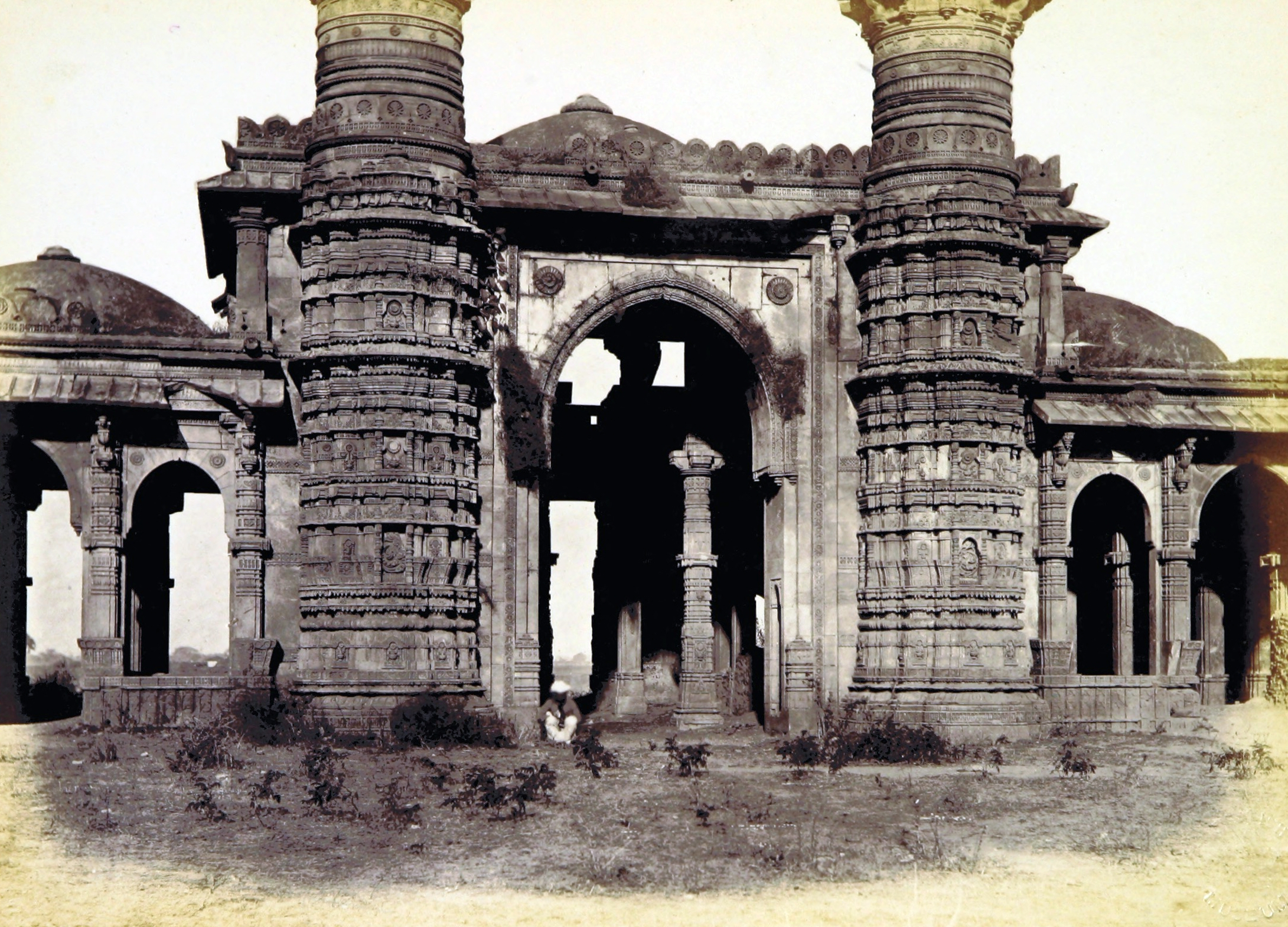
The mosque in 1866

== See also ==
- Islam in India
- List of mosques in India
- List of Monuments of National Importance in Gujarat
