= Abu Muḥammad Chishti =

Sufi of Chishti Order

- Influences: Abu Aḥmad Abdal Chishti
- Influenced: Abu Yusuf ibn Saman

Abu Muḥammad Chishti (ابو محمد چشتی) was an early Sufi saint of the Chishti Order, a major Sufi lineage in the Islamic world. He is considered one of the spiritual forebears of the order and played a key role in laying the foundations for its teachings and practices. Although little is known about his life, he is often listed among the early transmitters of the Chishti spiritual lineage, preceding more widely known figures such as Moinuddin Chishti, who later brought the order to the Indian subcontinent.

== Career ==
Chishti was a disciple of Abu Aḥmad Abdal Chishti and master of Abu Yusuf ibn Saman. He died in 1020. Abu Muḥammad Chishti was part of golden chain of Chishti Order of Sufism.

== See also ==
- Chishti Order
