= Mumshad Al-Dinawari =

Khwaja Mumshad Uluw Al-Dīnawarī

Personal life
- Born: Dinavar
- Died: September 11, 911 Baghdad, Abbasid Caliphate (modern-day Iraq)
- Other name: Mamshad Dinawari

Religious life
- Religion: Islam
- Denomination: Sufi (Chishti)
- School: Hanafi

Muslim leader
- Based in: Baghdad
- Post: Sufi saint and mystic
- Period in office: 9th - 10th century
- Influenced by: Abu Hubayra al-Basri
- Influenced: Abu Ishaq Shami, Sheikh Ahmad Aswad Dinwari

Khwāja Mumshād ʿUlū Ad-Dīnawarī (Persian: خواجہ ممشاد علو الدینوری), also known as Karīm ad-Dīn Munʿim (Arabic: كريم الدين منعم), was a prominent Sufi of the 9th century. He was born in Dinavar, Iranian Kurdistan present day Iran province. He was disciple of Abu Hubayra al-Basri in Chishti Order and Junayd of Baghdad as well.

From Mumshad, the Chishti order transferred to Abu Ishaq Shamī and Suhrawardiyya order to Sheikh Ahmad Aswad Dinwari. He died on 14 Muharram 299 AH (11 September 911 CE) in Baghdad.

== See also ==
- Shah Jalal
