= Waheed and Naveed Chishti =

Qari Sag-e-Miran Muhammed Saeed Chishti was a Pakistani Qawwali singer. Qari Waheed, Naveed and Adeel learnt singing directly from their father, who sang in five languages: English, Arabic, Persian, Urdu and Punjabi.

SAG-E-MIRAN Qari Mohammed Saeed Chishti gained fame in his short career span due to his versatile qawwali singing. Qawwal Qari Mohammed Saeed Chishti, was the first to have sung qawwali in five languages in the 90's. The five languages included; English, Urdu, Punjabi, Pashtu and Arabic.

His short career involved releasing 11 superhit albums. The most famous, recognised Qawwali is 'Ali dam dam de andar'. This qawwali, was constantly played around the world and still is remembered by all Sufi music lovers.

He was martyred on Saturday 11th March 1995 while performing a Qawwali program in Gujarat. His mausoleum is located in Bada Graveyard, Nadwala Road, Faisalabad, right next to the main gate.

== Career ==
=== Albums ===
- RGH RELEASE -
- RGH RELEASE -
- RGH RELEASE - ISHQ TERE NE MENO KAMALEE KITHA (VOL 3, FAISALABAD)
- RGH RELEASE -
- RGH RELEASE -
- RGH RELEASE -
- RGH RELEASE -
- RGH RELEASE -
- RGH RELEASE -
- RGH RELEASE -
- RGH RELEASE - DAMA DAM MAST QALANDER (VOL 11, FAISALABAD)

=== Personal life a career ===
Sag-e-Miran Qari Muhammed Saeed Chishti was brought in up in an orthodox Muslim family and started his rhythmic career by reciting the Quran; later Qari Saeed Chishti built an interest in Natt khwani and later brought music into this. Qari Saeed Chishti (late) devoted his time and interest to his musical career and was slowly becoming very well known. He had suffered many threats but decided to continue with his career/mission of creating awareness of Islamic knowledge, human values and similarities of religious values through music. Qari Muhammed Saeed Chishtis career was brought to an end in 1995 when he was shot during a live performance in Pakistan. Saeed Chishti was most pleased to be known by the name SAG-E-MIRAN Qari Muhammed Saeed Chishti.

SAG-E-MIRAN Qari Muhammed Saeed Chishti's sons have inherited the musical pedigree and continue to work with their fathers ambition.

=== Qari Waheed Chishti ===
The eldest son of Qari Mohammed Saeed Chishti resides in Pakistan and performs qawwali around the world. An reflection of his father's style is seen in him.

=== Qari Naveed Chishti ===
A well known Naat Khwaan. However, is known to accompany many live qawwali performances alongside Qari Waheed Chishti.

=== Adeel Saeed Chishti ===
A young vibrant qawwal; who is focused on bringing fusion into his qawwali style. One of his very first releases in the UK consists of a remix qawwali by HI-TEC in Birmingham, England. Adeel Chishti's migration to the UK has proven to be positive move for his career; since, Adeel has independently performed at many festivals and mehfils around the UK. Prior, to this Adeel had started his qawwali career alongside his elder brother Qari Waheed Chishti. The brothers have performed live on several occasions in the UK.
