= Abu Aḥmad Abdal Chishti =

- Died: 966 CE
- Influences: Abu Ishaq Shami
- Influenced: Abu Muḥammad Chishti

Abu Aḥmad Abdal Chishti (Arabic: ابو احمد ابدال چشتی) was a Sufi of the Chishti Order in the 10th century CE and a disciple of Abu Ishaq Shami and the master of Abu Muḥammad Chishti. He died in 966 CE. He was Syed and his father was ruler of Fargana. He died in Chisht in Afghanistan and buried there.

== Biography ==
Abu Ahmad Abdal Chishti was born in Chisht, Afghanistan on 25 June 874 A.D, during the 6th Ramadan of the 260 AH, during the reign of the Abbasid Caliph Mu'tasim Billah. He started his journey towards Khwaja Abu Ishaq Shami from the age of 7 years. He acquired knowledge of both Uloom-i-Zahiriya and Batiniyah from Khwaja Abu Ishaq Shami. After acquiring formal knowledge, at the age of 18, he became a bayat (oath of allegiance) to Khwaja Abu Ishaq Shami. According to some accounts, he became a disciple at the age of 13.

== See also ==
- Chishti Order
