= S. R. Chishti =

Shahabur Rehman Chishti
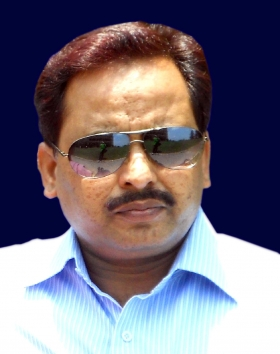

Background information
- Born: 5 June 1965 (age 60)
- Origin: Ayodhya, Uttar Pradesh, India
- Genres: Hindustani classical music, Jazz fusion, World music
- Occupation: Tabla Teacher. Musician
- Instrument: Tabla
- Years active: 1980–present

S. R. Chishti is a tabla player of Lucknow gharana (tabla) and composer. S R Chishti completed his PhD from Dr. B. R. Ambedkar University, Agra in music (Tabla).

== Career ==
He is music (tabla) instructor at Cultural Education Center, Aligarh Muslim University, Aligarh and authored Fun-e-Tabla the first ever book on the art of playing Tabla in Urdu language after 1906. He has various books on the different topics of Tabla.

== Published books ==
He has published five books so far, which include:

1. Fan-E-Tabla (Urdu) published in 2011
2. Tabla Sanchayan (Hindi) published in 2012
3. Tabla Mein Das Anko Ka Mahetv (Hindi) published in 2013
4. Bhartiye Talon Mein Theke Ke Vibhinn Sworoop (Hindi) published in 2014
5. Compositions of The Great Tabla Maestros (English)

== Awards and honors ==
- Regular 'B-High' grade artist of AIR Agra since 1995
- Honored by Swami D. R. Pavertikar Sangeet Sansthan, Mathura in 2004
- Given estimation and prestigious judgment for various musical competitions
- Tabla concert in "SPIC-MACAY", "TAJ MAHOTSAV", LUCKNOW MAHOTSAV" and Governor House Lucknow

== Views ==
Khalifa Ustad Afaq Husain Khan (Tabla Maestro, Lucknow Gharana)

Mr. Chishti is my one of my talented disciple. I am satisfied with his progress and proficiency considering his qualification and ability. I hope Mr. Chishti would give fame to Lucknow Gharana [11 June 1989].

Ustad Shafi Ahmad Khan (Vocalist), Sangeet Research Academy, ITC, Kolkata

Mr. S.R. Chishti is a talented Tabla player and a radio artist who has performed in a number of programs particularly in SPIC-MACAY and he is always with me for my Tabla sangat. He is one of the best disciples of Khalifa Ustad Afaq Husain Khan of Lucknow Gharana. I wish him all success in his future life. [12 January 1998].
