= Mohammad Badshah Qadri =

Sufi saint (1903–1978)

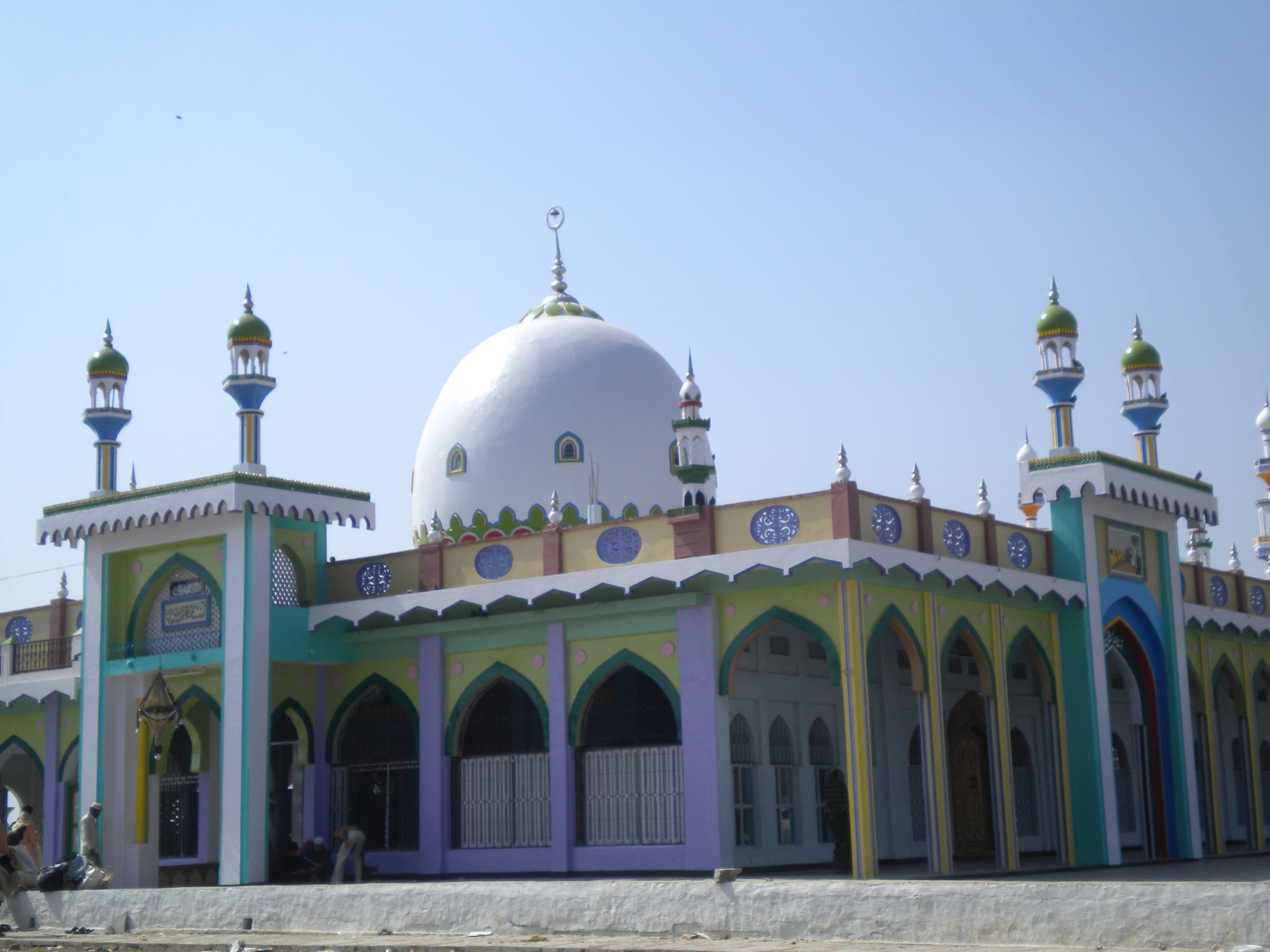
Astana-E-Quadeeri

Hazrat Khwaja Syed Mohammad Badshah Qadri-ul-Chishti Yamani Raichuri (1903 (1324 Hijri) – 1978), was a Sufi saint of the Qadiri and Chisti order in India, known commonly as Badshah Quadri or Badesha Qadri, who preached universal brotherhood and peace.

Badshah Qadri Is Also known As Quadeer Allah By His Followers.

Badshah Quadri was born in Raichur, Karnataka, India, during Bakrid on the 10th day of Dhul Hijja, on a Friday, to a Syed family which originally came from Yemen. His family trace their descent from Hasan ibn Ali, the first grandson of Muhammad.

At an early age, Badshah Quadri became a disciple of his paternal uncle Shah Nabi Mohiuddeen Quadri, of the Chisti order, who was then a renowned Chisti elder. He later became a disciple of Shaikh Karimullah Shah Qadri. Before Karimullah died, he passed the role of Pir, the leadership of the Quadeeriya and Chishti traditions, to Badshah Quadri.

Badshah Quadri is entombed in Halkatta Shareef outside of Wadi in the Gulbarga District of Karnataka. His work is continued there by his son and successor(currently his grandson Syed Abu Turab shah Quadri) . There is an annual festival or urs for Badesha Quadri and thousands of his followers travel to Halkatta Shareef for it. The urs marks the anniversary of the saint's death. The term urs literally means wedding with the divine.

== Notes ==
see
