= Mohammad Farooq Chishti =

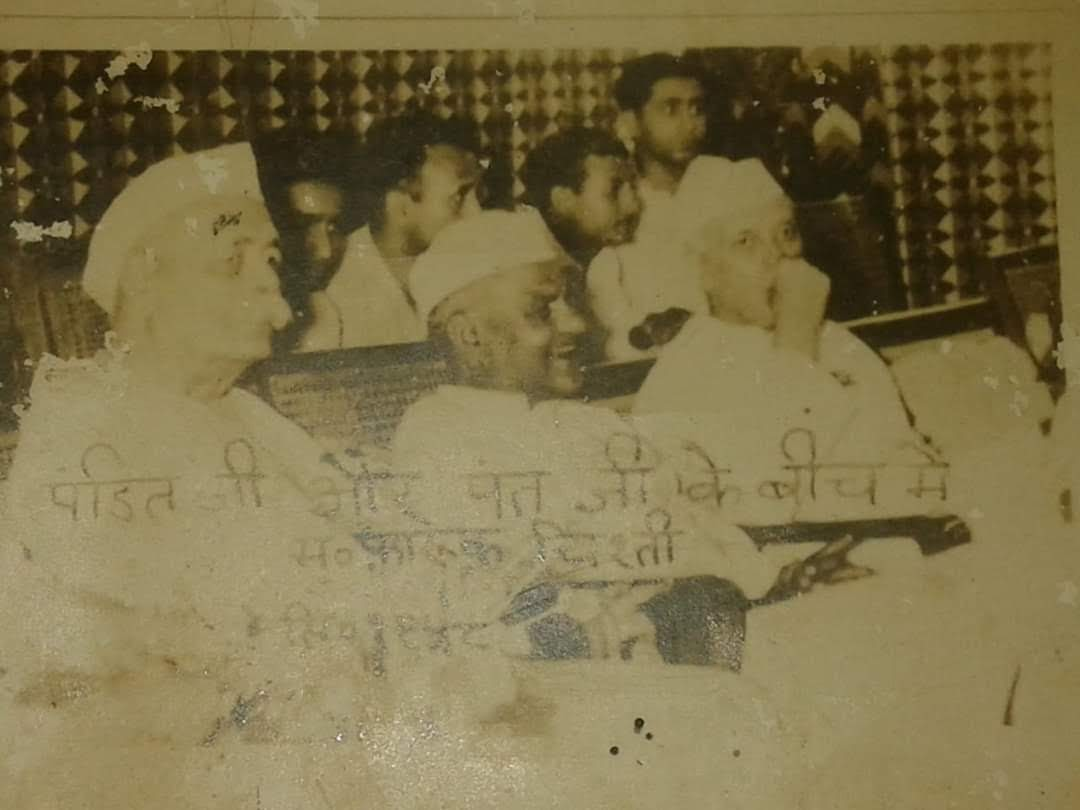
- Mohammad Farooq Chishti (M) Jawaharlal Nehru (R) and Govind Ballabh Pant (L)

Member of the Uttar Pradesh Legislative Assembly
- In office 1952–1957
- Constituency: Deoria (North East)
- In office 1957–1962
- Constituency: Deoria (North East)
- In office 1962–1967
- Constituency: Deoria (North East)
- In office 1967–1968
- Constituency: Deoria (North East)

Personal details
- Born: Deoria, India
- Died: 1968 Lucknow, India
- Party: Indian National Congress
- Relations: Mohammad Taha Chishti (grandson)
- Children: 6 sons, 3 daughters
- Education: Allahabad University
- Profession: Lawyer; Independence Activist

Mohammad Farooq Chishti was a politician from India. He was a Member of the Legislative Assembly (MLA) in the First Legislative Assembly of Uttar Pradesh. In 1952, Mohammad Farooq Chishti participated in the election on behalf of the Indian National Congress from the Deoria (North East) Legislative Assembly constituency of Deoria District of Uttar Pradesh. Farooq served as a MLA for four terms. Farooq rejected Jinna's offer. Deoria North seat MLA Mohd. Farooq Chishti.

== Early life ==
Mohammad Farooq Chishti was born as the youngest son of Barrister Maulvi Muhammad Ismail Chishti. Ismail was born in Jaunpur, Uttar Pradesh in a Zamindar family, he graduated in law from Cambridge University and served as attorney general of the state of Hyderabad. Being son of Ismail, a prominent lawyer and Indian Nationalist Farooq also graduated in law from Allahabad University. Farooq did his schooling from King Edward College Deoria, from very early age he started participating in Social movement to liberate the country. When his name came up in the Chauri Chaura incident, he was sent to Allahabad, to avoid a British reaction. Farooq started studying at Allahabad University, where he is credited for organizing the students' first successful strike, during that time he came in contact with Mahatma Gandhi.

== Political involvement ==
Farooq became so close to Gandhi and Nehru that whenever they came to the Deoria district, they would stay at the Chishti House, gradually Chishti House became safe house for all freedom fighters of Eastern Uttarpradesh. Farooq's elder brother Hamid Chishti also joined the fight for independence along with Maulana Mazharul Haq an important character of Independence movement, they blew the trumpet against the British rule during the First World War.

Farooq rejected the proposal of Muhammad Ali Jinnah brought by the King of Salempur for the Home Minister of Pakistan saying "I want my country to achieve Freedom from Britishers and at this time my only mission is to see free United India".

After the Independence, he was elected as a MLA in 1952, 1957, 1962 and 1967 on Indian National Congress ticket from Uttar Pradesh's Deoria (North East) Legislative Assembly constituency. He passed away early in 1968.
