= Khwaja Sadid ad-Din Huzaifa al-Marashi =

Sadid ad-Din
- Born: Marash
- Died: Basra Iraq
- Influences: Ibrāhīm bin Adham
- Influenced: Abu Hubayra al-Basri

Khwaja Sadid ad-Din Huzaifa al-Marashi (Urdu: خواجہ حذیفہ المرعشی) was a famous Sufi of the Chishti Order born in Marash in present-day Turkey during the 8th century. He was a disciple of Ibrāhīm bin Adham. He died on 14th Shawal 207 Hijri, which is 823 AD. It is said that imam Al-Shafi'i was also among his Khulafa.
