= Abu Hubayra al-Basri =

Sufi of the Chishti Order

- Died: 895; Basra, Iraq
- Influences: Khwaja Sadid ad-Din Huzaifa al-Marashi
- Influenced: Khwaja Mumshad Uluw Al Dīnawarī

Abu Hubayra Amin ad deen al-Basri (Urdu ابو ہبیرہ امین الدین البصری ) was great Sufi of Chishti Order from Basra, Iraq. He was the disciple of Khwaja Sadid ad-Din Huzaifa al-Marashi and teacher of Khwaja Mumshad Uluw Al Dīnawarī Abu Hubayra al-Basri is important link of chain of Chishti Order. At the age of seven he memorized Quran by heart and became mureed of Khwaja Sadid ad-Din Huzaifa al-Marashi at the age of thirty.
