= Chishti Order =

Sufi mystic order in Sunni Islam

Chishti order
- الطريقة التشيتشي al-Ṭarīqa al-Chīshtīyya
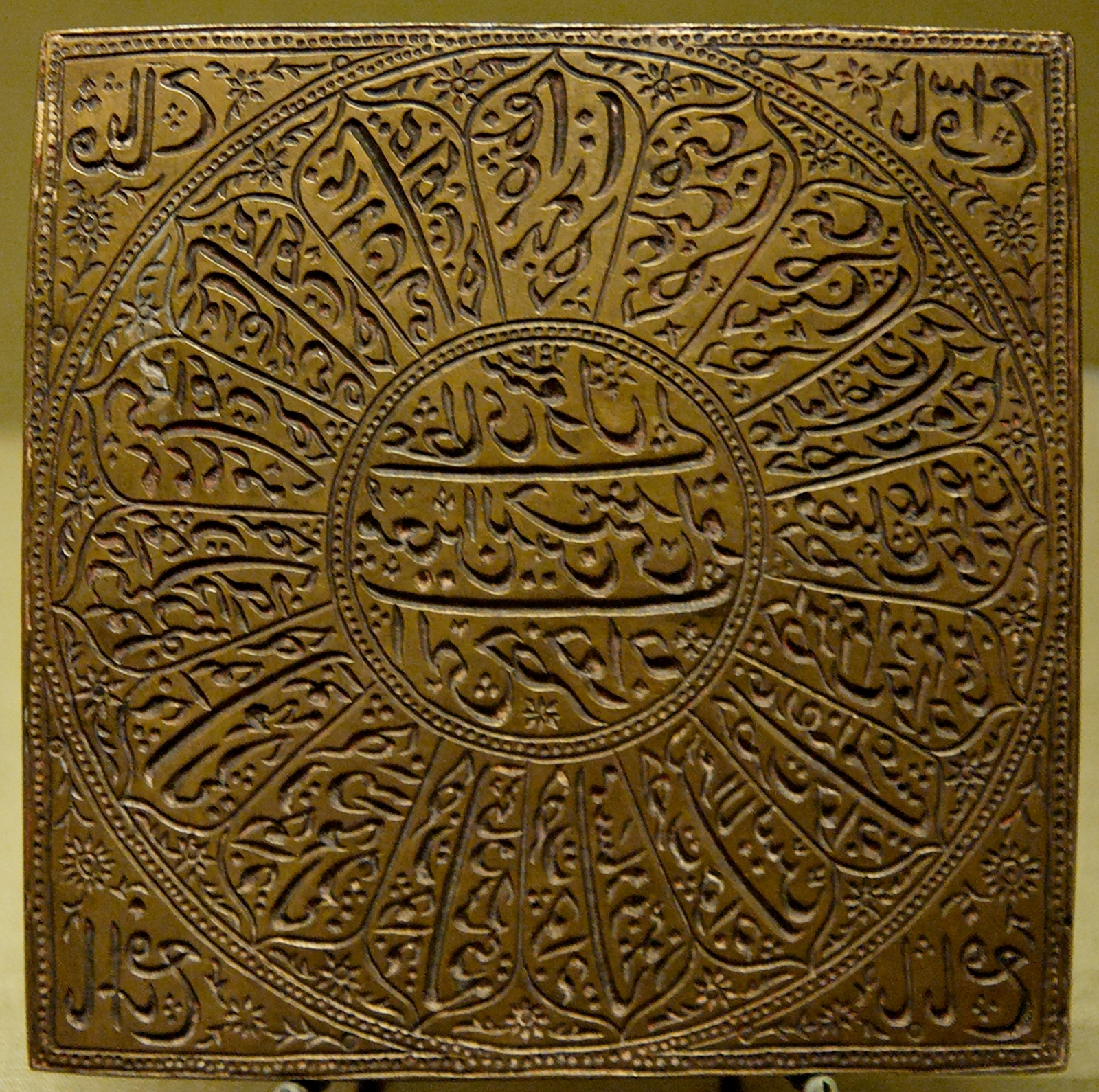
- Seal emblem of the Chishti order
- Abbreviation: Chīshtīyya
- Type: Sufi order
- Classification: Sunni Islam
- Key people: Mu'in al-Din Chishti
- Region: South Asia
- Founder: Abu Ishaq Shami
- Origin: c. 930 CE

The Chishti order (Persian: چشتیه, romanized: Čištiya) is a Sufi order of Sunni Islam named after the town of Chisht, Afghanistan, where it was initiated by Abu Ishaq Shami. The order was brought to Herat and later spread across South Asia by Mu'in al-Din Chishti in the city of Ajmer.

The Chishti order is known for its emphasis on love, tolerance, and openness. The Chishti order is primarily followed in Afghanistan and the Indian subcontinent. The Chishti order was the first of the four main Sufi orders that became well-established in South Asia, which are the Qadiri, Chishti, Naqshbandi and Suhrawardi Sufi orders. Khwaja Muinuddin Chishti introduced the Chishti Order in Ajmer (Rajasthan, India) sometime in the middle of the 12th century. He was eighth in the line of succession from the founder of the Chishti Order, Abu Ishaq Shami. There are now several branches of the order, which has been the most prominent South Asian Sufi brotherhood since the 12th century.

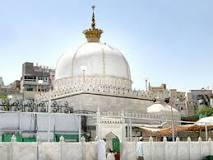
Tomb of Khwaja Moinuddin Chishti, renowned saint of Chishti order

In the 20th century, the order has spread outside Afghanistan and the Indian subcontinent. Chishti teachers have established centers in the United Kingdom, United States, Canada, Australia, Eastern and Southern Africa.

== Guiding principles ==
The Chishti shaykhs have stressed the importance of keeping a distance from worldly power. A ruler could be a patron or a disciple, but he or she was always to be treated as just another devotee. A Chishti teacher should not attend the court or be involved in matters of state, as this will corrupt the soul with worldly matters. In his last discourse to his followers, Khawaja Moinuddin Chishti said:

Never seek any help, charity, or favors from anybody except God. Never go to the courts of kings, but never refuse to bless and help the needy & the poor, the widow, and the orphan, if they come to your door.

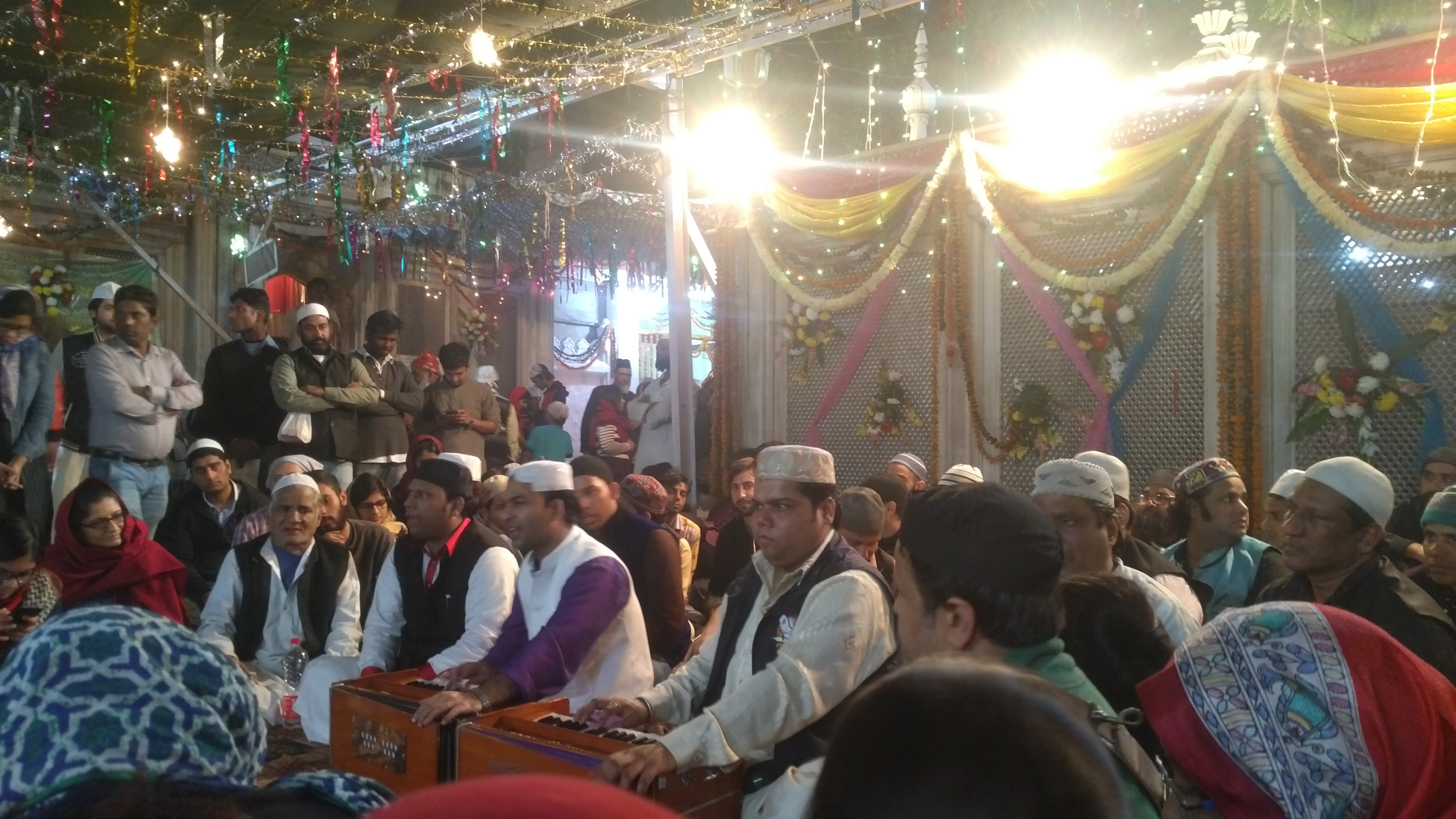
Qawwali at Nizamuddin Auliya's shrine

Chishti practice is also notable for Sama: evoking the divine presence by listening to and losing oneself in a form of music and poetry, usually Qawwali. The Chishti, and some other Sufi orders, believe that Sama can help devotees forget self in the love of Allah. However, the order also insists that followers observe the full range of Muslim obligations; it does not dismiss them as mere legalism, as some strands of Sufism have done.

However some Qadiris point out that the Chishti Order and Moinuddin Chishti never permitted musical instruments, and cite a Chishti, Muhammad Ibn Mubarak Kirmani, the Mureed of Khwaja Fareed al-Deen Ganj-e-Shakar, who wrote in his Siyar al-Awliya that Nizamuddin Auliya said the following:

"Sama is permissible if a few conditions are met. The singer must be an adult and not a child or a female. The listener must only listen to everything in the remembrance of Allah. The words that are sung must be free from obscenity and indecency and they must not be void. Musical instruments must not be present in the gathering. If all these conditions are met, Sima' is permissible".

"...Someone complained to the Sultan of the Mashaa’ikh that some of the dervishes danced in a gathering where there were musical instruments. He said, they did not do good as something impermissible cannot be condoned".

— Siyar al-Awliya

However, this has been countered by the more historical excerpt of Nizamuddin Auliya's quotation:

The hearing, the person that is being heard should be a mature man and not a young boy or a woman. The audible, the sound that is heard, the lyrics should not be indecent or shameful. The hearer should only hear to gain Divine nearness only and nothing else. The instruments can be any. The hearing is a voice, how can this be Haraam, how can the sounds of lyrics be Haraam? And finally there is the heart being touched and moved by this. How can this be Haraam if it brings the listener closer to Allah?

— Nizamuddin Awliya, Fawa'id al Fu'wad, Pg 444

== Practices ==
The Chishtis follow five basic devotional practices (dhikr).

1. Reciting the names of Allāh loudly, sitting in the prescribed posture at prescribed times (dhikr-i jali)
2. Reciting the names of Allāh silently (dhikr-i khafī)
3. Regulating the breath (pās-i anfās)
4. Absorption in meditation on the Divine (murā-ḳāba)
5. Forty days or more days of spiritual confinement in a lonely corner or cell for prayer and contemplation (čilla)

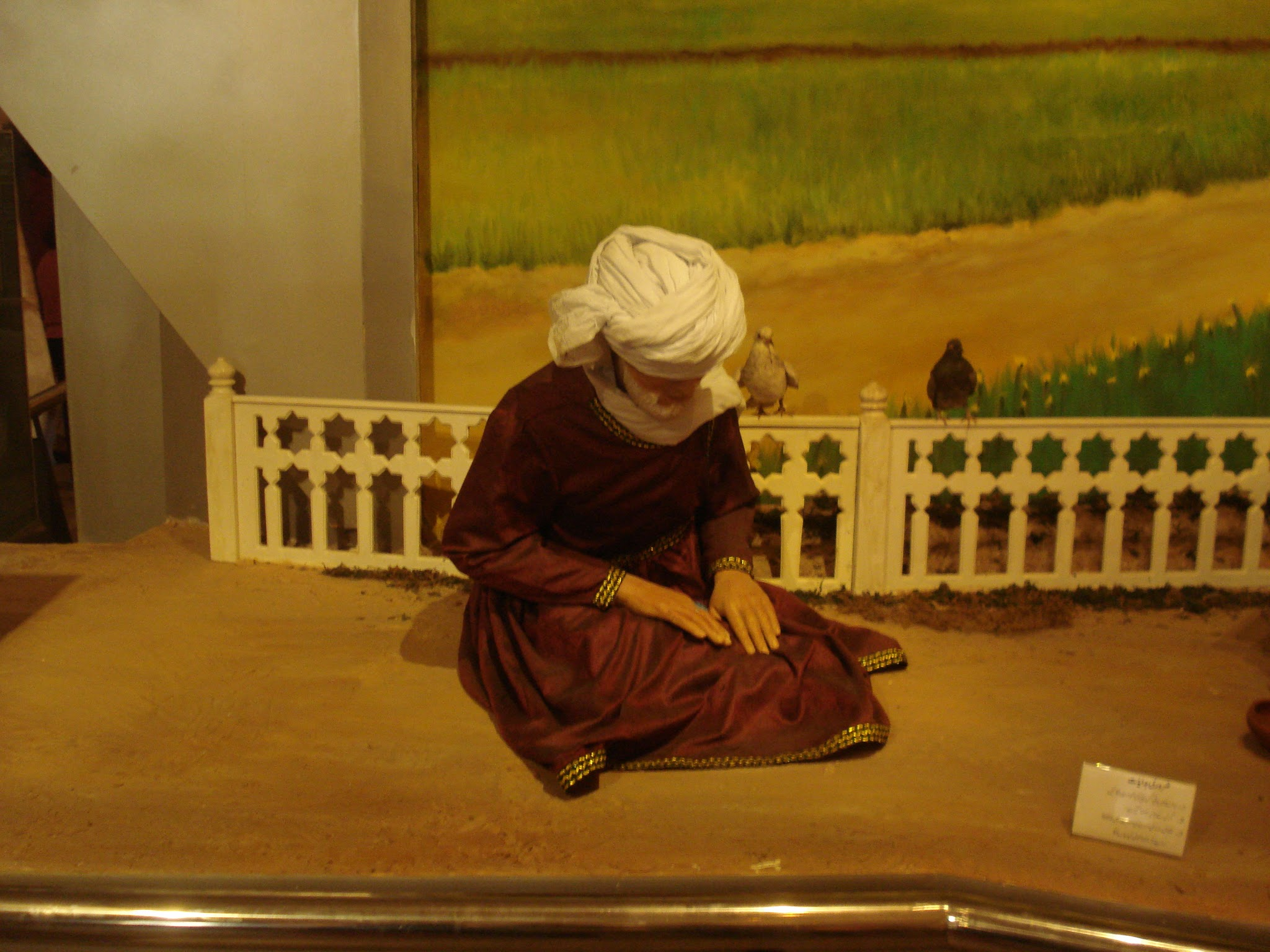
Old man busy in zikr

== Literature ==
Early Chishti shaykhs adopted concepts and doctrines outlined in two influential Sufi texts: the ʿAwārif al-Maʿārif of Shaykh Shihāb al-Dīn Suhrawardī and the Kashf al-Maḥjūb of Ali Hujwīrī. These texts are still read and respected today. Chishtis also read collections of the sayings, speeches, poems, and letters of the shaykhs. These collections, called malfūẓāt, were prepared by the shaykh's disciples.

== Spiritual lineage ==
Sufi orders trace their origins ultimately to the Islamic prophet Muhammad, who is believed to have instructed his successor in mystical teachings and practices in addition to the Qur'an or hidden within the Qur'an. Opinions differ as to this successor. Almost all Sufi orders trace their origins to 'Alī ibn Abī Ṭālib, Muhammad's cousin.

The traditional silsila (spiritual lineage) of the Chishti order is as follows:

1. Muḥammad
2. Ali ibn Abu Talib
3. Al-Ḥasan al-Baṣrī (d. 728, an early Persian Muslim theologian)
4. 'Abdul Wāḥid ibn Zaid Abul Faḍl (d. 793, an early Sufi saint)
5. Fuḍayl ibn 'Iyāḍ ibn Mas'ūd ibn Bishr al-Tamīmī
6. Ibrāhīm ibn Adham (a legendary early Sufi ascetic)
7. Khwaja Sadid ad-Din Huzaifa al-Marashi, Basra, Iraq
8. Abu Hubayra al-Basri, Basra, Iraq
9. Khwaja Uluw Mumshad Al Dīnawarī
10. Abu Ishaq Shamī (d. 940, founder of the Chishti order proper)
11. Aḥmad Abdal Chishti
12. Abu Muḥammad Muhtram Chishti
13. Abu Yusuf Nasar-ud-Din Chishtī
14. Qutab-ud-Din Maudood Chishtī
15. Haji Sharif Zindani (d. 1215)
16. Usman Harooni (d. 1220)
17. Mu'īnuddīn Chishtī (Moinuddin Chishti) (1141–1230 or 1142–1236)
18. Qutab-ud-Din Bakhtyar Kaki (1173–1228)
19. Farīduddīn Mas'ūd ("Baba Farid", 1173 or 1175–1266)

After Farīduddīn Mas'ūd, the Chishti order divided into two branches:

- Chishtī Sabri, who follow Alauddin Sabir Kaliyari (Sabiri/Sabriya branch)
- Chishtī Nizami who follow Nizāmuddīn Auliyā (Nizami/Nizamiya branch)

== History ==
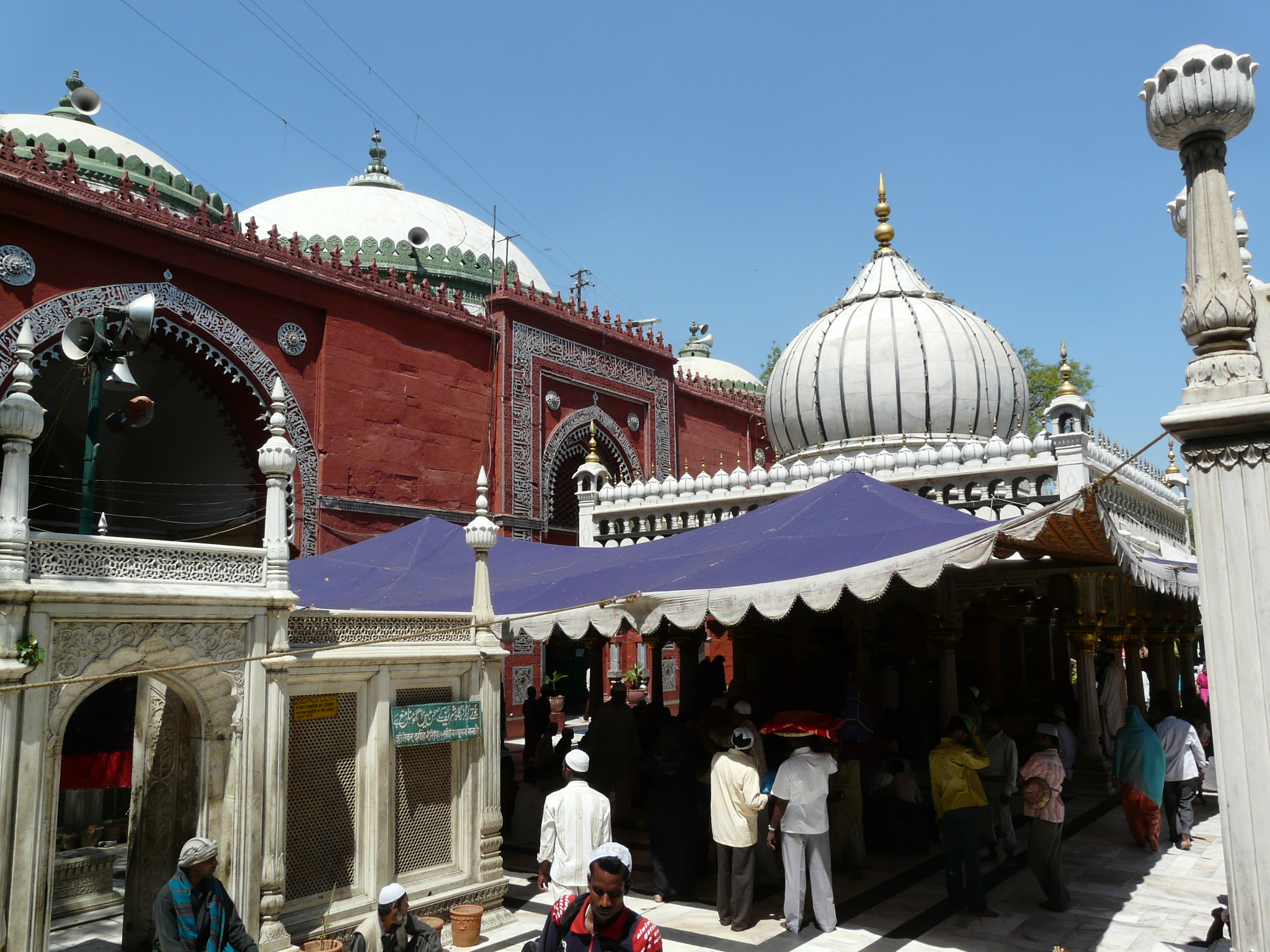
Mughal princess Jahan Ara's tomb (left), Nizamuddin Auliya's tomb (right) and Jama'at Khana Masjid (background), at Nizamuddin Dargah complex, in Nizamuddin West, Delhi

The Encyclopedia of Islam divides Chishti history into four periods:

- Era of the great shaykhs (c. 597/1200 to 757/1356)
- Era of the provincial khānaḳāhs (8th/14th & 9th/15th centuries)
- Rise of the Ṣābiriyya branch (9th/15th century onwards)
- Revival of the Niẓāmiyya branch (12th/18th century onwards)

The order was founded by Abu Ishaq Shami ("the Syrian"), who taught Sufism in the town of Chisht, some 95 miles east of Herat in present-day western Afghanistan. Before returning to Syria, where he is now buried next to Ibn Arabi at Jabal Qasioun, Shami initiated, trained and deputized the son of the local emir, Abu Ahmad Abdal. Under the leadership of Abu Ahmad's descendants, the Chishtiya, as they are also known, flourished as a regional mystical order.

The founder of the Chishti Order in South Asia was Moinuddin Chishti. He was born in the province of Silistan in eastern Persia around 536 AH (1141 CE) into a sayyid family claiming descent from Muhammad. When he was just nine, he memorized the Qur'an, thus becoming a hafiz. His father died when he was a teenager; Moinuddin inherited the family grinding mill and orchard. He sold everything and gave the proceeds to the poor. He traveled to Balkh and Samarkand, where he studied the Qur'an, hadith, and fiqh. He looked for something beyond scholarship and law and studied under the Chishti shaykh Usman Harooni (Harvani). He moved to Lahore and then to Ajmer, where he died. His tomb, in Ajmer, is the Dargah Sharif, a popular shrine and pilgrimage site.

Moinuddin was followed by Qutab-ud-Din Bakhtyar Kaki and Farīduddīn Mas'ūd 'Baba Farid'. After Fariduddin, the Chishti Order of South Asia split into two branches. Each branch was named after one of Fariduddin's successors.

1. Nizamuddin Auliya – the Chishti Nizami branch
2. Alauddin Sabir Kaliyari – the Chishti-Sabiri branch

It was after Nizamuddin Auliya that the Chishti Sufism chain spread throughout the Indian Peninsula. Two prominent lines of transmission arose from Nizamuddin Auliya, one from his disciple Nasiruddin Chiragh Dehlavi and the other from another disciple, Akhi Siraj Aainae Hind, who migrated to West Bengal from Delhi on Nizamuddin Auliya's order. Siraj Aanae Hind was followed by his notable disciple Alaul Haq Pandavi settled in Pandava, West Bengal itself. From this chain of transmission another prominent sub-branch of Chishti way emerged known as Ashrafia Silsila after the illustrious saint Ashraf Jahangir Semnani, who was the disciple of Alaul Haq Pandavi in the thirteen century A.D. Later, yet other traditions branched from the Chishti lineage; in many cases they merged with other popular Sufi orders in South Asia.

As a result of this merging of the Chishti order with other branches, most Sufi masters now initiate their disciples in all the four major orders of South Asia: the Qadiri, Chishti, Naqshbandi, and Suhrawadi Sufi orders. They do however teach devotional practices typical of the order with which they are primarily associated.

In 1937 the Sufi Imam Al-Hajj Wali Akram founded the First Cleveland Mosque, made his Sufi affiliation public and during the 1950s started to introduce new members to the Chishti, making the mosque the first public Sufi center of the United States. In more recent times, a more contemporary expression of traditional Chishti Sufi practices can be found in the establishment of the Ishq-Nuri Tariqa in the 1960s, as a branch of the Chishti-Nizami silsila.

In addition, a number of mixed-Sufi type groups or movements in Islam, have also been influenced by the Chishti Order proper. The best known and most widespread example is of the Jamaat Ahle Sunnat, a Sunni Muslim sect with a huge international following, which is in essence not a proper Sufi organization, though adopting many Sufi customs and traditions.

== Indo-Islamic rulers ==
From the 14th century onwards (during the rule of the Tughluqs), the Chishti Order came to be associated with political prosperity for the Indian subcontinent's Muslim kingdoms. The Delhi Sultanate, Bahmani Sultanate, Bengal Sultanate, and various provincial dynasties associated themselves with Shaikhs of the Chishti Order for good fortune. Shrines of prominent Shaikhs were patronised by ruling dynasties, who made pilgrimages to these sites. Often the founding member of a kingdom paid respects to a Chishti Shaikh as a way of legitimising their new state, and this Shaikh became closely associated with the whole dynasty. For example, fourteen successive Bengal Sultans considered Shaikh 'Ala Al-Haq to be their spiritual master.

Several rulers of the Mughal dynasty of South Asia were Chishti devotees, and they associated with the Order in a similar fashion to the Mughals' predecessors. The emperor Akbar was perhaps the most fervent of them. It is said to be by the blessing of Shaikh Salim Chishti that Akbar's first surviving child, the future Jahangir, was born. The child was named Salim after the sheikh and was affectionately addressed by Akbar as Sheikhu Baba.

Akbar also credited the Chishti Shaikhs with his victory at the Siege of Chittorgarh. Akbar had vowed to visit the Chishti dargah, the tomb of Moinuddin Chishti, at Ajmer if he were victorious. He fulfilled his vow by visiting the dargah with his musicians, who played in honor of the sheikh.

Shah Jahan's daughter, Jahanara Begum Sahib, was also a devout follower of the Chishti Order. Shah Jahan's son Aurangzeb patronised various Chishti shrines.

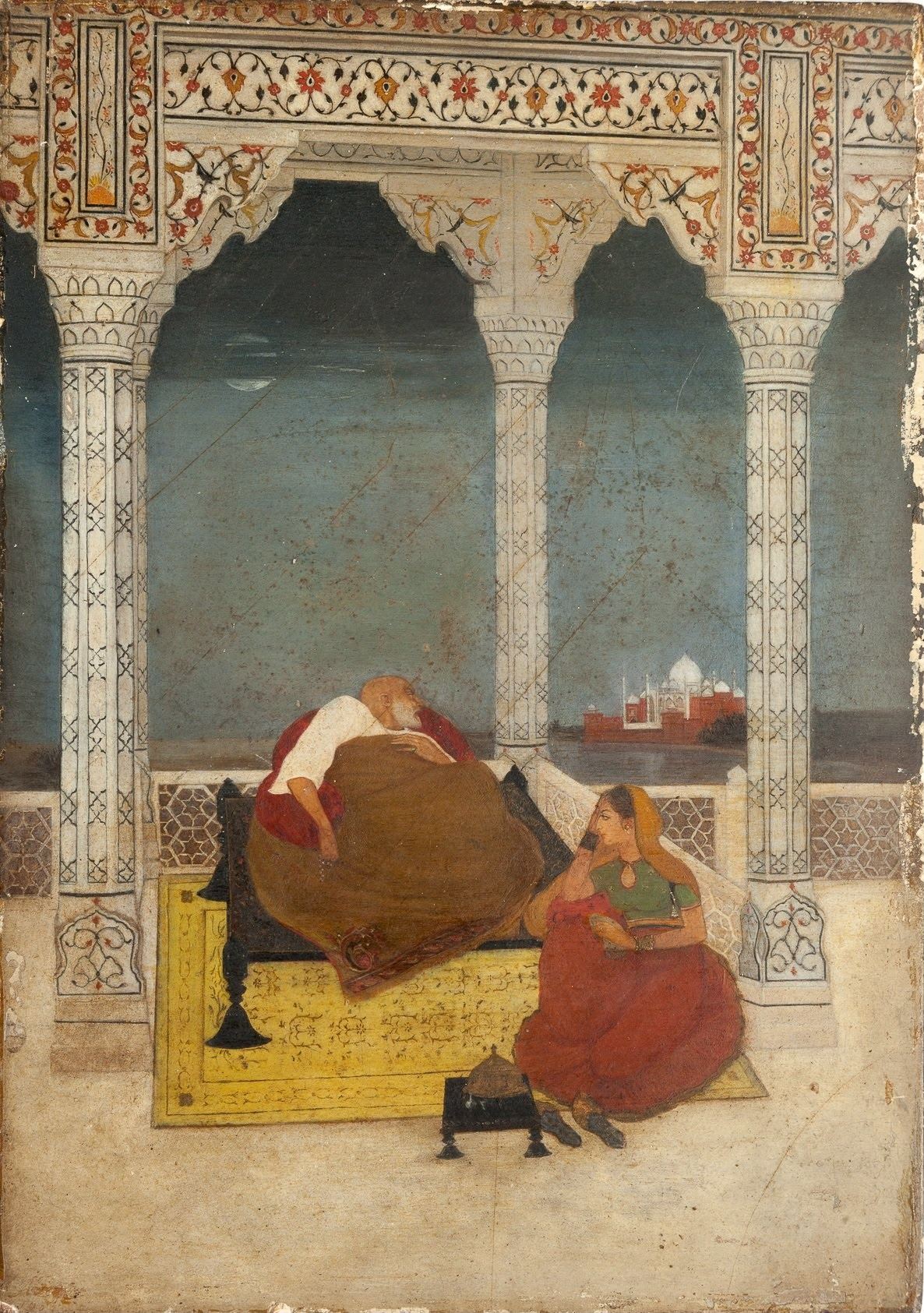
The passing of Shah Jahan; attending him, his daughter Princess Jahanara.

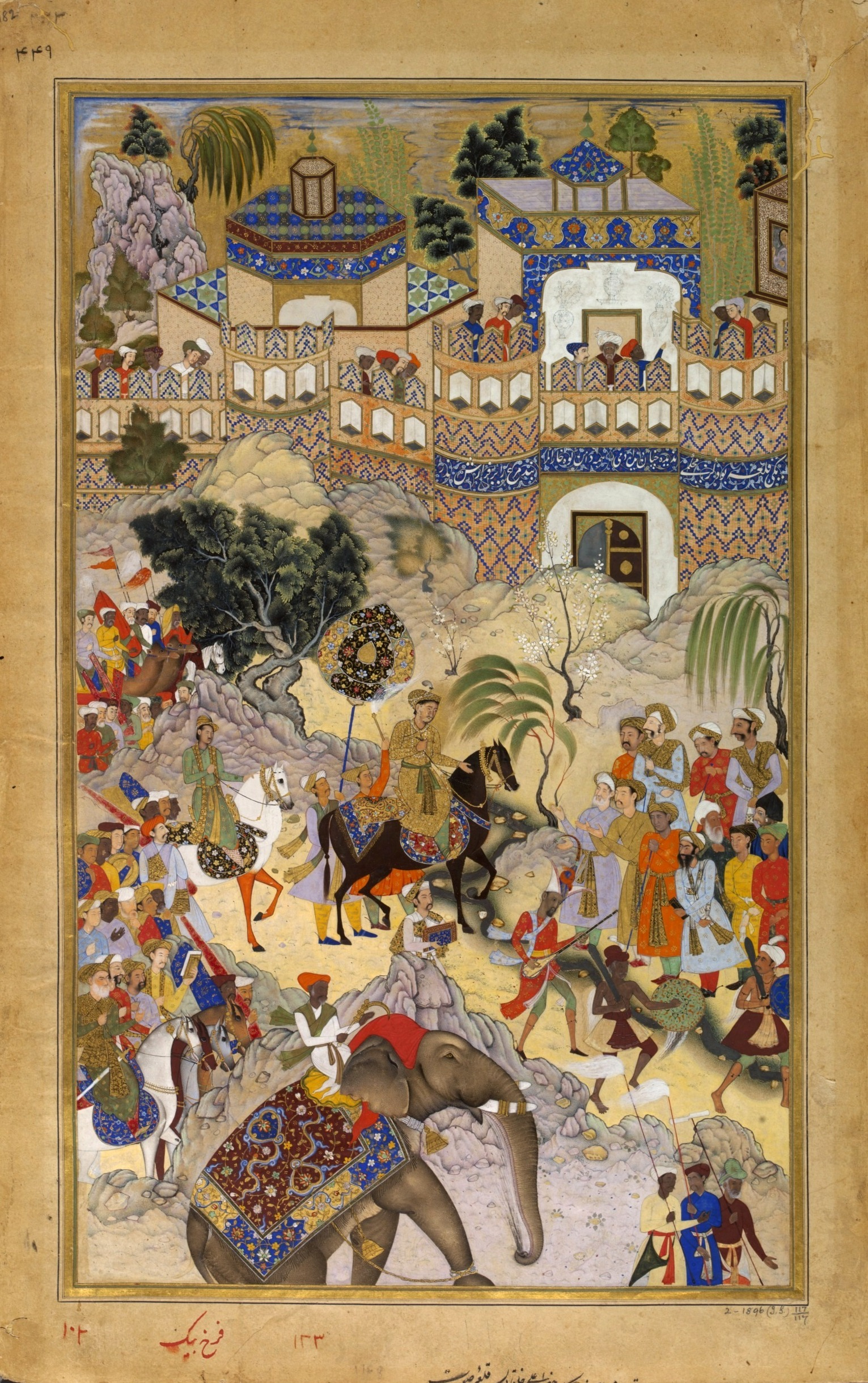
The Mughal Emperor Akbar was a great patron of the Chishti Order.

== Other notable Chishti shaykhs ==
- Qutb ud deen Modood Chishti 527 A.H
- Haji Shareef zandani 612 A.H
- Usman Harooni 617 A.H
- Moinuddin Chishti
- Qut ul aqtab Qutb ud deen Bakhtiyar kaki 635 A.H (Delhi, India)
- Fareed ud deen Mas’ood Ganj E Shakar 668 A.H (Pak Patan Sharif, Pakistan)
- Naseer ud deen Mahmood Charagh Dehlavi 757 A.H (Delhi, India)
- Tajuddin Chishti (Chishtian Sharif, Pakistan)
- Amir Khusro (Delhi, India)
- Akhi Siraj Aainae Hind (Dist. Malda, West Bengal, India)
- Alaul Haq Pandavi (Dist. Malda, West Bengal, India)
- Nur Qutb Alam (Dist. Malda, West Bengal, India)
- Ashraf Jahangir Semnani (Kichaucha, Uttar Pradesh, India)
- Burhanuddin Gharib (Maharashtra, India)
- Bande Nawaz (Gulbarga, India)
- Salim Chishti (Fatehpur Sikri, India)
- Noor Muhammad Maharvi1205 A.H (Mahar Sharif, Pakistan)
- Muhammad Suleman Taunsvi 1267 A.H (Taunsa Sharif, Pakistan)
- Ata Hussain Fani Chishti (Bihar, India)
- Khwaja Ghulam Farid (Mithankot, Pakistan)
- Muhammad Shamsuddin Sialvi 1300 A.H (Sial Sharif, Pakistan)
- Ahamed Mohiyudheen Noorishah Jeelani (Noori Maskan, Hyderabad)
- Sayyid Mir Jan (supreme leader of the Naqshbandiyya, who also followed the Chishtiyya tradition)
- Meher Ali Shah (Golra Sharif, Pakistan)
- Inayat Khan (Vadodara, Gujarat)
- Haji Imdadullah Muhajir Makki (Muzaffarnagar, India/Makkah, Saudi Arabia)

== See also ==
- Waris Shah
- Mirza Halim Shah Dargah
- Sabri Brothers
- Nusrat Fateh Ali Khan
- Hakim Ahmad Shuja
- Sufi Ruhaniat International
- Syed Waheed Ashraf
