= Madanpur Khadar Village =

- Neighbourhood
- Location in Delhi, India
- Coordinates: 28.53447°N 77.29929°E
- Country: India
- State: Delhi
- District: South East Delhi

Population
  - Total: 1 lac Approx.

Languages
  - Official: Hindi, English
- Time zone: UTC+5:30 (IST)
- PIN: 110076
- Lok Sabha constituency: East Delhi Lok Sabha
- Vidhan Sabha: Okhla Assembly
- Municipal Corporation Ward: Madanpur Khadar West - Ward No. 186

Madanpur Khadar is an urban village in South East district of Delhi. It is located on Delhi-UP Border and is named after Thakur Madan Singh Chauhan. The term Khadar is attached to the village's name because it is situated on the banks of Yamuna river. "Khadar" means fertile, and true to its name, the village is indeed a very fertile region. It was declared as an urban village by the administrative authorities under Delhi Metropolitan Council in 1966.

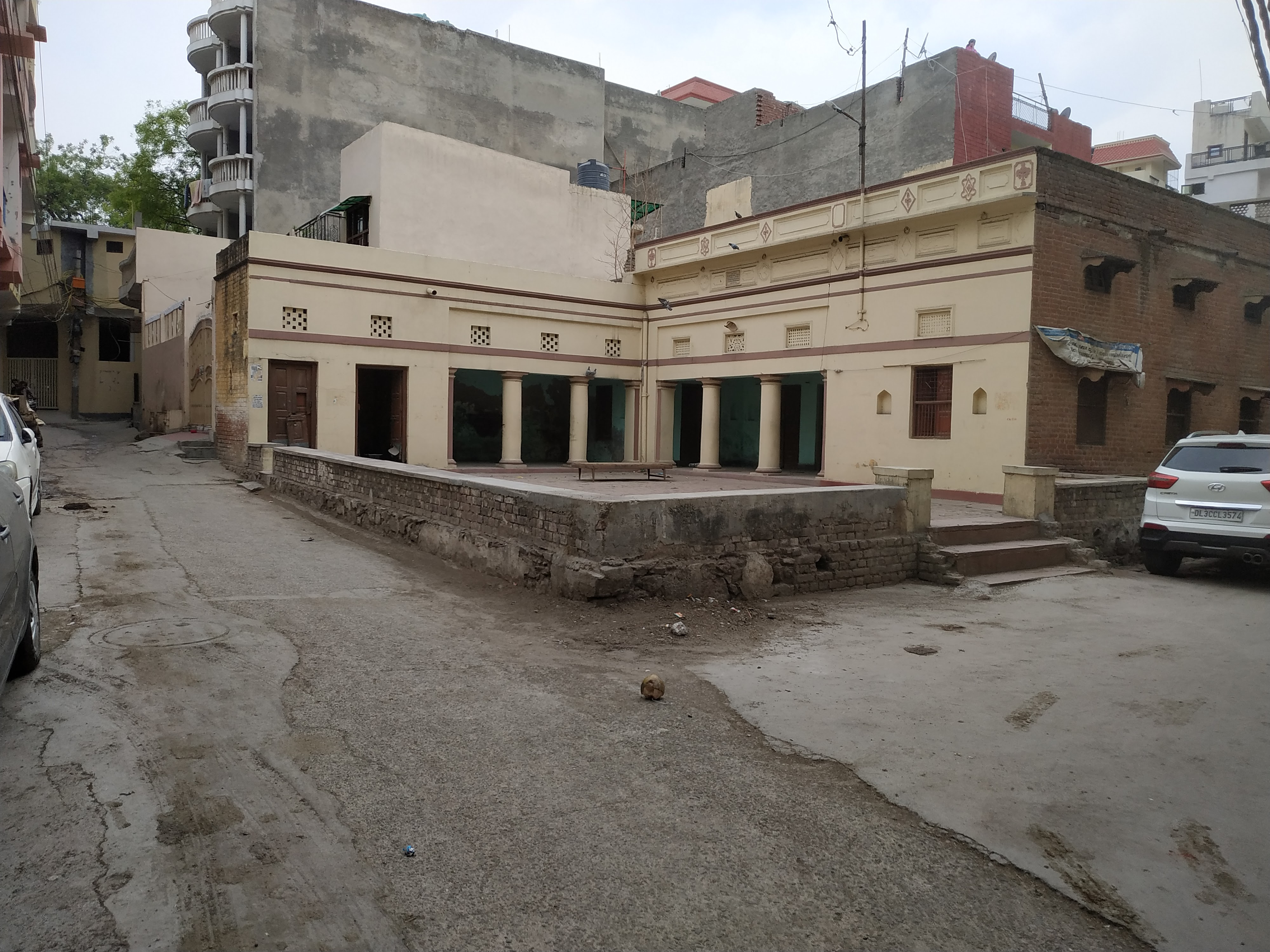
A Chaupal in Madanpur Khadar village

== History ==
Madanpur Khadar is an 1100 years old village. The village hosts a 300 year old Haveli, in its very centre surrounded by rest of the houses. The Zaildar(tax collector) of Madanpur Khadar resided here, and were well known for their anti-colonial attitude.

Tirkha Ram Zaildar, an important figure in the village's history, established a Chaupal in the village. This chaupal went on to become a regular meeting point for the village's decision makers, and played a crucial in role in the centralization of the village. The Chaupal also sheltered the staff of Jamia Millat Islamia, during the 1947 partition.

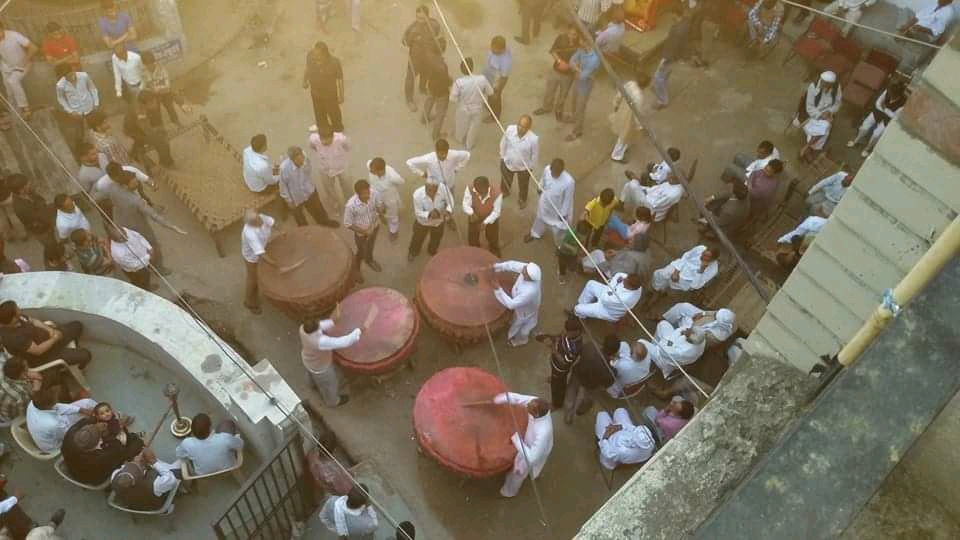
People of Madanpur Khadar Village Celebrating Holi

== Demographics ==
- According to the 2011 Census of India, the total population was 111,442. The village is splint into 2 municipal wards. Madanpur Khadar East (Ward 185) accounted for 54,724 people and Madanpur Khadar West (Ward 186) accounted for 56,718 people.
- It is one of modern villages in delhi, with facilities like hospitals, private schools, delhi government schools. But still being congested with narrow roads, small unplanned 4+ storeyed buildings and houses.

== Administration ==
Madanpur Khadar village comes under the jurisdiction of South East Delhi. The Sub Division is Sarita Vihar while its office is situated in Amar Colony and the DCP office is in Sarita Vihar. Police Station Sarita Vihar have jurisdiction over Madanpur Khadar Village.

== Governance ==
- Madanpur Khadar Village comes under Madanpur Khadar West - ward 186, The Councillor is Braham Singh Bidhuri.
- In Delhi Legislative assembly, Madanpur Khadar Village comes under Okhla Assembly of Delhi Vidhansabha. MLA is Amanatullah Khan.
- In Loksabha, Madanpur Khadar village comes under East Delhi Loksabha. Hatsh Malhotra is the Member of Parliament from this area

== Educational institutions ==
- D.A.V Public School, Jasola
- GD Goenka School, Sarita Vihar
- Government Boys Senior Secondary school, Madanpur Khadar
- Government Girls Senior Secondary School, Madanpur Khadar
- Rama Krishna Government Sarvodaya Bal Vidyalaya, Madanpur Khadar
- Saint Giri Public School, Sarita Vihar
- Sarvodaya Kanya Vidyalya, Madanpur Khadar
- SDMC Boys Primary School, Madanpur Khadar
- SDMC Girls Primary School, Madanpur Khadar

== Hospitals ==
- All India Institute of Ayurveda, Delhi The AIIAD project completed in 2016, AIIA was Inaugurated by Prime Minister Narendra Modi.
- Apollo Hospital, Indraprastha .
- Fortis Escorts Heart Institute.
- Holy Family Hospital are some of the hospitals located within the radius of 5 km of the village.
- MCW Madanpur Khadar - Mother and Child Welfare Centre, Madanpur Khadar
- MCD Allopathic Dispensary, Madanpur Khadar
- Veterinary Hospital, Madanpur Khadar

Construction of a 350 Bed Government Hospital has started in K&L Block of Sarita Vihar

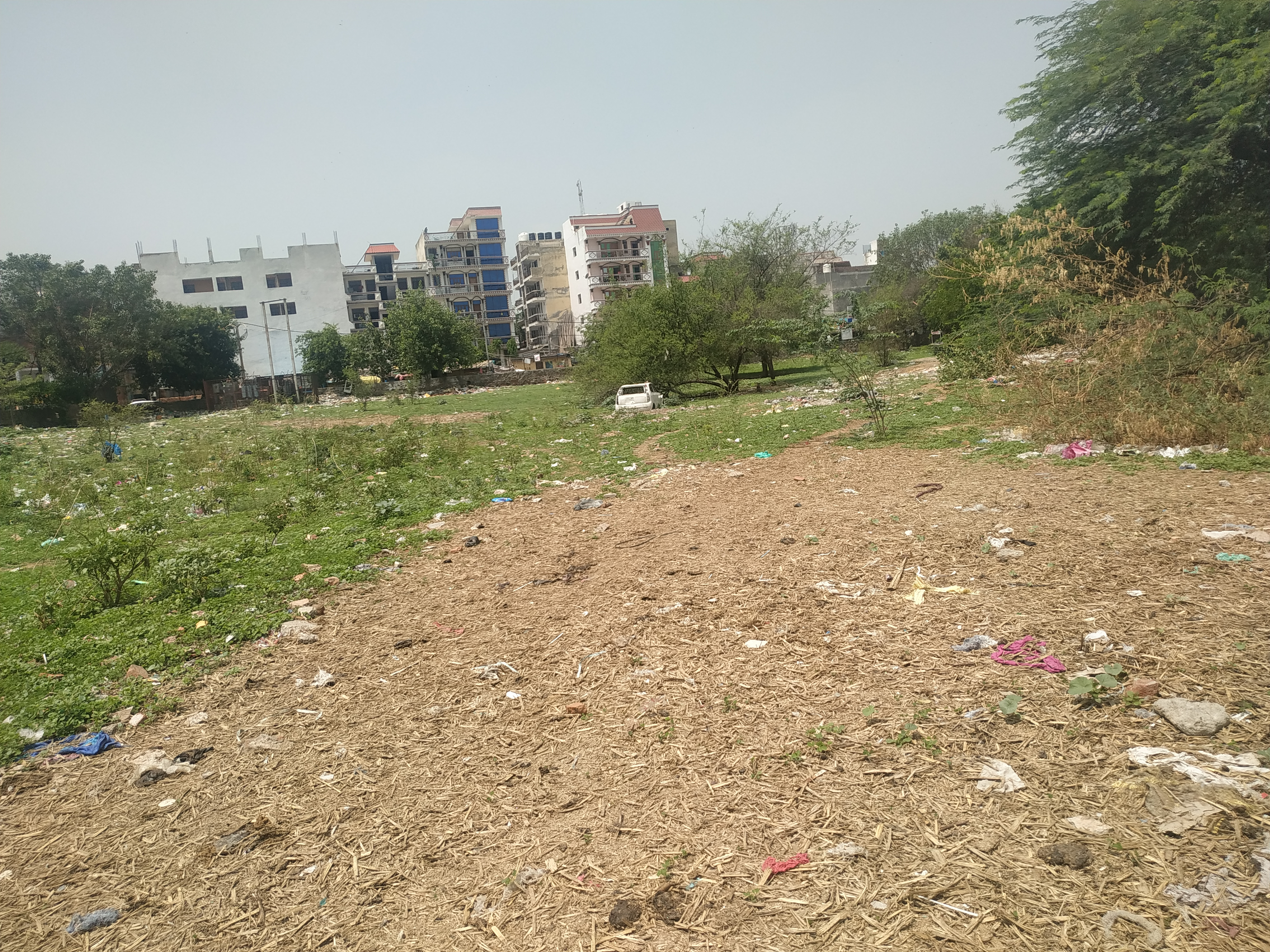
Land For Government Hospital in Sarita Vihar

== Future Projects ==
DND–KMP Expressway - In March 2019 Union minister for road transport and highways Nitin Gadkari laid the foundation stone for a 59-km six-lane DND–KMP Expressway national highway connecting New Delhi's Ring Road with the under-construction Delhi-Mumbai Expressway. The highway alignment was announced by the Centre in May, 2018. The access-controlled highway project will start at the Ring Road-DND junction passing through the Kalindi Kunj, Madanpur Khadar Village, Aali Village, Meethapur Chowk and Faridabad-Ballabhgarh bypass, and will finish at the interchange of the Delhi-Mumbai Expressway at the Western Peripheral Expressway or Kundli-Manesar–Palwal (KMP) Expressway this Project is going to further enhance the appeal of Madanpur Khadar Village

== Religious places ==
- Ganga Mandi
- Shri Laxmi Narayan Mandir, M&N block, Sarita vihar
- Kheda Devta Mandir - This is Gram Devta, the villagers worship it on auspicious and festive days.
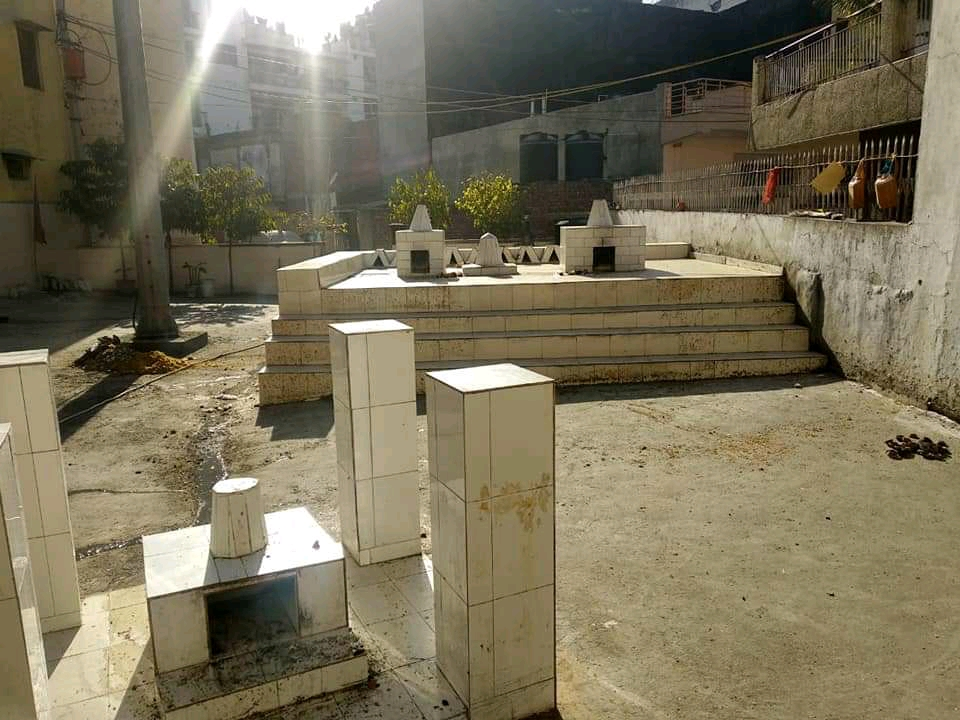
  Kheda Devta Mandir in Madanpur Khadar Village
- Radha Krishna Mandir
- Shiv Mandir, Madanpur Khadar - This is the oldest temple not only in the village but also around the whole area.

== Public transportation ==
Madanpur Khadar Village is situated at a Prime location of South East Delhi having as in East Direction DND-KMP Expressway, in West Direction Delhi-Mathura Highway, In North Noida Kalindi Kunj Road. It is at Border of Uttar Pradesh and Haryana. People Can travel to Noida and Faridabad In just 10 Minutes.

Entry Point of Madanpur Khadar Village from Delhi-Mathura Highway

Nearest Metro Station :

- Sarita Vihar (Delhi Metro) Station on Violet Line
- Jasola - Shaheen Bagh (Delhi Metro) Station on Magenta Line.
- Kalindi Kunj (Delhi Metro) Station on Magenta Line.

Delhi Transport Corporation (DTC) buses which pass from Madanpur Khadar Village are:

- 460 (Badarpur Border - Minto Road)
- 405 (Badarpur Border - Old Delhi Railway Station)
- 479 (Badarpur Border - Punjabi Bagh)
- 34 (Mehrauli - Noida Sector 37)
- 8 (Badarpur Border - Noida Phase II)
- 404 (Madanpur Khadar Village - Mori Gate)
- 465 (Madanpur Khadar Extension - Safdarjung Terminal)
- 473 (Badarpur Border - Anand vihar Terminal)
- 422 (Badarpur Border - Kashmiri Gate)

== Notable people ==
- Boxer Gaurav Bidhuri hails from Madanpur Khadar Village

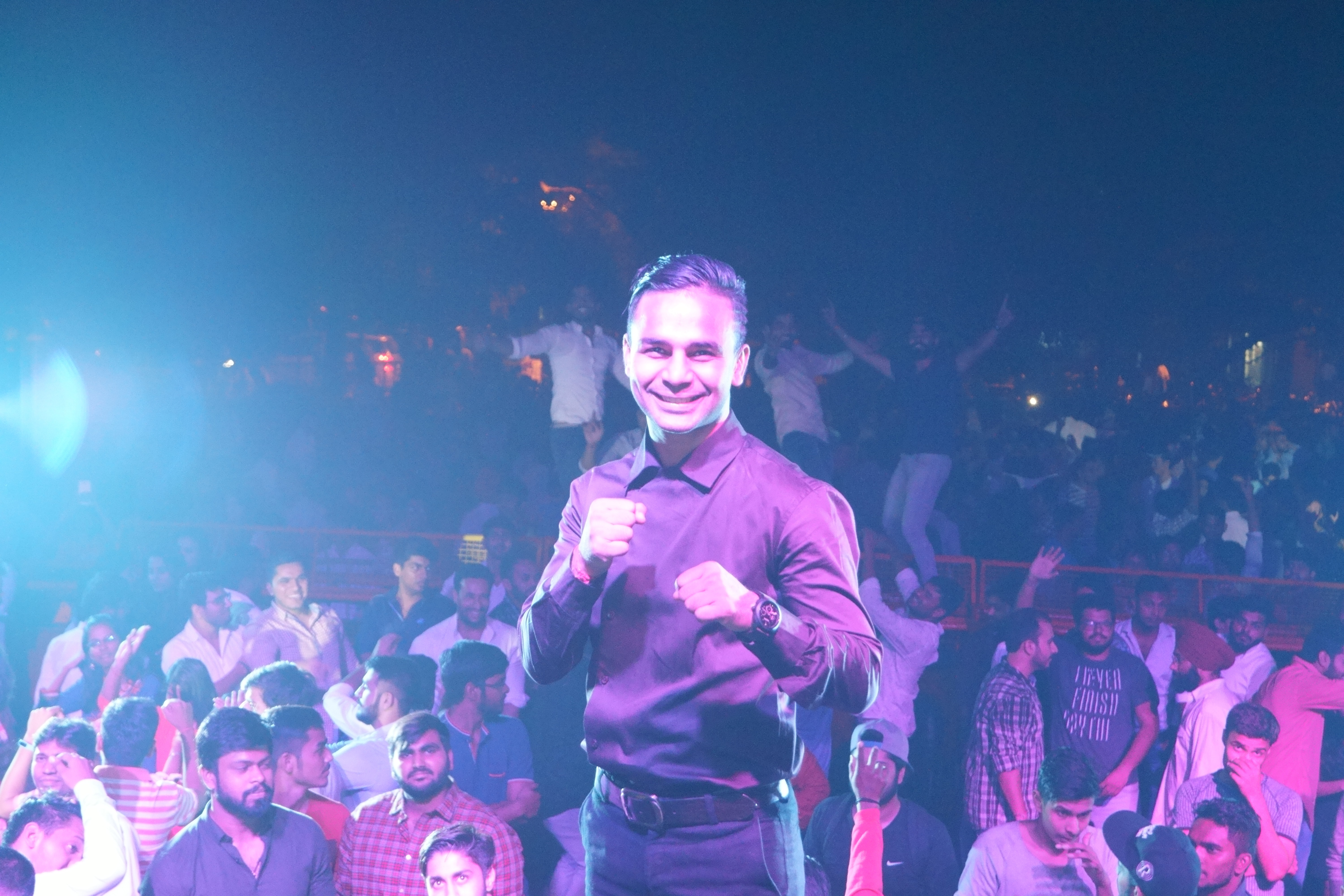
Gaurav Bidhuri at an event

== See also ==
- Tughlakabad (village)
- Tehkhand
- Khizrabad Village
- Old Pillanji Village
