= Tehkhand =

- Neighbourhood
- Country: India
- State: Delhi
- District: South East Delhi

Population
  - Total: 50−60 Thousands Approx.

Languages
  - Official: Hindi, English
- Time zone: UTC+5:30 (IST)
- PIN: 110020
- Lok Sabha constituency: South Delhi Lok Sabha
- Vidhan Sabha: Tughlakabad Assembly
- Municipal Corporation Ward: Tuglakabad Ward

Tehkhand also known as Tekhand is one of the oldest villages in South East district of New Delhi. It is situated Near Okhla Industrial Area. Tehkhand Depot of Delhi Transport Corporation is also situated near to the Tehkhand Village. Tehkhand is dominated by Mavi and Bidhuri clans of the Gurjar community .

== Notable people ==
- Sahi Ram, Three Times MLA from Tughlakabad Assembly.
- Nitin Mavi, Pro Kabaddi Player
- Abhishek Bidhuri, Youngest Councillor in Municipal Corporation of Delhi
- Sunil Verma Bidhuri, Former Councillor

== See also ==
- Tughlakabad Village
- Madanpur Khadar Village
- Khizrabad Village
- Old Pilanji Village
