= Khizrabad Village =

- Neighbourhood
- Location in Delhi, India
- Coordinates: 28.3421°N 77.1626°E
- Country: India
- State: Delhi
- District: South East

Population
  - Total: 30 Thousand Approx.

Languages
  - Official: Hindi, English
- Time zone: UTC+5:30 (IST)
- PIN: 110025
- Lok Sabha constituency: East Delhi Lok Sabha constituency
- Vidhan Sabha constituency: Okhla
- Civic agency: Zakir Nagar Ward

Khizrabad also known as Khidrabad is an old Village in South East district of Delhi. It is situated near New Friends Colony and Taimoor Nagar. This village is set to consist of the descendants of Baba Rupa. Baba Rupa moved from Madanpur Khadar Village to Khizrabad Village. According to Villagers, Khidr-abad means "land of Khizr (a mythological figure who is said to live near seas and other waterbodies)" since the village is situated at the Banks of Yamuna.

== History ==
According to villagers, the village is about 800 years old, and for initial years it was inhabited by Kahar Caste. But around Samwat 1400, One Baba Rupa shifted to Khizrabad from Madanpur Khadar Village. the current generation is descendants of Baba Rupa Bidhuri.

== Notable people ==
- Kunwar Bidhuri – Ranji Player, Delhi

== See also ==
- Tughlakabad Village
- Tehkhand
- Madanpur Khadar Village
- Fatehpur Beri Village
- Old Pilanji Village
