= Dargah Mai Sahiba =

Dargah in India

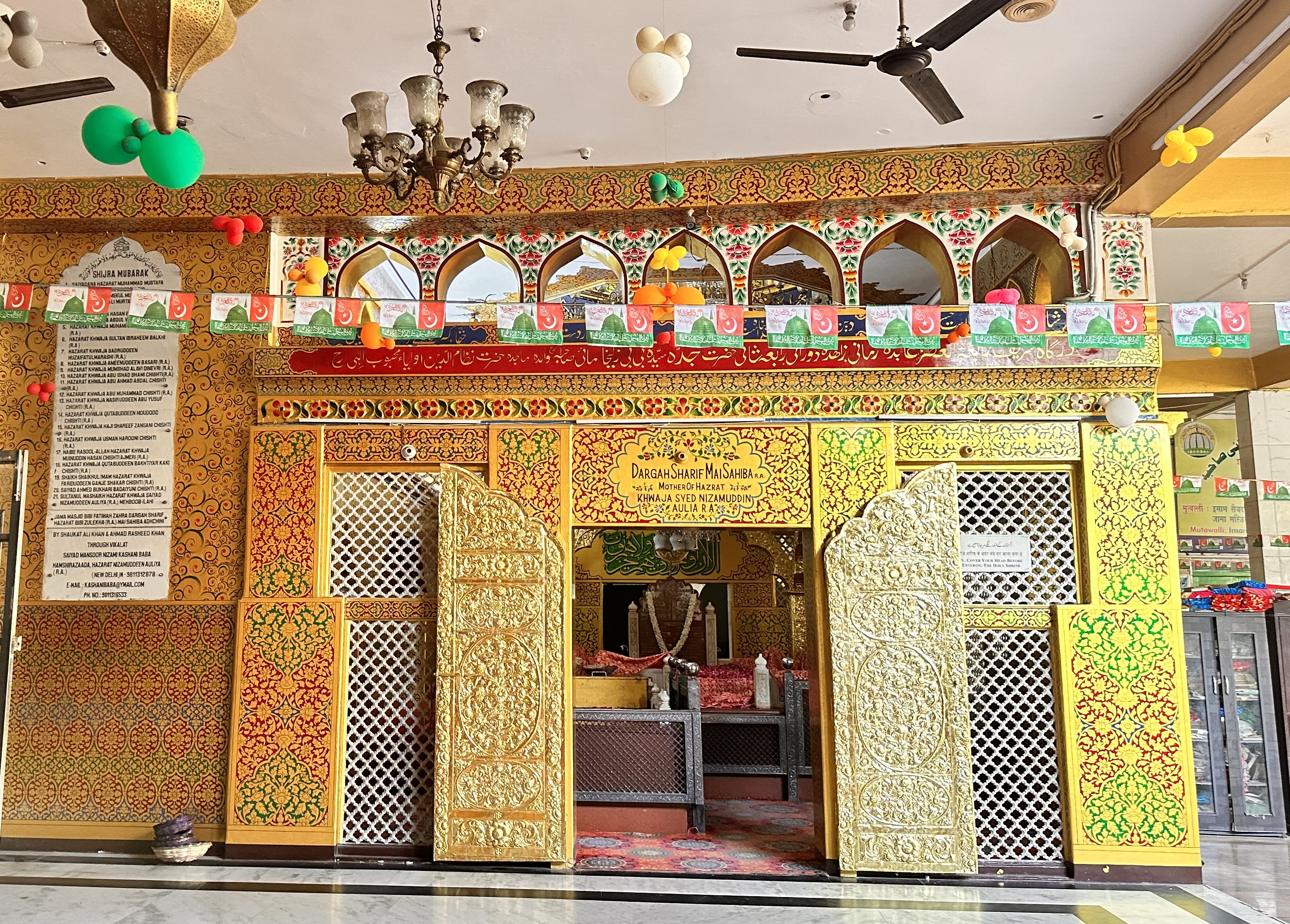
- The interior of the dargah, in 2023

- Location of the dargah and mosque complex in Delhi

Religion
- Affiliation: Sunni Islam
- Sect: Sufi Chishti Order
- Festival: Urs (29th Jumada al-Thani)
- Ecclesiastical or organizational status: Dargah and Friday mosque
- Status: Active
- Dedication: "Mai Sahiba" Bibi Zulekha

Location
- Location: Adhchini, Sri Aurobindo Marg, South Delhi, Delhi
- Country: India
- Interactive map of Dargah Mai Sahiba
- Administration: Delhi Waqf Board
- Coordinates: 28°32′15″N 77°11′50″E

Architecture
- Type: Indo-Islamic architecture
- Style: Tughlaq architecture
- Completed: c. 1250 CE

Specifications
- Direction of façade: West
- Dome: One (maybe more)
- Shrine: One
- Materials: Marble, metal, concrete, plaster, paint, red stone, rubble stone and modern brick

The Dargah Mai Sahiba is a Sufi mausoleum complex, affiliated with the Chishti Order, situated near Sri Aurobindo Marg, in the Adhchini village of South Delhi district of the state of Delhi, India. It is the shrine of "Mai Sahiba" Bibi Zulekha, the mother of 14th-century Sufi saint Hazrat Nizamuddin Auliya.

The dargah is popular among women because they are allowed inside the sanctum sanctorum of the shrine, unlike the majority of dargahs in India. The complex includes a Friday mosque, called Jama Masjid Bibi Fatima Zahra.

== History ==
Bibi Zulekha's parents migrated to the Indian subcontinent due to the Mongol invasions that affected their hometown of Bukhara in Central Asia. They settled in Badayun, located approximately 240 kilometres (150 mi) northwest of Delhi. Bibi Zulekha was married to Khwaja Syed Ahmad, and together they had a daughter and a son. Following the death of her husband when their son was two years old, Bibi Zulekha relocated to Delhi with her children a few years later.

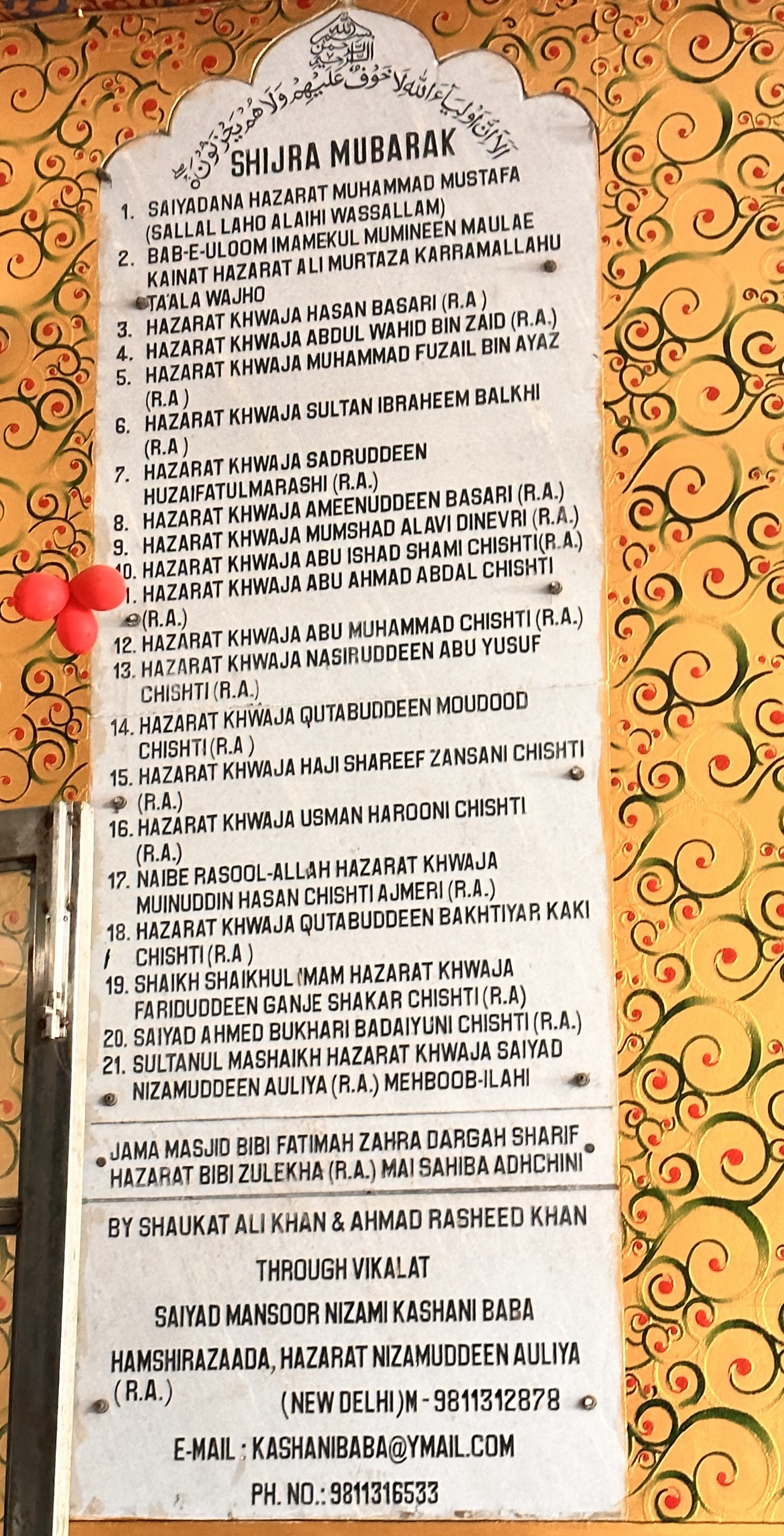
Shajra Mubarak (Silsila) (Spiritual lineage of Chishti Order) at Dargah Hazrat Mai Sahiba

Mai Sahiba died in 1250 CE, long before her son became recognised as a great mystic. She and her daughter Bibi Zainab are buried in the same room where they lived. On the 29th of each month in the Islamic calendar, when the moon is new, Hazrat Nizamuddin would visit his mother and pray. He lived at Chilla Sharif, located behind Humayun's Tomb, with the Yamuna River flowing alongside his home in Ghiyaspur.

== Culture ==
The shrine attracts hundreds of devotees from all religions particularly women, who believe that Mai Sahiba cannot endure the sorrow of women and grants them her blessings. Wednesdays are regarded as Mai Sahiba's favourite days, drawing over 5,000 devotees each week.

== Annual urs ==
Each year, on the 29th of Jamad al Thani month of the Islamic calendar, the three-day annual urs celebrations commence with special prayers, during which qawwals from around the world participate in an overnight recital to commemorate the death anniversary of the great woman. Devotees are served vegetarian food, along with Mai Sahiba's favourite dishes, chanaa and aloo pulao, known as tehri.

== Architecture ==
The burial chamber or the central sanctorum has the graves of Mai Sahab Bibi Zulekha and her daughter, Bibi Zainab alias Bibi Jannat. The main grave is situated on a raised platform measuring approximately 1.7 meters by 0.88 meters and stands 0.5 meters high. The grave is enclosed within a modern double structure, with one wall situated inside the other, featuring doorways on the east side. To the southeast, there was a now-ruined Baoli, of which no traces remain.

The grave itself is surrounded by metal latticework and is floored with marble cladding. The original inscription remains visible. The original foundation is constructed of rubble masonry up to the plinth level, while the remaining structure is made of concrete and marble. Decorative elements include reinforced concrete (RCC) jali, and the site is finished with plaster and paint. Modern brick masonry has been utilised in various additions and extensions, with marble and red sandstone used for roofing and parts of the flooring, while the rest of the floor is also marble.

=== Mosque ===
The dargah features a covered verandah and a mosque, Jama Masjid Bibi Fatima Zahra, that contains a framed picture of Gunbad-e-Khazra and the Kaaba. The mosque also contains the graves of Bibi Hoor and Bibi Noor, the daughters of Sheikh Najibuddin Mutawakkil (Baba Farid’s brother), who were the owners of the house where Mai Sahiba resided. It is within this context that the dargah and mosque were constructed.

== Location ==
Located behind the shops of the Adhchini market on Sri Aurobindo Marg, in South Delhi, the dargah was once visible from Mehrauli when the area was primarily farmland, historically referred to as Sarai Namak.

== Gallery ==
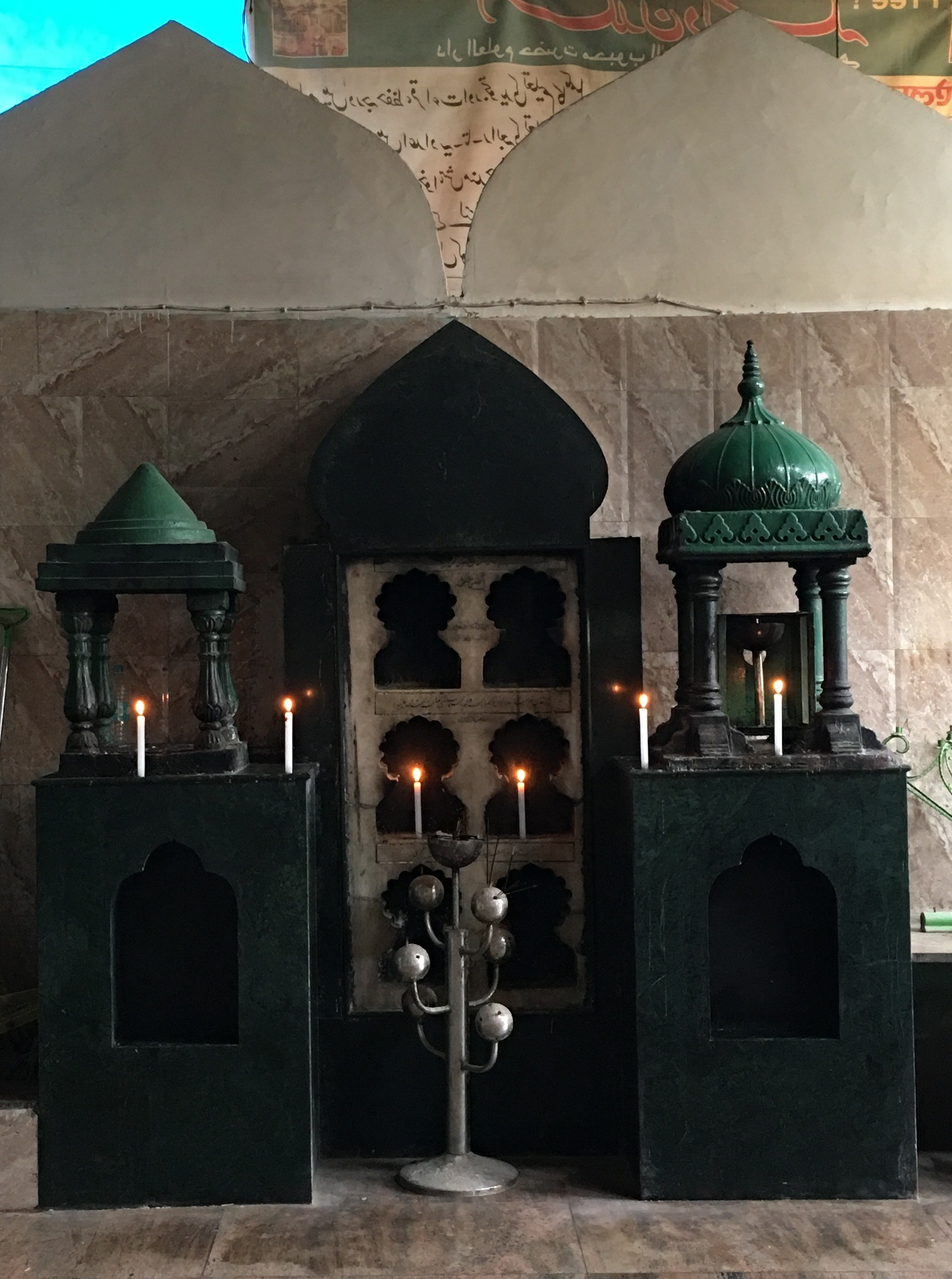
The lamping area at the dargah

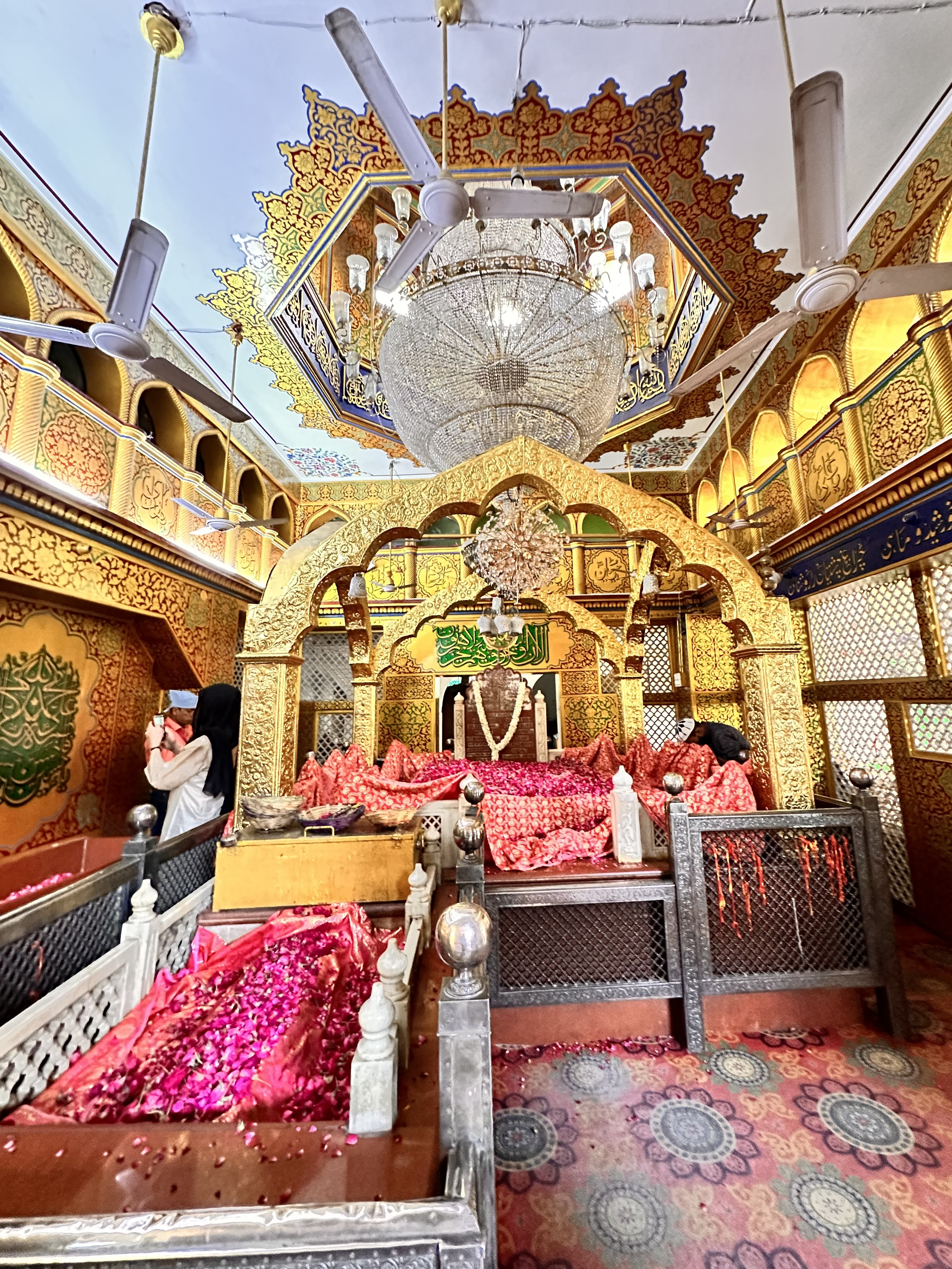
Graves of Mai Sahiba (bigger) and her daughter (smaller)

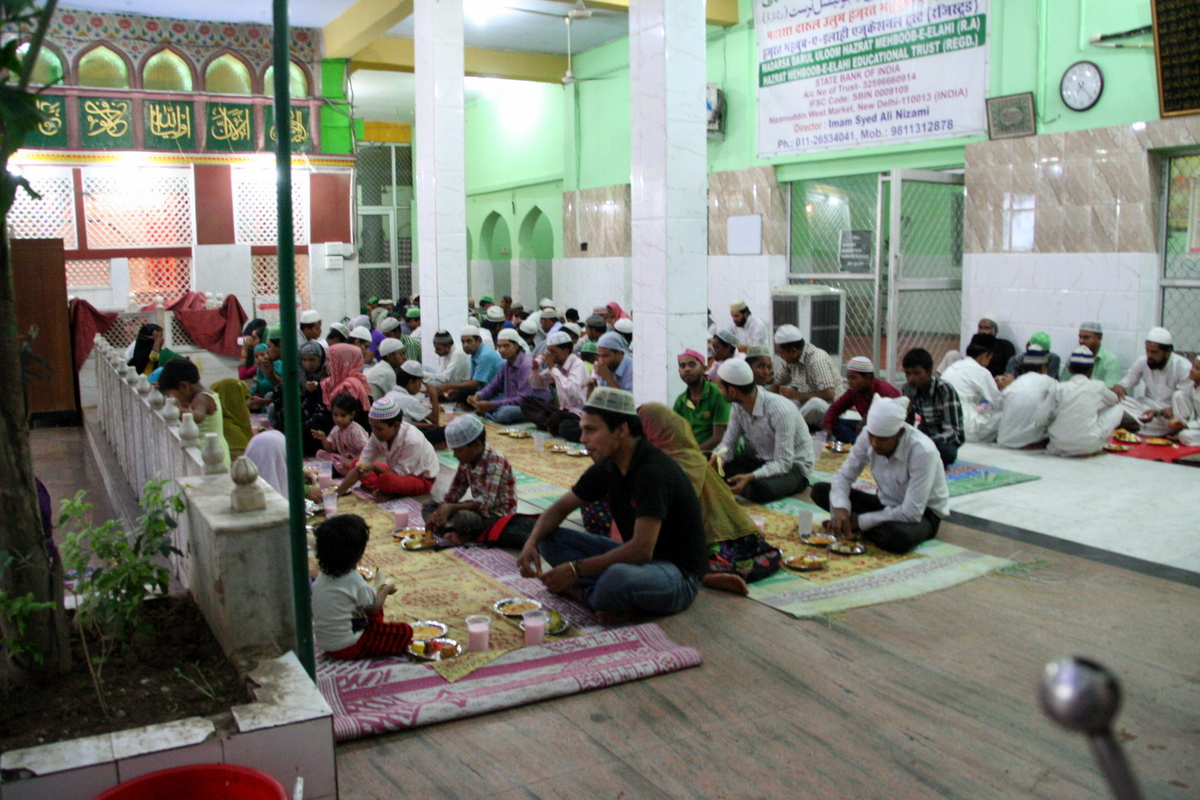
Iftar at Mai Saheba Dargah

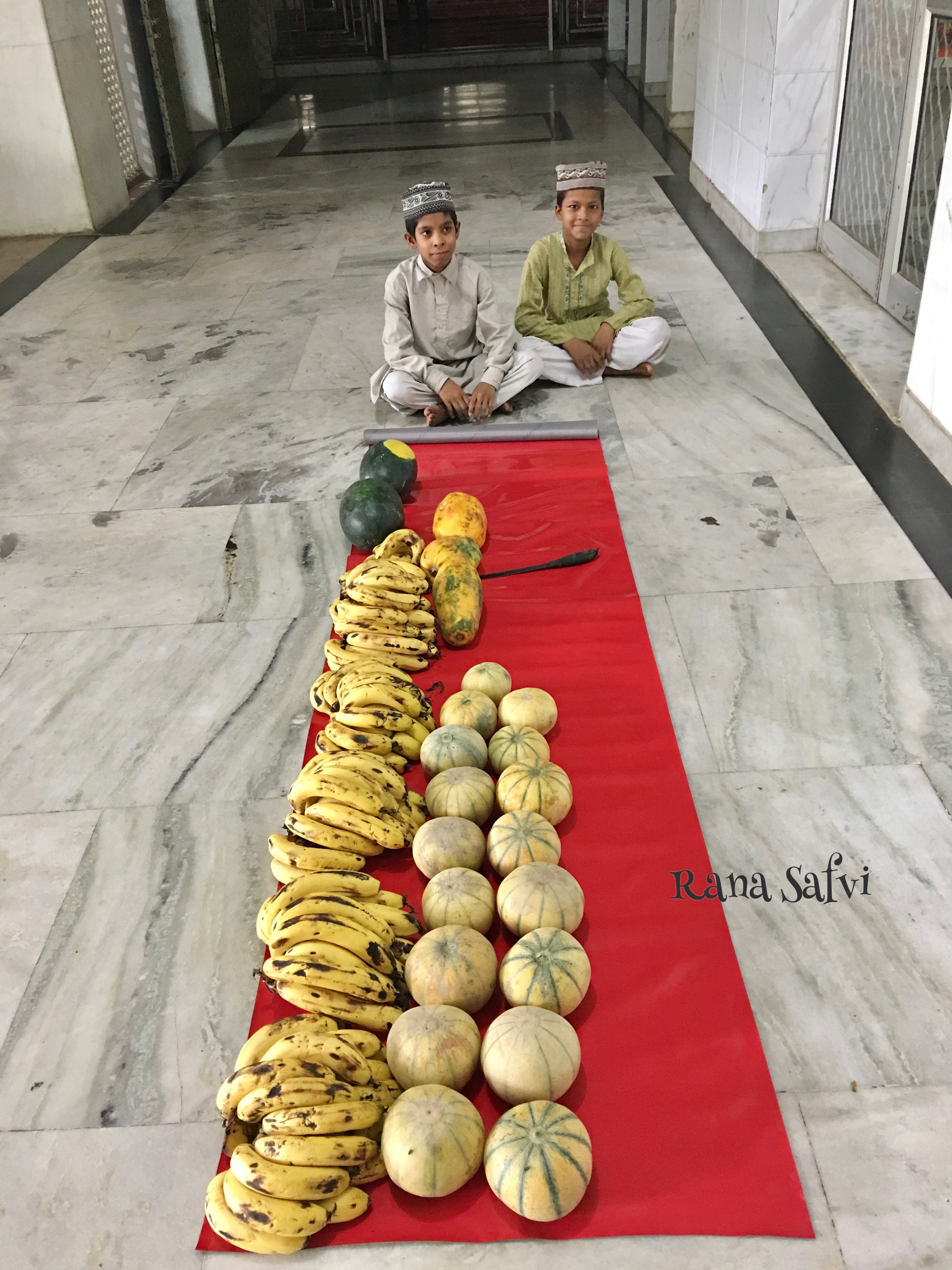
Dastarkhān at the dargah

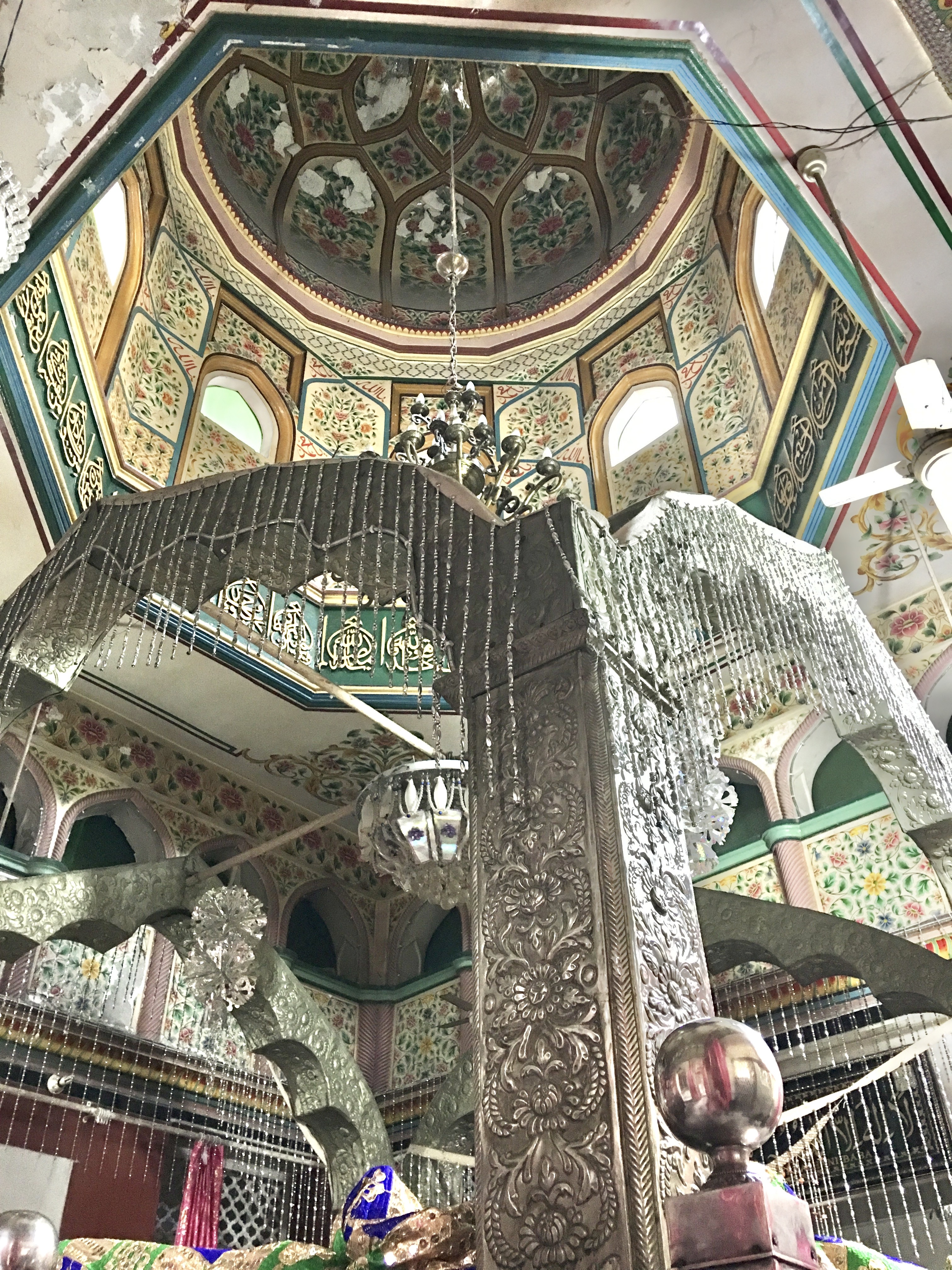
The metal latticework and the interior dome of the dargah

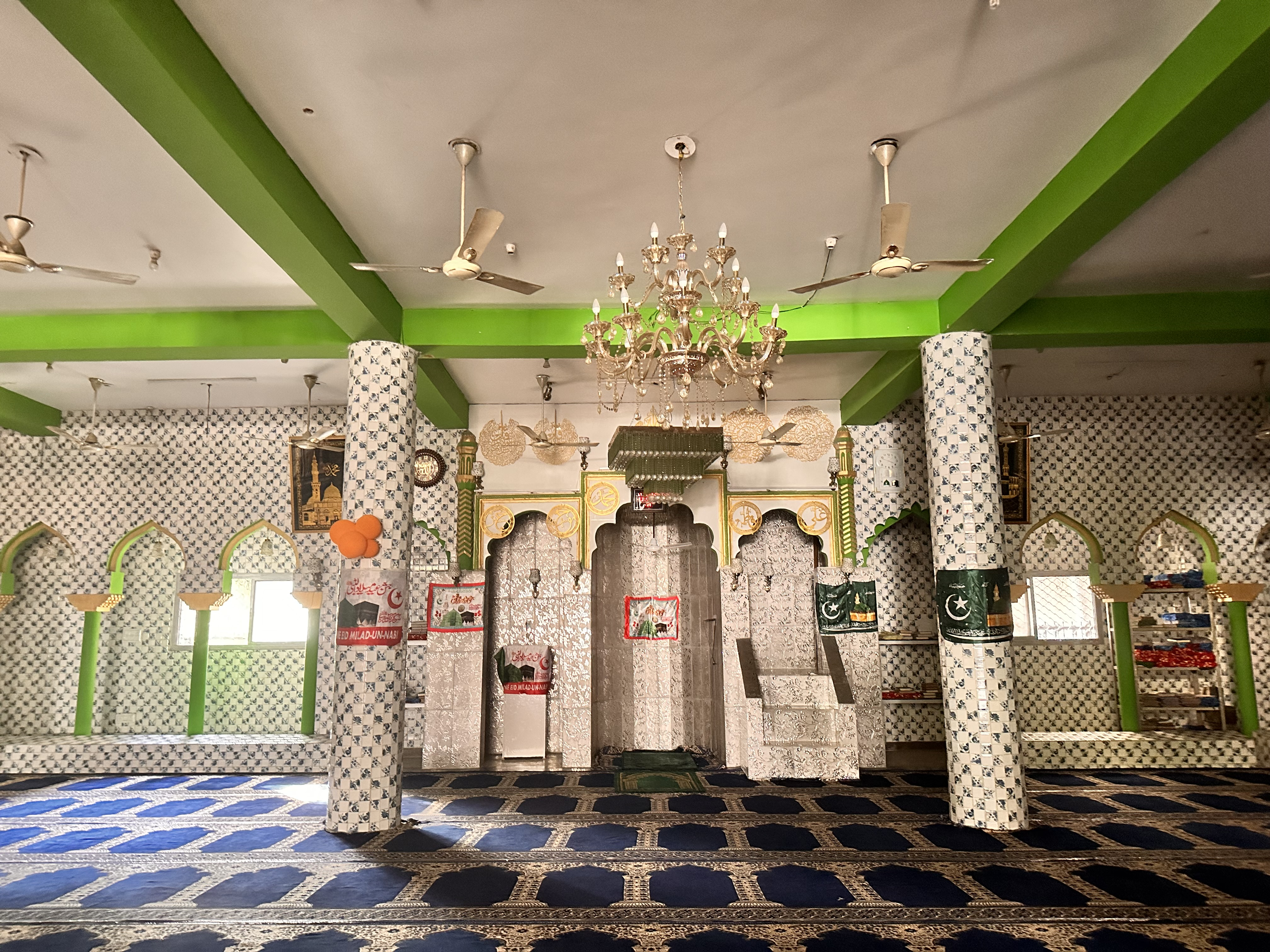
The Friday mosque in the dargah complex

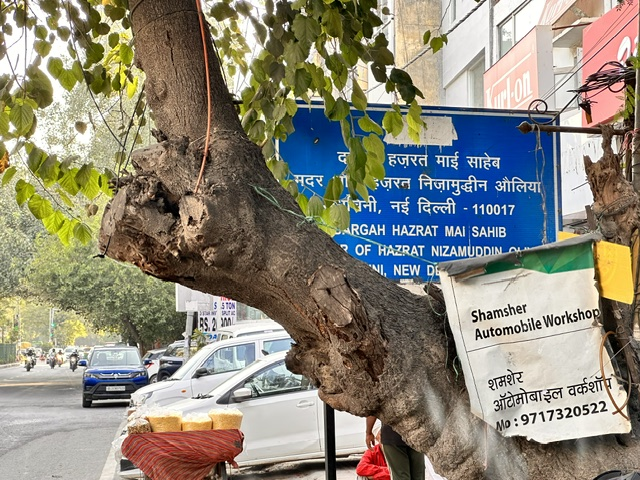
Signboard at Sri Aurobindo Marg

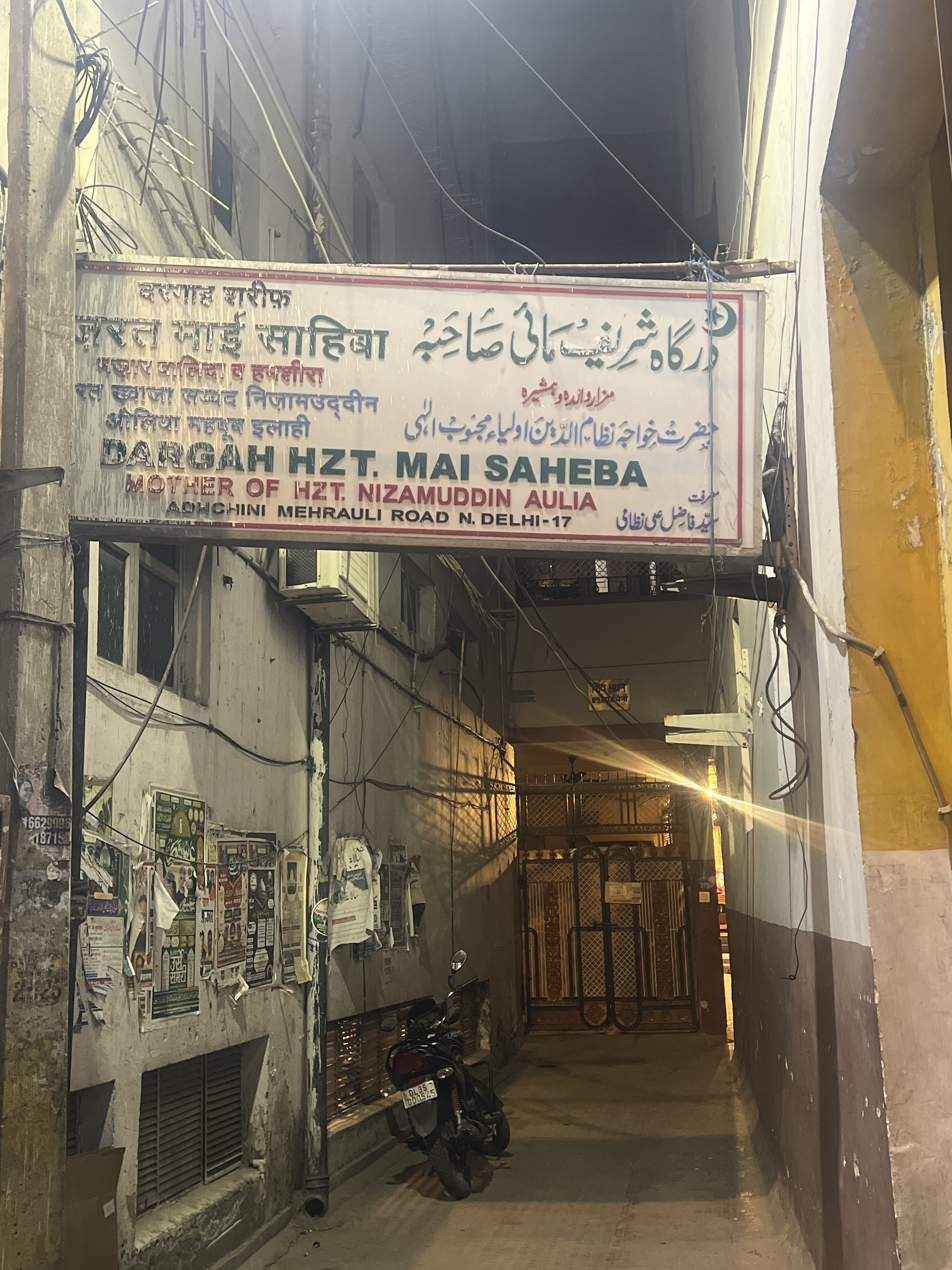
Dargah Gali (lane towards the shrine)

== See also ==
- List of dargahs in India
- Sufism in India
- Islam in India
