= Khaja Bandanawaz University =

Private university in Karnataka, India

- Established: 2018
- Affiliations: UGC
- Chancellor: Dr. Syed Muhammad Ali Al Hussaini
- Vice-Chancellor: Ali Raza Moosvi
- Location: Kalaburagi, Karnataka, India
- Colours: Red; Dark Blue
- Website: www.kbn.university

Khaja Bandanawaz University (KBNU), named after Sufi saint Bande Nawaz, is a private Islamic University located at Kalaburagi, Karnataka, India. It is a religious minority university established in 2018 by the Khaja Bandanawaz Educational Society under the Khaja Bandanawaz University Act, 2018, following the approval of the Bill in the Karnataka Legislative Assembly in February 2018. The university hosts about twenty colleges, including colleges previously under Khaja Bandanawaz Educational Society such as Khaja Banda Nawaz College of Engineering, Khaja Banda Nawaz Institute of Medical Sciences and a newly formed law college. The founding chancellor is Syed Shah Khusro Hussaini, president of the Khaja Bandanawaz Educational Society, and the vice-chancellor (VC) is to be Abdul Jaleel Khan M. Pathan (A. M. Pathan), formerly VC of Central University of Karnataka.

== Academics ==
Khaja Bandanawaz University offers undergraduate, postgraduate and PhD programmes in the fields of engineering & technology, science, medical science, arts, commerce, management, humanities and social science. Some of the courses are BSc, BA, MA and MSc.
