= Syed Shah Mohammed Hussaini =

Indian Sufi scholar, educator, and social worker (1922–2007)

- سید شاہ محمد حسینی
- Born: 29 December 1922; Hyderabad, Hyderabad State, British India
- Died: 30 March 2007 (aged 84); Hyderabad, India
- Occupations: Scholar, educator, Sajjada Nashin
- Organization: Khwaja Education Society
- Known for: Sufi scholar, educationalist, social worker
- Notable work: Establishment of educational institutions in Gulbarga
- Title: Sajjada Nashin of Dargah Khwaja Banda Nawaz
- Spouse: Moinjahan Begum
- Children: 5, including Syed Shah Khusro Hussaini
- Parent: Syed Shah Muhammad Al Hussaini
- Awards: Padma Shri (2004)

Syed Shah Mohammed Hussaini (29 December 1922 – 30 March 2007) was an Indian Sufi scholar, educational philanthropist, and social worker. He was the Sajjada Nashin (custodian) of the Dargah of Khwaja Banda Nawaz in Gulbarga, Karnataka. Known for his contributions to promoting education and community welfare, he established several educational institutions through the Khwaja Education Society.

== Early life and career ==
Hussaini was born on 29 December 1922 in Hyderabad and belonged to a family deeply rooted in Sufi traditions. He assumed the role of Sajjada Nashin at a young age, succeeding in the spiritual leadership of the Khwaja Banda Nawaz Dargah, one of South India's significant Sufi centers.

== Academic contributions ==
In the late 1950s, recognizing the educational needs of the region, Hussaini founded the Khwaja Education Society. Under his leadership, the society launched numerous institutions, including the Khwaja Banda Nawaz Medical College, Engineering College, and various schools, with a focus on providing access to modern education while preserving religious values. This initiative expanded educational opportunities in Gulbarga and beyond, emphasizing disciplines such as engineering, medicine, and the humanities.

== Positions and honours ==
=== Positions ===
Apart from his educational initiatives, Hussaini served as a member of the Karnataka Legislative Council from 1990 to 1996 and held a vice-presidential role in the All India Muslim Personal Law Board. He was a respected figure across various Sufi and religious communities, with his work focused on fostering unity and welfare within the community.

=== Honours ===
In 2004, Hussaini received the Padma Shri in the field of Literature and Education, one of India's highest civilian honors, acknowledging his contributions to education and public service.

== Death and legacy ==
Hussaini died on 30 March 2007 at age 85. He was succeeded by his eldest son, Syed Shah Khusro Hussaini, as Sajjada Nashin. His legacy includes a broad network of educational institutions and a commitment to public service, which has influenced both the local community and broader Indian society.
