= Sayyed Shah Najmuddin Qalandar =

13th-century Indian Muslim scholar

Syed Najmuddin Ghawsud Dahar Qalandar
- Title: Qutub ul Aqtaab; Ghawsud Dahar; Piran E Dhar

Personal life
- Born: 635 AH (1237/1238 CE) Delhi, India
- Died: Nalchha, Dhar
- Parent: Nizamuddin Gaznawi (father)
- Other name: Nazmuddin Qalandar

Religious life
- Religion: Islam
- Denomination: Qalandariyya
- Lineage: Syed

Muslim leader
- Based in: Nalchha, Dhar
- Period in office: 18th/19th century
- Predecessor: Nizamuddin Auliya; Hazrat Khizr Rumi
- Successor: Hazrat Qutubuddin Qutub Binadil Qalandar; Hazrat Maja Qalandar; Hazrat Basit Qalandar

Syed Shah Najmuddin Ghawsud Dahar Qalandar (Urdu: سید نجمددیں غوث الدہر قلندر, Hindi: सय्यद शाह नजमुद्दीन गवसुद दहार क़लन्दर) well known as Qutub ul Aqtaab (1209-1324 CE, probably born at Delhi, India) was a Qalandar and Sunni Muslim scholar, Sufi saint of the Chishti Order, and one of the most famous Sufis on the Indian subcontinent who lived and taught in India. He traced his lineage to prophet Muhammad through Imam Hussain.

Initially Hazrat Nizamuddin Auliya made him his Mureed and later said him to go to Rum and get the Faiz from Hazrat Shah Khizr Rumi Qalandar who gave him the title "Ghawsud Dahar", and made him his Khalifa, after receiving khilafat from him, Nazmuddin went to Arab, Ajam, China and then he finally settled in Malwa region of Madhya Pradesh, India.

== Dargah ==
Syed Najmuddin Ghawsud Dahar Qalandar’s shrine or dargah is at Hazrat Syed Shah Najmuddin Qalander Ghawsud Dahar R. A. Nalchha Sharif, situated on the Dhar-Mandav road in the city of Nalchha, Dhar of Indian state Madhya Pradesh, which is a place of pilgrimage and visited millions of devotees every year.

== Urs ==
Nazmuddin Qalandar's annual Urs is held on the 20 and 21 Dhu al-Hijjah – the last month of the Muslim lunar calendar – and brings thousands pilgrims from all over India and abroad.

== See also ==
- List of dargahs in Delhi
- List of mosques in Delhi
- Sufism in India
