= Syed Shah Khusro Hussaini =

Indian Sufi educator and spiritual leader (1945–2024)

Dr. Syed Shah Khusro Hussaini

Sajjada Nashin of the Dargah of Khaja Banda Nawaz Gesudaraz
- In office April 2007 – 6 November 2024
- Preceded by: Syed Shah Mohammed Hussaini
- Succeeded by: Syed Muhammad Ali Hussaini

First Chancellor of Khaja Bandanawaz University
- In office August 2018 – 2024
- Preceded by: office established

Vice President of the All India Muslim Personal Law Board
- In office 3 June 2023 – 6 November 2024

Personal life
- Born: 10 September 1945 Hyderabad, Hyderabad State, British India
- Died: 6 November 2024 (aged 79) Gulbarga, Karnataka, India
- Children: Syed Muhammad Ali Hussaini, Syed Mustafa Hussaini
- Parent: Syed Shah Mohammed Hussaini (father)
- Education: Grammar School, Hyd; Osmania University; McGill University
- Known for: Leadership of Khwaja Banda Nawaz Dargah, Education Advocacy, Sufi Scholarship
- Occupation: Sufi scholar, educator, custodian of Dargah, writer, poet

Religious life
- Religion: Islam
- Denomination: Sunni Islam

Syed Shah Khusro Hussaini (10 September 1945 – 6 November 2024) was an Indian Sufi scholar, educational philanthropist, and Sajjada Nashin of the Dargah of Khwaja Banda Nawaz Gesudaraz in Gulbarga, Karnataka. He was known for his efforts to promote Sufism, education, and social welfare, making significant contributions to spiritual and educational services in South India.

== Early life and education ==
Syed Shah Khusro Hussaini was born on 10 September 1945 in a Sufi family in Hyderabad. He traced his lineage back to Khwaja Banda Nawaz Gesudaraz, a revered 14th-century saint of the Chishti order.

He received his early education at the Grammar School in Hyderabad and graduated from Osmania University, Hyderabad, in 1965. In 1967, he earned a master's degree in Arabic from the same university.

He pursued higher studies at McGill University in Canada, where he completed his Master's in Islamic Studies and Sufism in 1975.

In 2008, Gulbarga University awarded him an honorary doctorate for his remarkable contributions.

== Career ==
Hussaini played a key role in establishing the Khaja Bandanawaz Institute of Medical Sciences (KBNIMS) in Gulbarga in 2000.

After the passing of his father, Syed Shah Mohammed Hussaini, in 2007, he assumed the role of Sajjada Nashin (custodian) of the dargah of Khaja Banda Nawaz Gesudaraz, continuing the legacy of religious, social, and educational services.

From 3 June 2023 until his death, he served as the vice-president of the All India Muslim Personal Law Board.

After becoming the successor to his father on 3 April 2007, he made significant changes at the organizational, administrative, and functional levels of the Khwaja Education Society and expanded the existing institutions. He established Khaja Bandanawaz University in August 2018.

== Awards and honours ==
Hussaini received several awards and honors in recognition of his contributions to education and Sufism. He was widely respected for his deep, scholarly understanding of Sufism and his administrative skills. In 2017, he was awarded the prestigious Karnataka Rajyotsava Award for excellence in education by the government of Karnataka, further highlighting his contributions to the field.

On 10 December 2018, Hussaini was conferred the Mohsin-e-Millat Award by the Sir Syed Awareness Forum in recognition of his educational services.

In February 2019, the Indian postal service honored him with a commemorative stamp for his services.

== Literary works ==
Hussaini was a writer and poet with works focusing on Sufism and Islamic teachings. His notable publications include Sayyid Muhammad al-Husayni-i Gisudaraz (721/1321–825/1422): On Sufism and a Naʽat collection titled Wa Rafa'na Laka Dhikrak, and Bund Samā. His contributions to Sufi literature and Islamic scholarship are widely acknowledged.

== Death and legacy ==
Hussaini died on 6 November 2024, at the age of 79. His Namaz-e-Janaza (funeral prayer) was held the following day at Masjid Burj, followed by his burial beside his father's grave within the dargah premises. The final rites were performed by his sons, Syed Muhammad Ali Hussaini and Syed Mustafa Hussaini, in accordance with Islamic customs.

Thousands of mourners from Karnataka and neighboring states gathered to pay their last respects. Dignitaries, including AIMIM president Asaduddin Owaisi, state ministers, and various officials, attended the service, and the State Reserve Police honored him with a gun salute. Deputy Chief Minister D. K. Shivakumar and other political leaders also expressed condolences on his death.

Hussaini was survived by two sons and three daughters. His eldest son, Syed Shah Ali Hussaini, succeeded him as Sajjada Nashin. The institutions he founded, including Khwaja Banda Nawaz University, continue to promote educational and social development in South India, preserving his vision of spiritual and academic enrichment.
