= Nizamuddin Auliya =

Indian Sufi saint (1237–1325)

Khawaja; Awliya; Mahbub-e-Ilahi; Sultan-ul-Mashaikh; Muhammad Nizamuddin Auliya
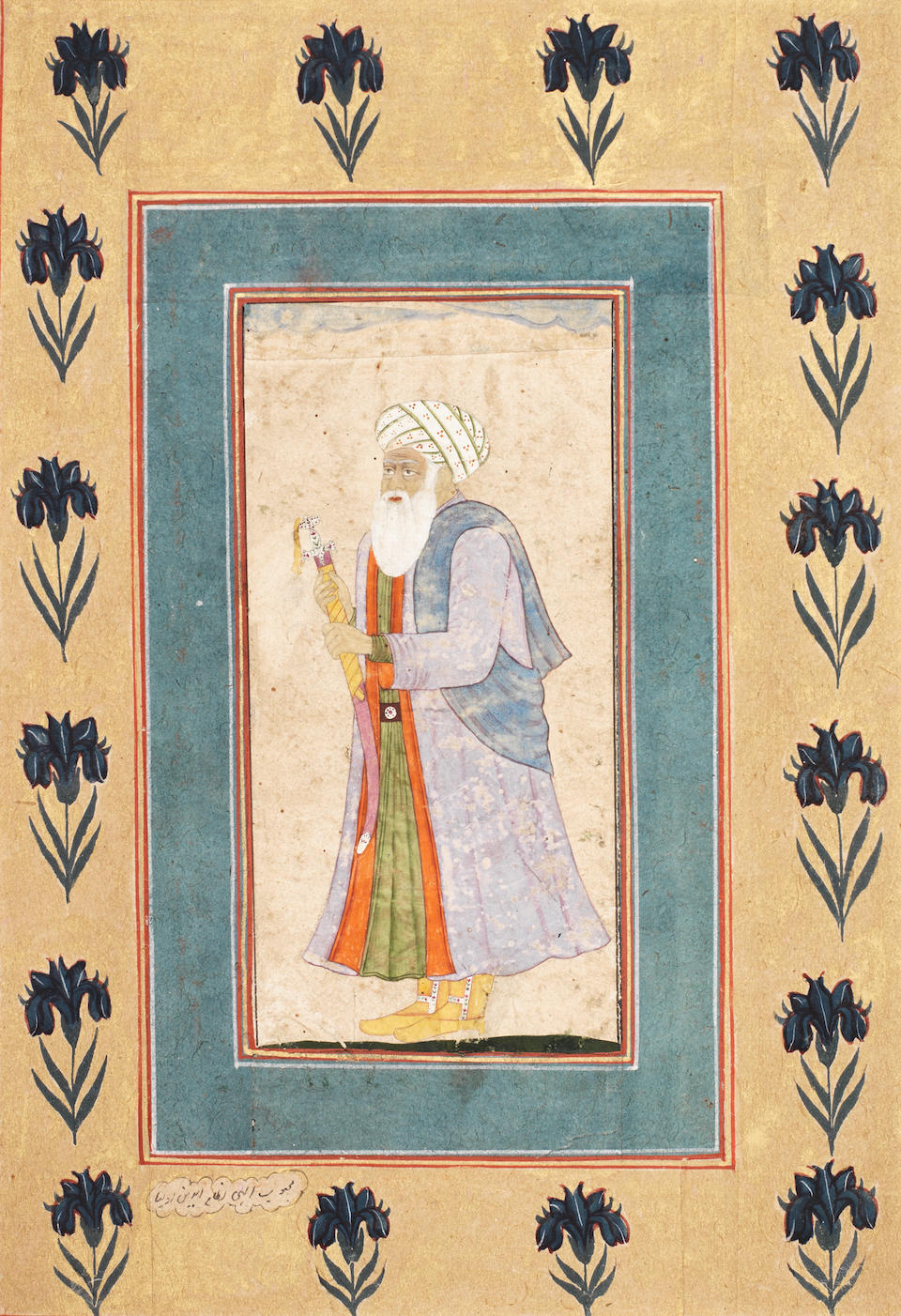
- Mughal Painting of Nizamuddin Auliya
- Title: Khawaja Syed

Personal life
- Born: 1238 AD/ 635 AH Badayun, Delhi Sultanate
- Died: 3 April 1325 AD/ 18 Rabi Al-Thani 725 AH (aged 86-87) Delhi, Delhi Sultanate
- Resting place: Nizamuddin Dargah
- Parents: Syed Abdullah bin Ahmad al Hussaini Badayuni (father); Mai Sahiba Bibi Zulekha (mother)
- Relatives: Bibi Zainab alias Bibi Jannat (sister)

Religious life
- Religion: Islam
- Denomination: Sunni
- Jurisprudence: Hanafi
- Tariqa: Chishti order
- Creed: Maturidi

Muslim leader
- Based in: Delhi
- Period in office: Late 13th century and early 14th century
- Predecessor: Fariduddin Ganjshakar
- Students: Amir Khusrow, Nasiruddin Chiragh Dehlavi, Jahaniyan Jahangasht, Akhi Siraj Aainae Hind, Burhanuddin Gharib, Syed Najmuddin Ghawsud Dahar Qalandar, Sheikh Musa, Maulana Kamaluddin Chishty Piran-e-Dhar, Syed Ahmad Baad-e-Paa

Khawaja Syed Muhammad b. Ahmad Ali al-Badaoni al-Bukhari, popularly called Nizamuddin Auliya (sometimes spelled Awliya; 1238 – 3 April 1325), also known as Hazrat Nizamuddin (lit. 'Holy Nizamuddin'), Sultan-ul-Mashaikh (lit. 'Leader of the pious') and Mahbub-e-Ilahi (lit. 'Beloved of God'), was an Indian Sunni Muslim scholar, Sufi saint of the Chishti Order, and is one of the most famous Sufis from the Indian subcontinent. His predecessors were Fariduddin Ganjshakar, Qutbuddin Bakhtiyar Kaki, and Moinuddin Chishti, who were the masters of the Chishti spiritual chain or silsila in the Indian subcontinent.

Nizamuddin Auliya, like his predecessors, stressed love as a means of realising God. For him his love of God implied a love of humanity. His vision of the world was marked by a highly evolved sense of religious pluralism and kindness. It is claimed by the 14th century historiographer Ziauddin Barani that his influence on the Muslims of Delhi was such that a paradigm shift was effected in their outlook towards worldly matters. People began to be inclined towards mysticism and prayers and remaining aloof from the world. It is also believed that Ghiyasuddin Tughlaq, the founder of Tughluq dynasty, interacted with Nizamuddin. Initially, they used to share good relationship but soon this got embittered and relation between Ghiyas-ud-din Tughluq and Nizamuddin Auliya never been reformed due to opinion disharmony and their antagonism resulted regular disputes between them during that era.

== Life ==
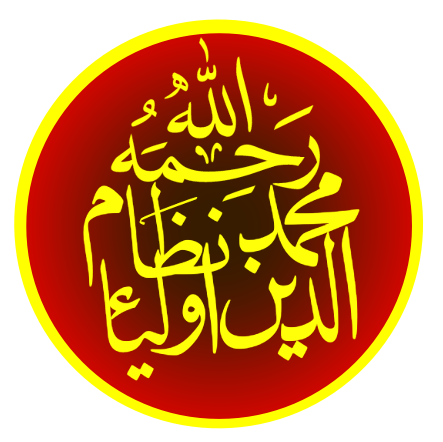
Calligraphy of Nizamuddin

Nizamuddin Auliya was born in a Sayyid family in Badayun, Uttar Pradesh. At the age of five, after the death of his father, Syed Abdullah Bukhari Badayuni, he came to Delhi with his mother, Bibi Zulekha. His biography finds mention in Ain-i-Akbari, a 16th-century document written by Mughal Emperor Akbar's vizier, Abu'l-Fazl ibn Mubarak.

At the age of twenty, Nizāmuddīn went to Ajodhan (the present Pakpattan Sharif in Punjab, Pakistan) and became a disciple of the Sufi saint Fariduddin Ganjshakar, commonly known as Baba Farid. Nizāmuddīn did not take up residence in Ajodhan but continued with his theological studies in Delhi while simultaneously starting the Sufi devotional practices and the prescribed litanies. He visited Ajodhan each year to spend the month of Ramadan in the presence of Baba Farid. It was on his third visit to Ajodhan that Baba Farid made him his successor. Shortly after that, when Nizāmuddīn returned to Delhi, he received news that Baba Farid had died.

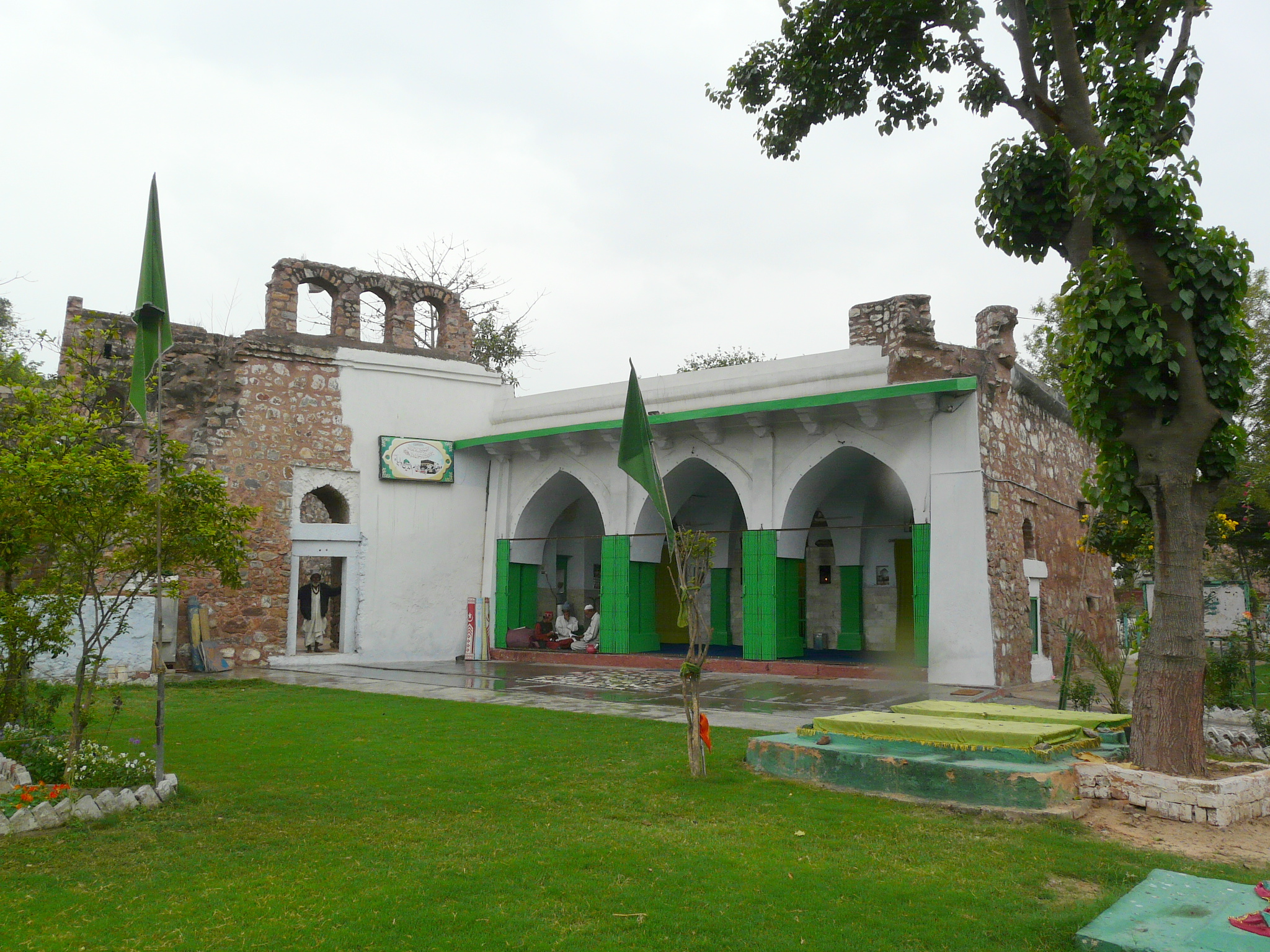
Chilla Nizamuddin Auliya, residence of Nizamuddin Auliya, towards the north-east from Humayun's tomb, Delhi

Nizāmuddīn lived at various places in Delhi, before finally settling down in Ghiyaspur, a neighbourhood in Delhi undisturbed by the noise and hustle of city life. He built his Khanqah here, a place where people from all walks of life were fed, where he imparted spiritual education to others and he had his own quarters. Before long, the Khanqah became a place thronged with all kinds of people, rich and poor alike.

Many of his disciples achieved spiritual height, including Shaikh Nasiruddin Chiragh Dehlavi, and Amir Khusro, noted scholar/singer, and the royal poet of the Delhi Sultanate. One of his disciples, Khwaja Zikr-Ullah Bakhtyar, is said to have explicitly discouraged the forceful conversion of Hindus to Islam.

He died on the morning of 3 April 1325. His shrine, the Nizamuddin Dargah, is located in Delhi. and the present structure was built in 1562. The shrine is visited by people of all faiths, through the year, though it becomes a place for special congregation during the death anniversaries, or Urs, of Nizamuddin Auliya and Amīr Khusrao, who is also buried at the Nizāmuddīn Dargāh.

== Key beliefs ==
Besides believing in the traditional Sufi ideas of embracing God within this life by destroying the ego and cleansing the soul, and that this is possible through considerable efforts involving Sufi practices, Nizamuddin also expanded and practised the unique features introduced by past saints of the Chisti Sufi order in India. These included:

- Emphasis on renunciation and having complete trust in God.
- The unity of mankind and shunning distinctions based on social and economic status.
- Helping the needy, feeding the hungry and being sympathetic to the oppressed.
- Strong disapproval of mixing with the Sultans, the princes and the nobles.
- Exhortation in making close contact with the poor and the downtrodden
- Adopting an uncompromising attitude towards all forms of political and social oppression.
- Adopting the permissibility of Sema.
- Holding the stance however that Sema is only permissible when musical instruments and dancing are not present.
- Holding the orthodox Sunni belief that musical instruments are prohibited.

Nizamuddin did not much bother about the theoretical aspects of Sufism, believing rather that it were the practical aspects that counted, as it was anyway not possible to describe the diversified mystical experiences called spiritual states or stations which a practicing Sufi encountered. He discouraged the demonstration of Karamat and emphasised that it was obligatory for the Auliya to hide the ability of Keramat from the commoners. He also was quite generous in accepting disciples. Usually whoever came to him saying that he wanted to become a disciple was granted that favour. This resulted in him being always surrounded by people from all strata of society.

== Ancestral history ==
Like many saints before him, Nizamuddin Aulia traced his lineage from the family of Muhammad.

== Spiritual history ==
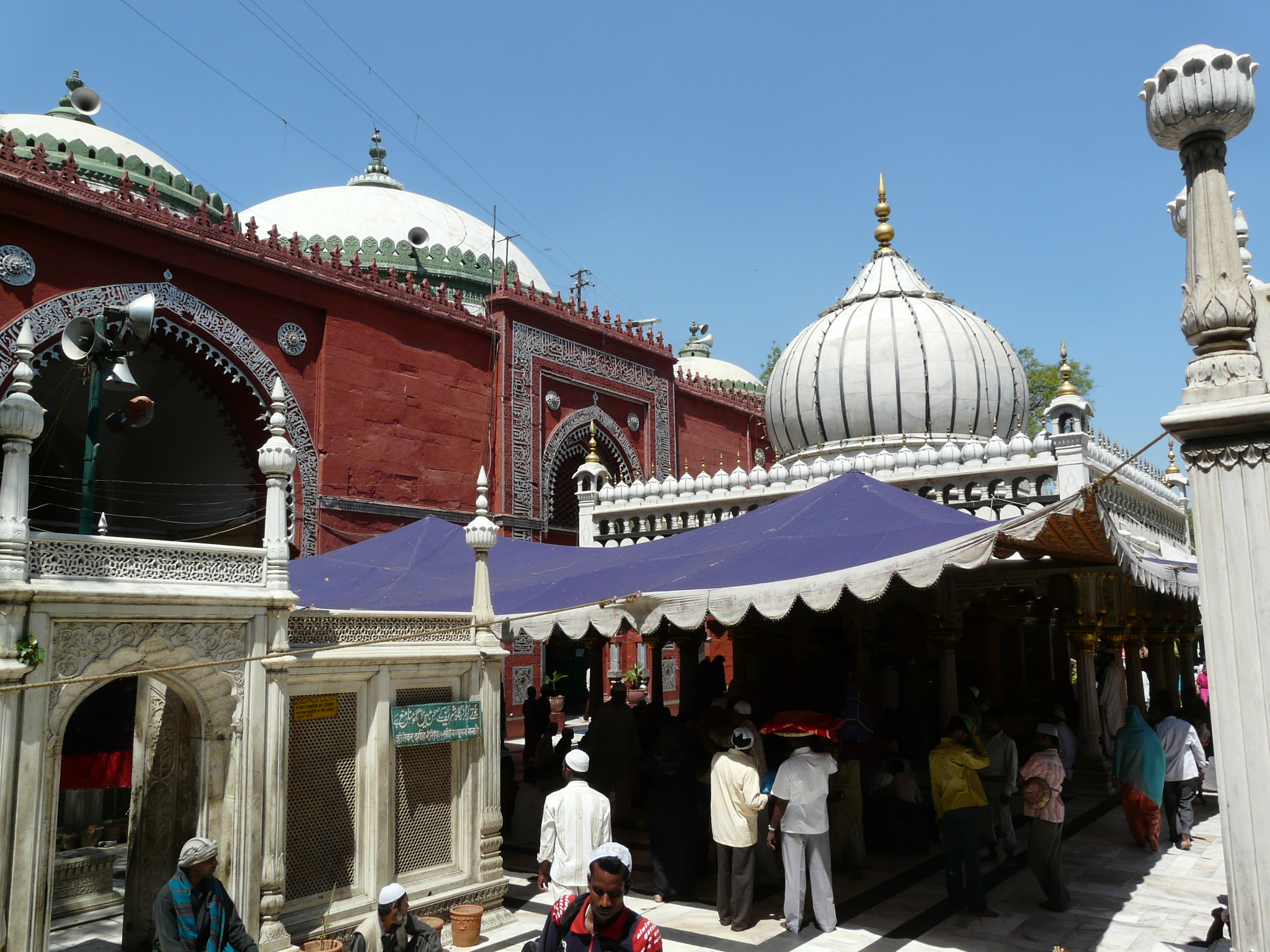
Nizamuddin Auliya's tomb (onion dome), Jama'at Khana Masjid (red wall) and Mughal princess Jahan Ara's tomb (doorway at left), all in Nizamuddin Dargah complex, Delhi

He was merely sixteen or seventeen years old when he first heard the name of Farīduddīn Ganjshakar, and feelings of love and respect arose in his heart right then. He narrates to his disciples that he never felt the same after hearing or even meeting any other Sufi. The love kept increasing like a burning fire. If his classmates would like to have some work out of him they used to invoke the name of Baba Farid, and he never refused anything asked in his name. He didn't feel the same for anyone else in his entire lifetime. He became his disciple after completing his studies at the age of 20. He visited him thrice in his lifetime.

== Students ==
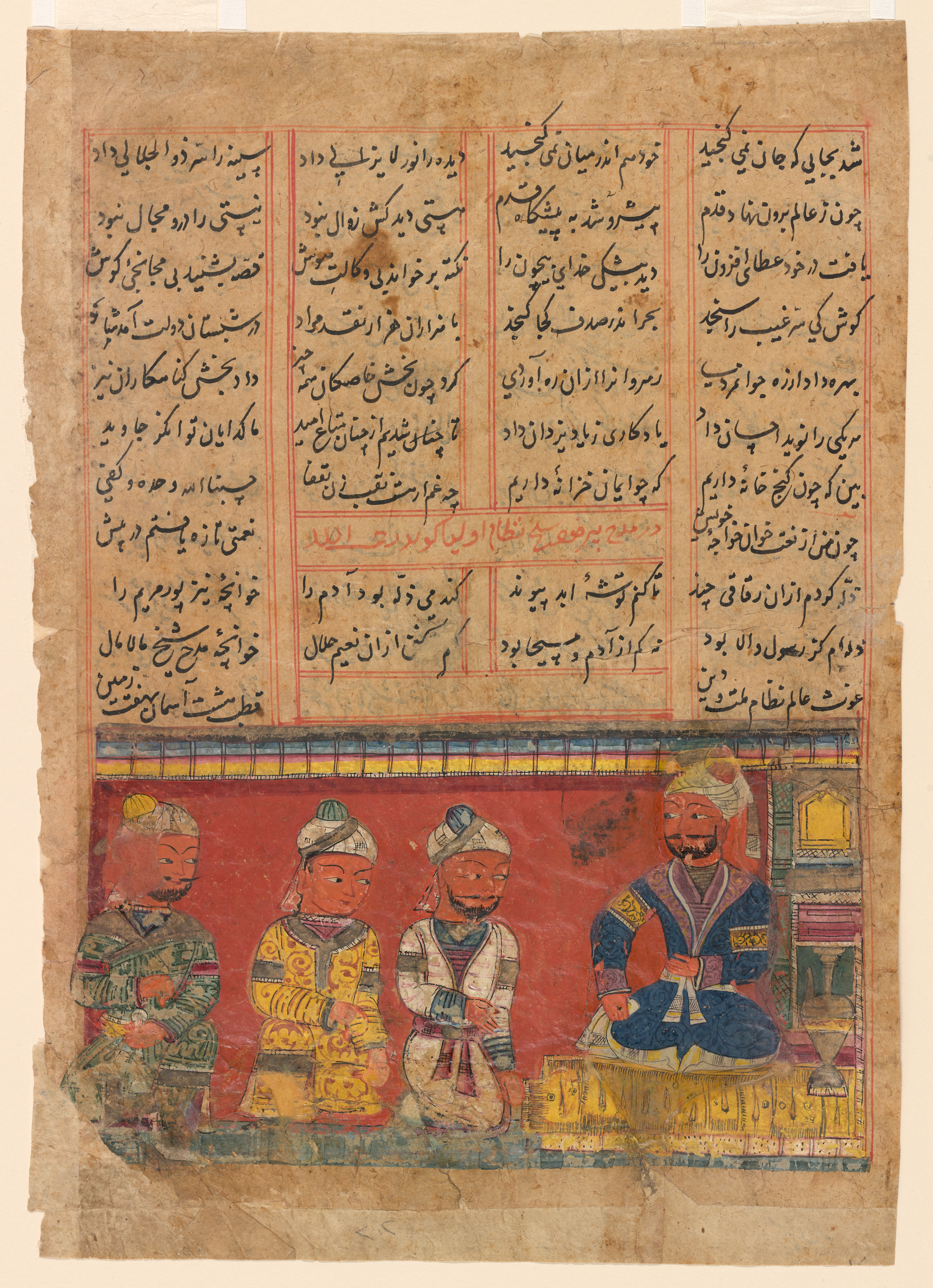
Illustrated folio from a 'Khamsa' (quintet) by Amir Khusrau depicting Sufi saint Nizamuddin Auliya with three attendants, ca.1450 or earlier

He had more than 600 khalifas (a khalifa is a disciple who is given the authority to take his own disciples and thus propagate the spiritual lineage) who continued his lineage all over the world. Some of his most famous disciples are:

- Nasiruddin Chiragh Dehlavi: He was the spiritual successor of Nizamuddin Auliya. He is considered fifth amongst the big five of the Chisti order in India (the others being Moinuddin Chishti, Qutbuddin Bakhtiar Kaki, Fariduddin Ganjshakar, Nizamuddin Auliya). His shrine is in Chirag Dilli, New Delhi, India.
- Amir Khusrow: He was the most loved disciple of his master. He was so close to his master that once Nizāmuddīn Auliyā' said, "If the sharī'ah allowed me I would have liked him to be buried with me in the same grave." It is said that he also said once that whoever comes to visit his grave must visit the grave of Amīr Khusro first and then his. He died within a few months of his master's death. He was buried at the feet of his master. His shrine is in Nizāmuddīn Dargāh, New Delhi.
- Qazi Qawam-Udeen Siddiqui: He was given the title Zubtadul Awliya and was a disciple of his master. He along with his father-in-law Qazi Sultan Zulqarni build Rohtak fort. His descendants are named Qawami Siddiquis and now number in thousands, all have migrated to Pakistan and can be found in Mirpur AK, Islamabad, Karachi, Lahore and Multan.
- Akhi Siraj Aainae Hind: He was given the title of Āainae-Hind (Mirror of India) by Nizāmuddīn Auliyā' and lived with him for a long time. He was amongst the earliest disciples of Nizāmuddīn Auliyā', who sent him to Bengal. His shrine is at Pirana Pir Dargah, Malda City, Malda, West Bengal.
- Burhanuddin Gharib: He is also amongst the earliest disciples of Nizamuddin Auliya and lived with the master until his death. After the death of Nizamuddin Auliya, he went to the Deccan, and the place where he lived became famous thereby. His shrine is in Khuldabad in Maharashtra.
- Hasan Sijzi: Author the spiritual manual Fawaid ul Fuad, a famous compilation of the discourses of Nizamuddin Awliya

== Descendants ==
Nizamuddin Auliya had one brother named Jamaluddin. He told him, "your descendants will be my descendants". Jamaluddin had one son named Ibrahim. He was nurtured by Nizamuddin Auliya after Jamaluddin's death. Nizamuddin Auliya sent his nephew to Bengal in Eastern India along with one of his disciples (khalifa) Akhi Siraj Aainae Hind, known as Aaina-e-Hind. Alaul Haq Pandavi (the master (Pir) of Ashraf Jahangir Semnani) became his disciple and khalifa. Ala-ul-Haq Pandwi married his sister-in-law (sister of Syed Badruddin Badr-e-Alam Zahidi) to Ibrahim. They had one son, Fariduddin Tavaela Bukhsh, who became a well known Chisti Sufi of Bihar. He was married to the daughter of Alaul Haq Pandavi. He became the khalifa of Noor Qutb-e-Aalam Padwi (the eldest son and spiritual successor of Alaul Haq Pandavi). His shrine is in Chandpura, Bihar Sharif, Bihar. Many of his descendants are well known Sufis, namely Moinuddin Sani, Naseeruddin Sani, Sultan Chisti Nizami, Bahauddin Chisti Nizami, Deewan Syed Shah Abdul Wahab (his shrine is in Choti Takiya, Biharsharif), Sultan Sani, Amjad Hussain Chisti Nizami, among others. He spread Chisti Nizami order all over Northern India. Ijaza of his Silsila (order) is present in all the existing khanqahs of Bihar. His descendants still reside in Bihar Sharif and can be found in many parts of the world. The current Sajjada Nasheen of Chillah of Usman Harooni is his direct descendant. Fariduddin Tavaela Bukhsh commemorated (originated) the Urs of Usman Harooni at his chillah in Belchi, Bihar Sharif (First Sajjada Nasheen).

Nizamuddin Aulia also had one sister named Bibi Ruqayya who is buried next to Bibi Zulekha, the mother of Khwaja Nizamuddin Aulia in Adhchini village in Delhi. Nizamuddin Auliya did not marry. He brought his Pir/Shaikh's grandson named Khwaja Muhammad Imam, who was the son of Bibi Fatima (daughter of Baba Farid and Badruddin is'haq) as mentioned in Seyrul Aulia book, Nizami bansari, The life and time of Khwaja Nizamuddin Aulia by Khaliq Ahmed Nizami. Still the descendants of Khwaja Muhammad Imam are the caretakers of dargah sharif.

== The Chisti Nizami order ==
Nizamuddin Auliya was the founder of the Chisti Nizami order. He had hundreds of disciples (khalifa) who had Ijaza (khilafat) from him to spread the order. Many of the Sufis of the Chisti Nizami order are recognised as great Sufis; the following is a list of notable Sufis of the Chisti Nizami order, which includes his descendants as well as his disciples and their subsequent disciples:

Nasiruddin Mahmud Chiragh Dehlavi, Amir Khusro, Khwaja Banda Nawaz Gesudaraz Muhammad al-Hussaini, Alaul Haq Pandavi and Nur Qutb Alam, Pandua, West Bengal; Ashraf Jahangir Semnani, Kichaucha, Uttar Pradesh; Hussam ad-Din Manikpuri (Pratapgarh, Uttar Pradesh) Faqruddin Faqr Dehlvi, Mehrauli, New Delhi; Shah Niyaz Ahmad Barelvi, Bareilly, Uttar Pradesh; Shafruddin Ali Ahmed and Fakhruddin Ali Ahmed, Chirag Dilli, New Delhi; Zainuddin Shirazi, Burhanpur, Madhya Pradesh; Muhiuddin Yousuf Yahya Madani Chishti, Medina; Kaleemullah Dehlvi Chishti, Delhi; Nizamuddin Aurangabadi; Nizamuddin Hussain, and Meerza Agha Mohammad; Muhammad Sulman Taunswi, Pakistan, Mohammad Meera Hussaini, Hesamuddin Mankpuri, Mian Shah Mohammad Shah, Hoshiarpur, Punjab, India, Mian Ali Mohammad Khan, Pakpattan, Pakistan. Khuwaja Noman Nayyir Kulachvi (Khalifa e Majaz) Kulachi, Pakistan, Khalifa Omer Tarin Chishti-Nizami Ishq Nuri, Qalandarabad, Pakistan.

=== Branches ===
The Chisti order branched out with Nizamuddin Auliya to form the Chisti Nizami order. A parallel branch which started with Alauddin Sabir Kaliyari, another disciple of Baba Farid, was the Chisti Sabiri branch. People started adding Nizami gracefully after their name. He spiritually made many great Sufis amongst his students, descendants and the Sufis of the Nizami order.

The branches of the Chisti Nizami order are as follows:

==== Naseeria ====
His disciple Nasiruddin Muhammad Chirag-e-Dehli started the Nizamia Naseeria branch.

==== Hussainia ====
The Hussainia branch is named for Syed Muhammad Kamaluddin Hussaini Gisudaraz Bandanawaz. He was the most famous and loved disciple of Nasiruddin Muhammad Chirag-e-Dehli. The khanqah he established in Gulbarga, Karnataka, is still in existence.

Fakhri The "Fakhri" branch is named for Muhib Un Nabi Maulana Fakhr Ud Din Fakhr E Jahan Dehlvi, peer o murshid of Shah Niyaz Be Niyaz.

==== Niyazi ====
Shah Niyaz Ahmad Barelvi, in the 19th century started the Niyazi branch.

==== Serajia ====
The Nizamia Serajia branch was started by Serajuddin Aqi Seraj. This branch is also known as Chistia Serajia.

==== Ashrafia ====
The Chistia Ashrafia branch was started by Ashraf Jahangir Semnani. He established a khanqah, still in existence at Kichaucha sharif, Uttar Pradesh, India.

==== Faridia ====
The Chistia Serajia Faridia order was started by Fariduddin Tavaelabukhsh, a descendant of Nizamuddin Auliya and a Sufi of the Serajia branch of the Chisti order. This branch is also known as Nizamia Serajia Faridia.

=== Ishq-Nuri ===
The Ishq Nuri order, branch of the main Chishti- Nizami, was founded by Shaikh Khwaja Khalid Mahmood Chishti sahib, in Lahore, Pakistan, in the 1960s. It is the most contemporary expression of this traditional Sufi lineage. It is mostly found in India, Pakistan and Bangladesh, although now some followers are also to be found in the West.

Lutfia Silsila Chishtia-Nizamia-Lutfia was continued by Moulana Lutfullah Shah Dankouri. The disciples of this silsila are found in Pakistan, India, England, Canada and USA.

== During the short reign of Qutbu'd-Din Mubarak Shah ==
During the last years of Alauddin Khalji's life, the intrigues of Malik Kafur deprived Khizr Khan of succeeding legitimately to the throne. Malik Kafur had Khizr Khan blinded and Qutbuddin Mubarak Shah (1316–20), another claimant to the throne, narrowly escaped death. When Mubarak Shah ascended the throne he had Khizr Khan and the latter's brothers executed. Shaikh Nizamu'd-Din took no interest in political upheavals but could not escape the brunt of Sultan Mubarak Shah's fury for having made Khizr Khan his disciple. Speaking disparagingly of the Shaikh he began to hatch schemes against him. He prohibited his nobles from visiting Ghiyaspur. Mubarak Shah also constructed a mosque, the Masjid-i Miri, Where all the Sufis and 'ulama' were ordered to perform their prayers. The Shaikh refused to comply with the Sultan's orders, remonstrating that the mosque in his neighborhood had a greater claim on him.

On the first day of each month, the entire religious community of Delhi, gathered at the palace to offer congratulations prayer to the Sultan. The Shaikh further angered the Sultan by sending a servant as his delegate. The Sultan threatened the Shaikh with serious consequences if he personally failed to pay homage. Refusing to heed the threat, the Shaikh quietly prayed at his mother's tomb and returned to his jama'at-khana. As the last day of the month approached, the capital was filled with anxiety, while the Shaikh himself remained calm. But the first day of the next month did not come for the Sultan. He was assassinated on the first night of Jumada II, 720/8 July 1320 by his favorite and protege, Khusraw Khan Barwar, who was later overthrown by Ghazi Malik who later came to be known as Ghiyasuddin Tughluq.

== Urs ==
The Urs-e-Nizamuddin Aulia is celebrated at the Nizamuddin Dargah on the 17th-18th of Rabi II (Rabi-ul-Aaqir), and that of Amir Khusro on the 18th of Shawwal.

== In popular culture ==
Aulea-E-Islam, a 1979 Indian Muslim social film by A. Shamsheer pays tribute to various Islamic saints including Nizamuddin Auliya, featuring a song "Nizamuddin Aulia" sung by Jani Babu Qawwal and written by Viqar Nagri.

Arziyan, a qawwali in the film Delhi 6 (2009) composed by A. R. Rahman, is dedicated to Nizamuddin Auliya. Kun Faya Kun a song in the film Rockstar (2011) is also dedicated to him, and was shot at the dargah.

== See also ==
- Hazrat Nizamuddin Dargah
- Mir Sayyid Ali Hamadani
- Ali Hujwiri
- Moinuddin Chishti
- Aaj Rang Hai
- Akhi Siraj Aainae Hind
- Alaul Haq Pandavi
- Ashraf Jahangir Semnani
