= Tughlakabad (village) =

- Village
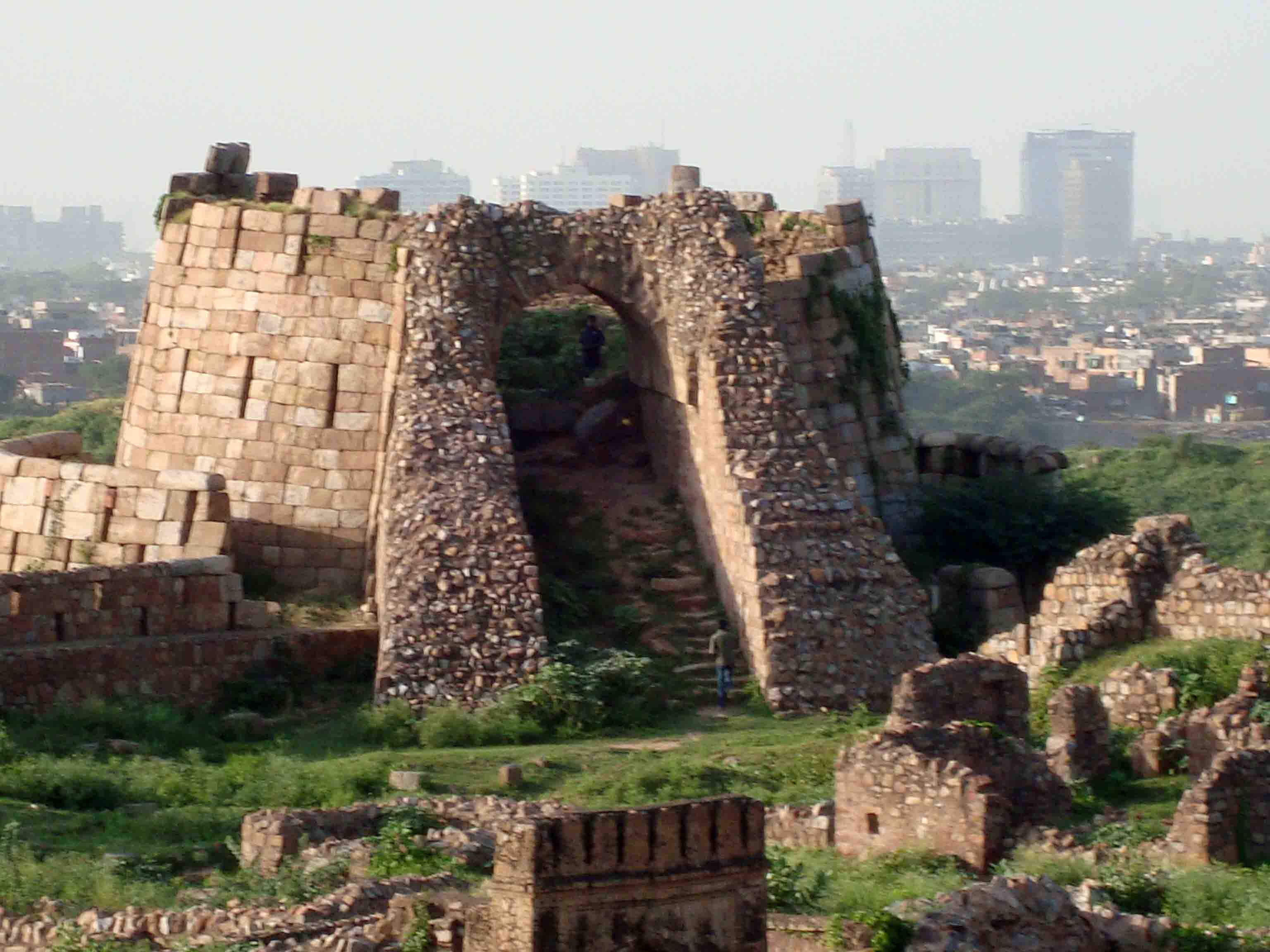

- Location in Delhi, India
- Coordinates: 28°30′34″N 77°16′20″E
- Country: India
- State: Delhi
- District: South East Delhi
- Named for: Ghiyas-ud-din Tughlaq

Population
  - Total: 1 lakh Approx.

Languages
  - Official: Hindi, English
- Time zone: UTC+5:30 (IST)
- PIN: 110044
- Lok Sabha constituency: South Delhi Lok Sabha
- Vidhan Sabha: Tughlakabad Assembly
- Municipal Corporation Ward: Ward No. 93S

Tughlakabad village is one of the oldest urban villages in the South East District of New Delhi. The village is named after Ghiyas-ud-din Tughlaq and is located in the shadows of the 700-year-old ruins of Tughlaqabad Fort.

== History ==
During the construction of Tughlaqabad Fort in 1321, Ghiyasuddin Tughlaq encountered a conflict with the revered Sufi saint Hazrat Nizamuddin Auliya. While the ruler sought to mobilise all labourers for his fort's construction, many were also working on a stepwell (baoli) in nighttime for Nizamuddin at his residence. In an effort to compel the workers to abandon the baoli project, Tughlaq banned the sale of kerosene, aiming to prevent them from lighting lamps at night.

Angered by the ruler's actions, Nizamuddin Auliya pronounced a curse: "Ya rahe ujjar, ya base Gujjar," meaning "Either it remains a ruin or may the nomadic and peasant Gujjars live there."

During a military campaign in Bengal, Tughlaq learned that laborers at his newly constructed Fort were defying his orders by working on the (baoli). He vowed to punish the saint upon his return to Delhi. In response, Nizamuddin Auliya remarked, "Hunuz Dilli dur ast," meaning "Delhi is still far off," suggesting that the Sultan's plans would be thwarted.

As the curse began to take effect, Tughlaq and his younger son met a tragic fate on their journey back. A pavilion, erected to celebrate the Sultan's military success, collapsed, resulting in their deaths. This incident underscored the belief that Nizamuddin's curse had manifested, leading to the eventual abandonment of Tughlaqabad Fort shortly after its completion.

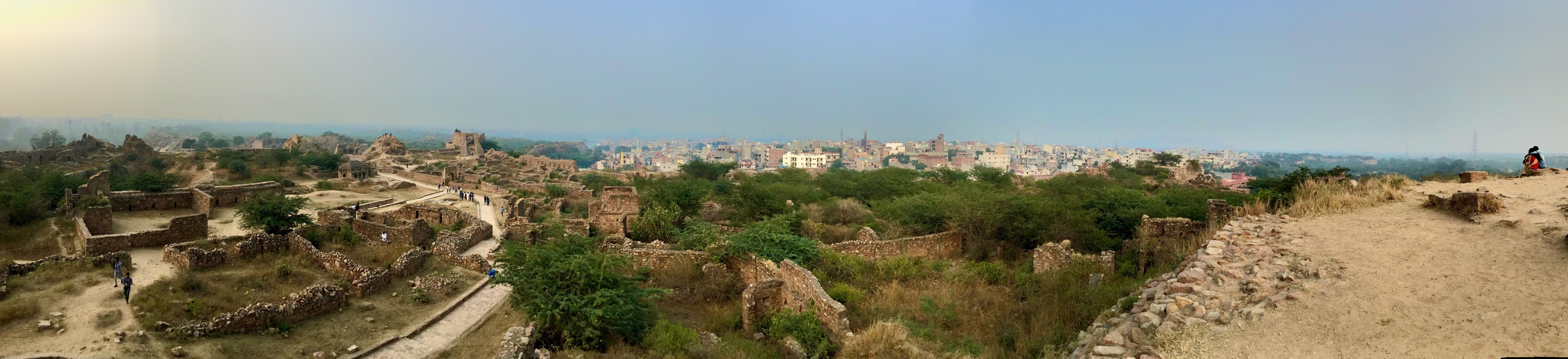
Panoramic view of the ruins of Tughlakabad Fort

== Demographics ==
Tughlakabad is inhabited by the kangar gotra, Gurjar community as they are the first settled here and later Khumhar community as khowal's is also found in Tughlakabad. There are Mohallas named kangar mohalla, Bhangar Mohalla, Churiya Mohalla, Kuan Mohalla, Jalam Mohalla, Bazar Mohalla, NauGhara Mohalla, Kumhar Mohalla and Mohalla of the Kangar surname of the Gurjar Community.

During the partition of India, some Sikh families also migrated to Tughlakabad from Pakistan, Their Mohalla is known as Sardar Mohalla.

== Administration and politics ==
- Tughlakabad Village Comes under South Delhi (Lok Sabha constituency)
- in assembly, Tughlakabad Village Comes under Tughlakabad (Delhi Assembly constituency) of Delhi Legislative Assembly
- Municipal Corporation of Delhi have jurisdiction over Tughlaqabad Village
- Tughlaqabad Village Comes under South East District and its subdivision is Kalkaji

== Landmarks ==
- Ravidas Temple
- Tughlaqabad Fort

== Notable people ==
- Ramvir Bidhuri, Leader of Opposition in Delhi Assembly, Badarpur MLA
- Rajendra Bidhuri, MLA from Begun, Rajasthan

== See also ==
- Ghiyaspur
- Mehrauli
- Adhchini
