= Nasiruddin Chiragh Dehlavi =

Sufi saint and poet (1274–1356)

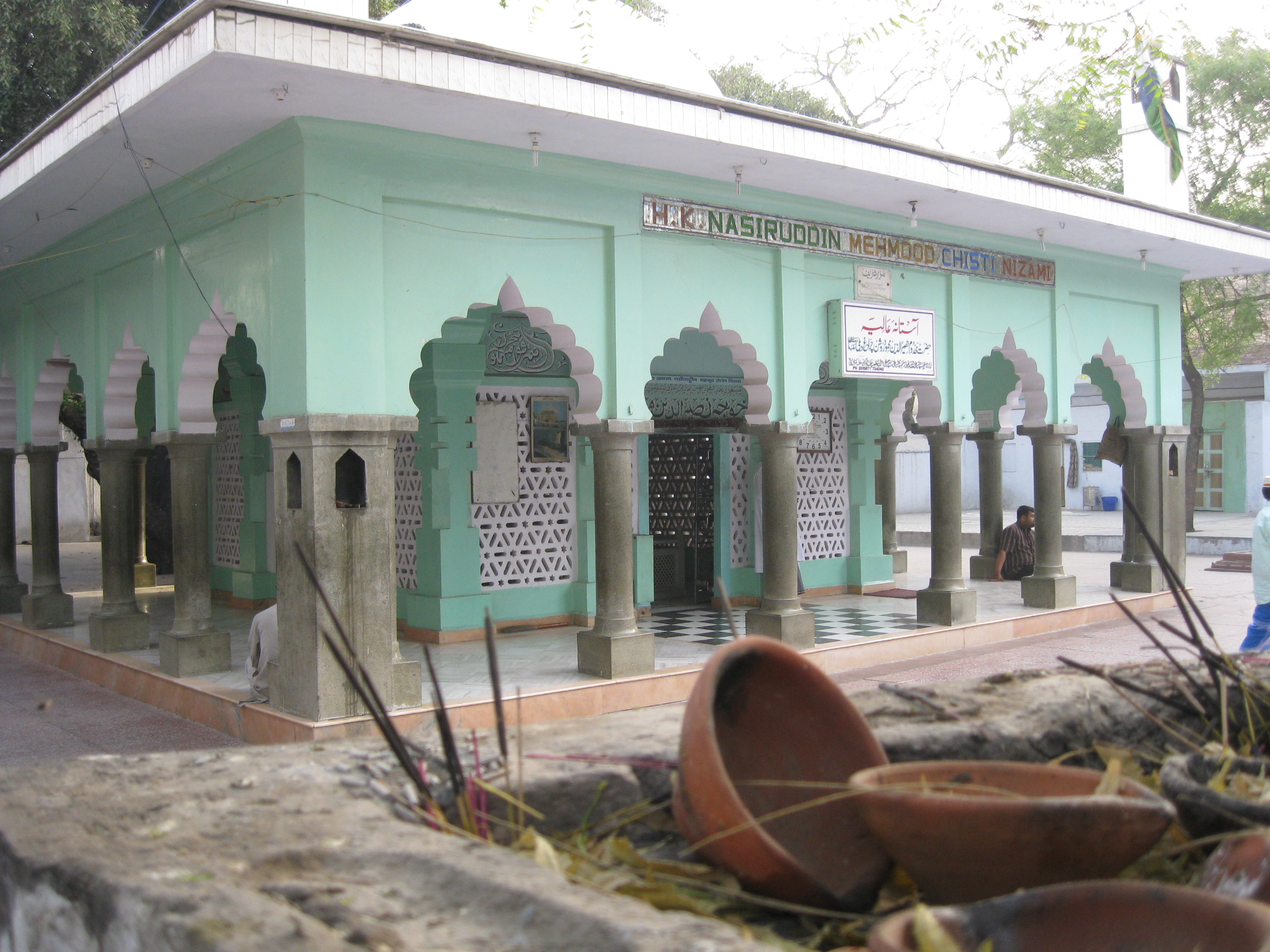
- Title: چراغِ دہلی Chiragh-e-Dehli

Personal life
- Born: 1274 Ayodhya, Delhi Sultanate
- Died: 1356 Dehli, Delhi Sultanate
- Other name: Chiragh e Dehli

Religious life
- Religion: Sunni Islam
- Tariqa: Chisti Nizami order

Senior posting
- Based in: Delhi
- Period in office: Early 14th century
- Predecessor: Hazrat Nizamuddin Auliya
- Students: Khwaja Banda Nawaz Gesudaraz, Khwaja Sheikh Kaleemullah Jahanabadi, Kamaluddin Chishti, Khwaja Moinuddin Khurd Bin Hisamuddin Jigar Sokhta

Nasir-ud-Din Mahmud "Roshan Chirag-e-Dehli" (Urdu نصیرالدین چراغ دہلوی ) (c. 1274–1337) was a 14th-century mystic-poet and a Sufi saint of the Chishti Order. He was a disciple and successor of Hazrat Nizamuddin Auliya. He is considered as the last important Sufi of the Chishti Order from Delhi.

His title "Roshan Chirag-e-Delhi", in Persian, means "Illuminated Lamp of Delhi".

== Biography ==
Syed Nasiruddin Mahmud Chiragh Dehlavi (or Chiragh-e-Delhi) was born as Nasiruddin Mahmud Al Hasani around 1274, at Ayodhya, Uttar Pradesh. Dehlavi's father, Yahya Al Hasani, who traded in Pashmina, and his grandfather, Shaikh Yahya Abdul Latif Al Hasani, first migrated from Khorasan, northeastern Iran, to Lahore, and thereafter settled in Ayodhya, in Awadh. His father died when he was nine and he received education from Abdul Karim Sherwani and then from Iftikhar Uddin Gilani.

At the age forty, he left Ayodhya for Delhi, where he became the disciple of Nizamuddin Auliya. Dehlavi stayed there for the rest of his life as his disciple, and after his death, became his successor. In time, he also became a known poet in Persian language.

He died in 17 Ramzan 757 Hijri or 1357 CE, at the age of 82 or 83, and is buried in a part of South Delhi, India which is known as "Chirag Delhi" after him.

== Disciples ==
One of his disciples was Bande Nawaz Gezu Daraz, who later moved to Daulatabad around 1400, owing to the attack of Timur on Delhi. Invited by Bahamani King, Firuz Shah Bahamani, he then moved to Gulbarga, Karnataka. He stayed there for the following 22 years, spreading the Chishti Order until his death in November 1422.

Bande Nawaz's mausoleum is in Gulbarga, as a symbol of multi-religious unity. Another prominent discipline was Makhdoom Jahanan jahangasht of uch Sharif (grandson of saiyyed Jalaluddin shurkhposh Bukhari) makhdoom jahanian jahangasht did 36 Haj, he was peer of 80 makhdooms including Ashraf Jahangir simnani of kichaucha shariff and Syed sadruddin Raju Qattal, and was also the peer of king Firoz Shah Tuglaq, sultan of Gujrat Zafar Shah, ruler of Ludhiana Sheikh Chachu. Khwaja Moinuddin Khurd Bin Khwaja Hisamuddin Jigar Sokhta Bin Khwaja Fakhruddin Bin Khwaja Moinuddin Hasan Chishty Rehmatullah Alaih was also disciple and Khalifa.

During his stay in Delhi, Dehlavi continued to visit Ayodhya often, where he made a number of disciples, notably, Shaikh Zainuddin Ali Awadhi was his nephew, Shaikh Fatehullah Awadhi and Allama Kamaluddin Awadhi. Kamaluddin Allama was his nephew.

== Dargah ==
After his death, his tomb was built by Firuz Shah Tughluq (r. 1351–1388), the Sultan of Delhi in 1358, and later two gateways were added on either side of mausoleum. One of noted addition was a mosque built by a later Mughal emperor, Farrukhsiyar, in the early 18th century, and popular among both Muslims and non-Muslims. A humble tomb, allegedly the Tomb of Bahlol Lodi, the grave of the founder of the Lodi dynasty (r. 1451–1489), lies close to the shrine, in the present day locality of ‘Chirag Delhi’ that grew around the tomb since 1800, and still goes by his name, it is very close to the locality of Greater Kailash, in South Delhi.

== Legacy ==
Nasiruddin Chiragh Dehalvi, unlike his spiritual master Nizamuddin Auliya, did not listen to sema, which was considered un-Islamic by a section of the Muslim intelligentsia in that period. He did not however pass any specific judgement against it. This is the reason why even today, qawwali is not performed near his shrine in Delhi. Nasiruddin's descendants are to be found far and wide as a lot of them moved down South to Hyderabad. The dargah of Badi Bua or Badi Bibi, who said be the elder sister of Nasiruddin Mahmud Chiragh Dehlavi, still exists in city of Ayodhya.

== Khanzada Jadubansi Rajputs, their acceptance of Islam ==
Khanzadah, the Persian form of the Rajputana word Rajput, is the title of the representatives of the ancient Jadubansi royal Rajput family, descendants of Krishna and therefore of Lunar Dynasty.

Jadon (also spelled Jadaun) Rajput Raja Lakhan Pala, the progenitor of the family of the Khanzadahs, was the grandson of Raja Adhan Pala (who was 4th in descent from Raja Tahan Pala). Tahan Pala, who founded Tahangarh, was the eldest son of Raja Bijai Pala (founder of Bijai Garh), who himself was 88th in descent from Lord Krishna. Hence, Jadon Raja Lakhan Pala, Mewatpatti (title means, Lord of Mewat) was 94th in descent from Lord Krishna.

=== Acceptance of Islam ===
The family records of Khanzadas of Mewat states that during one of the hunting expedition Kunwar Sambhar Pal and Kunwar Sopar Pal, the sons of Jadon Raja Lakhan Pal, met with Sufi saint Nasiruddin Mahmud, Roshan Chiragh-i Dehli. The acceptance of Islam by Khanzadahs have been a 'enlightenment of heart' come about from their association with the Sufi saints.

== See also ==
- Khanzada
- Ata Hussain Fani Chishti
- Chishti
- Khwaja Abdullah Chishti
- Khwaja Maudood Chishti
- Khwaja Wali Kirani
- Moinuddin Chishti
- Persian inscriptions on Indian monuments
