= Adhchini =

Village in Delhi, India

- Village and colony
- Adchini
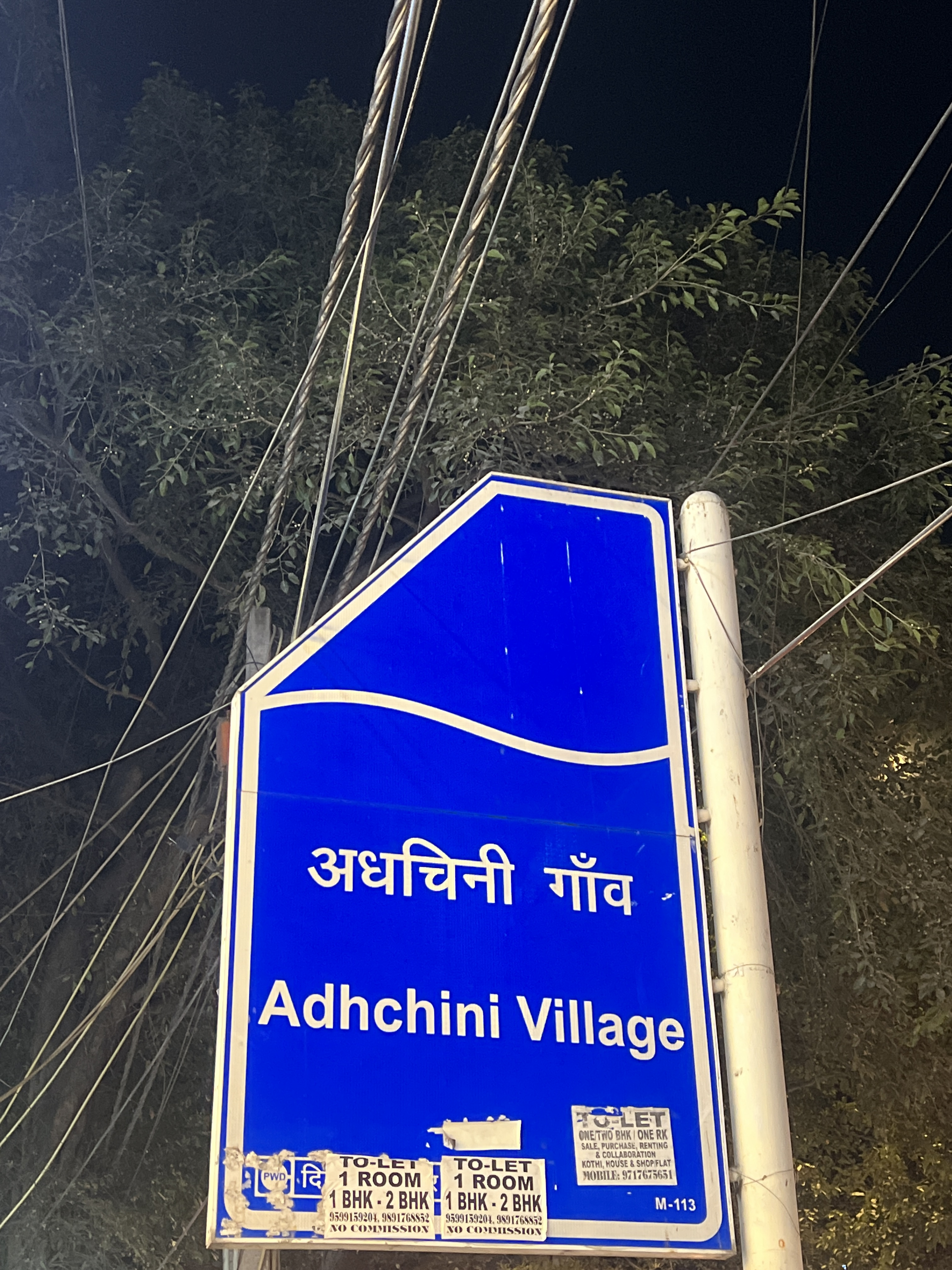
- Interactive map of Adhchini
- Location within Delhi
- Country: India
- State: Delhi
- District: South Delhi

Government
  - Type: State government
  - Body: Delhi Legislative Assembly

Population (2020)
  - Total: 18,269

Languages
  - Official: Hindi, English
- Time zone: UTC+5:30 (IST)
- PIN: 110017
- Civic body: Municipal Corporation of Delhi

Adhchini (also spelled as Adchini) is a village and residential locality situated at Sri Aurobindo Marg, near Mehrauli area of South Delhi district in Delhi, India. Its postal code is 110017.

The locality is known for the 13th-century Sufi shrine Dargah Mai Sahiba and the automobile showrooms in the market.

== Educational institutes ==
- Indian Institutes of Technology
- National Council of Educational Research and Training
- The Mother's International School
