= Nalchha, Dhar =

Nalchha Nalcha
- Town
- Location in Madhya Pradesh, India
- Coordinates: 22.41°N 75.41°E
- Country: India
- State: Madhya Pradesh
- District: Dhar

Government
  - Type: Sarpanch
  - Body: Gram panchayat

Languages
  - Official: Hindi
- Time zone: UTC+5:30 (IST)
- PIN: 454001
- Telephone code: 07292
- Vehicle registration: MP-11
- Spoken Languages: Hindi

Nalchha also spelled as Nalcha is a small town in Dhar district in the state of Madhya Pradesh, India. It is situated 25 km away from Dhar, which is both district & sub-district headquarter of Nalchha village. The total geographical area of village is 1598.8 hectares.

== Assembly ==
As per 2019 stats, Nalchha villages comes under Dharampuri assembly.

== Parliamentary constituency ==
Nalchha Village comes under Dhar parliamentary constituency.

== Population ==
As per Population Census 2011, the Nalchha village has population of 6186 of which 3163 are males while 3023 are females.

== Geography ==
Nalchha is located at 22.41°N 75.41°E.

== Nearest Stations ==
=== Airport ===
Devi Ahilya Bai Holkar Airport, Indore 70 km From Nalcha village.

=== Railway Station ===
Indore Junction railway station, Indore.

=== Bus Stand ===
The nearest bus stand from Nalcha is Bus Stand, nalchha.
