= Ghiyaspur =

Ancient village in Delhi

Coordinates: 28°35′28″N 77°14′32″E

Ghiyaspur Nizamuddin Basti
- Village
- Interactive map of Ghiyaspur
- Named for: Ghiyasuddin Balban

Government
  - Type: Sultanate
  - Body: Sultan of Delhi

Ghiyaspur, an ancient village located in what is now known as Nizamuddin Basti in Delhi, India, has a rich historical significance. The area was named after Ghiyasuddin Balban, the ninth Sultan of Delhi Sultanate. Ghiyaspur served as an important settlement during the medieval period, particularly due to its association with the revered Sufi saint, Hazrat Nizamuddin Auliya.

== History ==
In the 13th century, Nizamuddin Auliya settled in Ghiyaspur, transforming the village into a spiritual hub. His teachings emphasized love, humanity, and the importance of community, attracting followers from diverse backgrounds. The village gradually evolved into a center for Sufi practices and a place of pilgrimage, particularly after the saint's death in 1325.

Over time, Ghiyaspur was renamed Nizamuddin Basti, reflecting its deep connection to the saint. The area is now home to the Hazrat Nizamuddin Dargah, which is a mausoleum dedicated to Hazrat Nizamuddin Auliya. This site continues to draw thousands of devotees and visitors, contributing to the vibrant cultural and spiritual life of the community.

== Legacy ==
The legacy of Ghiyaspur, intertwined with the teachings of Nizamuddin Auliya, remains a significant aspect of Delhi's historical and cultural landscape.

It is considered as one of the oldest human settlements in Delhi and received two recognitions from UNESCO:

- Award of excellence 2021 for cultural heritage conservation.
- Recognition for sustainable development.
