= Old Pillanji Village =

Old Pilanji Village
- Neighbourhood
- Location in Delhi, India
- Coordinates: 28.579°N 77.20076°E
- Country: India
- State: Delhi
- District: New Delhi

Population
  - Total: ~30,000

Languages
  - Official: Hindi, English
- Time zone: UTC+5:30 (IST)
- PIN: 110023
- Lok Sabha constituency: New Delhi Lok Sabha constituency
- Vidhan Sabha constituency: New Delhi
- Civic agency: NDMC

Old Pilanji Village is a neighbourhood located within New Delhi, India. The village is approximately 600 years old. The village was reorganized in 1911 by Great Britain when Delhi was made the seat of Governance.
