= Bande Nawaz =

14th and 15th-century Indian Sufi saint

Khwaja Banda Nawaz Gesudaraz
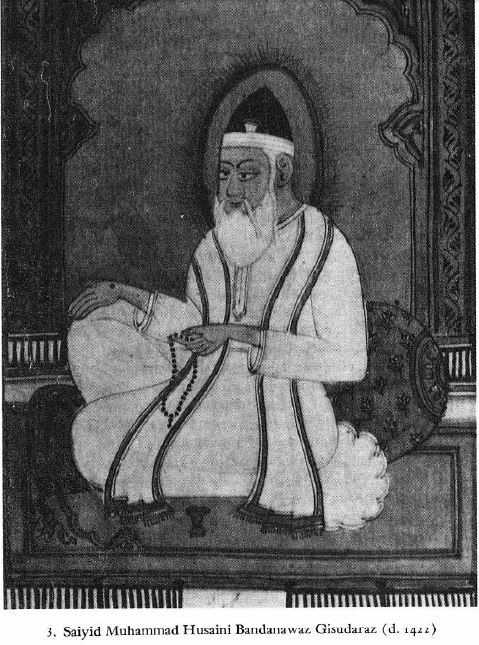
- Portrait of Bande Nawaz

Personal life
- Born: Syed Muhammad al-Hussaini; 30 July 1321 Delhi, Delhi Sultanate
- Died: 1 November 1422 (aged 101) Kalaburagi Fort, Gulbarga, Bahmani Sultanate

Religious life
- Religion: Islam
- Sect: Sufi Hanafi, Chishti Order
- Creed: Maturidi

Muslim leader
- Influenced by: Nasiruddin Chiragh Dehlavi
- Influenced: Sufism

Syed Muhammad ibn Yousuf al-Hussaini (30 July 1321 − 1 November 1422), commonly known as Bande Nawaz or Gisu Daraz, was a Hanafi Maturidi scholar and Sufi saint of the Chishti Order, from India.

Gisu Daraz was a disciple and then successor of Sufi saint Nasiruddin Chiragh Dehlavi. When he moved to Daulatabad around 1400, owing to the attack of Timur on Delhi, he took the Chishti Order to South India. He finally settled down in Gulbarga, at the invitation of Bahmani Sultan, Taj ud-Din Firuz Shah.

== Life ==
Bande Nawaz was born in Delhi in 1321 to a Sayyid family originally from Herat. At the age of seven, he and his family arrived in Daulatabad in the Deccan after Delhi sultan Muhammad bin Tughlaq had declared the city to be the co-capital and called upon Muslims in Delhi to migrate there.

In 735 AH (1334/1335 CE), he returned to Delhi without his father, who had died in Daulatabad, and soon began training under Nasiruddin Chiragh Dehlavi, the preeminent sheikh of the Chishti Order in the city. During this time, he attained his sobriquet Gisu Daraz. The sheikh was aware of his imminent death, and believing in Bande Nawaz's worthiness and sanctity, passed down his prayer rug to him, making him his successor. In Delhi, Bande Nawaz rose to public prominence, assisting the population with his specialised knowledge and abilities.

=== Migration to the Deccan ===
Bande Nawaz fled Delhi on 17 December 1398, at the age of 77, due to the threat of the advancing forces of Timur, who had recently launched an invasion of the Delhi Sultanate and was quickly approaching the city. He first travelled to Gwalior, and ventured through modern-day Madhya Pradesh into Gujarat, where he arrived at Khambhat in the summer of 1399. From Baroda, he embarked in hope of returning to Daulatabad to pay homage to his father's tomb. At the invitation of Taj ud-Din Firuz Shah, sultan of the Bahmani Kingdom, Bande Nawaz settled in the Bahmani capital Gulbarga in 802 AH (1399/1400 CE).

While in Gulbarga, Bande Nawaz came into conflict with Firuz Shah, and the two's once-amicable relations diminished. The sultan was knowledgeable in the external sciences, and took issue at the sheikh's lack of experience in the matter, which led to a renouncement of support by the sultan. Though the sheikh adhered to the metaphysical doctrine of waḥdat al-shuhūd, which went against scholar Ibn 'Arabi's teaching of waḥdat al-wujūd, the court grew suspicious of the sheikh's application of the scholar's allegedly heretical works, causing further tension. A dispatch sent to investigate Bande Nawaz's teachings himself became enthralled in the sheikh's word and entered adherence to him. In 1407, these quarrels caused the sheikh to involuntarily move his residence and hospice (khanaqah) away from its original location outside the fort's gate, which the sultan asserted was necessary to ensure the safety of the court. To Firuz Shah's outrage, Bande Nawaz endorsed the sultan's brother Ahmad, who had expressed substantial support for and venerated the sheikh, to be the royal successor rather than the sultan's son.

Bande Nawaz continued his work in Gulbarga up until his death in 1422, one month after Firuz Shah had himself died and been succeeded by Ahmad.

== Works ==
Bande Nawaz wrote 195 books in Arabic, Persian and Urdu, a rarity for people of his kind, who previously had not directly written their ideas. He also composed a book on the Prophet of Islam titled Miraj-al Ashiqin for the instruction of the masses in Dakhni, a South Indian branch of the Urdu language. He was the first Sufi to use this vernacular which was elaborated upon by many other Sufi saints of South India in later centuries. He wrote many treatises on the works of Ibn Arabi and Suhrawardi, which made the works of these scholars accessible to Indian scholars and played a major role in influencing later mystical thought. Other books authored are Qaseeda Amali and Adaab-al-Mureedein.

== Urs ==
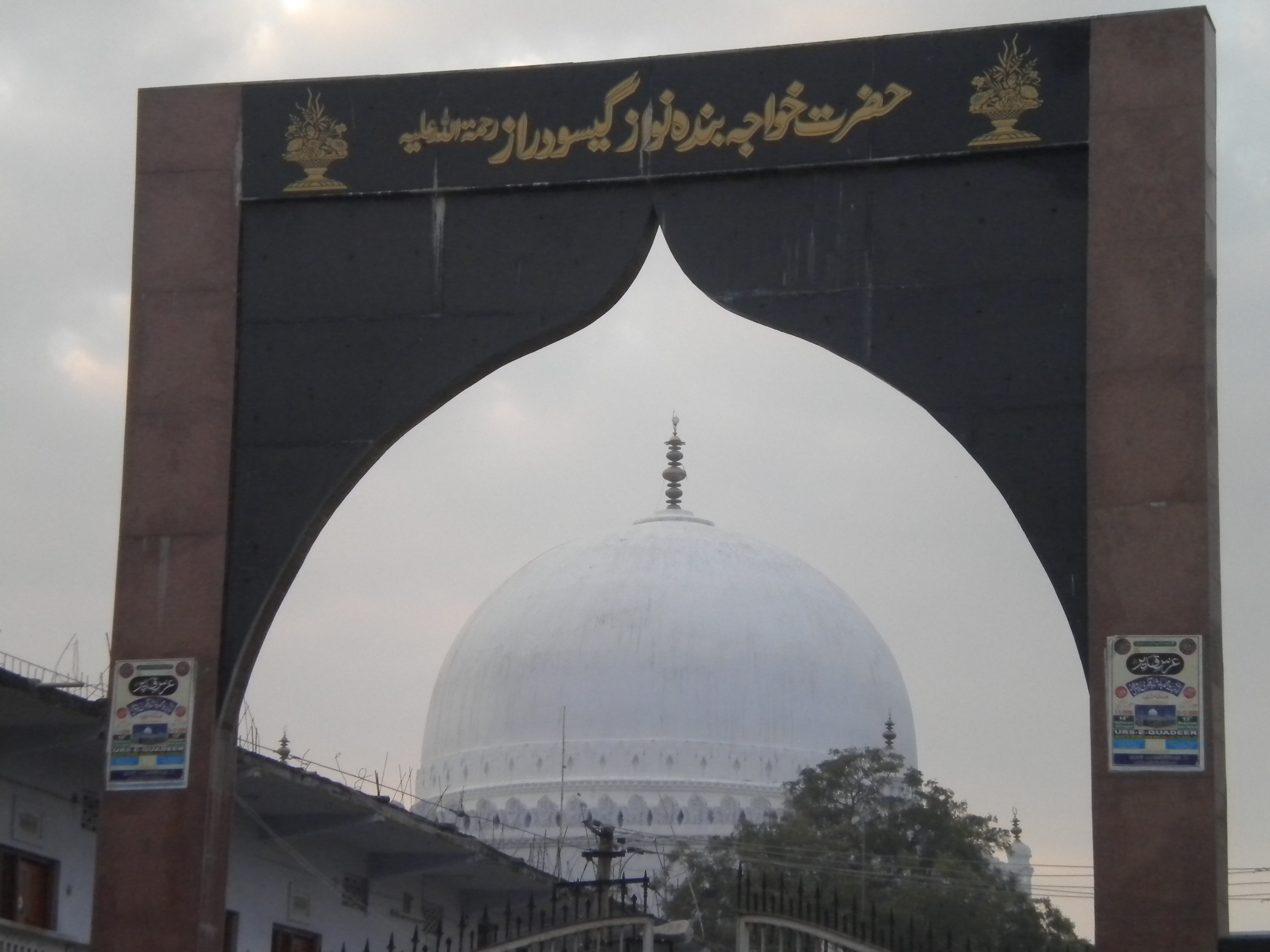
Dargah of Banda Nawaz

His death anniversary (urs) takes place on 15, 16 and 17 Dhu al-Qadah at the Bande Nawaz mausoleum in Gulbarga, built by Ahmad Shah after his accession. Thousands of people from different religions gather to seek blessings.

== In popular culture ==
Indian Muslim social films revolving around the saint and his dargah have been made. These include: Sultan E Deccan: Banda Nawaz (1982) by Malik Anwar, Banda Nawaz (1988) by Saini.

== See also ==
- Sufism in India

== Bibliography ==
- Eaton, Richard M. (2001). "GISU-DARĀZ". In Yarshater, Ehsan (ed.). Encyclopædia Iranica. Vol. XI/1: Giōni–Golšani. London and New York: Routledge & Kegan Paul. pp. 1–3. ISBN 978-0-933273-60-3.
- Eaton, Richard M. (2005). "Gisu Daraz (1321–1422)". A Social History of the Deccan, 1300-1761 : Eight Indian Lives. Cambridge University Press. ISBN 978-0-521-71627-7.
