= Nila Gumbad =

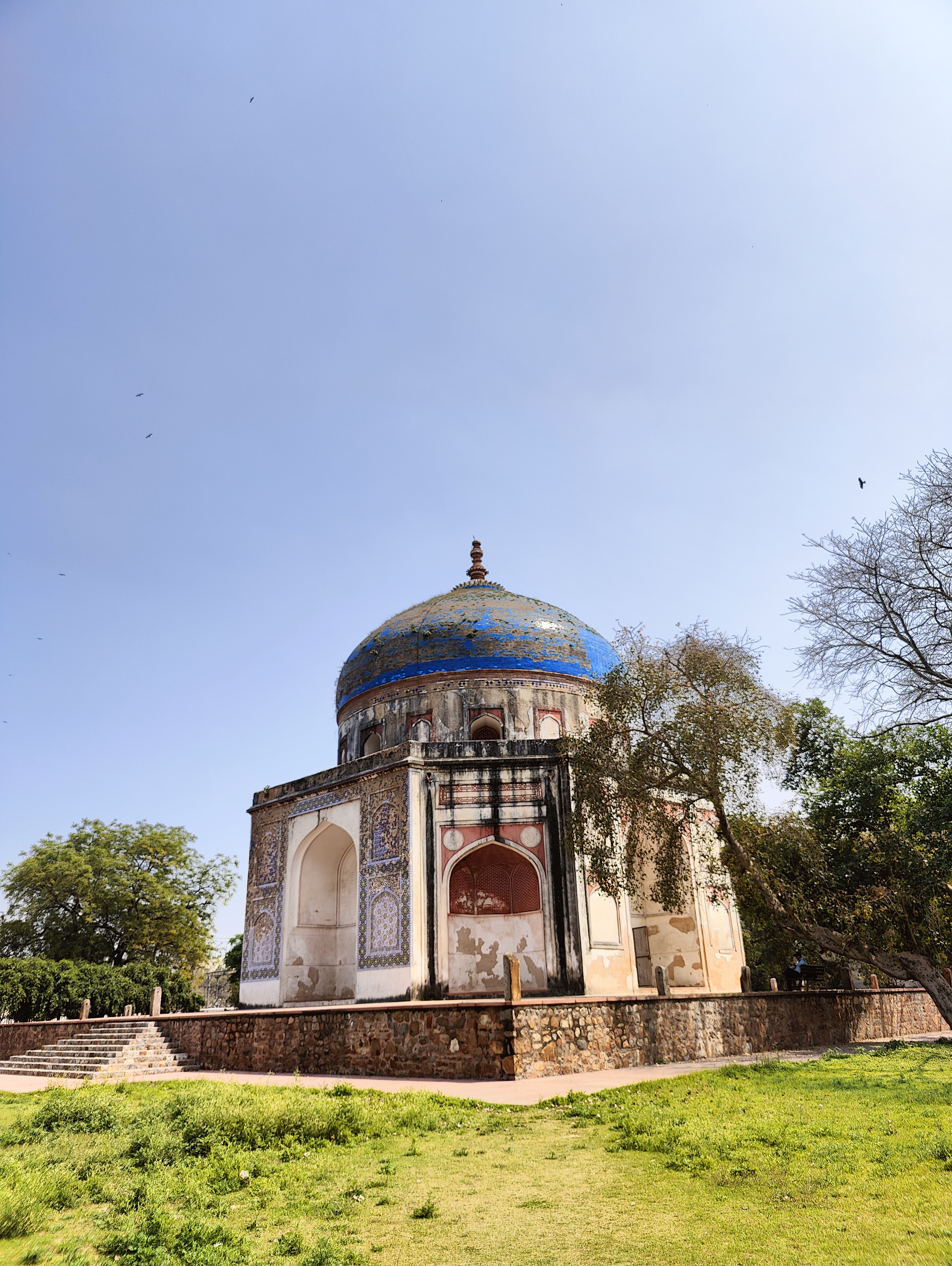
- Nila Gumbad
- Interactive map of Nila Gumbad
- 28.591935°N 77.253141°E
- Location: Humayun's Tomb, Delhi, India

UNESCO World Heritage Site
- Type: Cultural
- Criteria: (ii), (iv)
- Designated: 1993 (17th session)
- Part of: Humayun's Tomb
- Region: India

Nila Gumbad (lit. 'Blue Dome') is a tomb located within the Humayun's Tomb complex at Delhi, India. Historians are unsure about the identity of the person who has been buried. Some claim that it houses the tomb of an attendant of a Mughal noble and was buried during the reign of Jahangir. According to others, the tomb existed much before the Humayun's Tomb was constructed. At the time of construction, it was covered with glazed tiles most of which have been destroyed. This building along with other buildings form the UNESCO World Heritage Site of Humayun's Tomb complex.

== Background ==
In the book Asarus Sanadid, Syed Ahmed Khan writes that this mausoleum houses the tomb of Fahim Khan. Khan was an attendant of Abdul Rahim Khan-I-Khana and died in 1626, during the reign of the Mughal emperor Jahangir. S.A.A. Naqvi of the Archaeological Survey of India opines that this building was built even before the Humayun's Tomb. His conjecture is based on the fact that the enclosure wall of the Humayun's Tomb contains a gateway to this building. Also, the enclosure wall contains recessed arches, which are absent in the Nila Gumbad.

The mausoleum is located 50 yards (46 m) away from the eastern wall of the enclosure of the Humayun's Tomb. This building along with other buildings form the UNESCO World Heritage Site of Humayun's Tomb complex. Since 2019, the Nila gumbad has been made accessible and people can visit it using the same ticket for the Humayuns Tomb complex.

== Architecture ==
The mausoleum is built of plaster and rubble. At the time of construction, it was entirely covered with blue, green and whitef tiles. Turquoise blue was the dominant amongst the other colors. The building is square in plan and has chamfered angles. A hemispherical dome rests on a drum. There is no mihrab (a niche in a wall indicating the direction in which Muslims pray) inside the building. It also contains semi-octagonal angled alcoves.

Each side of the facade contains decorative arches marked with plaster. These arches were initially covered with glazed tiles. Currently, glazed tiles are extant on the northern side of facade. The interior of the building contains a square chamber which in turn has been artificially divided into two storeys. Stucco decorations are present on the medallions of the interior arches. The squinches have converted the second storey into an octagonal conformation. Piercing on each side of them provide ventilation. No monument have been built over the grave. There is also no tombstone. At the time of construction, the interior was covered with glazed tiles which have currently been destroyed.

The drum from which the dome rises is cylindrical externally and circular internally. Red stone bricks have been used in the construction of the drum. The sotiff of the dome contains an arabesque design made using blue and red coloured tiles. The brick built dome is complementary to its drum. The dome was covered with turquoise blue tiles. From these, the building gets its name Nila Gumbad which in English translates to "Blue Dome". A kalasa finial crowns the dome.
