= Tombs of Battashewala Complex =

Coordinates: 28°35′46″N 77°14′56″E

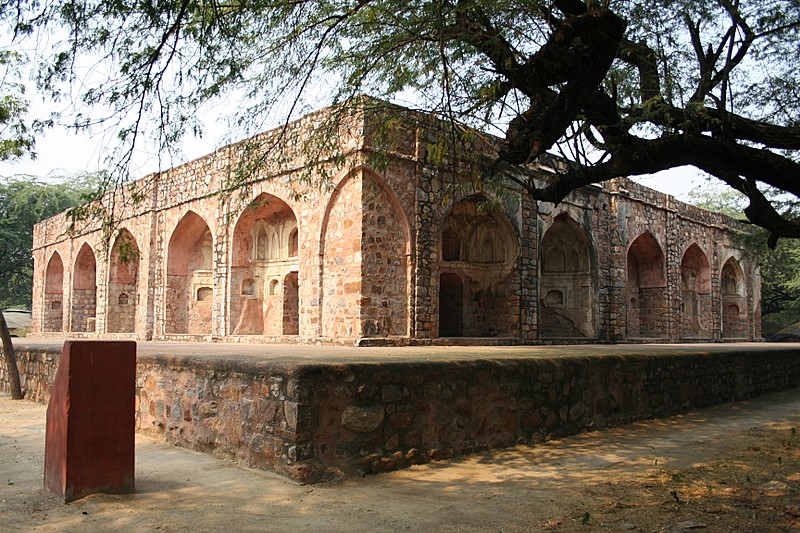
Bara Batasha before renovation

Tombs of Battashewala Complex is an Archaeological Survey of India (ASI) protected monument in Nizamuddin East, Delhi. The funerary complex, consists of three Mughal period tombs, known as the Bara Batashewala Mahal, the Chota Batashewala Mahal, an unidentified Mughal tomb and arched compound wall enclosures.

== Location ==
The complex is located in an 11 acres (4.5 ha) land within arcaded enclosures. It was an integral part of the 16th century necropolis of Delhi. Within its neighbourhood is the famous dargah (shrine) of Sufi saint Nizamuddin Auliya who lived during the 14th century. The tomb complex is located next to the Humayun Tomb's enclosure. Access to the tomb is also from the north gate of Humayun's Tomb and also from the Sunder Nursery.

== Features ==
The Tombs of Batashewala Complex lie in the buffer zone of the World Heritage Site of the Humayun Tomb Complex; the two complexes are separated by a small road but enclosed within their own separate compound walls. The complex has three tombs which are identified as Bara Batashewala Mahal and the Chota Batashewala Mahal, enclosed within a compound wall with arches of 1,000 feet (300 m) length built with stone masonry; and a Mughal tomb of an unidentified person, to the east of the other two tombs, in a separate enclosure. All three tombs are reported to have been built during the late 16th – early 17th century. It is said that such a funerary complex does not exist anywhere else in India.

=== Bara Batashewala Mahal ===
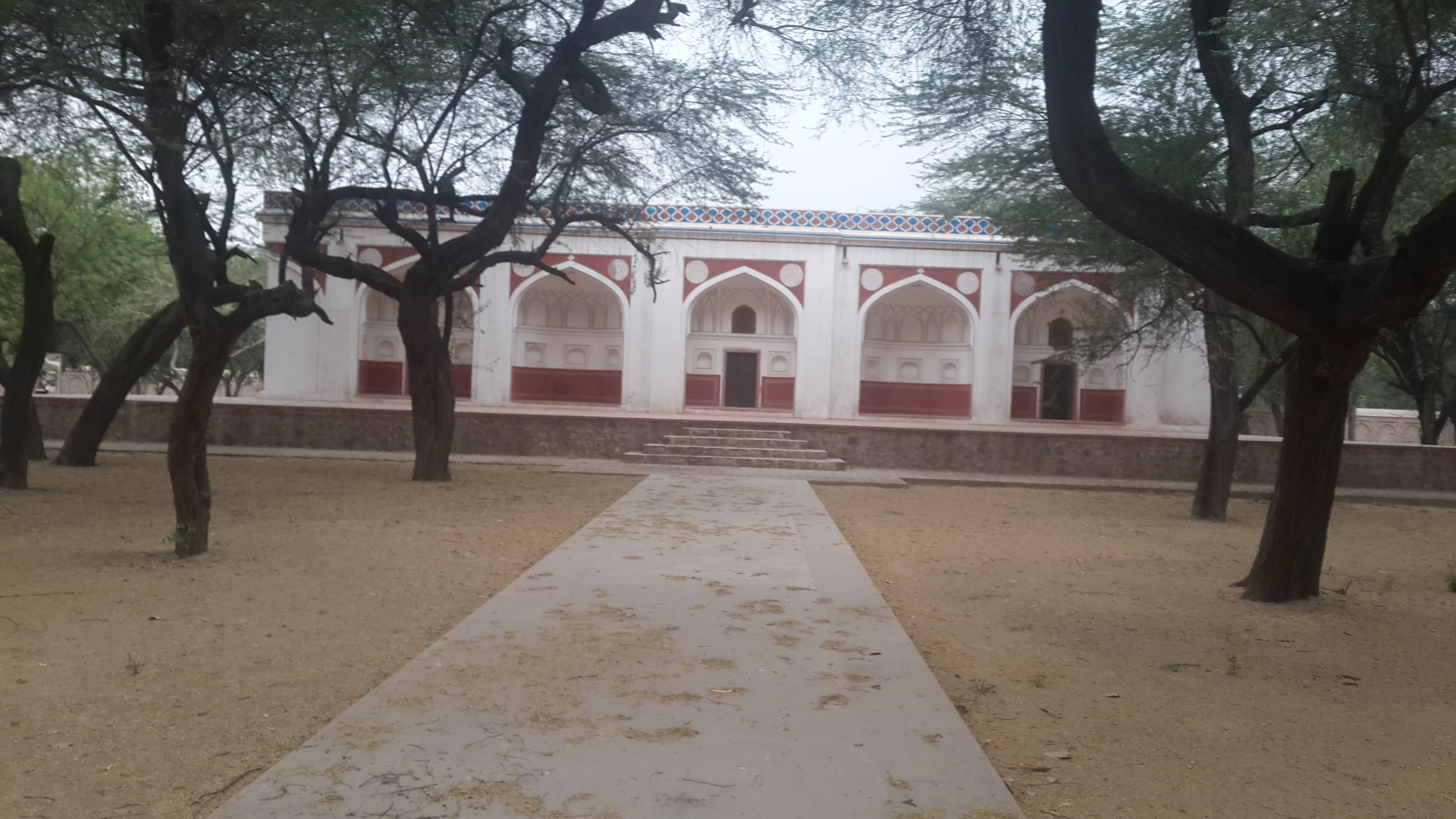
Refurbished Bara Battashewala Tomb

The tomb, known as the Bara Batashewala Mahal, is a funerary structure where Mirza Muzaffar Husain, son-in-law of Akbar and the great-nephew of Humayun, is kept. It was built during 1603–4. Built in Mughal architectural style, it has a flat roof, which in the past, is stated to have been covered by a "textile canopy". A single storied square structure of 30 feet (9.1 m) square, its architecture is similar to the Jal Mahal and Humayun tomb. It has a central chamber consisting of eight small rooms, and it is said to be a replica of an Iranian design. The interiors around the sarcophagus (crypt) is richly decorated with incised plaster and tiles. All four identical facades of the square tomb have five half-domed entrances, also decorated on plaster and tiles. In the past, the west facing facade had collapsed and the southern facade had been repaired poorly during the 20th century. However, during 2012–15, this tomb, including the entire complex, has been renovated.

=== Chota Batashewala Mahal ===
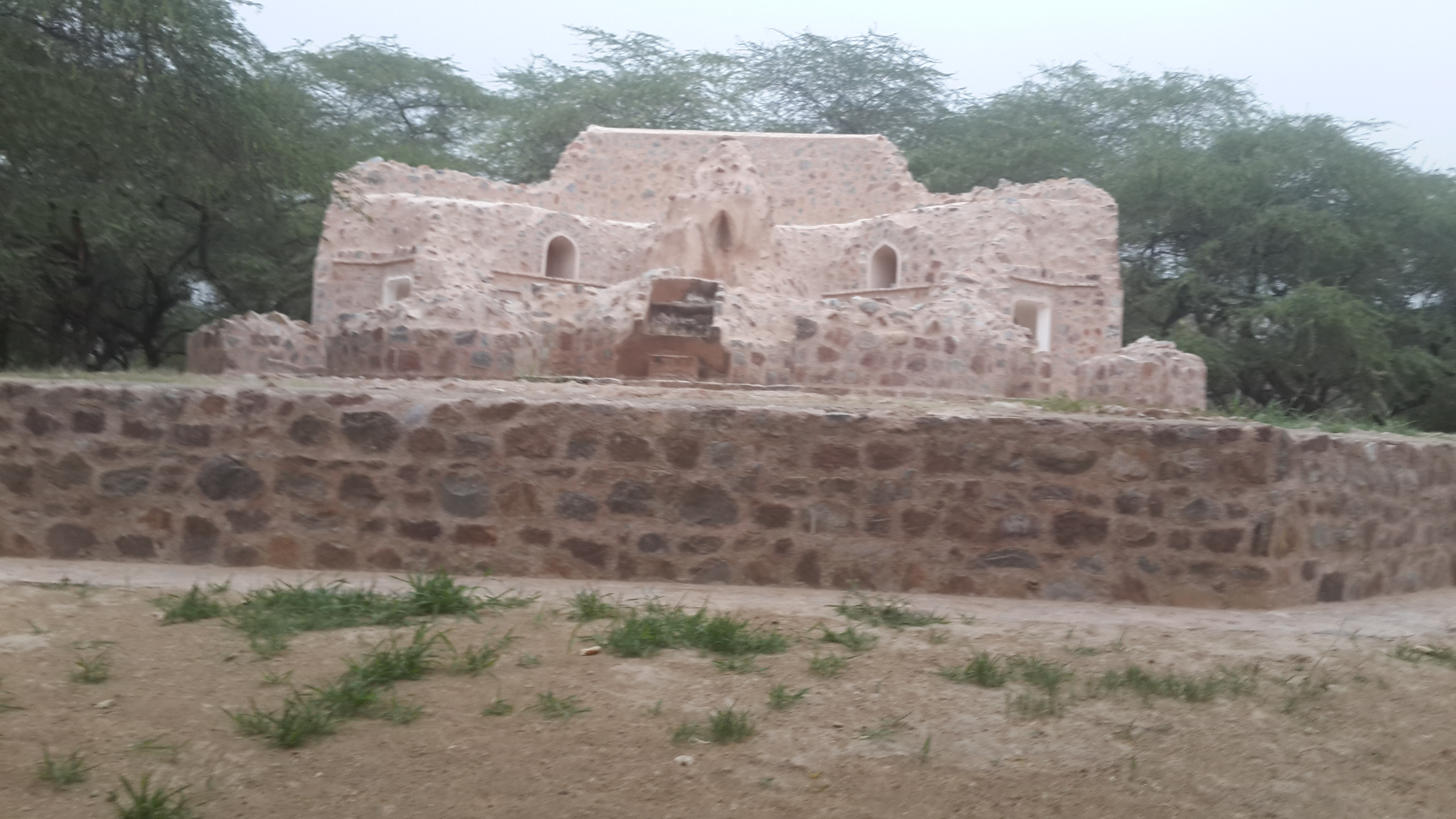
Ruins of Chota Batteshawla tomb

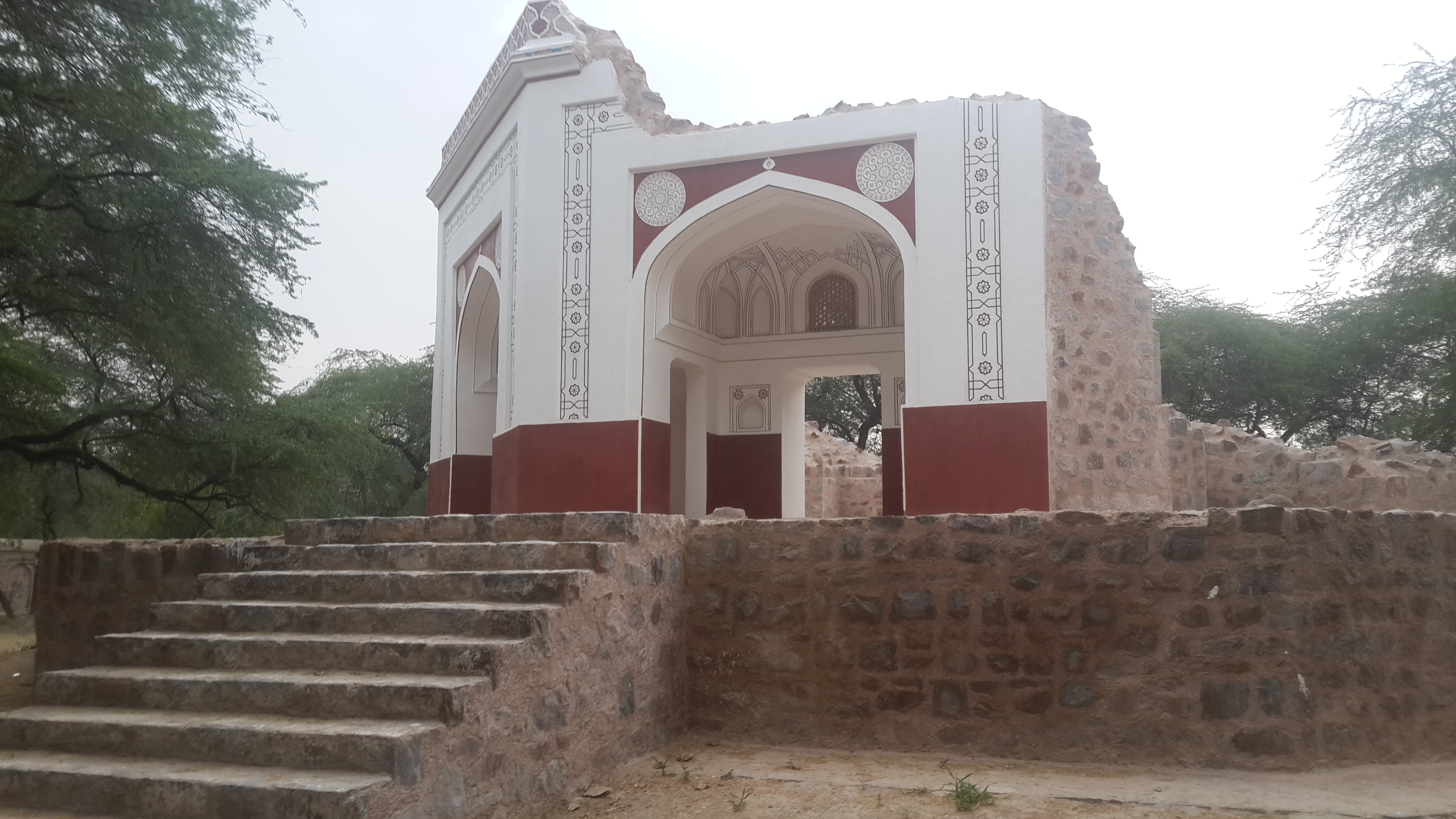
Renovated Chota Battashewala Tomb

As originally built, the tomb was in the form of an octagonal dome, extensively decorated. During the later part of the 20th century it had substantially deteriorated. The tomb has been partially restored now on the basis of the pictures of the structure as it existed during the 1960s, old drawings and from an examination of the features of the existing parts.

=== Mughal tomb ===
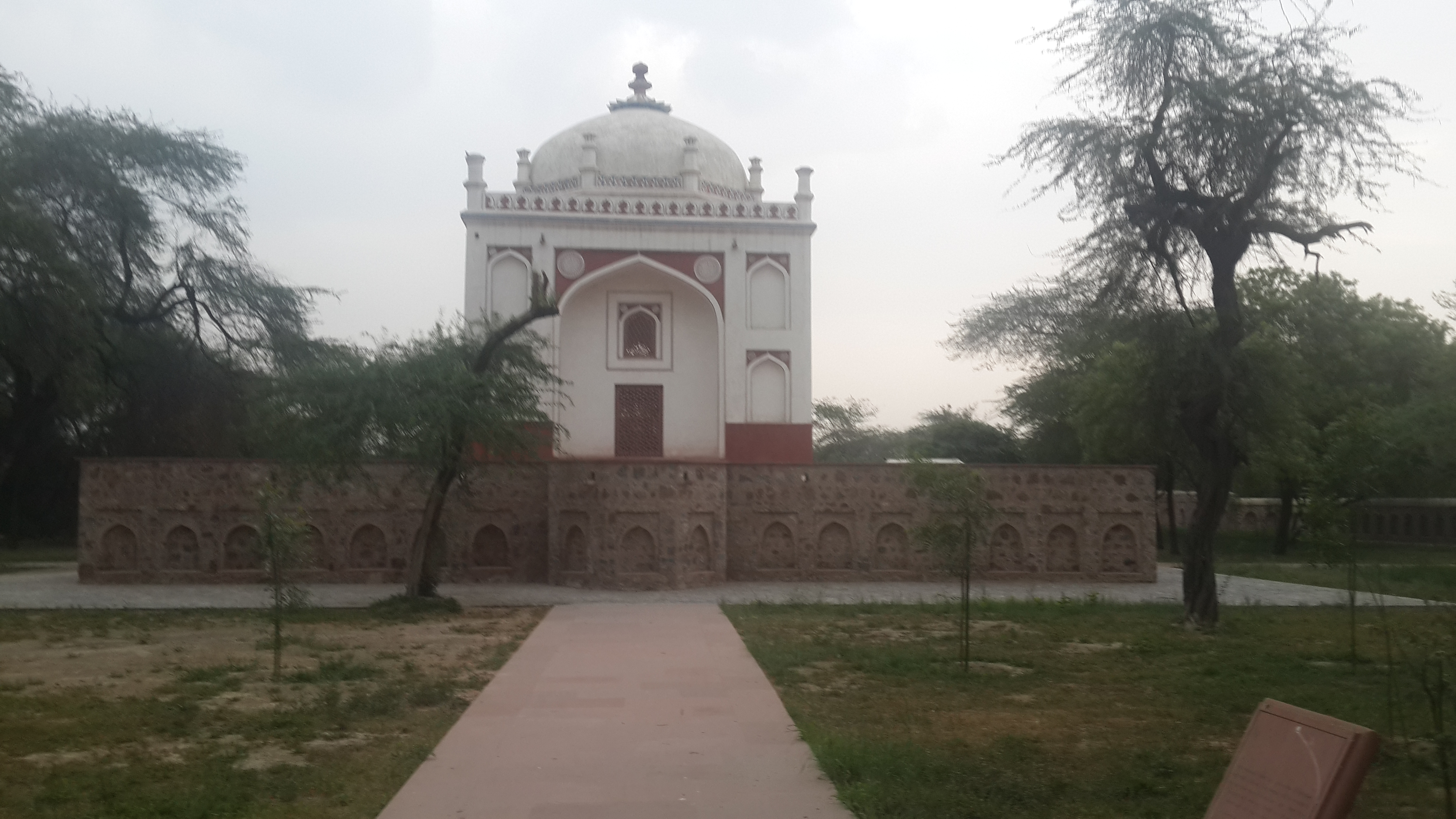
Unnamed Mughal tomb after renovation

This tomb is a tall structure and is located in the eastern part of the Battashewala Complex. It is built with stone masonry over a raised fort-type platform. It measures 100 metres (330 ft) in length and 60 metres (200 ft) in width. It is a domed structure with rich decorations. As part of the structure had collapsed, restoration works were undertaken in a planned manner.

== Conservation measures ==
On account of the site's occupation, on a perpetual lease basis, by the Delhi State Bharat Scouts and Guides since 1941 as a camping ground, the tomb structures in the complex suffered serious deterioration; the tombs were also ignored for several decades. However, after considerable efforts the ownership of the site was transferred to the Archaeological Survey of India in 2010 to undertake conservation works of the tombs. Soon after, in 2011, conservation efforts were initiated by the Aga Khan Trust for Culture (AKTC). A multi-disciplinary team of AKTC carried out the restoration works over a period of four years. The team adopted "traditional construction material and building techniques". The cement based repairs carried out in earlier times were all replaced.

The complex of tombs have been refurbished at a cost of US$750,000, the first of its kind funded under the US Ambassadors Fund for Cultural Preservation Projects (AFCP). The initiative to restore this complex was taken after the visit of President Obama to the Humayun Tomb Complex in 2010. The restoration works have been carried out by the AFCP in association with the Archaeological Survey of India. The restored structures were formally opened to the public on 18 April 2015, which was also observed as the UNESCO declared World Heritage Day. The Ministry of Culture, Government of India, has now plans to pose this tomb complex for inclusion as part of the UNESCO heritage complex of the Humayun Tomb.

== Bibliography ==
- Asher, Catherine Blanshard (24 September 1992). Architecture of Mughal India. Cambridge University Press. ISBN 978-0-521-26728-1.
- Luke, Christina; Kersel, Morag (4 January 2013). US Cultural Diplomacy and Archaeology: Soft Power, Hard Heritage. Routledge. ISBN 978-1-136-15570-3.
